= Fission products (by element) =

Breakdown of nuclear fission results

Fission product yields by mass for thermal neutron fission of U-235 and Pu-239 (the two typical of current nuclear power reactors) and U-233 (used in the thorium cycle)

This page discusses each of the main elements in the mixture of fission products produced by nuclear fission of the common nuclear fuels uranium and plutonium. The isotopes are listed by element, in order by atomic number.

Neutron capture by the nuclear fuel in nuclear reactors and atomic bombs also produces actinides and transuranium elements (not listed here). These are found mixed with fission products in spent nuclear fuel and nuclear fallout.

Neutron capture by materials of the nuclear reactor (shielding, cladding, etc.) or the environment (seawater, soil, etc.) produces activation products (not listed here). These are found in used nuclear reactors and nuclear fallout. A small but non-negligible proportion of fission events produces not two, but three fission products (not counting neutrons or subatomic particles). This ternary fission usually produces a very light nucleus such as helium (about 80% of ternary fissions produce an alpha particle) or hydrogen (most of the rest produce tritium or to a lesser extent deuterium and protium) as the third product. This is the main source of tritium from light water reactors. Another source of tritium is Helium-6 which immediately decays to (stable) Lithium-6. Lithium-6 produces tritium when hit by neutrons and is one of the main sources of commercially or militarily produced tritium. If the first or only step of nuclear reprocessing is an aqueous solution (as is the case in PUREX) this poses a problem as tritium contamination cannot be removed from water other than by costly isotope separation. Furthermore, a tiny fraction of the free neutrons involved in the operation of a nuclear reactor decay to a proton and a beta particle before they can interact with anything else. Given that protons from this source are indistinguishable from protons from ternary fission or radiolysis of coolant water, their overall proportion is hard to quantify.

Half-lives (example: most stable isotopes)
^{210}At	< 1 day
^{222}Rn	1–10 days
^{258}Md	10–100 days
^{252}Es	100 days–10 a
^{226}Ra	10–10,000 a
^{97}Tc	10 ka–700 Ma
^{238}U	> 700 Ma
^{12}C	Stable

== Germanium-72, 73, 74, 76 ==
^{72}Ge	^{73}Ge	^{74}Ge	^{76}Ge

If germanium-75 is produced, it quickly decays to arsenic. Germanium-76 is essentially stable, only decaying via extremely slow double beta decay to ^{76}Se.

== Arsenic-75 ==
^{75}As

While arsenic presents no radiological hazard, it is extremely chemically toxic. If it is desired to get rid of arsenic (no matter its origin), thermal neutron irradiation of the only stable isotope ^{75}As will yield short lived ^{76}As which quickly decays to stable ^{76}Se. If arsenic is irradiated with sufficient fast neutrons to cause notable "knockout" (n,2n) or even (n,3n) reactions, Isotopes of germanium will be produced instead.

== Selenium-77, 78, 79, 80, 82 ==
^{77}Se	^{78}Se	^{79}Se	^{80}Se	^{82}Se

Se-79, half-life of 327k years, is one of the long-lived fission products. Given the stability of its next lighter and heavier isotopes and the high cross section those isotopes exhibit for various neutron reactions, it is likely that the relatively low yield is due to Se-79 being destroyed in the reactor to an appreciable extent.

== Bromine-81 ==
^{81}Br

The other stable isotope ^{79}Br is "shadowed" by the long half-life of its more neutron rich isobar ^{79}Se.

== Krypton-83, 84, 85, 86 ==
^{83}Kr	^{84}Kr	^{85}Kr	^{86}Kr

Krypton-85, with a half-life 10.76 years, is formed by the fission process with a fission yield of about 0.3%. Only 20% of the fission products of mass 85 become ^{85}Kr itself; the rest passes through a short-lived nuclear isomer and then to stable ^{85}Rb. If irradiated reactor fuel is reprocessed, this radioactive krypton may be released into the air. This krypton release can be detected and used as a means of detecting clandestine nuclear reprocessing. Strictly speaking, the stage which is detected is the dissolution of used nuclear fuel in nitric acid, as it is at this stage that the krypton and other fission gases like the more abundant xenon are released. Despite the industrial applications of krypton-85 and the relatively high prices of both krypton and xenon, they are not currently extracted from spent fuel to any appreciable extent even though krypton and xenon both become solid at the temperature of liquid nitrogen and could thus be captured in a cold trap if the flue gas of a voloxidation process were cooled by liquid nitrogen.

Increase of fission gases above a certain limit can lead to fuel pin swelling and even puncture, so that fission gas measurement after discharging the fuel from the reactor is most important to make burn-up calculations, to study the nature of fuel inside the reactor, behaviour with pin materials, for effective utilization of fuel and also reactor safety. In addition to that, they are a nuisance in a nuclear reactor due to being neutron poisons, albeit not to the same extent as isotopes of xenon, another noble gas produced by fission.

== Rubidium-85, 87 ==
^{85}Rb	^{87}Rb

Rubidium-87 has such a long half-life as to be essentially stable (longer than the age of the Earth). Rubidium-86 quickly decays to stable strontium-86 if produced either directly via (n,2n) reactions in rubidium-87, or via neutron capture in rubidium-85.

== Strontium-88, 89, 90 ==
Medium-lived fission products
Nuclide	t_{1/2}	Yield	Q (Note: Decay energy is split among β, neutrino, and γ if any.)	βγ
	(a)	(%) (Note: Per 65 thermal neutron fissions of ^{235}U and 35 of ^{239}Pu.)	(keV)	
^{155}Eu	4.74	0.0803 (Note: Neutron poison; in thermal reactors, most is destroyed by further neutron capture.)	252	βγ
^{85}Kr	10.73	0.2180 (Note: Less than 1/4 of mass-85 fission products as most bypass ground state: ^{85}Br → ^{85m}Kr → ^{85}Rb.)	687	βγ
^{113m}Cd	13.9	0.0008	316	β
^{90}Sr	28.91	4.505	2826 (Note: Has decay energy 546 keV; its decay product ^{90}Y has decay energy 2.28 MeV with weak gamma branching.)	β
^{137}Cs	30.04	6.337	1176	βγ
^{121m}Sn	43.9	0.00005	390	βγ
^{151}Sm	94.6	0.5314	77	β

^{88}Sr	^{89}Sr	^{90}Sr

The strontium radioisotopes are very important, as strontium is a calcium mimic which is incorporated in bone growth and therefore has a great ability to harm humans. On the other hand, this also allows ^{89}Sr to be used in the open source radiotherapy of bone tumors. This tends to be used in palliative care to reduce the pain due to secondary tumors in the bones.

Strontium-90 is a strong beta emitter with a half-life of 28.8 years. Its fission product yield decreases as the mass of the fissile nuclide increases - fission of ^{233}U produces more ^{90}Sr than fission of ^{239}Pu with fission of ^{235}U in the middle. A map of ^{90}Sr contamination around Chernobyl has been published by the IAEA. Due to its very small neutron absorption cross section, strontium-90 is poorly suited for thermal neutron induced nuclear transmutation as a way of disposing of it.

Strontium-90 has been used in radioisotope thermoelectric generators (RTGs) in the past because of its relatively high power density (0.95 W_{thermal}/g for the metal, 0.46 W_{thermal}/g for the commonly used inert perovskite form strontium titanate) and because it is easily extracted from spent fuel (both native strontium metal and strontium oxide react with water by forming soluble strontium hydroxide). However, the increased availability of renewable energy for off-grid applications formerly served by RTGs as well as concern about orphan sources has led to a nigh-total abandonment of ^{90}Sr in RTGs. The few (largely space based) applications for RTGs that still exist are largely supplied by ^{238}Pu despite its higher cost, as it has a higher power density, longer half-life and is easier shielded since it is an alpha emitter while strontium-90 is a beta emitter.

== Yttrium-89 to 91 ==
^{89}Y	^{90}Y	^{91}Y

The only stable yttrium isotope, ^{89}Y, will be found with yield somewhat less than 1% in a fission product mixture which has been allowed to age for months or years, as the next-longest lived yttrium isotopes have half-lives of only 107 days (^{88}Y) or 59 days (^{91}Y). However, a small amount of yttrium-90 will be found in secular equilibrium with its parent strontium-90 unless the two elements are separated from each other.

^{90}Sr decays into ^{90}Y which is a beta emitter with a half-life of 2.67 days. ^{90}Y is sometimes used for medical purposes and can be obtained either by the neutron activation of stable ^{89}Y or by using a device similar to a technetium cow.

As the half-lives of the unstable yttrium isotopes are low (^{88}Y being the longest at 106 days), yttrium extracted from strontium-free moderately aged spent fuel has negligible radioactivity. However, the strong gamma emitter ^{90}Y will be present as long as its parent nuclide ^{90}Sr is. Should a nonradioactive sample of yttrium be desired, care must be taken to remove all traces of strontium and sufficient time to let the short lived Y-90 (64 hours half-life) decay must be allowed before the product can be used.

== Zirconium-90 to 96 ==
^{90}Zr	^{91}Zr	^{92}Zr	^{93}Zr	^{94}Zr	^{95}Zr	^{96}Zr

A significant amount of zirconium is formed by the fission process; some of this consists of short-lived radionuclides (^{95}Zr and ^{97}Zr which decay to molybdenum), while almost 10% of the fission products mixture after years of decay consists of five stable or nearly stable isotopes of zirconium plus ^{93}Zr with a halflife of 1.53 million years which is one of the 7 major long-lived fission products. Zirconium is commonly used in cladding of fuel rods due to its low neutron cross section. However, a small share of this zirconium does capture neutrons and contributes to the overall inventory of radioactive zirconium isotopes. Zircalloy cladding is not commonly reused and neither is fission product zirconium, which could be used in cladding as its relatively weak radioactivity would be of no major concern inside a nuclear reactor. Despite its high yield and long live, Zr-93 is generally not deemed to be of major concern as it is not chemically mobile and emits little radiation.

In PUREX plants the zirconium (regardless of source or isotope) sometimes forms a third phase which can be a disturbance in the plant. The third phase is the term in solvent extraction given to a third layer (such as foam and/or emulsion) which forms from the two layers in the solvent extraction process. The zirconium forms the third phase by forming small particles which stabilise the emulsion which is the third phase.

Zirconium-90 mostly forms by successive beta decays out of strontium-90. A nonradioactive zirconium sample can be extracted from spent fuel by extracting strontium-90 and allowing enough of it to decay (e.g. in an RTG). The zirconium can then be separated from the remaining strontium leaving a very isotopically pure Zr-90 sample.

== Niobium-95 ==
^{95}Nb

Niobium-95, with a half-life of 35 days, is initially present as a fission product. The only stable isotope of niobium has mass number 93, and fission products of mass 93 first decay to long-lived zirconium-93 (half-life 1.53 Ma). Niobium-95 will decay to molybdenum-95 which is stable.

== Molybdenum-95, 97, 98, 99, 100 ==
^{95}Mo	^{97}Mo	^{98}Mo	^{99}Mo	^{100}Mo

The fission product mixture contains significant amounts of molybdenum. Molybdenum-99 is of enormous interest to nuclear medicine as the parent nuclide to ^{99m}Tc, but its short half-life means it will usually decay long before the spent fuel is reprocessed. ^{99}Mo can be produced both by fission followed by immediate reprocessing (usually only done in small-scale research reactors) or in particle accelerators. As molybdenum-100 only decays extremely slowly via double beta decay (half-life longer than the age of the universe), the molybdenum content of spent fuel will be essentially stable after a few days have passed to allow the molybdenum-99 to decay.

== Technetium-99 ==
Long-lived fission products
Nuclide	t_{1/2}	Yield	Q (Note: Decay energy is split among β, neutrino, and γ if any.)	βγ
	(Ma)	(%) (Note: Per 65 thermal neutron fissions of ^{235}U and 35 of ^{239}Pu.)	(keV)	
^{99}Tc	0.211	6.1385	294	β
^{126}Sn	0.23	0.1084	4050 (Note: Has decay energy 380 keV, but its decay product ^{126}Sb has decay energy 3.67 MeV.)	βγ
^{79}Se	0.33	0.0447	151	β
^{135}Cs	1.33	6.9110 (Note: Lower in thermal reactors because ^{135}Xe, its predecessor, readily absorbs neutrons.)	269	β
^{93}Zr	1.61	5.4575	91	βγ
^{107}Pd	6.5	1.2499	33	β
^{129}I	16.1	0.8410	194	βγ

^{99}Tc

^{99}Tc, half-life 211 ka, is produced at a yield of about 6% per fission; see also the main fission products page. It is also produced (via the short-lived nuclear isomer technetium-99m) as a decay product of molybdenum-99. Technetium is particularly mobile in the environment as it forms negatively charged pertechnetate-ions (TcO^{−}_{4}, resembling the permanganate anion), and it presents the biggest radiological hazard among the long-lived fission products. Despite being a metal, technetium usually does not form positively charged ions, but technetium halides like technetium hexafluoride exist. TcF_{6} is a nuisance in uranium enrichment as its boiling point (328.4 K (55.3 °C; 131.4 °F)) is very close to that of uranium hexafluoride (329.6 K (56.5 °C; 133.6 °F)). The issue is known to enrichment facilities because spontaneous fission also yields small amounts of technetium (which will be in secular equilibrium with its parent nuclides in natural uranium) but if fluoride volatility is employed for reprocessing, a significant share of the "uranium" separated by fractional distillation will be contaminated with technetium requiring a further purification step.

Technetium-99 is suitable for nuclear transmutation by slow neutrons as it has a sufficient thermal neutron cross section and as it has no known stable isotopes. Under neutron irradiation, Tc-99 forms Tc-100 which quickly decays to stable ^{100}Ru a valuable platinum group metal.

== Ruthenium-101 to 106 ==
^{101}Ru	^{102}Ru	^{103}Ru	^{104}Ru	^{105}Ru	^{106}Ru

Plenty of radioactive ruthenium-103, ruthenium-106, and stable ruthenium are formed by the fission process. The ruthenium in PUREX raffinate can become oxidized to form volatile ruthenium tetroxide which forms a purple vapour above the surface of the aqueous liquor. The ruthenium tetroxide is very similar to osmium tetroxide; the ruthenium compound is a stronger oxidant which enables it to form deposits by reacting with other substances. In this way the ruthenium in a reprocessing plant is very mobile, difficult to stabilize, and can be found in odd places. It has been called extremely troublesome and has a notorious reputation as an especially difficult product to handle during reprocessing. Voloxidation combined with cold trap collection of the flue gases could recover the volatile ruthenium tetroxide before it can become a nuisance in further processing. After the radioactive isotopes have had time to decay, recovered ruthenium could be sold at its relatively high market value.

In addition, the ruthenium in PUREX raffinate forms a large number of nitrosyl complexes which makes the chemistry of the ruthenium very complex. The ligand exchange rate at ruthenium and rhodium tends to be long, hence it can take a long time for a ruthenium or rhodium compound to react.

At Chernobyl, during the fire, the ruthenium became volatile and behaved differently from many of the other metallic fission products. Some of the particles which were emitted by the fire were very rich in ruthenium.

As the longest-lived radioactive isotope ruthenium-106 has a half-life of only 373.59 days, it has been suggested that the ruthenium and palladium in PUREX raffinate should be used as a source of the metals after allowing the radioactive isotopes to decay. After ten half-life cycles have passed, over 99.9% of any radioisotope is stable. For Ru-106 this is 3,735.9 days or about 10 years.

== Rhodium-103, 105 ==
^{103}Rh	^{105}Rh

While less rhodium than ruthenium and palladium is formed (around 3.6% yield), the mixture of fission products still contains a significant amount of this metal. Due to the high prices of ruthenium, rhodium, and palladium, some work has been done on the separation of these metals to enable them to be used at a later date. Because of the possibility of the metals being contaminated by radioactive isotopes, they are not suitable for making consumer products such as jewellery. However, this source of the metals could be used for catalysts in industrial plants such as petrochemical plants.

A dire example of people being exposed to radiation from contaminated jewellery occurred in the United States. It is thought that gold seeds used to contain radon were recycled into jewellery. The gold indeed did contain radioactive decay products of ^{222}Rn.

Some other rhodium isotopes exist as "transitory states" of ruthenium, decaying before further decaying towards stable isotopes of palladium. If the low-level radioactivity of palladium (see below) is deemed excessive – for example, for use as an investment or jewellery – either of its predecessors can be extracted from relatively "young" spent fuel and allowed to decay before extracting the stable end-product of the decay series.

== Palladium-105 to 110 ==
^{105}Pd	^{106}Pd	^{107}Pd	^{108}Pd	^{109}Pd	^{110}Pd

Much palladium forms during the fission process. In nuclear reprocessing, not all of the fission palladium dissolves; also some palladium that dissolves at first comes out of solution later. Palladium-rich dissolver fines (particles) are often removed as they interfere with the solvent extraction process by stabilising the third phase.

The fission palladium can separate during the process in which the PUREX raffinate is combined with glass and heated to form the final high level waste form. The palladium forms an alloy with the fission tellurium. This alloy can separate from the glass.

^{107}Pd is the only long-living radioactive isotope among the fission products and its beta decay has a long half-life and low energy, this allows industrial use of extracted palladium without isotope separation.

Palladium-109 will most likely have decayed to stable silver-109 by the time reprocessing happens. Before reaching silver-109, a nuclear isomer will be reached; ^{109m}Ag. However, unlike for ^{99m}Tc there is no current use for ^{109m}Ag.

== Silver-109, 111 ==
^{109}Ag	^{111}Ag

While the radioactive silver isotopes that are produced quickly decay away leaving only stable silver, extracting it for use is not economical, unless as byproduct of platinum group metal extraction.

== Cadmium-111 to 116 ==
^{111}Cd	^{112}Cd	^{113}Cd	^{114}Cd	^{115}Cd	^{116}Cd

Cadmium is a strong neutron poison and in fact control rods are often made out of cadmium, making the accumulation of cadmium in fuel of particular concern for the maintenance of stable neutron economy. Cadmium is also a chemically poisonous heavy metal, but given the number of neutron absorptions required for transmutation, it is not a high priority target for deliberate transmutation.

== Indium-115 ==
^{115}In

While indium-115 is very slightly radioactive, its half-life is longer than the age of the universe and indeed a typical sample of indium on earth will contain more of this "unstable" isotope than of "stable" indium-113.

== Tin-117 to 126 ==
^{117}Sn	^{118}Sn	^{119}Sn	^{120}Sn	^{121}Sn	^{122}Sn	^{123}Sn	^{124}Sn	^{125}Sn	^{126}Sn

In a normal thermal reactor, tin-121m has a very low fission product yield; thus, this isotope is not a significant contributor to nuclear waste. Fast fission or fission of some heavier actinides will produce ^{121m}Sn at higher yields. For example, its yield from U-235 is 0.0007% per thermal fission and 0.002% per fast fission.

== Antimony-121, 123, 124, 125 ==
^{123}Sb	^{125}Sb

Antimony-125 decays with a half-life of over two years to ^{125m}Te which itself decays with a half-life of almost two months via isomeric transition to the ground state. While its relatively short half-life and the significant gamma emissions (144.77 keV) of its daughter nuclide make usage in an RTG less attractive, Sb-125 could deliver a relatively high power density of 3.4 W_{thermal}/g.

Fluoride volatility can recover antimony as the mildly volatile (solid at room temperature) antimony trifluoride or the more volatile (boiling point 422.6 K (149.5 °C; 301.0 °F)) antimony pentafluoride.

== Tellurium-125 to 132 ==
^{125}Te	^{126}Te	^{127}Te	^{128}Te	^{129}Te	^{130}Te	^{131}Te	^{132}Te

Tellurium-128 and -130 are essentially stable. They only decay by double beta decay, with half-lives >10^{20} years. They constitute the major fraction of natural occurring tellurium at 32 and 34% respectively. Tellurium-132 and its daughter ^{132}I are important in the first few days after a criticality. It was responsible for a large fraction of the dose inflicted on workers at Chernobyl in the first week.

The isobar forming ^{132}Te/^{132}I is: Tin-132 (half-life 40 s) decaying to antimony-132 (half-life 2.8 minutes) decaying to tellurium-132 (half-life 3.2 days) decaying to iodine-132 (half-life 2.3 hours) which decays to stable xenon-132.

The creation of tellurium-126 is delayed by the long half-life (230 k years) of tin-126.

== Iodine-127, 129, 131 ==
^{127}I	^{129}I	^{131}I

^{131}I, with a half-life of 8 days, is a hazard from nuclear fallout because iodine concentrates in the thyroid gland. See also Radiation effects from Fukushima Daiichi nuclear disaster#Iodine-131 and Downwinders#Nevada.

In common with ^{89}Sr, ^{131}I is used for the treatment of cancer. A small dose of ^{131}I can be used in a thyroid function test while a large dose can be used to destroy the thyroid cancer. This treatment will also normally seek out and destroy any secondary tumor which arose from a thyroid cancer. Much of the energy from the beta emission from the ^{131}I will be absorbed in the thyroid, while the gamma rays are likely to be able to escape from the thyroid to irradiate other parts of the body.

Large amounts of ^{131}I was released during an experiment named the Green Run in which fuel which had only been allowed to cool for a short time after irradiation was reprocessed in a plant which had no iodine scrubber in operation.

^{129}I, with a half-life almost a billion times as long, is a long-lived fission product. It is among the most troublesome because it accumulates in a relatively small organ (the thyroid) where even its comparatively low radiation dose can cause great damage as it has a long biological half-life. For this reason, iodine is often considered for transmutation despite the presence of stable ^{127}I in spent fuel. In the thermal neutron spectrum, more iodine-129 is destroyed than newly created since iodine-128 is short lived and the isotope ratio is in favor of ^{129}I. Depending on the design of the transmutation apparatus, care must be taken as xenon, the product of iodine's beta decay, is both a strong neutron poison and a gas that is nigh impossible to chemically "fix" in solid compounds, so it will either escape to the outside air or put pressure on the vessel containing the transmutation target.

^{127}I is stable, the only one of the isotopes of iodine that is nonradioactive. It makes up only about 1/6 of the iodine in spent fuel, with I-129 about 5/6.

== Xenon-131 to 136 ==
^{131}Xe	^{132}Xe	^{133}Xe	^{134}Xe	^{135}Xe	^{136}Xe

In reactor fuel, the fission product xenon, since it is almost insoluble in the lattice, tends to migrate to form bubbles in the fuel. As caesium 133, 135, and 137 are formed by the beta particle decay of the corresponding xenon isotopes, this causes the caesium to become physically separated from the bulk of the uranium oxide fuel.

Because ^{135}Xe is a potent nuclear poison with the largest cross section for thermal neutron absorption, the buildup of ^{135}Xe in the fuel inside a power reactor can lower the reactivity greatly. If a power reactor is shut down or left running at a low power level, then large amounts of ^{135}Xe can build up through decay of ^{135}I. When the reactor is restarted or the low power level is increased significantly, ^{135}Xe will be quickly consumed through neutron capture reactions and the reactivity of the core will increase. Under some circumstances, control systems may not be able to respond quickly enough to manage an abrupt reactivity increase as the built-up ^{135}Xe burns off. It is thought that xenon poisoning was one of the factors which led to the power surge which damaged the Chernobyl reactor core.

== Caesium-133, 134, 135, 137 ==
^{133}Cs	^{134}Cs	^{135}Cs	^{137}Cs

Caesium-134 is found in spent nuclear fuel but is not produced by nuclear weapon explosions, as it is only formed by neutron capture on stable Cs-133, which is only produced by beta decay of Xe-133 with a half-life of 3 days. Cs-134 has a half-life of 2 years and may be a major source of gamma radiation in the first 20 years after discharge.

Caesium-135 is a long-lived fission product with much weaker radioactivity. Neutron capture inside the reactor transmutes much of the xenon-135 that would otherwise decay to Cs-135.

Caesium-137, with a half-life of 30 years, is the main medium-lived fission product, along with Sr-90. Cs-137 is the primary source of penetrating gamma radiation from spent fuel from 10 years to about 300 years after discharge. It is the most significant radioisotope left in the area around Chernobyl.

== Barium-138, 139, 140 ==
^{138}Ba	^{139}Ba	^{140}Ba

Barium is formed in large amounts by the fission process. A short-lived barium isotope was confused with radium by some early workers. They were bombarding uranium with neutrons in an attempt to form a new element. But instead they caused fission which generated a large amount of radioactivity in the target. Because the chemistry of barium and radium the two elements could be coseparated by for instance a precipitation with sulfate anions. Because of this similarity of their chemistry the early workers thought that the very radioactive fraction which was separated into the "radium" fraction contained a new isotope of radium. Some of this early work was done by Otto Hahn and Fritz Strassmann.

== Lanthanides (lanthanum-139, cerium-140 to 144, neodymium-142 to 146, 148, 150, promethium-147, and samarium-149, 151, 152, 154) ==
A diagram showing the isotope signatures of natural neodymium (blue) and fission product neodymium from uranium-235 which had been subjected to thermal neutrons (red)

^{139}La	^{140}La
^{140}Ce	^{141}Ce	^{142}Ce	^{143}Ce	^{144}Ce
^{141}Pr	^{143}Pr
^{143}Nd	^{144}Nd	^{145}Nd	^{146}Nd	^{147}Nd	^{148}Nd	^{149}Nd	^{150}Nd
^{147}Pm	^{149}Pm	^{151}Pm
^{147}Sm	^{149}Sm	^{151}Sm	^{152}Sm	^{153}Sm	^{154}Sm
^{153}Eu	^{154}Eu	^{155}Eu	^{156}Eu
^{155}Gd	^{156}Gd	^{157}Gd	^{158}Gd	^{159}Gd	^{160}Gd
^{159}Tb	^{161}Tb
^{161}Dy

A great deal of the lighter lanthanides (lanthanum, cerium, neodymium, and samarium) are formed as fission products. In Africa, at Oklo where the natural nuclear fission reactor operated over a billion years ago, the isotopic mixture of neodymium is not the same as 'normal' neodymium; instead, it has an isotope pattern very similar to the neodymium formed by fission.

In the aftermath of criticality accidents, the level of ^{140}La is often used to determine the fission yield (in terms of the number of nuclei which underwent fission).

Samarium-149 is the second most important neutron poison in nuclear reactor physics. Samarium-151, produced at lower yields, is the third most abundant medium-lived fission product but emits only weak beta radiation. Both have high neutron absorption cross sections, so that much of them produced in a reactor are later destroyed there by neutron absorption.

Lanthanides are a problem in nuclear reprocessing because they are chemically very similar to actinides and most reprocessing aims at separating some or all of the actinides from the fission products or at least the neutron poisons among them.
