= Isotopes of xenon =

Isotopes of xenon (_{54}Xe)
Main isotopes			Decay	
Isotope	abundance	half-life (t_{1/2})	mode	product
^{124}Xe	0.095%	1.1×10^{22} y	εε	^{124}Te
^{125}Xe	synth	16.87 h	β^{+}	^{125}I
^{126}Xe	0.089%	stable		
^{127}Xe	synth	36.342 d	ε	^{127}I
^{128}Xe	1.91%	stable		
^{129}Xe	26.4%	stable		
^{130}Xe	4.07%	stable		
^{131}Xe	21.2%	stable		
^{132}Xe	26.9%	stable		
^{133}Xe	synth	5.2474 d	β^{−}	^{133}Cs
^{134}Xe	10.4%	stable		
^{135}Xe	synth	9.14 h	β^{−}	^{135}Cs
^{136}Xe	8.86%	2.18×10^{21} y	β^{−}β^{−}	^{136}Ba

Standard atomic weight A_{r}°(Xe)
- 131.293±0.006; 131.29±0.01 (abridged)

Naturally occurring xenon (_{54}Xe) consists of nine isotopes: seven stable isotopes and two very long-lived radioactive isotopes: double electron capture has been observed in ^{124}Xe (half-life 1.1 ± 0.2_{stat} ± 0.1_{sys}×10^{22} years), and double beta decay in ^{136}Xe (half-life 2.18 ×10^{21} years), which are among the longest measured half-lives of all nuclides. The isotopes ^{126}Xe and ^{134}Xe are also predicted to undergo double beta decay, but such decay processes have not been observed. Artificial unstable isotopes have been prepared from ^{108}Xe to ^{150}Xe, the longest-lived of which is ^{127}Xe with a half-life of 36.342 days. All other nuclides have half-lives less than 12 days, most less than one hour. The shortest-lived isotope, ^{108}Xe, has a half-life of 58 μs, and is the heaviest known nuclide with equal numbers of protons and neutrons. Of known isomers, the longest-lived is ^{131m}Xe with a half-life of 11.95 days, the second longest of all xenon's nuclides.

^{129}Xe is produced by beta decay of natural or artificial ^{129}I (half-life 16.1 million years); ^{131m}Xe, ^{133}Xe, ^{133m}Xe, and ^{135}Xe are some of the fission products of both ^{235}U and ^{239}Pu, so are used as indicators of nuclear explosions.

The artificial isotope ^{135}Xe is of considerable significance in the operation of nuclear fission reactors. ^{135}Xe has a huge cross section for thermal neutrons, 2.65 million barns, so it acts as a neutron absorber or "poison" that can slow or stop the chain reaction after a period of operation. This was discovered in the earliest nuclear reactors built by the American Manhattan Project for plutonium production. Because of this effect, designers must make provisions to increase the reactor's reactivity (the number of neutrons per fission that go on to fission other atoms of nuclear fuel) over the initial value needed to start the chain reaction. For the same reason, the xenon fission products produced in a nuclear explosion and a power plant differ significantly as a large share of ^{135}Xe will absorb neutrons in a steady state reactor, while in a bomb it can be assumed that none of the ^{135}I will have had time to decay to xenon before the explosion disperses it, removing it from the neutron radiation.

Relatively high concentrations of radioactive xenon isotopes are also found emanating from nuclear reactors due to the release of this fission gas from cracked fuel rods or fissioning of uranium in cooling water. The concentrations of these isotopes are still usually low compared to the naturally occurring radioactive noble gas ^{222}Rn.

Because xenon is a tracer for two parent isotopes, Xe isotope ratios in meteorites are a powerful tool for studying the formation of the Solar System. The I-Xe method of dating gives the time elapsed between nucleosynthesis and the condensation of a solid object from the solar nebula (xenon being a gas, only that part of it that formed after condensation will be present inside the object). Xenon isotopes are also a powerful tool for understanding terrestrial differentiation. Excess ^{129}Xe found in carbon dioxide well gases from New Mexico was believed to be from the decay of mantle-derived gases soon after Earth's formation. It has been suggested that the isotopic composition of atmospheric xenon fluctuated prior to the GOE before stabilizing, perhaps as a result of the rise in atmospheric O_{2}.

== List of isotopes ==
Nuclide (Note: ^{m}Xe – Excited nuclear isomer.)	Z	N	Isotopic mass (Da) (Note: ( ) – Uncertainty (1σ) is given in concise form in parentheses after the corresponding last digits.) (Note: # – Atomic mass marked #: value and uncertainty derived not from purely experimental data, but at least partly from trends from the Mass Surface (TMS).)	Discovery year	Half-life (Note: Bold half-life – nearly stable, half-life longer than age of universe.)	Decay mode (Note: Modes of decay: EC: / Electron capture; IT: / Isomeric transition; n: / Neutron emission)	Daughter isotope (Note: Bold symbol as daughter – Daughter product is stable.)	Spin and parity (Note: ( ) spin value – Indicates spin with weak assignment arguments.) (Note: # – Values marked # are not purely derived from experimental data, but at least partly from trends of neighboring nuclides (TNN).)	Natural abundance (mole fraction)	
Nuclide	Excitation energy			Discovery year	Half-life	Decay mode	Daughter isotope	Spin and parity	Normal proportion	Range of variation
^{108}Xe (Note: Heaviest known isotope with equal numbers of protons and neutrons)	54	54	107.95423(41)	2018	72(35) μs	α	^{104}Te	0+		
^{109}Xe	54	55	108.95076(32)#	2006	13(2) ms	α	^{105}Te	(7/2+)		
^{110}Xe	54	56	109.94426(11)	1981	93(3) ms	α (64%)	^{106}Te	0+		
^{110}Xe	54	56	109.94426(11)	1981	93(3) ms	β^{+} (36%)	^{110}I	0+		
^{111}Xe	54	57	110.941460(64)	1979	740(200) ms	β^{+} (89.6%)	^{111}I	5/2+#		
^{111}Xe	54	57	110.941460(64)	1979	740(200) ms	α (10.4%)	^{107}Te	5/2+#		
^{112}Xe	54	58	111.9355591(89)	1978	2.7(8) s	β^{+} (98.8%)	^{112}I	0+		
^{112}Xe	54	58	111.9355591(89)	1978	2.7(8) s	α (1.2%)	^{108}Te	0+		
^{113}Xe	54	59	112.9332217(73)	1973	2.74(8) s	β^{+} (92.98%)	^{113}I	5/2+#		
^{113}Xe	54	59	112.9332217(73)	1973	2.74(8) s	β^{+}, p (7%)	^{112}Te	5/2+#		
^{113}Xe	54	59	112.9332217(73)	1973	2.74(8) s	α (?%)	^{109}Te	5/2+#		
^{113}Xe	54	59	112.9332217(73)	1973	2.74(8) s	β^{+}, α (~0.007%)	^{109}Sb	5/2+#		
^{113m}Xe	403.6(14) keV			2013	6.9(3) μs	IT	^{113}Xe	(11/2−)		
^{114}Xe	54	60	113.927980(12)	1977	10.0(4) s	β^{+}	^{114}I	0+		
^{115}Xe	54	61	114.926294(13)	1969	18(3) s	β^{+} (99.66%)	^{115}I	(5/2+)		
^{115}Xe	54	61	114.926294(13)	1969	18(3) s	β^{+}, p (0.34%)	^{114}Te	(5/2+)		
^{116}Xe	54	62	115.921581(14)	1969	59(2) s	β^{+}	^{116}I	0+		
^{117}Xe	54	63	116.920359(11)	1969	61(2) s	β^{+}	^{117}I	5/2+		
^{117}Xe	54	63	116.920359(11)	1969	61(2) s	β^{+}, p (0.0029%)	^{116}Te	5/2+		
^{118}Xe	54	64	117.916179(11)	1965	3.8(9) min	β^{+}	^{118}I	0+		
^{119}Xe	54	65	118.915411(11)	1965	5.8(3) min	β^{+} (79%)	^{119}I	5/2+		
^{119}Xe	54	65	118.915411(11)	1965	5.8(3) min	EC (21%)	^{119}I	5/2+		
^{120}Xe	54	66	119.911784(13)	1965	46.0(6) min	β^{+}	^{120}I	0+		
^{121}Xe	54	67	120.911453(11)	1952	40.1(20) min	β^{+}	^{121}I	5/2+		
^{122}Xe	54	68	121.908368(12)	1952	20.1(1) h	EC	^{122}I	0+		
^{123}Xe	54	69	122.908482(10)	1952	2.08(2) h	β^{+}	^{123}I	1/2+		
^{123m}Xe	185.18(11) keV			1970	5.49(26) μs	IT	^{123}Xe	7/2−		
^{124}Xe (Note: Primordial radionuclide)	54	70	123.9058852(15)	1922	1.1(2)×10^{22} y	Double EC	^{124}Te	0+	9.5(5)×10^{−4}	
^{125}Xe	54	71	124.9063876(15)	1950	16.87(8) h	EC / β^{+}	^{125}I	1/2+		
^{125m1}Xe	252.61(14) keV			1954	56.9(9) s	IT	^{125}Xe	9/2−		
^{125m2}Xe	295.89(15) keV			1979	0.14(3) μs	IT	^{125}Xe	7/2+		
^{126}Xe	54	72	125.904297422(6)	1922	Observationally Stable (Note: Theoretically capable of 2EC decay to ^{126}Te)			0+	8.9(3)×10^{−4}	
^{127}Xe	54	73	126.9051836(44)	1950	36.342(3) d	EC	^{127}I	1/2+		
^{127m}Xe	297.10(8) keV			1954	69.2(9) s	IT	^{127}Xe	9/2−		
^{128}Xe	54	74	127.9035307534(56)	1922	Stable			0+	0.01910(13)	
^{128m}Xe	2787.2(3) keV			(1984) (Note: Half-life shorter than 100ns, not included in discovery database)	83(2) ns	IT	^{128}Xe	8−		
^{129}Xe (Note: Used in a method of radiodating groundwater and to infer certain events in the Solar System's history)	54	75	128.9047808574(54)	1920	Stable			1/2+	0.26401(138)	
^{129m}Xe	236.14(3) keV			1951	8.88(2) d	IT	^{129}Xe	11/2−		
^{130}Xe	54	76	129.903509346(10)	1922	Stable			0+	0.04071(22)	
^{131}Xe (Note: Fission product)	54	77	130.9050841281(55)	1920	Stable			3/2+	0.21232(51)	
^{131m}Xe	163.930(8) keV			1949	11.948(12) d	IT	^{131}Xe	11/2−		
^{132}Xe	54	78	131.9041550835(54)	1920	Stable			0+	0.26909(55)	
^{132m}Xe	2752.21(17) keV			1965	8.39(11) ms	IT	^{132}Xe	(10+)		
^{133}Xe (Note: Has medical uses)	54	79	132.9059107(26)	1940	5.2474(5) d	β^{−}	^{133}Cs	3/2+		
^{133m1}Xe	233.221(15) keV			1950	2.198(13) d	IT	^{133}Xe	11/2−		
^{133m2}Xe	2147(20)# keV			2017	8.64(13) ms	IT	^{133}Xe	(23/2+)		
^{134}Xe	54	80	133.905393030(6)	1920	Observationally Stable (Note: Theoretically capable of β^{−}β^{−} decay to ^{134}Ba with a half-life over 2.8×10^{22} years)			0+	0.10436(35)	
^{134m1}Xe	1965.5(5) keV			(1968) (Note: Only published in a conference proceeding and not a refereed journal.)	290(17) ms	IT	^{134}Xe	7−		
^{134m2}Xe	3025.2(15) keV			2001	5(1) μs	IT	^{134}Xe	(10+)		
^{135}Xe (Note: Most powerful known neutron absorber, produced in nuclear power plants as a decay product of ^{135}I, itself a decay product of ^{135}Te, a fission product. Normally absorbs neutrons in the high neutron flux environments to become ^{136}Xe; see iodine pit for more information)	54	81	134.9072314(39)	1940	9.14(2) h	β^{−}	^{135}Cs	3/2+		
^{135m}Xe	526.551(13) keV			1943	15.29(5) min	IT (99.70%)	^{135}Xe	11/2−		
^{135m}Xe	526.551(13) keV			1943	15.29(5) min	β^{−} (0.30%)	^{135}Cs	11/2−		
^{136}Xe	54	82	135.907214474(7)	1920	2.18(5)×10^{21} y	β^{−}β^{−}	^{136}Ba	0+	0.08857(72)	
^{136m}Xe	1891.74(7) keV			1970	2.92(3) μs	IT	^{136}Xe	6+		
^{137}Xe	54	83	136.91155777(11)	1943	3.818(13) min	β^{−}	^{137}Cs	7/2−		
^{138}Xe	54	84	137.9141463(30)	1943	14.14(7) min	β^{−}	^{138}Cs	0+		
^{139}Xe	54	85	138.9187922(23)	1951	39.68(14) s	β^{−}	^{139}Cs	3/2−		
^{140}Xe	54	86	139.9216458(25)	1951	13.60(10) s	β^{−}	^{140}Cs	0+		
^{141}Xe	54	87	140.9267872(31)	1951	1.73(1) s	β^{−} (99.96%)	^{141}Cs	5/2−		
^{141}Xe	54	87	140.9267872(31)	1951	1.73(1) s	β^{−}, n (0.044%)	^{140}Cs	5/2−		
^{142}Xe	54	88	141.9299731(29)	1960	1.23(2) s	β^{−} (99.63%)	^{142}Cs	0+		
^{142}Xe	54	88	141.9299731(29)	1960	1.23(2) s	β^{−}, n (0.37%)	^{141}Cs	0+		
^{143}Xe	54	89	142.9353696(50)	1951	511(6) ms	β^{−} (99.00%)	^{143}Cs	5/2−		
^{143}Xe	54	89	142.9353696(50)	1951	511(6) ms	β^{−}, n (1.00%)	^{142}Cs	5/2−		
^{144}Xe	54	90	143.9389451(57)	1989	0.388(7) s	β^{−} (97.0%)	^{144}Cs	0+		
^{144}Xe	54	90	143.9389451(57)	1989	0.388(7) s	β^{−}, n (3.0%)	^{143}Cs	0+		
^{145}Xe	54	91	144.944720(12)	2003	188(4) ms	β^{−} (95.0%)	^{145}Cs	3/2−#		
^{145}Xe	54	91	144.944720(12)	2003	188(4) ms	β^{−}, n (5.0%)	^{144}Cs	3/2−#		
^{146}Xe	54	92	145.948518(26)	1989	146(6) ms	β^{−}	^{146}Cs	0+		
^{146}Xe	54	92	145.948518(26)	1989	146(6) ms	β^{−}, n (6.9%)	^{145}Cs	0+		
^{147}Xe	54	93	146.95448(22)#	1994	88(14) ms	β^{−} (>92%)	^{147}Cs	3/2−#		
^{147}Xe	54	93	146.95448(22)#	1994	88(14) ms	β^{−}, n (<8%)	^{146}Cs	3/2−#		
^{148}Xe	54	94	147.95851(32)#	2010	85(15) ms	β^{−}	^{148}Cs	0+		
^{149}Xe	54	95	148.96457(32)#	2018	50# ms [>550 ms]			3/2−#		
^{150}Xe	54	96	149.96888(32)#	2018	40# ms [>550 ns]			0+		
This table header & footer:

== Xenon-124 ==
Xenon-124 is an isotope of xenon that undergoes double electron capture to tellurium-124 with a very long half-life of 1.1×10^{22} years, approximately 12 orders of magnitude longer than the age of the universe. This decay was observed in the XENON1T detector in 2019, and is the slowest one ever directly observed. (Even slower decays of other nuclei have been measured, but by detecting decay products that have accumulated over billions of years rather than observing them directly.)

== Xenon-129 ==
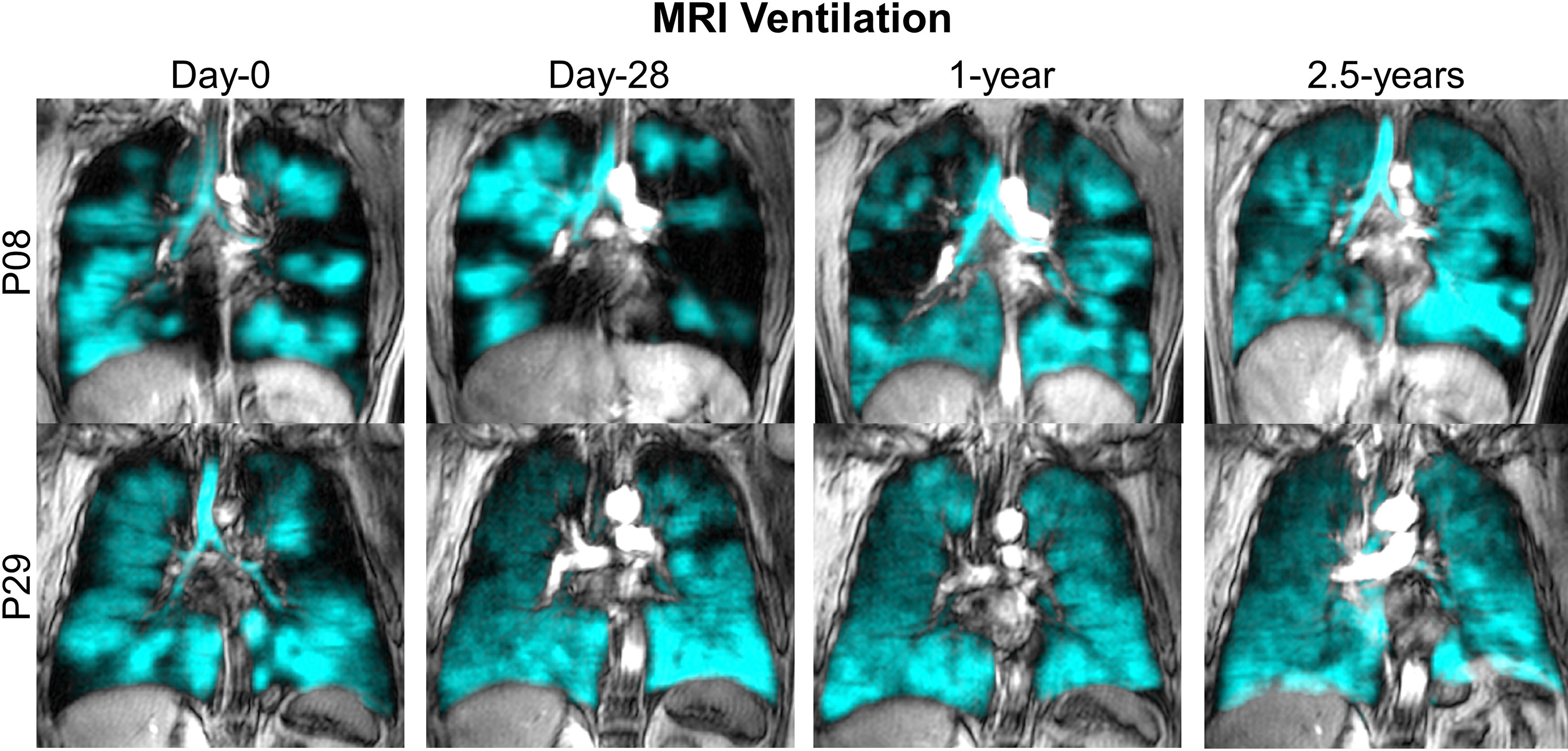
MRI with inhaled ^{129}Xe shows improved ventilation over time. H (grayscale) + ^{129}Xe MRI (cyan) slices at day 0, day 28, 1-y and 2.5-y follow-up, Anti-IL-5Rα (benralizumab)-treated Eosinophilic Asthma

Xenon-129 is a stable nuclide that is inhaled to assess pulmonary function, and to image the lungs by xenon NMR (see image).

== Xenon-133 ==
Xenon-133 is a radioisotope of xenon, beta decaying to stable caesium-133 with half-life 5.2474 days. Sold as a drug under the brand name Xeneisol, (ATC code V09EX03 (WHO)) it is inhaled to assess pulmonary function, and to image the lungs. It is also used to image blood flow, particularly in the brain. ^{133}Xe is a fission product produced by fission of uranium-235. It is discharged to the atmosphere in small quantities by some nuclear power plants.

== Xenon-135 ==
Xenon-135 is a radioactive isotope of xenon, produced as a fission product of uranium. It has a half-life of 9.14 hours and is the most powerful known neutron-absorbing nuclear poison (having a neutron absorption cross-section of about 2 million barns). The overall yield of xenon-135 from fission is 6.3%, without considering any loss by neutron capture. ^{135}Xe exerts a significant effect on nuclear reactor operation (xenon pit). It is discharged to the atmosphere in small quantities by some nuclear power plants.

== Xenon-136 ==
Xenon-136 is an isotope of xenon that undergoes double beta decay to barium-136 with a very long half-life of 2.18×10^{21} years, approximately 11 orders of magnitude longer than the age of the universe. It is being used in the Enriched Xenon Observatory experiment to search for neutrinoless double beta decay.

== See also ==
- Xenon isotope geochemistry

Daughter products other than xenon

- Isotopes of caesium
- Isotopes of iodine
- Isotopes of tellurium
- Isotopes of antimony
