= Iodine pit =

Problem in nuclear reactor start-up

The iodine pit, also called the iodine hole or xenon pit, is a temporary disabling of a nuclear reactor due to the buildup of short-lived neutron poisons in the reactor core. The main isotope responsible is ^{135}Xe, mainly produced by beta decay of ^{135}I. ^{135}I is a weak neutron absorber, while ^{135}Xe is the strongest known neutron absorber. When ^{135}Xe builds up in the fuel rods of a reactor, it significantly lowers their reactivity, by absorbing a significant amount of the neutrons that provide the nuclear reaction.

The presence of ^{135}I and ^{135}Xe in the reactor is one of the main reasons for its power fluctuations in reaction to change of control rod positions.

The buildup of fission products acting as neutron absorbers is called fission-product poisoning (also reactor poisoning), most importantly ^{135}Xe poisoning; stable absorbers such as ^{149}Sm are likewise treated as fission-product poisons.

== Fission products decay and burnup ==
One of the common fission products is ^{135}Te, which undergoes beta decay with half-life of 19 seconds to ^{135}I. ^{135}I itself is a weak neutron absorber. It builds up in the reactor at a rate proportional to the rate of fission, which is proportional to the reactor thermal power. ^{135}I undergoes beta decay with half-life of 6.57 hours to ^{135}Xe. The yield of ^{135}Xe for uranium fission is 6.3%; about 95% of ^{135}Xe originates from decay of ^{135}I.

^{135}Xe is the most powerful known neutron absorber, with a cross section for thermal neutrons of 2.6×10^{6} barns, so it acts as a "poison" that can slow or stop the chain reaction after a period of operation. This was discovered in the earliest nuclear reactors built by the Manhattan Project for plutonium production. As a result, the designers made provisions in the design to increase the reactor's reactivity (the number of neutrons per fission that go on to fission other atoms of nuclear fuel). ^{135}Xe reactor poisoning played a major role in the Chernobyl disaster.

By neutron capture, ^{135}Xe is transformed ("burned") to ^{136}Xe, which is effectively (Note: Xenon-136 undergoes double beta decay with an extremely long half-life of 2.165×10^{21} years.) stable and does not significantly absorb neutrons.

The burn rate is proportional to the neutron flux, which is proportional to the reactor power; a reactor running at twice the power has twice the xenon burn rate. The production rate is also proportional to reactor power, but due to the half-life time of ^{135}I, this rate depends on the average power over the past several hours.

As a result, a reactor operating at constant power has a fixed steady-state equilibrium concentration, but when lowering reactor power, the ^{135}Xe concentration can increase enough to effectively shut down the reactor. Without enough neutrons to offset their absorption by ^{135}Xe, nor to burn the built-up xenon, the reactor has to be kept in shutdown state for 1–2 days until enough of the ^{135}Xe decays.

^{135}Xe beta-decays with half-life of 9.2 hours to ^{135}Cs; a poisoned core will spontaneously recover after several half-lives. After about 3 days of shutdown, the core can be assumed to be free of ^{135}Xe, without it introducing errors into the reactivity calculations.

The inability of the reactor to be restarted in such state is called xenon precluded start up or dropping into an iodine pit; the duration of this situation is known as xenon dead time, poison outage, or iodine pit depth. Due to the risk of such situations, in the early Soviet nuclear industry, many servicing operations were performed on running reactors, as downtimes longer than an hour led to xenon buildup that could keep the reactor offline for significant time, lower the production of ^{239}Pu, required for nuclear weapons, and would lead to investigations and punishment of the reactor operators.

=== Xenon-135 oscillations ===
The interdependence of ^{135}Xe buildup and the neutron flux can lead to periodic power fluctuations. In large reactors, with little neutron flux coupling between their regions, flux nonuniformities can lead to formation of xenon oscillations, periodic local variations of reactor power moving through the core with a period of about 15 hours. A local variation of neutron flux causes increased burnup of ^{135}Xe and production of ^{135}I, depletion of ^{135}Xe increases the reactivity in the core region. The local power density can change by a factor of three or more, while the average power of the reactor stays more or less unchanged. Strong negative temperature coefficient of reactivity causes damping of these oscillations, and is a desired reactor design feature.

=== Iodine pit behavior ===
Development of (1) concentration of ^{135}Xe and (2) reactor reactivity after reactor shutdown. (Until shutdown the neutron flux was φ = 10^{18} neutrons/m^{2}s.)

The reactivity of the reactor after the shutdown first decreases, then increases again, having a shape of a pit; this gave the "iodine pit" its name. The degree of poisoning, and the depth of the pit and the corresponding duration of the outage, depends on the neutron flux before the shutdown. Iodine pit behavior is not observed in reactors with neutron flux density below 5×10^{12} neutrons cm^{−2}s^{−1}, as the ^{135}Xe is primarily removed by decay instead of neutron capture. As the core reactivity reserve is usually limited to 10% of Dk/k, thermal power reactors tend to use neutron flux at most about 5×10^{13} neutrons cm^{−2}s^{−1} to avoid restart problems after shutdown.

The concentration changes of ^{135}Xe in the reactor core after its shutdown is determined by the short-term power history of the reactor (which determines the initial concentrations of ^{135}I and ^{135}Xe), and then by the half-life differences of the isotopes governing the rates of its production and removal; if the activity of ^{135}I is higher than activity of ^{135}Xe, the concentration of ^{135}Xe will rise, and vice versa.

During reactor operation at a given power level, a secular equilibrium is established within 40–50 hours, when the production rate of iodine-135, its decay to xenon-135, and its burning to xenon-136 and decay to caesium-135 are keeping the xenon-135 amount in the reactor constant at a given power level.

The equilibrium concentration of ^{135}I is proportional to the neutron flux φ. The equilibrium concentration of ^{135}Xe, however, depends very little on neutron flux for φ > 10^{17} neutrons m^{−2}s^{−1}.

Increase of the reactor power, and the increase of neutron flux, causes a rise in production of ^{135}I and consumption of ^{135}Xe. At first, the concentration of xenon decreases, then slowly increases again to a new equilibrium level as now excess ^{135}I decays. During a typical power increase from 50 to 100%, the ^{135}Xe concentration falls for about 3 hours.

Decrease of the reactor power lowers production of new ^{135}I, but also lowers the burn rate of ^{135}Xe. For a while ^{135}Xe builds up, governed by the amount of available ^{135}I, then its concentration decreases again to an equilibrium for the given reactor power level. The peak concentration of ^{135}Xe occurs after about 11.1 hours after power decrease, and then equilibrium is reached after about 50 hours. A total shutdown of the reactor is an extreme case of power decrease.

== Design precautions ==
If sufficient reactivity control authority is available, the reactor can be restarted, but a xenon burn-out transient must be carefully managed. As the control rods are extracted and criticality is reached, neutron flux increases many orders of magnitude and the ^{135}Xe begins to absorb neutrons and be transmuted to ^{136}Xe. The reactor burns off the nuclear poison. As this happens, the reactivity increases and the control rods must be gradually re-inserted or reactor power will increase. The time constant for this burn-off transient depends on the reactor design, power level history of the reactor for the past several days (therefore the ^{135}Xe and ^{135}I concentrations present), and the new power setting. For a typical step up from 50% power to 100% power, ^{135}Xe concentration falls for about 3 hours.

The first time ^{135}Xe poisoning of a nuclear reactor occurred was on September 28, 1944, in Pile 100-B at the Hanford Site. The B Reactor was a plutonium production reactor built by DuPont as part of the Manhattan Project. The reactor was started on September 27, 1944, but the power dropped unexpectedly shortly after, leading to a complete shutdown on the evening of September 28. Next morning the reaction restarted by itself. The physicists John Archibald Wheeler, working for DuPont at the time, and Enrico Fermi were able to identify that the drop in the neutron flux and the consequent shutdown was caused by the accumulation of ^{135}Xe in the reactor fuel. The reactor was built with spare fuel channels that were then used to increase the normal operating levels of the reactor, thus increasing the burn-up rate of the accumulating ^{135}Xe.

Reactors with large physical dimensions, e.g. the RBMK type, can develop significant nonuniformities of xenon concentration through the core. Control of such non-homogeneously poisoned cores, especially at low power, is a challenging problem. The Chernobyl disaster occurred after recovering Reactor 4 from a nonuniformly poisoned state. Reactor power was significantly reduced in preparation for a test, to be followed by a scheduled shutdown. Just before the test, the power plummeted in part due to the accumulation of ^{135}Xe as a result of the low burn-up rate at low power. Operators withdrew most of the control rods in an attempt to bring the power back up. Unbeknownst to the operators, these and other actions put the reactor in a state where it was exposed to a feedback loop of neutron power and steam production. A flawed shutdown system then caused a power surge that led to the explosion and destruction of reactor 4.

The iodine pit effect has to be taken in account for reactor designs. High values of power density, leading to high production rates of fission products and therefore higher iodine concentrations, require higher amount and enrichment of the nuclear fuel used to compensate. Without this reactivity reserve, a reactor shutdown would preclude its restart for several tens of hours until ^{135}I/^{135}Xe sufficiently decays, especially shortly before replacement of spent fuel (with high burnup and accumulated nuclear poisons) with fresh fuel.

Fluid fuel reactors cannot develop xenon inhomogeneity because the fuel is free to mix. Also, the Molten Salt Reactor Experiment demonstrated that spraying the liquid fuel as droplets through a gas space during recirculation can allow xenon and krypton to leave the fuel salts. (Note: Removing ^{135}Xe from neutron exposure also means that the reactor will produce more of the long-lived fission product ^{135}Cs. However, thanks to the short 3.8-minute half-life of ^{137}Xe it will mostly decay in the fuel, leaving the ^{135}Cs significantly less contaminated with the far more active ^{137}Cs and so more suitable for treatments like nuclear transmutation.)
