= Xenon isotope geochemistry =

Method of geochemical research

Xenon isotope geochemistry uses the abundance of xenon (Xe) isotopes and total xenon to investigate how Xe has been generated, transported, fractionated, and distributed in planetary systems. Xe has nine stable or very long-lived isotopes. Radiogenic ^{129}Xe and fissiogenic ^{131,132,134,136}Xe isotopes are of special interest in geochemical research. The radiogenic and fissiogenic properties can be used in deciphering the early chronology of Earth. Elemental Xe in the atmosphere is depleted and isotopically enriched in heavier isotopes relative to estimated solar abundances. The depletion and heavy isotopic enrichment can be explained by hydrodynamic escape to space that occurred in Earth's early atmosphere. Differences in the Xe isotope distribution between the deep mantle (from Ocean Island Basalts, or OIBs), shallower Mid-ocean Ridge Basalts (MORBs), and the atmosphere can be used to deduce Earth's history of formation and differentiation of the solid Earth into layers.

== Background ==
Xe is the heaviest noble gas in the Earth's atmosphere. It has seven stable isotopes (^{126}Xe,^{128}Xe,^{129}Xe,^{130}Xe,^{131}Xe, ^{132}Xe, ^{134}Xe) and two isotopes (^{124}Xe, ^{136}Xe) with long-lived half-lives. Xe has four synthetic radioisotopes with very short half-lives, usually less than one month. Xenon-129 can be used to examine the early history of the Earth. ^{129}Xe was derived from the extinct nuclide of iodine, iodine-129 or ^{129}I (with a half-life of 15.7 Million years, or Myr), which can be used in iodine-xenon (I-Xe) dating. The production of ^{129}Xe stopped within about 100 Myr after the start of the Solar System because ^{129}I became extinct. In the modern atmosphere, about 6.8% of atmospheric ^{129}Xe originated from the decay ^{129}I in the first ~100 Myr of the Solar System's history, i.e., during and immediately following Earth's accretion.

Fissiogenic Xe isotopes were generated mainly from the extinct nuclide, plutonium-244 or ^{244}Pu (half-life of 80 Myr), and also the extant nuclide, uranium-238 or ^{238}U (half-life of 4468 Myr). Spontaneous fission of ^{238}U has generated ~5% as much fissiogenic Xe as ^{244}Pu. Pu and U fission produce the four fissiogenic isotopes, ^{136}Xe, ^{134}Xe, ^{132}Xe, and ^{131}Xe in distinct proportions. A reservoir that remains an entirely closed system over Earth's history has a ratio of Pu- to U-derived fissiogenic Xe reaching to ~27. Accordingly, the isotopic composition of the fissiogenic Xe for a closed-system reservoir would largely resemble that produced from pure ^{244}Pu fission. Loss of Xe from a reservoir after ^{244}Pu becomes extinct (500 Myr) would lead to a greater contribution of ^{238}U fission to the fissiogenic Xe.

=== Notation ===
Differences in the abundance of isotopes among natural samples are extremely small (almost always below 0.1% or 1 per mille). Nevertheless, these very small differences can record meaningful geological processes. To compare these tiny but meaningful differences, isotope abundances in natural materials are often reported relative to isotope abundances in designated standards, with the delta (δ) notation. The absolute values of Xe isotopes are normalized to atmospheric ^{130}Xe. Define $\rm \delta_{Xe}=[(^iXe/^{130}Xe)_{sample}/(^iXe/^{130}Xe)_{atm}-1]\times 1000$ where i = 124, 126, 128, 129, 131, 132, 134, 136.

== Applications ==
=== The age of Earth ===
Iodine-129 decays with a half-life of 15.7 Ma into ^{129}Xe, resulting in excess ^{129}Xe in primitive meteorites relative to primordial Xe isotopic compositions. The property of ^{129}I can be used in radiometric chronology. However, as detailed below, the age of Earth's formation cannot be deduced directly from I-Xe dating. The major problem is the Xe closure time, or the time when the early Earth system stopped gaining substantial new material from space. When the Earth became closed for the I-Xe system, Xe isotope evolution began to obey a simple radioactive decay law as shown below and became predictable.

The principle of radiogenic chronology is, if at time t_{1} the quantity of a radioisotope is P_{1} while at some previous time this quantity was P_{0}, the interval between t_{1} and t_{0} is given by the law of radioactive decay as

$\rm \Delta t = t_1-t_0=(1/\lambda)ln(P_0/P_1)$

Here $\lambda$ is the decay constant of the radioisotope, which is the probability of decay per nucleus per unit time. The decay constant is related to the half-life t_{1/2}, by t_{1/2}= ln(2)/$\lambda$

==== Calculations ====
The I-Xe system was first applied in 1975 to estimate the age of the Earth. For all Xe isotopes, the initial isotope composition of iodine in the Earth is given by

$\rm \left(\frac{^{129}I}{^{127}I}\right)_E=\left(\frac{^{129}I}{^{127}I}\right)_0e^{-\lambda \Delta t_E}$ where $\rm \left(\frac{^{129}I}{^{127}I}\right)_E$ is the isotopic ratios of iodine at the time that Earth primarily formed, $\rm \left(\frac{^{129}I}{^{127}I}\right)_0$ is the isotopic ratio of iodine at the end of stellar nucleosynthesis, and $\rm \Delta t _E$ is the time interval between the end of stellar nucleosynthesis and the formation of the Earth. The estimated iodine-127 concentration in the Bulk Silicate Earth (BSE) (= crust + mantle average) ranges from 7 to 10 parts per billion (ppb) by mass. If the BSE represents Earth's chemical composition, the total ^{127}I in the BSE ranges from 2.26×10^{17} to 3.23×10^{17} moles. The meteorite Bjurböle is 4.56 billion years old with an initial ^{129}I/^{127}I ratio of 1.1×10^{−4}, so an equation can be derived as

$\rm \left(\frac{^{129}I}{^{127}I}\right)_E=\left(\frac{^{129}I}{^{127}I}\right)_Be^{-\lambda (\Delta t_E-\Delta t_B)}$

where $\rm \Delta t_E-\Delta t_B$ is the interval between the formation of the Earth and the formation of meteorite Bjurböle. Given the half-life of ^{129}I of 15.7 Myr, and assuming that all the initial ^{129}I has decayed to ^{129}Xe, the following equation can be derived:

$\rm \Delta t_E -\Delta t_B =\frac{1}{\lambda}\ln\left(\frac{(^{129}I/^{127}I)_B}{(^{129}I/^{127}I)_E}\right)=\frac{1}{\lambda} ln\left(\frac{(^{129}I/^{127}I)_B}{(^{129}Xe/^{127}I)_{BSE}}\right)$

^{129}Xe in the modern atmosphere is 3.63×10^{13} grams. The iodine content for BSE lies between 10 and 12 ppb by mass. Consequently, $\rm \Delta t_E -\Delta t_B$ should be 108 Myr, i.e., the Xe-closure age is 108 Myr younger than the age of meteorite Bjurböle. The estimated Xe closure time was ~4.45 billion years ago when the growing Earth started to retain Xe in its atmosphere, which is coincident with ages derived from other geochronology dating methods.

==== Xe closure age problem ====
There are some disputes about using I-Xe dating to estimate the Xe closure time. First, in the early solar system, planetesimals collided and grew into larger bodies that accreted to form the Earth. But there could be a 10^{7} to 10^{8} years time gap in Xe closure time between the Earth's inner and outer regions. Some research support 4.45 Ga probably represents the time when the last giant impactor (Martian-size) hit Earth, but some regard it as the time of core-mantle differentiation. The second problem is that the total inventory of ^{129}Xe on Earth may be larger than that of the atmosphere since the lower mantle hadn't been entirely mixed, which may underestimate ^{129}Xe in the calculation. Last but not least, if Xe gas not been lost from the atmosphere during a long interval of early Earth's history, the chronology based on ^{129}I-^{129}Xe would need revising since ^{129}Xe and ^{127}Xe could be greatly altered.

=== Loss of earth's earliest atmosphere ===
Compared with solar xenon, Earth's atmospheric Xe is enriched in heavy isotopes by 3 to 4% per atomic mass unit (amu). However, the total abundance of xenon gas is depleted by one order of magnitude relative to other noble gases. The elemental depletion while relative enrichment in heavy isotopes is called the (missing) xenon paradox. A possible explanation is that some processes can specifically diminish xenon rather than other light noble gases (e.g. Krypton) and preferentially remove lighter Xe isotopes.

In the last 2 decades, two categories of models have been proposed to solve the xenon paradox. The first assumes that the Earth accreted from porous planetesimals, and isotope fractionation happened due to gravitational separation. However, this model cannot reproduce the abundance and isotopic composition of light noble gases in the atmosphere. The second category supposes a massive impact resulted in an aerodynamic drag on heavier gases. Both the aerodynamic drag and the downward gravitational effect lead to a mass-dependent loss of Xe gases. But following research suggested that Xe isotope mass fractionation shouldn't be a rapid, single event.

Research published since 2018 on noble gases preserved in Archean (3.5–3.0 Ga old) samples may provide a solution to the Xe paradox. Isotopically mass fractionated Xe is found in tiny inclusions of ancient seawater in Archean barite and hydrothermal quartz. The distribution of Xe isotopes lies between the primordial solar and the modern atmospheric Xe isotope patterns. The isotopic fractionation gradually increases relative to the solar distribution as Earth evolves over its first 2 billion years. This two billion-year history of evolving Xe fractionation coincides with early solar system conditions including high solar extreme ultraviolet (EUV) radiation and large impacts that could energize large rates of hydrogen escape to space that are big enough to drag out xenon. However, models of neutral xenon atoms escaping cannot resolve the problem that other lighter noble gas elements don't show the signal of depletion or mass-dependent fractionation. For example, because Kr is lighter than Xe, Kr should also have escaped in a neutral wind. Yet the isotopic distribution of atmospheric Kr on Earth is significantly less fractionated than atmospheric Xe.

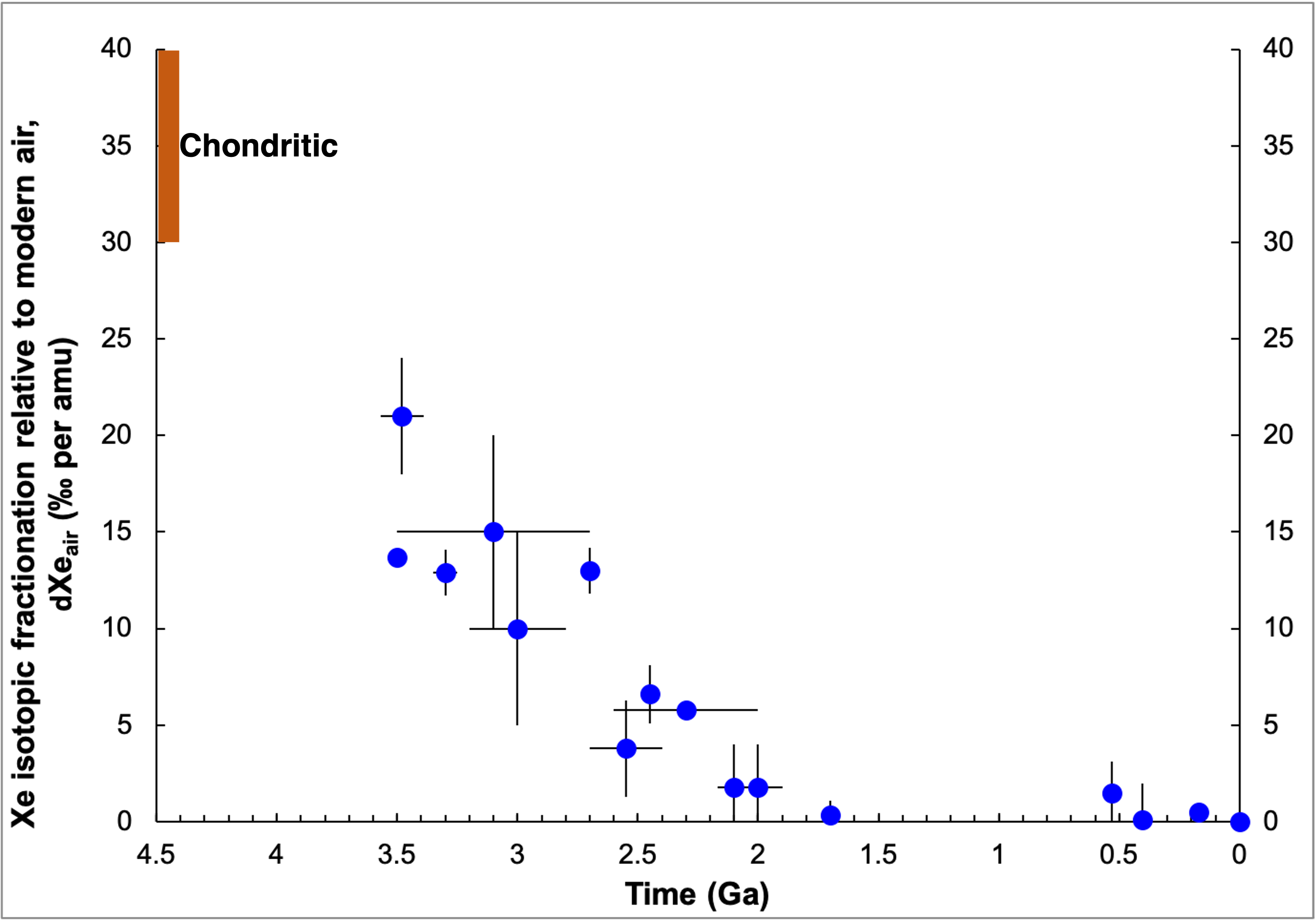
Mass fractionation of nine atmospheric xenon isotopes over Earth's history compared to modern air per atomic mass unit. The Xe isotope distribution is derived from fluid inclusions in ancient rocks. Xenon isotope fractionation reached the modern value around 2 billion years ago (2 Ga). The cessation of fractionation may related to oxygenation of the Earth's atmosphere. Figure simplified with permission.

A current explanation is that hydrodynamic escape can preferentially remove lighter atmospheric species and lighter isotopes of Xe in the form of charged ions instead of neutral atoms. Hydrogen is liberated from hydrogen-bearing gases (H_{2} or CH_{4}) by photolysis in the early Earth atmosphere. Hydrogen is light and can be abundant at the top of the atmosphere and escape. In the polar regions where there are open magnetic field lines, hydrogen ions can drag ionized Xe out from the atmosphere to space even though neutral Xe cannot escape.

The mechanism is summarized as below.

Xe can be directly photo-ionized by UV radiation in range of $91.2\ \rm{nm}<\lambda<102.3nm$

$\rm Xe+hv\rightarrow Xe^+ +e^-$

Or Xe can be ionized by change exchange with H_{2} and CO_{2} through

$\rm CO_2^+ +Xe\rightarrow CO_2+Xe^+$

$\rm H_2^++Xe\rightarrow HXe^+ +H$

where H^{+} and CO_{2}^{+} can come from EUV dissociation. Xe^{+} is chemically inert in H, H_{2}, or CO_{2} atmospheres. As a result, Xe^{+} tends to persist. These ions interact strongly with each other through the Coulomb force and are finally dragged away by strong ancient polar wind. Isotope mass fractionation accumulates as lighter isotopes of Xe^{+} preferentially escape from the Earth. A preliminary model suggests that Xe can escape in the Archean if the atmosphere contains >1% H_{2} or >0.5% methane.

When O_{2} levels increased in the atmosphere, Xe^{+} could exchange positive charge with O_{2} though

$\rm Xe^++O_2\rightarrow Xe+O_2^+$

From this reaction, Xe escape stopped when the atmosphere became enriched in O_{2}. As a result, Xe isotope fractionation may provide insights into the long history of hydrogen escape that ended with the Great Oxidation Event (GOE). Understanding Xe isotopes is promising to reconstruct hydrogen or methane escape history that irreversibly oxidized the Earth and drove biological evolution toward aerobic ecological systems. Other factors, such as the hydrogen (or methane) concentration becoming too low or EUV radiation from the aging Sun becoming too weak, can also cease the hydrodynamic escape of Xe, but are not mutually exclusive.

Organic hazes on Archean Earth could also scavenge isotopically heavy Xe. Ionized Xe can be chemically incorporated into organic materials, going through the terrestrial weathering cycle on the surface. The trapped Xe is mass fractionated by about 1% per amu in heavier isotopes but they may be released again and recover the original unfractionated composition, making them not sufficient to totally resolve Xe paradox.

==== Comparison between Kr and Xe in the atmosphere ====
Observed atmospheric Xe is depleted relative to Chondritic meteorites by a factor of 4 to 20 when compared to Kr. In contrast, the stable isotopes of Kr are barely fractionated. This mechanism is unique to Xe since Kr^{+} ions are quickly neutralized via

$\rm Kr^+ +H_2\rightarrow KrH^+ +H$

$\rm KrH^+ +e^-\rightarrow Kr+H$

Therefore, Kr can be rapidly returned to neutral and wouldn't be dragged away by the charged ion wind in the polar region. Hence Kr is retained in the atmosphere.

==== Relation with Mass Independent Fraction of Sulfur Isotopes (MIF-S) ====
The signal of mass-independent fractionation of sulfur isotopes, known as MIF-S, correlates with the end of Xe isotope fractionation. During the Great Oxidation Event (GOE), the ozone layer formed when O_{2} rose, accounting for the end of the MIF-S signature. The disappearance of the MIF-S signal has been regarded as changing the redox ratio of Earth's surface reservoirs. However, potential memory effects of MIF-S due to oxidative weathering can lead to large uncertainty on the process and chronology of GOE. Compared to the MIF-S signals, hydrodynamic escape of Xe is not affected by the ozone formation and may be even more sensitive to O_{2} availability, promising to provide more details about the oxidation history of Earth.

=== Xe Isotopes as mantle tracers ===
Xe isotopes are also promising in tracing mantle dynamics in Earth's evolution. The first explicit recognition of non-atmospheric Xe in terrestrial samples came from the analysis of CO_{2}-well gas in New Mexico, displaying an excess of ^{129}I-derived or primitive source ^{129}Xe and high content in ^{131-136}Xe due to the decay of ^{238}U. At present, the excess of ^{129}Xe and ^{131-136}Xe has been widely observed in mid-ocean ridge basalt (MORBs) and Oceanic island basalt (OIBs). Because ^{136}Xe receives more fissiogenic contribution than other heavy Xe isotopes, ^{129}Xe (decay of ^{129}I) and ^{136}Xe are usually normalized to ^{130}Xe when discussing Xe isotope trends of different mantle sources. MORBs' ^{129}Xe/^{130}Xe and ^{136}Xe/^{130}Xe ratios lie on a trend from atmospheric ratios to higher values and seemingly contaminated by the air. Oceanic island basalt (OIBs) data lies lower than those in MORBs, implying different Xe sources for OIBs and MORBs.

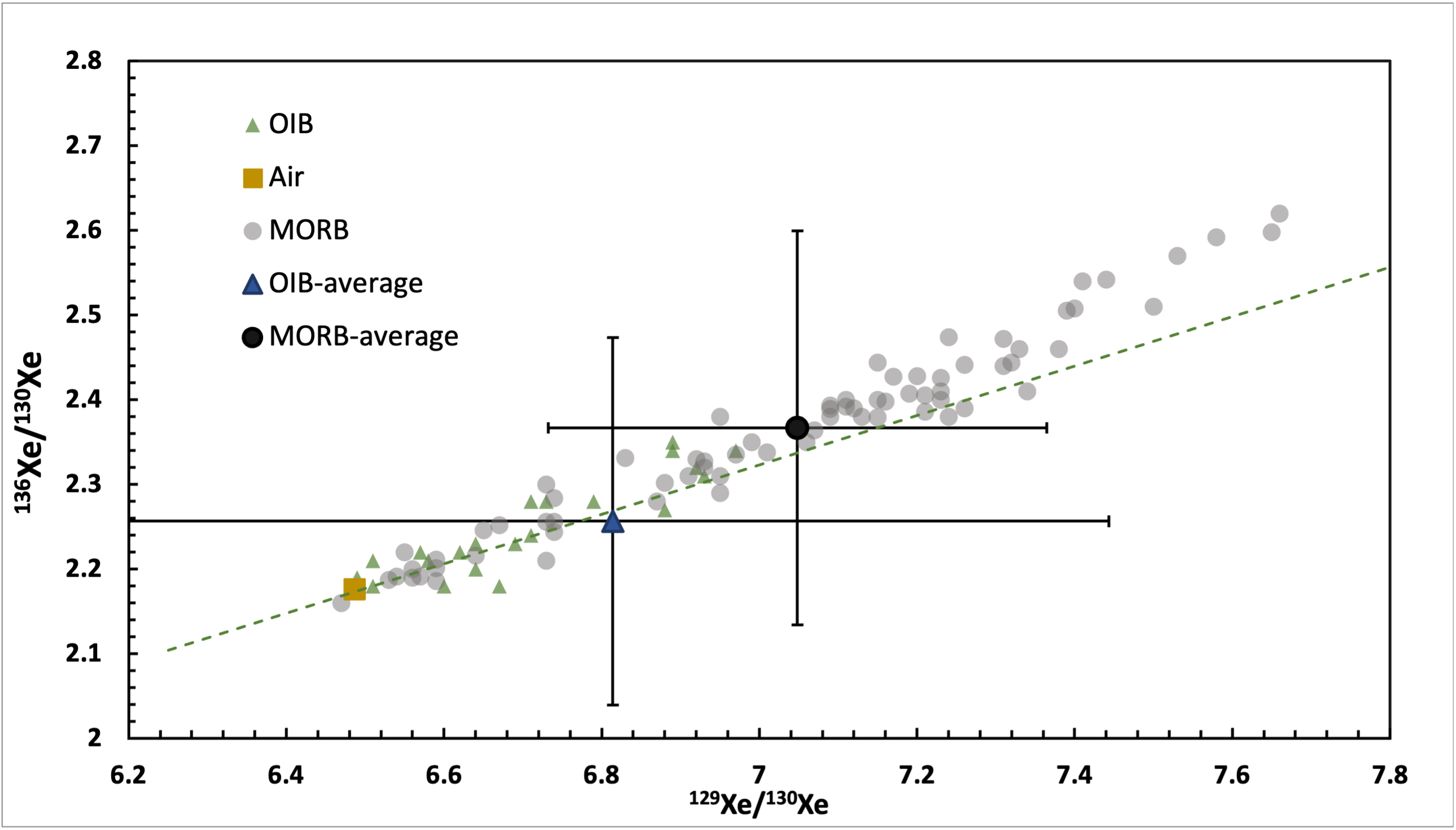
Selected Xe isotope data in mid-ocean ridge basalts (MORBs) and ocean island basalts (OIBs), compared with atmospheric value. Slope = 0.32. Figure is modified and simplified.

The deviations in ^{129}Xe/^{130}Xe ratio between air and MORBs show that mantle degassing occurred before ^{129}I was extinct, otherwise ^{129}Xe/^{130}Xe in the air would be the same as in the mantle. The differences in the ^{129}Xe/^{130}Xe ratio between MORBs and OIBs may indicate that the mantle reservoirs are still not thoroughly mixed. The chemical differences between OIBs and MORBs still await discovery.

To obtain mantle Xe isotope ratios, it is necessary to remove contamination by atmospheric Xe, which could start before 2.5 billion years ago. Theoretically, the many non-radiogenic isotopic ratios (^{124}Xe/^{130}Xe, ^{126}Xe/^{130}Xe, and ^{128}Xe/^{130}Xe) can be used to accurately correct for atmospheric contamination if slight differences between air and mantle can be precisely measured. Still, we cannot reach such precision with current techniques.

=== Xe in other planets ===
==== Mars ====
On Mars, Xe isotopes in the present atmosphere are mass fractionated relative to their primordial composition from in situ measurement of the Curiosity Rover at Gale Crater, Mars. Paleo-atmospheric Xe trapped in the Martian regolith breccia NWA 11220 is mass-dependently fractionated relative to solar Xe by ~16.2‰. The extent of fractionation is comparable for Mars and Earth, which may be compelling evidence that hydrodynamic escape also occurred in the Mars history. The regolith breccia NWA7084 and the >4 Ga orthopyroxene ALH84001 Martian meteorites trap ancient Martian atmospheric gases with little if any Xe isotopic fractionation relative to modern Martian atmospheric Xe. Alternative models for Mars consider that the isotopic fractionation and escape of Mars atmospheric Xe occurred very early in the planet's history and ceased around a few hundred million years after planetary formation rather than continuing during its evolutionary history

==== Venus ====
Xe has not been detected in Venus's atmosphere. ^{132}Xe has an upper limit of 10 parts per billion by volume. The absence of data on the abundance of Xe precludes us from evaluating if the abundance of Xe is close to solar values or if there is Xe paradox on Venus. The lack also prevents us from checking if the isotopic composition has been mass dependently fractionated, as in the case of Earth and Mars.

==== Jupiter ====
Jupiter's atmosphere has 2.5 ± 0.5 times the solar abundance values for Xenon and similarly elevated argon and krypton (2.1 ± 0.5 and 2.7 ± 0.5 times solar values separately). These signals of enrichment are due to these elements coming to Jupiter in very cold (T<30K) icy planetesimals.

== See also ==
- Geochronology
- Isotopes of Xenon
