= C8H7NO =

The molecular formula C_{8}H_{7}NO (molar mass: 133.14728 g/mol, exact mass: 133.052764 u) may refer to:

- 4-Hydroxyphenylacetonitrile
- 5-Hydroxyindole
- Indoxyl
- Mandelonitrile
- Oxindole (2-indolone)
