= C8H9NO =

The molecular formula C_{8}H_{9}NO may refer to:

- Acetanilide
- Phenacylamine
- 5-hydroxyindoline
