= Hydroxyindole =

Hydroxyindole may refer to:

- 2-Hydroxyindole (oxindole)
- 3-Hydroxyindole (indoxyl)
- 5-Hydroxyindole
