= Iodine-129 =

Radioisotope of iodine

General
- Symbol: ^{129}I
- Names: iodine-129
- Protons (Z): 53
- Neutrons (N): 76

Nuclide data
- Natural abundance: Trace
- Half-life (t_{1/2}): 1.614(12)×10^{7} years
- Isotope mass: 128.9049836(34) Da
- Decay products: ^{129}Xe

Decay modes
- Decay mode: Decay energy (MeV)
- β^{−}: 0.189

Iodine-129 (^{129}I) is a long-lived radioisotope of iodine that occurs naturally, but is of greater interest as a man-made nuclear fission product, where it is a potential radiological contaminant. The same contamination, though, together with its long half-life, make it serve as a tracer of environmental processes that have nothing to do with its creation.

== Formation and decay ==
Long-lived fission products
Nuclide	t_{1/2}	Yield	Q (Note: Decay energy is split among β, neutrino, and γ if any.)	βγ
	(Ma)	(%) (Note: Per 65 thermal neutron fissions of ^{235}U and 35 of ^{239}Pu.)	(keV)	
^{99}Tc	0.211	6.1385	294	β
^{126}Sn	0.23	0.1084	4050 (Note: Has decay energy 380 keV, but its decay product ^{126}Sb has decay energy 3.67 MeV.)	βγ
^{79}Se	0.33	0.0447	151	β
^{135}Cs	1.33	6.9110 (Note: Lower in thermal reactors because ^{135}Xe, its predecessor, readily absorbs neutrons.)	269	β
^{93}Zr	1.61	5.4575	91	βγ
^{107}Pd	6.5	1.2499	33	β
^{129}I	16.1	0.8410	194	βγ

^{129}I is one of seven long-lived fission products. It is primarily formed from the fission of uranium and plutonium in nuclear reactors. Significant amounts have been released into the atmosphere by nuclear weapons testing in the 1950s and 1960s, by nuclear reactor accidents, and most of all by the (both military and civilian) reprocessing of spent nuclear fuel.

It is also naturally produced in small quantities, due to the spontaneous fission of natural uranium, by cosmic ray spallation of trace levels of xenon in the atmosphere, and by cosmic ray muons striking tellurium-130.

^{129}I decays with a half-life of 16.14 million years, with low-energy beta and gamma emissions, to stable xenon-129 (^{129}Xe).

== Long-lived fission product ==
^{129}I is one of the seven long-lived fission products that are produced in significant amounts. Its yield is 0.706% per fission of ^{235}U. Larger proportions of other iodine isotopes such as ^{131}I are produced, but because these all have short half-lives, iodine in cooled spent nuclear fuel consists of about 5/6 ^{129}I and 1/6 the only stable iodine isotope, ^{127}I.

Because ^{129}I is long-lived and relatively mobile in the environment, it is of particular importance in long-term management of spent nuclear fuel. In a deep geological repository for unreprocessed used fuel, ^{129}I is the radionuclide of most very-long-term concern as it may seep out of an undisturbed repository before it has decayed.

Since ^{129}I has a modest neutron absorption cross-section of 30 barns, and is relatively undiluted by other isotopes of the same element, it is being studied for disposal by nuclear transmutation by re-irradiation with neutrons or gamma irradiation.

Yield, % per fission
	Thermal	Fast	14 MeV
^{232}Th	not fissile	0.431 ± 0.089	1.68 ± 0.33
^{233}U	1.63 ± 0.26	1.73 ± 0.24	3.01 ± 0.43
^{235}U	0.706 ± 0.032	1.03 ± 0.26	1.59 ± 0.18
^{238}U	not fissile	0.622 ± 0.034	1.66 ± 0.19
^{239}Pu	1.407 ± 0.086	1.31 ± 0.13	?
^{241}Pu	1.28 ± 0.36	1.67 ± 0.36	?

== Release by nuclear fuel reprocessing ==
A large fraction of the ^{129}I contained in spent fuel is released into the gas phase, when spent fuel is first chopped and then dissolved in boiling nitric acid during reprocessing. At least for civil reprocessing plants, special scrubbers are supposed to withhold 99.5% (or more) of the Iodine by adsorption, before exhaust air is released into the environment. However, the Northeastern Radiological Health Laboratory (NERHL) found, during their measurements at the first US civil reprocessing plant, which was operated by Nuclear Fuel Services, Inc. (NFS) in Western New York, that "between 5 and 10% of the total ^{129}I available from the dissolved fuel" was released into the exhaust stack. They further wrote that "these values are greater than predicted output (Table 1). This was expected since the iodine scrubbers were not operating during the dissolution cycles monitored."

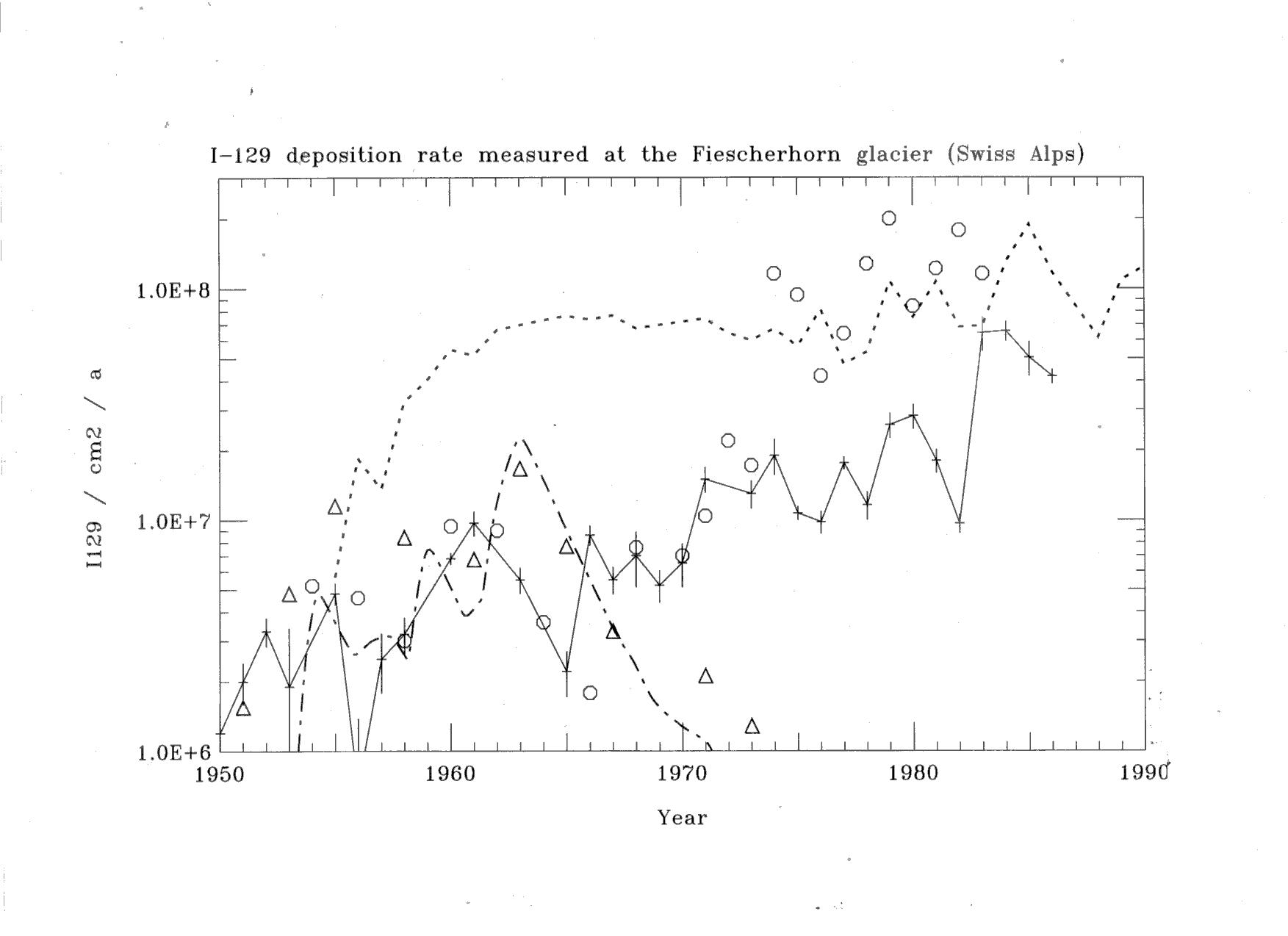
Straight Line: I-129-deposits at Fiescherhorn glacier (Switzerland): dashed line: estimate of the I-129-deposit rate from the increase of the atmospheric Kr-85 concentration dot-dash: calculated bomb fallout triangles: from Cs-137 data calculated I-129 fallout circles: tree ring data Karlsruhe

The Northeastern Radiological Health Laboratory further states that, due to limitations of their measuring systems, the actual release of ^{129}I may have even been higher, "since [^{129}I] losses [by adsorption] probably occurred in the piping and ductwork between the stack and the sampler". Furthermore, the sample taking system used by the NERHL had a bubbler trap for measuring the tritium content of the gas samples before the iodine trap. The NERHL found out only after taking the samples that "the bubbler trap retained 60 to 90% of the ^{129}I sampled". NERHL concluded: "The bubblers located upstream of the ion exchangers removed a major portion of the gaseous ^{129}I before it reached the ion exchange sampler. The iodine removal ability of the bubbler was anticipated, but not in the magnitude that it occurred." The documented release of "between 5 and 10% of the total ^{129}I available from the dissolved fuel" is not corrected for those two measurement deficiencies.

Military isolation of plutonium from spent fuel has also released ^{129}I to the atmosphere: "More than 685,000 curies of iodine 131 spewed from the stacks of Hanford's separation plants in the first three years of operation." As ^{129}I and ^{131}I have very similar physical and chemical properties, and no isotope separation was performed at Hanford, ^{129}I must have also been released there in large quantities during the Manhattan project. As Hanford reprocessed "hot" fuel, that had been irradiated in a reactor only a few months earlier, the activity of the released short-lived ^{131}I, with a half-life time of just 8 days, was much higher than that of the long-lived ^{129}I. However, while all of the ^{131}I released during the times of the Manhattan project has decayed by now, over 99.999% of the ^{129}I is still in the environment.

Ice borehole data obtained from the university of Bern at the Fiescherhorn glacier in the Alpian mountains at a height of 3950 m show a somewhat steady increase in the ^{129}I deposit rate (shown in the image as a solid line) with time. In particular, the highest values obtained in 1983 and 1984 are about six times as high as the maximum that was measured during the period of the atmospheric bomb testing in 1961. This strong increase following the conclusion of the atmospheric bomb testing indicates that nuclear fuel reprocessing has been the primary source of atmospheric iodine-129 since then. These measurements lasted until 1986.

== Applications ==
=== Groundwater age dating ===
^{129}I is not deliberately produced for any practical purposes. However, its long half-life and its relative mobility in the environment have made it useful for a variety of dating applications. These include identifying older groundwaters based on the amount of natural ^{129}I (or its ^{129}Xe decay product) present, as well as identifying younger groundwaters by the increased anthropogenic ^{129}I levels since the 1960s.

=== Meteorite age dating ===
In 1960, physicist John H. Reynolds discovered that certain meteorites contained an isotopic anomaly in the form of an overabundance of ^{129}Xe. He inferred that this must be a decay product of long-decayed radioactive ^{129}I. This isotope is produced in quantity in nature only in supernova explosions. As the half-life of ^{129}I is comparatively short in astronomical terms, this demonstrated that only a short time had passed between the supernova and the time the meteorites had solidified and trapped the ^{129}I. These two events (supernova and solidification of gas cloud) were inferred to have happened during the early history of the Solar System, as the ^{129}I isotope was likely generated before the Solar System was formed, but not long before, and seeded the solar gas cloud isotopes with isotopes from a second source. This supernova source may also have caused collapse of the solar gas cloud.

== See also ==
- Isotopes of iodine
- Iodine in biology
