= Inhibitor =

Inhibitor or inhibition may refer to:

== Biology ==
- Enzyme inhibitor, a substance that binds to an enzyme and decreases the enzyme's activity
- Reuptake inhibitor, a substance that increases neurotransmission by blocking the reuptake of a neurotransmitter
- Lateral inhibition, a neural mechanism that increases contrast between active and (neighbouring) inactive neurons
- Inhibitory postsynaptic potential, a synaptic potential that decreases the firing of a neuron

== Chemistry ==
- Corrosion inhibitor, a substance that decreases the rate of metal oxidation
- Reaction inhibitor, a substance that prevents or decreases the rate of a chemical reaction
- Polymerisation inhibitor, a substance that inhibits unwanted polymerisation of monomers

== Psychology ==
- Cognitive inhibition, the mind's ability to tune out irrelevant stimuli
  - Inhibitory control, a cognitive process that permits an individual to inhibit their impulses
- Inhibition of return, a feature of attention
- Latent inhibition, a term used in classical conditioning
- Memory inhibition, processes that suppress or interfere with specific memories
- Sexual inhibition, reservations relating to sexual practices
- Social inhibition, a conditioned fear reaction to social marginalization or isolation

== Media ==
- Inhibitors, machines in the Revelation Space novels by Alastair Reynolds
- Inhibitions (song), a 2008 single by Swedish band Alcazar
- Inhibition (album), the debut album by alternative rock band Dot Hacker

== Other uses ==
- Inhibition (law)

== See also ==
- Preservative, a substance that inhibits spoilage
  - Embalming, the preservation of human remains
  - Food preservation, the inhibition of microbial growth in food
- Nuclear poison, an inhibitor of nuclear reactions
- League of Legends, structure which spawns super minions
