= 5-Hydroxyindoline =

Names
- IUPAC name 2,3-dihydro-1H-indol-5-ol
- Other names 2,3-dihydro-1H-indol-5-ol

Identifiers
CAS Number	172078-33-0
3D model (JSmol)	Interactive image
ChEMBL	ChEMBL19331
ChemSpider	8210249
PubChem CID	10034684
CompTox Dashboard (EPA)	DTXSID40434426
- InChI: InChI=1S/C8H9NO/c10-7-1-2-8-6(5-7)3-4-9-8/h1-2,5,9-10H,3-4H2 Key: MPCXQPXCYDDJSR-UHFFFAOYSA-N
- SMILES: C1CNC2=C1C=C(C=C2)O

Properties
Chemical formula	C_{8}H_{9}NO
Molar mass	135.166 g·mol^{−1}
Density	1.2±0.1 g/cm³
- Except where otherwise noted, data are given for materials in their standard state (at 25 °C [77 °F], 100 kPa). Infobox references

5-Hydroxyindoline, also known as 2,3-dihydro-1H-indol-5-ol, is a psychoactive substance, saturated (hydrogenated) derivative of indole, which has a hydroxyl group in the 5th position of the benzene ring, structurally belong to the family of indoline derivatives.

== Pharmacology ==
5-Hydroxyindoline has shown superior results as a dopamine D4 receptor ligand, with more selective binding than classical dopaminergic drugs. It is a D4 receptor agonist.

Other studies have shown that 5-hydroxyindoline is an inhibitor of the D2 dopamine receptor.

== Occurrence ==
5-Hydroxyindoline was found and isolated from Phoebe chekiangensis.
