= 5-Hydroxyindole =

Identifiers
CAS Number	1953-54-4
3D model (JSmol)	Interactive image
ChEBI	CHEBI:89649
ChEMBL	ChEMBL404923
ChemSpider	110544
ECHA InfoCard	100.016.166
EC Number	217-782-6
IUPHAR/BPS	2295
PubChem CID	16054
UNII	320UN7XZYN
CompTox Dashboard (EPA)	DTXSID00173187
- InChI: InChI=1S/C8H7NO/c10-7-1-2-8-6(5-7)3-4-9-8/h1-5,9-10H Key: LMIQERWZRIFWNZ-UHFFFAOYSA-N
- SMILES: C1=CC2=C(C=CN2)C=C1O

Properties
Chemical formula	C_{8}H_{7}NO
Molar mass	133.15 g/mol

Related compounds
Related compounds	Indole, 5-Hydroxyindoline, Serotonin
- Except where otherwise noted, data are given for materials in their standard state (at 25 °C [77 °F], 100 kPa). Infobox references

5-Hydroxyindole (5-indolol or NSC 87503) is an indole alkaloid mood enhancer. It is a positive allosteric modulator of the serotonin 5-HT_{3} receptor.
