= B Reactor =

First industrial-scale nuclear reactor

- U.S. National Register of Historic Places
- U.S. National Historic Landmark
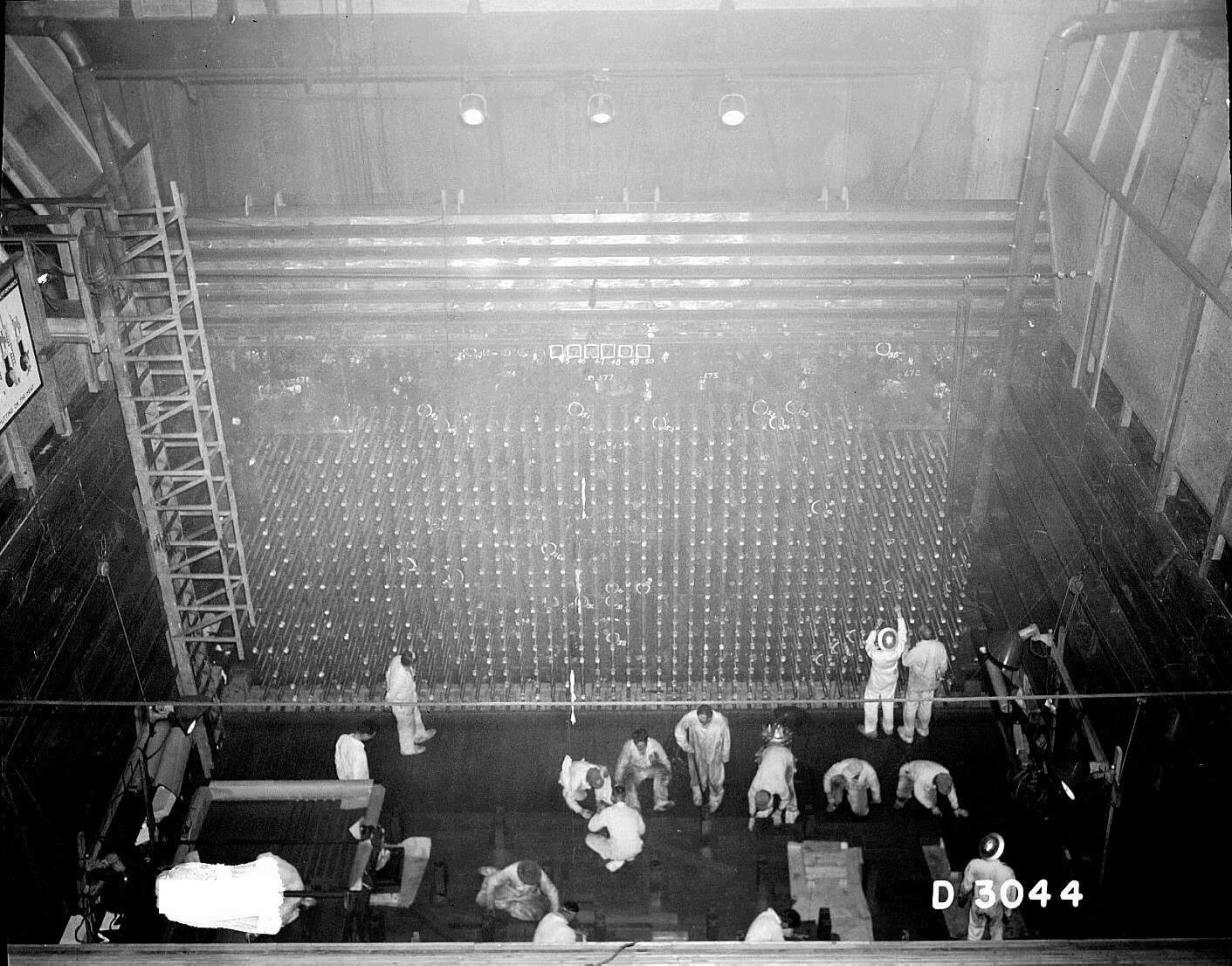
- The face of B Reactor during construction.

- Location within Washington (state) Location within the United States
- Location: About 5.3 miles (8.5 km) northeast of junction of State Route 24 and State Route 240 on the Hanford Site
- Nearest city: Richland, Washington
- Coordinates: 46°37′49″N 119°38′50″W
- Area: 9.5 acres (3.8 ha)
- Built: 7 June 1943 to September 1944
- Architect: E.I. DuPont de Nemours & Company
- NRHP reference No.: 92000245

Significant dates
- Added to NRHP: 3 April 1992
- Designated NHL: 19 August 2008

The B Reactor at the Hanford Site, near Richland, Washington, was the first large-scale nuclear reactor ever built, at 250 MW. It achieved criticality on September 26, 1944. This reactor was of vital importance to the Manhattan Project, the United States nuclear weapons development program during World War II. Its purpose was to convert part of its natural uranium fuel into plutonium-239 by neutron activation, for use in nuclear weapons. Pure plutonium was then chemically separated at the site's T Plant, as an alternative to the Project's uranium enrichment plants in Tennessee. The B reactor was graphite moderated and water-cooled, via a contaminating open cycle with the Columbia River.

It was preceded by Clinton Laboratory's X-10 Graphite Reactor, a pilot plant for reactor production and chemical separation of plutonium, which by mid-1944 had reached a capacity of 4 MW. The B reactor thus represented a massive leap of two orders of magnitude in reactor design. Primarily constructed by DuPont, the operation was assisted by scientists including Enrico Fermi, John Archibald Wheeler, and Chien-Shiung Wu. Two identical reactors, the D Reactor and F Reactor, were launched in December 1944 and February 1945. The plutonium from the site was used in the Trinity test, the Fat Man bomb detonated above Nagasaki, the demon core, and thousands of US warheads during the Cold War. By the early 1960s, the reactors had been upgraded to capacities of 2000 MW. It is historically significant as the world's first large-scale reactor, the first to use water cooling, the first to experience xenon poisoning, the first employed for thermonuclear weapon tritium production, and the seventh critical assembly in total.

The reactor was permanently shut down in February 1968. It has been designated a U.S. National Historic Landmark since 19 August 2008 and in July 2011 the National Park Service recommended that the B Reactor be included in the Manhattan Project National Historical Park commemorating the Manhattan Project. Visitors can take a tour of the reactor by advance reservation.

== Design and construction ==
The reactor was designed and built by E. I. du Pont de Nemours and Company based on experimental designs tested by Enrico Fermi at the University of Chicago, and tests from the X-10 Graphite Reactor at Oak Ridge National Laboratory. It was designed to operate at 250 megawatts (thermal).

The purpose of the reactor was to breed plutonium from natural uranium metal. Enriching fissionable ^{235}U from ^{238}U, the dominant natural isotope, was extremely complex; plutonium's distinct chemistry made separation trivial by comparison. For example, the Y12 uranium enrichment plant in Tennessee required 14,700 tons of silver loaned by the Treasury Department for the windings in its calutrons, employed 22,000 people and consumed more electrical power than most states. Reactor B on the other hand needed only a few dozen employees and far fewer exotic materials required in much smaller quantities. The most important special material needed were the 1,200 tons of purified graphite for neutron moderation, and only enough electricity to run the cooling pumps.

The reactor has a footprint of 46 by 38 ft (14 by 12 m) (about 1,750 sq ft (163 m^{2}) and is 41 ft (12 m) tall, giving a volume of 71,500 cu ft (2,020 m^{3}). The reactor core itself consists of a 36 ft-tall (11 m) graphite box measuring 28 by 36 ft (8.5 by 11.0 m) occupying a volume of 36,288 cu ft (1,027.6 m^{3}) and weighing 1,200 short tons (1,100 t). It is penetrated horizontally through its entire length by 2,004 aluminum tubes containing fuel and vertically by channels housing the control rods.

The core is surrounded by a thermal shield of cast iron 8 to 10 in (20 to 25 cm) thick weighing 1,000 short tons (910 t). Masonite and steel plates enclose the thermal shield on its top and sides, forming a biological shield for radiation protection. The bottom of the thermal shield was supported by a 23 ft-thick (7.0 m) concrete pad topped by cast-iron blocks. Based on the success of the first atomic pile, graphite was selected to moderate the nuclear reaction. This reaction was fueled by 200 short tons (180 t) of metallic uranium slugs approximately 25 mm (1 in) diameter, 70 mm (3 in) long (about as large as of a roll of quarters), sealed in aluminum cans, and loaded into the aluminum tubes.

The reactor was water-cooled. Its coolant was pumped from the Hanford Reach of the Columbia River, through the aluminum tubes and around the uranium slugs at a rate of 75,000 US gal (280,000 L) per minute. The water was discharged into settling basins. Water was held in the basins to permit the decay of short-lived radioactive waste, the settling out of particulate matter gathered from the reactor, and for the water to cool to within 11 °F of the river's temperature. It was then discharged back into the Columbia River.

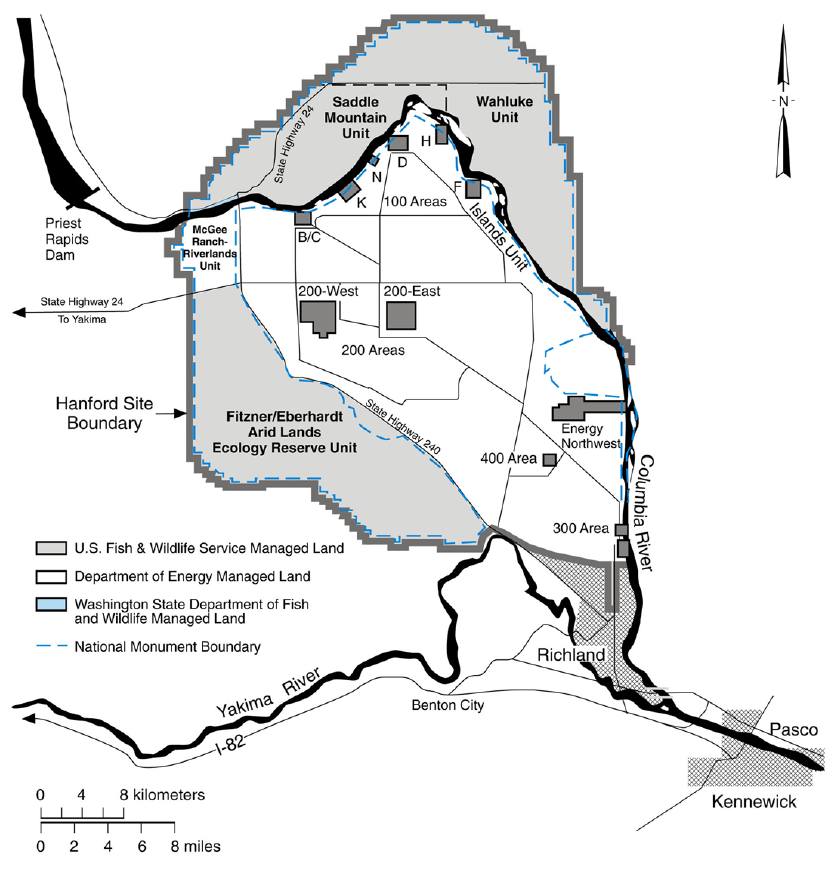
Map of the Hanford site with the B/C reactor site shown at the upper left.

== Operation ==
The B Reactor had its first nuclear chain reaction in September 1944, the D Reactor in December 1944 and the F Reactor in February 1945. The initial operation was halted by a problem identified as neutron absorption by the fission product Xenon-135, first identified in a research paper of Chien-Shiung Wu that was shared with Fermi. It was overcome by increasing the amount of uranium charged. The reactor produced plutonium-239 by irradiating uranium-238 with neutrons generated by the nuclear reaction. It was one of three reactors – along with the D and F reactors – built about six miles (10 km) apart on the south bank of the Columbia River. Each reactor had its own auxiliary facilities that included a river pump house, large storage and settling basins, a filtration plant, large motor-driven pumps for delivering water to the face of the pile, and facilities for emergency cooling in case of a power failure.

Emergency shutdown of the reactor, referred to as a SCRAM, was attained either by rapidly fully inserting the vertical safety rods or, as a backup method, by the injection of borated water into the reactor. In January 1952, the borated water system was replaced by a "Ball-3X" system that injected nickel-plated high-boron steel balls into the channels occupied by the vertical safety rods.

The plutonium for the nuclear bomb used in the Trinity test in New Mexico and the Fat Man bomb dropped on Nagasaki, Japan was created in the B reactor. The B Reactor ran for two decades, and was joined by additional reactors constructed later. It was permanently shut down in February 1968.

== Current status ==
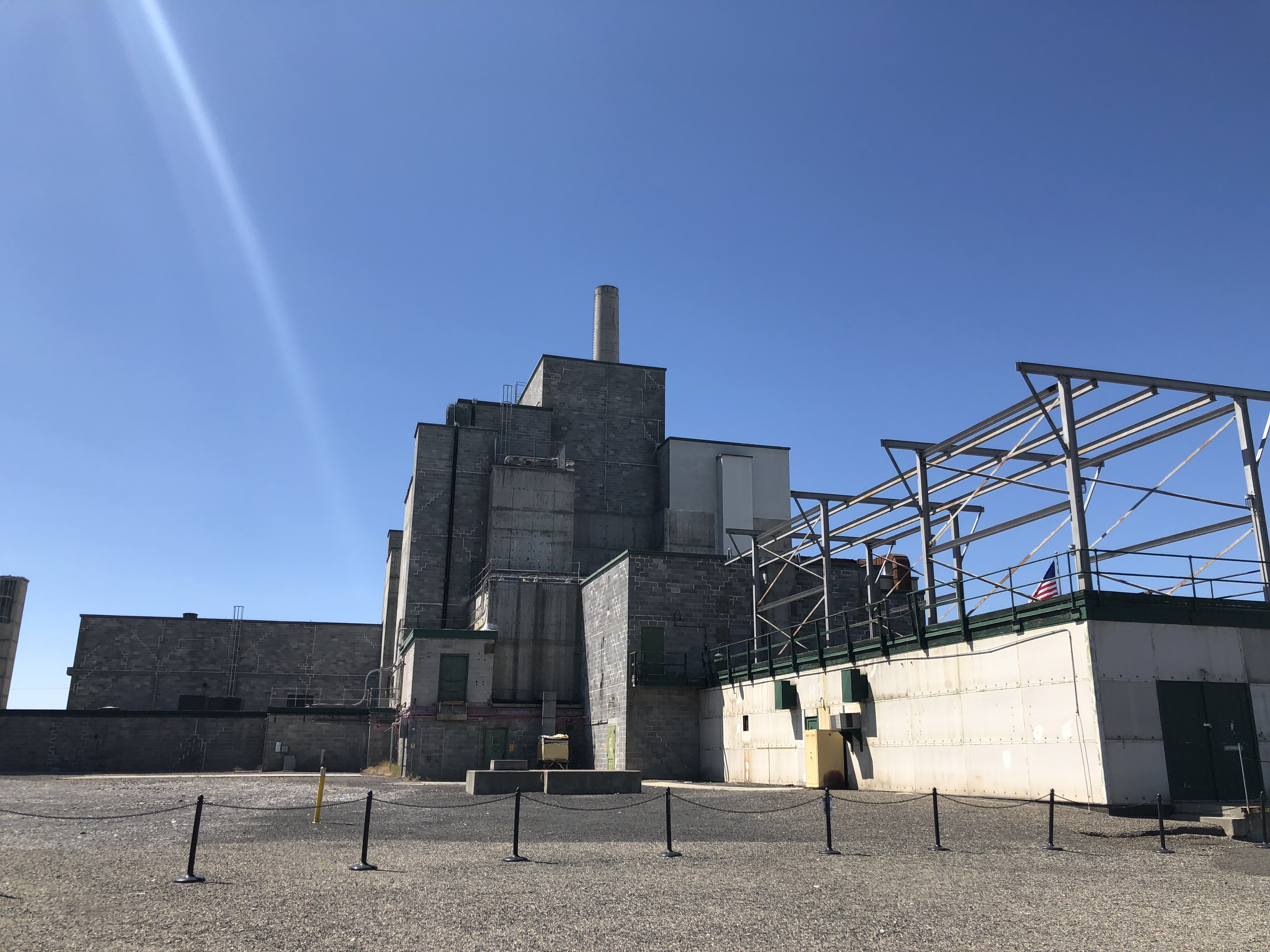
Exterior of the Hanford B Reactor as of 2018

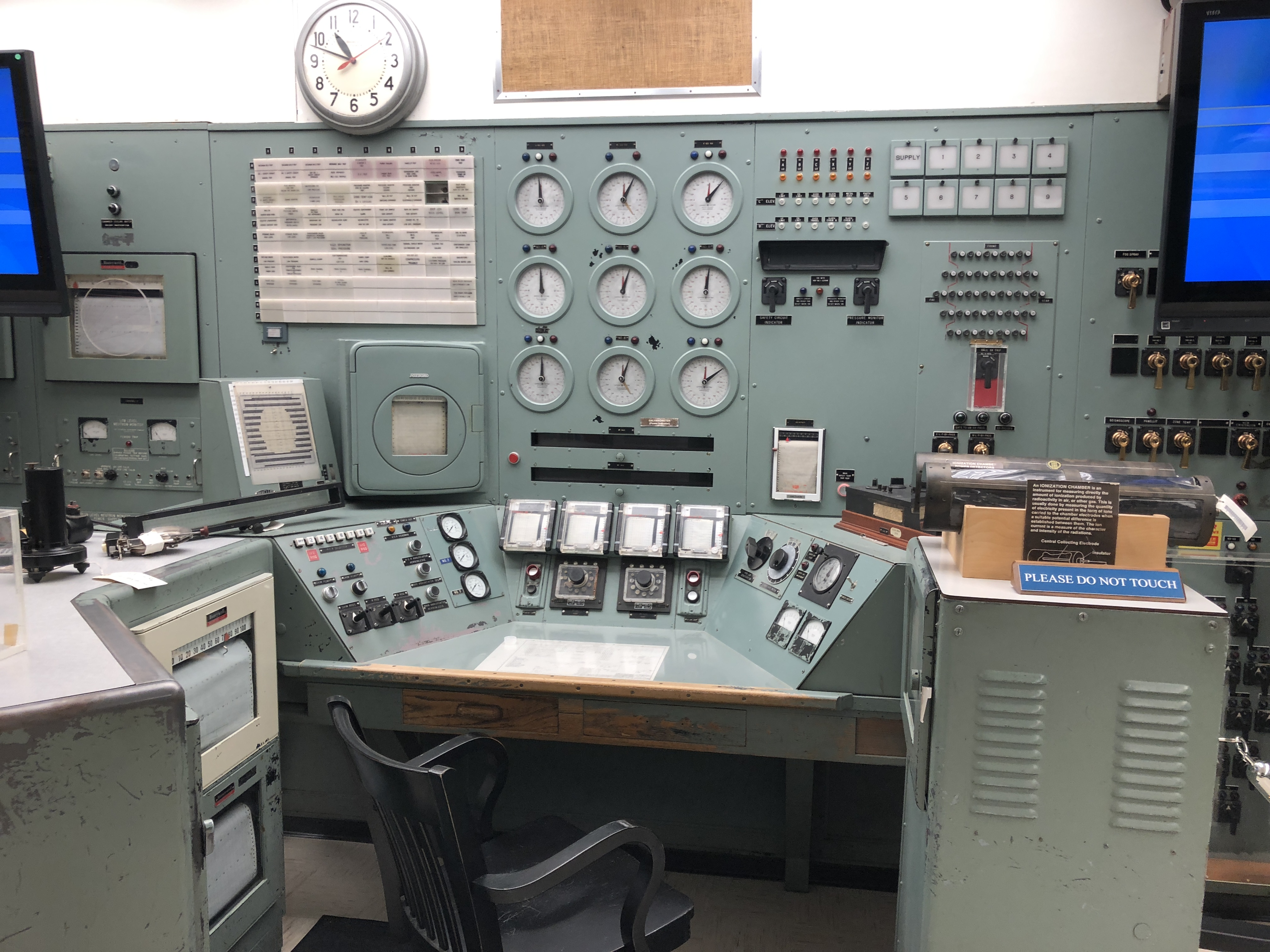
Hanford B Reactor Control Station as of 2018

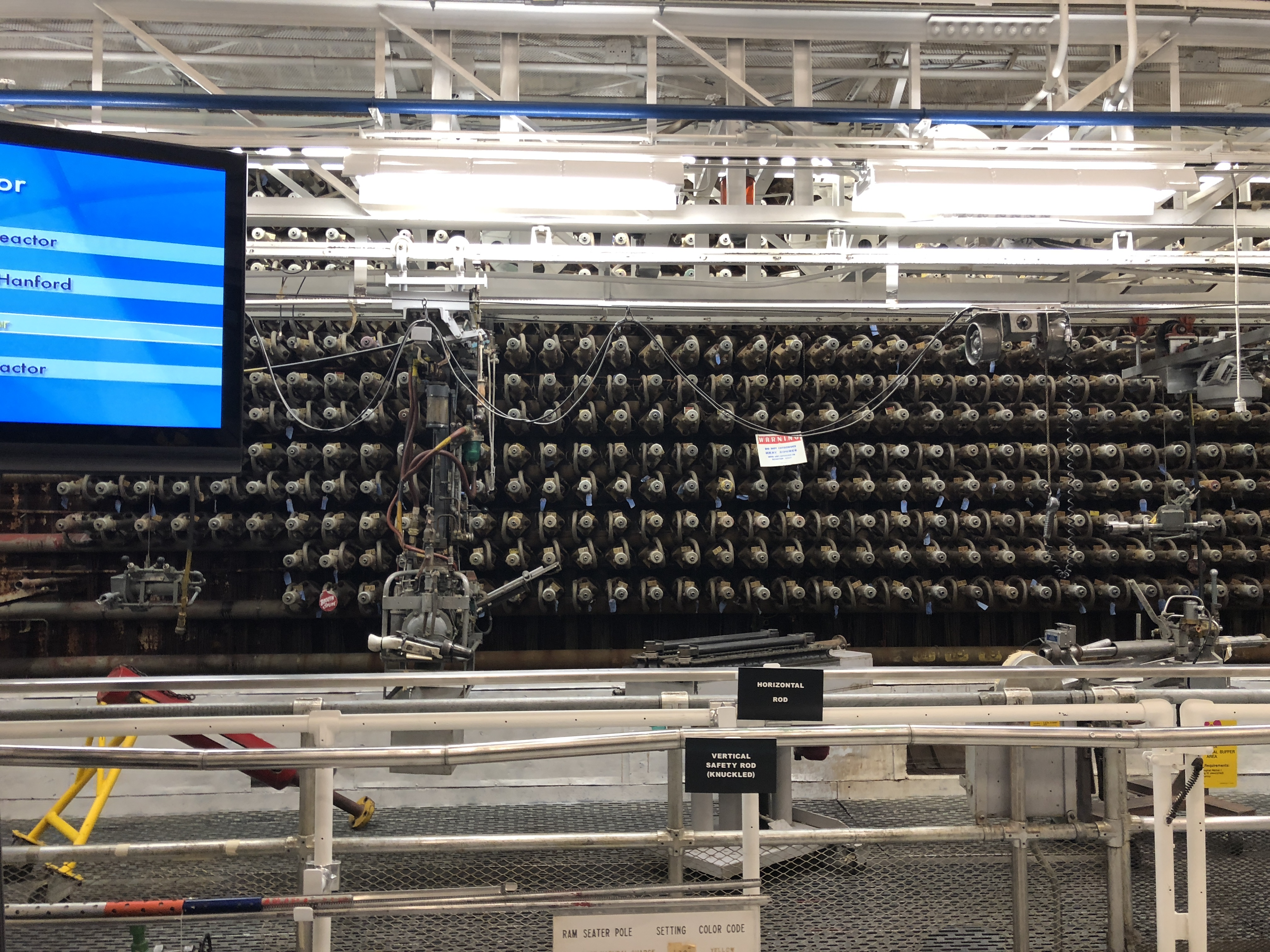
Hanford B Reactor Tubes and Elevator as of 2018

The United States Department of Energy has administered the site since 1977 and offers public tours on set dates during the spring, summer, and fall of the year, as well as special tours for visiting officials.

As of 2014 six of the nine production reactors at Hanford were considered to be in "interim safe storage" status, and two more were to receive similar treatment. The exception was the B Reactor, which was given special status for its historical significance.

In a process called cocooning or entombment, the reactor buildings are demolished up to the 4 ft-thick (1.2 m) concrete shield around the reactor core. Any openings are sealed and a new roof is built. Most auxiliary buildings at the first three reactors have been demolished, as well. The C reactor was put into operation in 1952 and was shut down in 1969. It was cocooned as of 1998. The D reactor operated from 1944 to June 1967, and was cocooned in 2004. The DR Reactor went online in October 1950, and was shut down in 1964. It was cocooned in 2002. The F reactor was shut down in June 1965 and cocooned in 2003. The H Reactor became operational as of October 1949 and was shut down as of April 1965. It was cocooned as of 2005. Cocooning of the N-Reactor, which operated from 1963 to 1987, was completed as of 14 June 2012. The decommissioned reactors are inspected every five years by the Department of Energy.

The K East and K West reactors were built in the 1950s and went into use in 1955. They were shut down in 1970 and 1971, but reused temporarily for storage later. Preliminary plans for interim stabilizing of the K-East and K-West reactors were underway as of 30 January 2018.

The B Reactor was added to the National Register of Historic Places (#92000245) on 3 April 1992. A Record of Decision (ROD) was issued in 1999, and an EPA Action Memorandum in 2001 authorized hazards mitigation in the reactor with the intention of allowing public tours of the reactor. It was named a National Historic Landmark on 19 August 2008.

In December 2014, passage of the 2015 National Defense Authorization Act (NDAA) made the B reactor part of the Manhattan Project National Historical Park, which also includes historic sites at Oak Ridge, Tennessee and Los Alamos, New Mexico. The park was formally established by a Memorandum of Agreement on November 10, 2015, which was signed by the National Park Service and the Department of Energy. Museum development at Hanford may include the B Reactor, Bruggemann's Warehouse, Hanford High School, Pump House, and White Bluffs Bank.

== Timeline of major events ==
Year	Date	Event
1943	October	U.S. Army Corps of Engineers breaks ground to build B Reactor
1944	13 September	First uranium fuel slug loaded into B Reactor
1944	26 September	Initial reactor criticality achieved
1945	3 February	B Reactor plutonium delivered to Los Alamos
1945	16 July	B Reactor plutonium used in world's first nuclear explosion. (Trinity Test Site, New Mexico)
1945	9 August	B Reactor plutonium used in Fat Man bomb dropped on Nagasaki, Japan
1946	March	B Reactor operations suspended
1948	June	B Reactor operation resumed
1949	March	B Reactor begins production of tritium for use in hydrogen bombs
1954	1 March	First use of B Reactor tritium in a test detonation of a hydrogen bomb at Bikini Atoll
1968	January 29	Atomic Energy Commission directs shutdown of B Reactor
1976		B Reactor declared National Historic Mechanical Engineering Landmark by American Society of Mechanical Engineers
1994		B Reactor declared National Historic Civil Engineering Landmark by American Society of Civil Engineers
2008		B Reactor declared National Historic Landmark by U.S. Department of Interior and National Park Service
2009		U.S. Department of Energy announces public tours
2011	July	National Park Service recommends B Reactor be included in a national historic park commemorating the Manhattan Project.
2014	December	2015 National Defense Authorization Act (NDAA) includes B reactor in Manhattan Project National Historical Park
2015	10 November	Manhattan Project National Historical Park formally established by Memorandum of Agreement

== See also ==
- List of National Historic Landmarks in Washington
- National Register of Historic Places listings in Benton County, Washington
