= Xenon-135 =

Isotope of xenon

General
- Symbol: ^{135}Xe
- Names: xenon-135
- Protons (Z): 54
- Neutrons (N): 81

Nuclide data
- Natural abundance: 0 (synthetic)
- Half-life (t_{1/2}): 9.14±0.02 h
- Spin: 3/2+
- Excess energy: −86413±4 keV
- Nuclear binding energy: 8398.476±0.028 keV
- Decay products: ^{135}Cs

Decay modes
- Decay mode: Decay energy (MeV)
- Beta decay: 1.165

Xenon-135 (^{135}Xe) is an unstable isotope of xenon with a half-life of 9.14 hours, decaying to long-lived caesium-135.

^{135}Xe is a fission product and it is the most powerful known neutron-absorbing nuclear poison (2 million barns; up to 3 million barns under reactor conditions), with a significant effect on nuclear reactor operation. The yield of xenon-135 from fission is about 6.6% (uranium) or 7.4% (plutonium), the great majority from iodine-135. It is normal for fission products to be formed in such a chain of decays.

== ^{135}Xe effects on reactor restart ==
Graph showing the concentration of Xenon and the reactivity of the nuclear reaction from the moment the reactor is shut down.

In a typical nuclear reactor fueled with uranium-235, the presence of ^{135}Xe as a fission product presents designers and operators with problems due to its large neutron cross section for absorption. Because absorbing neutrons can impair a nuclear reactor's ability to increase power, reactors are designed to mitigate this effect and operators are trained to anticipate and react to these transients. This practice dates to the first fission piles, constructed by the Manhattan Project during the Second World War. Enrico Fermi suspected that ^{135}Xe would act as a powerful neutron poison and followed the advice of Emilio Segrè by contacting his student Chien-Shiung Wu. Wu's unpublished paper on ^{135}Xe verified Fermi's guess that it absorbed neutrons and was the cause of the disruptions to the B Reactor then in use at Hanford, Washington to breed plutonium for the American implosion bomb.

During periods of steady state operation at a constant neutron flux level, the ^{135}Xe concentration builds up to its equilibrium value for that reactor power in about 40 to 50 hours. When the reactor power is increased, ^{135}Xe concentration initially decreases because the burn up is increased at the new higher power level. Because 95% of the ^{135}Xe production is from decay of ^{135}I, which has a 6.58 hour half-life, the production of ^{135}Xe remains constant; at this point, the ^{135}Xe concentration reaches a minimum. The concentration then increases to the new equilibrium level (more accurately steady state level) for the new power level in roughly 40 to 50 hours. During the initial 4 to 6 hours following the power change, the magnitude and the rate of change of concentration is dependent upon the initial power level and on the amount of change in power level; the ^{135}Xe concentration change is greater for a larger change in power level. When reactor power is decreased, the process is reversed.

Iodine-135 is a fission product of uranium with a yield of about 6% (counting also the ^{135}I produced almost immediately from decay of fission-produced tellurium-135). This ^{135}I decays with a 6.58 hour half-life to ^{135}Xe. Thus, in an operating nuclear reactor, ^{135}Xe is being continuously produced. ^{135}Xe has a very large neutron absorption cross-section, so in the high-neutron-flux environment of a nuclear reactor core, the ^{135}Xe soon absorbs a neutron and becomes effectively stable ^{136}Xe. (The half-life of ^{136}Xe is >10^{21} years, and it is not treated as a radioisotope.) Thus, in about 50 hours, the ^{135}Xe concentration reaches equilibrium where its creation by ^{135}I decay is balanced with its destruction by neutron absorption.

When reactor power is decreased or shut down by inserting neutron-absorbing control rods, the reactor neutron flux is reduced and the equilibrium shifts initially towards higher ^{135}Xe concentration. The ^{135}Xe concentration peaks about 11 hours after reactor power is decreased. Since ^{135}Xe has a 9.14 hour half-life, the ^{135}Xe concentration gradually decays back to low levels over 72 hours.

The temporarily high level of ^{135}Xe with its high neutron absorption cross-section makes it difficult to restart the reactor for several hours. The neutron-absorbing ^{135}Xe acts like a control rod, reducing reactivity. The inability of a reactor to be started due to the effects of ^{135}Xe is sometimes referred to as xenon-precluded start-up, and the reactor is said to be "poisoned out". The period of time that the reactor is unable to overcome the effects of ^{135}Xe is called the "xenon dead time".

If sufficient reactivity control authority is available, the reactor can be restarted, but the xenon burn-out transient must be carefully managed. As the control rods are extracted and criticality is reached, neutron flux increases many orders of magnitude and the ^{135}Xe begins to absorb neutrons and be transmuted to ^{136}Xe. The reactor burns off the nuclear poison. As this happens, the reactivity and neutron flux increases, and the control rods must be gradually reinserted to counter the loss of neutron absorption by the ^{135}Xe. Otherwise, the reactor neutron flux will continue to increase, burning off even more xenon poison, on a path to runaway criticality. The time constant for this burn-off transient depends on the reactor design, power level history of the reactor for the past several days, and the new power setting. For a typical step up from 50% power to 100% power, ^{135}Xe concentration falls for roughly 4 to 6 hours.

Xenon poisoning was a contributing factor to the Chernobyl disaster; during a run-down to a lower power, a combination of operator error and xenon poisoning caused the reactor thermal power to fall to near-shutdown levels. The crew's resulting efforts to restore power placed the reactor in a highly unsafe configuration. A flaw in the SCRAM system inserted positive reactivity, causing a thermal transient and a steam explosion that tore the reactor apart.

Reactors using continuous reprocessing like many molten salt reactor designs might be able to extract ^{135}Xe from the fuel and avoid these effects. Fluid fuel reactors cannot develop xenon inhomogeneity because the fuel is free to mix. Also, the Molten Salt Reactor Experiment demonstrated that spraying the liquid fuel as droplets through a gas space during recirculation can allow xenon and krypton to leave the fuel salts. Removing ^{135}Xe from neutron exposure improves neutron economy, but causes the reactor to produce more of the long-lived fission product ^{135}Cs. The long lived (but 76000 times less radioactive) caesium-135 condenses in a separate tank after the decay of ^{135}Xe, and is physically separate from the 30.05-year-half-life caesium-137 (^{137}Cs) produced in the fuel, and it is practical to handle them separately (fission yield is approximately 6% for both).

== Decay and capture products ==
A ^{135}Xe atom that does not capture a neutron undergoes beta decay to ^{135}Cs, one of the 7 long-lived fission products, while a ^{135}Xe that does capture a neutron becomes almost-stable ^{136}Xe.

The probability of capturing a neutron before decay varies with the neutron flux, which itself depends on the kind of reactor, fuel enrichment and power level; and the ^{135}Cs / ^{136}Xe ratio switches its predominant branch very near usual reactor conditions. Estimates of the proportion of ^{135}Xe during steady-state reactor operation that captures a neutron include 90%, 39%–91% and "essentially all". For instance, in a (somewhat high) neutron flux of 10^{14} n·cm^{−2}·s^{−1}, the xenon cross section of σ = 2.65×10^{−18} cm^{2} (2.65×10^{6} barn) would lead to a capture probability of 2.65×10^{−4} s^{−1}, which corresponds to a half-life of about one hour. Compared to the 9.14 hour half-life of ^{135}Xe, this nearly ten-to-one ratio means that under such conditions, essentially all ^{135}Xe would capture a neutron before decay. But if the neutron flux is lowered to one-tenth of this value, like in CANDU reactors, the ratio would be 50-50, and half the ^{135}Xe would decay to ^{135}Cs before neutron capture.

^{136}Xe from neutron capture ends up as part of the eventual stable fission xenon which also includes ^{134}Xe, ^{132}Xe, and ^{131}Xe produced by fission and beta decay rather than neutron capture.

Nuclei of ^{133}Xe, ^{137}Xe, and ^{135}Xe that have not captured a neutron all beta decay to isotopes of caesium. Fission produces ^{133}Xe, ^{137}Xe, and ^{135}Xe in roughly equal amounts but, after neutron capture, fission caesium contains more stable ^{133}Cs (which however can become ^{134}Cs on further neutron activation) and highly radioactive ^{137}Cs than ^{135}Cs.

== Spatial xenon oscillations ==
Large thermal reactors with low flux coupling between regions may experience spatial power oscillations because of the non-uniform presence of xenon-135. Xenon-induced spatial power oscillations occur as a result of rapid perturbations to power distribution that cause the xenon and iodine distribution to be out of phase with the perturbed power distribution. This results in a shift in xenon and iodine distributions that causes the power distribution to change in an opposite direction from the initial perturbation.

The instantaneous production rate of xenon-135 is dependent on the iodine-135 concentration and therefore on the local neutron flux history. On the other hand, the destruction rate of xenon-135 is dependent on the instantaneous local neutron flux.

The combination of delayed generation and high neutron-capture cross section produces a diversity of impacts on nuclear reactor operation. The mechanism is described in the following four steps.

1. An initial lack of symmetry (for example, axial symmetry, in the case of axial oscillations) in the core power distribution (for example as a result of significant control rods movement) causes an imbalance in fission rates within the reactor core, and therefore, in the iodine-135 buildup and the xenon-135 absorption.
2. In the high-flux region, xenon-135 burnout allows the flux to increase further, while in the low-flux region, the increase in xenon-135 causes a further reduction in flux. The iodine concentration increases where the flux is high and decreases where the flux is low. This shift in the xenon distribution is such as to increase (decrease) the multiplication properties of the region in which the flux has increased (decreased), thus enhancing the flux tilt.
3. As soon as the iodine-135 levels build up sufficiently, decay to xenon reverses the initial situation. Flux decreases in this area, and the former low-flux region increases in power.
4. Repetition of these patterns can lead to xenon oscillations moving about the core with periods on the order of about 24 hours.

With little change in overall power level, these oscillations can significantly change the local power levels. This oscillation may go unnoticed and reach dangerous local flux levels if only the total power of the core is monitored. Therefore, most PWRs use tandem power range excore neutron detectors to monitor upper and lower halves of the core separately.

== See also ==
- Isotopes of xenon
- Shutdown (nuclear reactor)
