= Neutron poison =

Substance that can absorb large quantities of neutrons in a reactor core

In applications such as nuclear reactors, a neutron poison (also called a neutron absorber or a nuclear poison) is a substance with a large neutron absorption cross-section. In such applications, absorbing neutrons is normally an undesirable effect. However, neutron-absorbing materials, also called poisons, are intentionally inserted into some types of reactors in order to lower the high reactivity of their initial fresh fuel load. Some of these poisons deplete as they absorb neutrons during reactor operation, while others remain relatively constant.

The accumulation of fission products that absorb neutrons is called fission-product poisoning, also known as reactor poisoning; in thermal reactors (the most common type of commercial reactor) the two most important poisons are ^{135}Xe and ^{149}Sm.

== Transient fission product poisons ==
Some of the fission products generated during nuclear reactions have a high neutron absorption capacity, such as xenon-135 (microscopic cross-section σ = 2,000,000 barns (b); up to 3 million barns in reactor conditions) and samarium-149 (σ = 74,500 b). Because these two fission product poisons remove neutrons from the reactor, they will affect the thermal utilization factor and thus the reactivity. The poisoning of a reactor core by these fission products may become so serious that the chain reaction comes to a standstill.

Xenon-135 in particular tremendously affects the operation of a nuclear reactor because it is the most powerful known neutron poison. The inability of a reactor to be restarted due to the buildup of xenon-135 (reaches a maximum after about 10 hours) is sometimes referred to as xenon precluded start-up. The period of time in which the reactor is unable to override the effects of xenon-135 is called the xenon dead time or poison outage. During periods of steady state operation, at a constant neutron flux level, the xenon-135 concentration builds up to its equilibrium value for that reactor power in about 40 to 50 hours. When the reactor power is increased, xenon-135 concentration initially decreases because the burn up is increased at the new, higher power level. Thus, the dynamics of xenon poisoning are important for the stability of the flux pattern and geometrical power distribution, especially in physically large reactors.

Because 95% of the xenon-135 production is from iodine-135 decay, which has a 6- to 7-hour half-life, the production of xenon-135 remains constant; at this point, the xenon-135 concentration reaches a minimum. The concentration then increases to the equilibrium for the new power level in the same time, roughly 40 to 50 hours. The magnitude and the rate of change of concentration during the initial 4 to 6 hour period following the power change is dependent upon the initial power level and on the amount of change in power level; the xenon-135 concentration change is greater for a larger change in power level. When reactor power is decreased, the process is reversed.

Because samarium-149 is not radioactive and is not removed by decay, it presents problems somewhat different from those encountered with xenon-135. The equilibrium concentration (and thus the poisoning effect) builds to an equilibrium value during reactor operation in about 500 hours (about three weeks), and since samarium-149 is stable, the concentration remains essentially constant during reactor operation. Another problematic isotope that builds up is gadolinium-157, with microscopic cross-section of σ = 200,000 b.

== Accumulating fission product poisons ==
There are numerous other fission products that, as a result of their concentration and thermal neutron absorption cross section, have a poisoning effect on reactor operation. Individually, they are of little consequence, but taken together they have a significant effect. These are often characterized as lumped fission product poisons and accumulate at an average rate of 50 barns per fission event in the reactor. The buildup of fission product poisons in the fuel eventually leads to loss of efficiency, and in some cases to instability. In practice, buildup of reactor poisons in nuclear fuel is what determines the lifetime of nuclear fuel in a reactor: long before all possible fissions have taken place, buildup of long-lived neutron-absorbing fission products damps out the chain reaction. This is the reason that nuclear reprocessing is a useful activity: solid spent nuclear fuel contains about 97% of the original fissionable material present in newly manufactured nuclear fuel. Chemical separation of the fission products restores the fuel so that it can be used again.

Other potential approaches to fission product removal include solid but porous fuel which allows escape of fission products and liquid or gaseous fuel (molten salt reactor, aqueous homogeneous reactor). These ease the problem of fission product accumulation in the fuel, but pose the additional problem of safely removing and storing the fission products. Some fission products are themselves stable or quickly decay to stable nuclides. Of the (roughly half a dozen each) medium lived and long-lived fission products, some, like ^{99}Tc, are proposed for nuclear transmutation precisely because of their non-negligible capture cross section.

Other fission products with relatively high absorption cross sections include ^{83}Kr, ^{95}Mo, ^{143}Nd, ^{147}Pm. Above this mass, even many even-mass number isotopes have large absorption cross sections, allowing one nucleus to serially absorb multiple neutrons. Fission of heavier actinides produces more of the heavier fission products in the lanthanide range, so the total neutron absorption cross section of fission products is higher.

In a fast reactor the fission product poison situation may differ significantly because neutron absorption cross sections can differ for thermal neutrons and fast neutrons. In the RBEC-M Lead-Bismuth Cooled Fast Reactor, the fission products with neutron capture more than 5% of total fission products capture are, in order, ^{133}Cs, ^{101}Ru, ^{103}Rh, ^{99}Tc, ^{105}Pd and ^{107}Pd in the core, with ^{149}Sm replacing ^{107}Pd for 6th place in the breeding blanket.

== Decay poisons ==
In addition to fission product poisons, other materials in the reactor decay to materials that act as neutron poisons. An example of this is the decay of tritium to helium-3. Since tritium has a half-life of 12.3 years, normally this decay does not significantly affect reactor operations because the rate of decay of tritium is so slow. However, if tritium is produced in a reactor and then allowed to remain in the reactor during a prolonged shutdown of several months, a sufficient amount of tritium may decay to helium-3 to add a significant amount of negative reactivity. Any helium-3 produced in the reactor during a shutdown period will be removed during subsequent operation by a neutron-proton reaction, as helium-3 has a high absorption cross section for thermal neutrons, producing tritium and hydrogen again. Pressurized heavy water reactors will produce small but notable amounts of tritium through neutron capture in the heavy water moderator, which will likewise decay to helium-3. Given the high market value of both tritium and helium-3, tritium is periodically removed from the moderator/coolant of some CANDU reactors and sold at a profit. Water boration (the addition of boric acid to the moderator/coolant), which is commonly employed in pressurized light water reactors, also produces non-negligible amounts of tritium via the successive reactions ^{10}_{5}B(n, α)^{7}_{3}Li and ^{7}_{3}Li(n,α n)^{3}_{1}T or (in the presence of fast neutrons) ^{7}_{3}Li(n,2n)^{6}_{3}Li and subsequently ^{6}_{3}Li(n,α)^{3}_{1}T. Fast neutrons also produce tritium directly from boron via ^{10}_{5}B(n,2α)^{3}_{1}T. All nuclear fission reactors produce a certain quantity of tritium via ternary fission.

== Control poisons ==
Schematic drawing of control rods in a nuclear reactor. With the control rods down, the reaction is subcritical: too many neutrons are absorbed for a chain reaction to take place. Pulling up the rods makes the reactor critical, and the fuel rods start producing heat.

During operation of a reactor, the amount of fuel contained in the core decreases monotonically. If the reactor is to operate for a long period of time, fuel in excess of that needed for exact criticality must be added when the reactor is fueled. The positive reactivity due to the excess fuel must be balanced with negative reactivity from neutron-absorbing material. Movable control rods containing neutron-absorbing material is one method, but control rods alone to balance the excess reactivity may be impractical for a particular core design as there may be insufficient room for the rods or their mechanisms, namely in submarines, where space is particularly at a premium.

=== Burnable poisons ===
To control large amounts of excess fuel reactivity without control rods, burnable poisons are loaded into the core. Burnable poisons are materials that have a high neutron absorption cross section that are converted into materials of relatively low absorption cross section as the result of neutron absorption. Due to the burn-up of the poison material, the negative reactivity of the burnable poison decreases over core life. Ideally, these poisons should decrease their negative reactivity at the same rate that the fuel's excess positive reactivity is depleted.

Fixed burnable poisons are generally used in the form of compounds of boron or gadolinium that are shaped into separate lattice pins or plates, or introduced as additives to the fuel. Since they can usually be distributed more uniformly than control rods, these poisons are less disruptive to the core's power distribution. Fixed burnable poisons may also be discretely loaded in specific locations in the core in order to shape or control flux profiles to prevent excessive flux and power peaking near certain regions of the reactor. Current practice however is to use fixed non-burnable poisons in this service.

=== Non-burnable poison ===
A non-burnable poison is one that maintains a constant negative reactivity worth over the life of the core. While no neutron poison is strictly non-burnable, certain materials can be treated as non-burnable poisons under certain conditions. One example is hafnium. It has five stable isotopes, ^{176}Hf through ^{180}Hf, which can all absorb neutrons, so the first four are chemically unchanged by absorbing neutrons. (A final absorption produces ^{181}Hf, which beta-decays to ^{181}Ta.) This absorption chain results in a long-lived burnable poison which approximates non-burnable characteristics.

=== Soluble poisons ===
Soluble poisons, also called chemical shim, produce a spatially uniform neutron absorption when dissolved in the water coolant. The most common soluble poison in commercial pressurized water reactors (PWR) is boric acid, which is often referred to as soluble boron. The boric acid in the coolant decreases the thermal utilization factor, causing a decrease in reactivity. By varying the concentration of boric acid in the coolant, a process referred to as boration and dilution, the reactivity of the core can be easily varied. If the boron concentration is increased (boration), the coolant/moderator absorbs more neutrons, adding negative reactivity. If the boron concentration is reduced (dilution), positive reactivity is added. The changing of boron concentration in a PWR is a slow process and is used primarily to compensate for fuel burnout or poison buildup.

The variation in boron concentration allows control rod use to be minimized, which results in a flatter flux profile over the core than can be produced by rod insertion. The flatter flux profile occurs because there are no regions of depressed flux like those that would be produced in the vicinity of inserted control rods. This system is not in widespread use because the chemicals make the moderator temperature reactivity coefficient less negative. All commercial PWR types operating in the US (Westinghouse, Combustion Engineering, and Babcock & Wilcox) employ soluble boron to control excess reactivity. US Navy reactors and Boiling Water Reactors do not. One known issue of boric acid is that it increases corrosion risks, as illustrated in a 2002 incident at Davis-Besse Nuclear Power Station.

Soluble poisons are also used in emergency shutdown systems. During SCRAM the operators can inject solutions containing neutron poisons directly into the reactor coolant. Various aqueous solutions, including borax, sodium polyborate, and gadolinium nitrate, are used.

== Bibliography ==
- DOE Fundamentals Handbook: Nuclear Physics and Reactor Theory, Vol. 2 (PDF). U.S. Department of Energy. January 1993. Archived from the original (PDF) on 3 December 2013.
