= Neutron flux =

Total distance traveled by neutrons within a volume over a time period

The neutron flux is a scalar quantity used in nuclear physics and nuclear reactor physics. It is the total distance travelled by all free neutrons per unit time and volume. Equivalently, it can be defined as the number of neutrons travelling through a small sphere of radius $R$ in a time interval, divided by a maximal cross section of the sphere (the great disk area, $\pi R^2$) and by the duration of the time interval. The dimension of neutron flux is $\mathsf{L}^{-2}\mathsf{T}^{-1}$ and the usual unit is cm^{−2}s^{−1} (reciprocal square centimetre times reciprocal second). The flux can also be expressed as the product of the neutron density $n$ and the neutron speed $v$ ($\Phi = nv$), so that multiplying it by the macroscopic cross section gives the reaction rate per unit volume.

The neutron fluence is defined as the neutron flux integrated over a certain time period. So its dimension is $\mathsf{L}^{-2}$ and its usual unit is cm^{−2} (reciprocal square centimetre). An older term used instead of cm^{−2} was "n.v.t." (neutrons, velocity, time).

== Energy-dependent flux ==
In a reactor, neutrons are present over a broad range of energies, and the flux is usually written per unit energy interval: $\Phi(E) = n(E) v(E)$, where $n(E)$ is the neutron density per unit energy. The total flux is the integral of $\Phi(E)$ over all energies.

== Neutron current ==
Unlike the heat flux, the neutron flux is a scalar; the net flow of neutrons in a given direction is described by the neutron current density $\mathbf{J}$, a vector whose component along an axis is the net number of neutrons passing per unit time through a unit area perpendicular to that axis. In the diffusion approximation, the current is proportional to the negative spatial gradient of the flux, $\mathbf{J} = -D\nabla\Phi$, where $D$ is the diffusion coefficient; this relation is known as Fick's law, by analogy with the diffusion of a solute in a solution.

== Natural neutron flux ==
Neutron flux in asymptotic giant branch stars and in supernovae is responsible for most of the natural nucleosynthesis producing elements heavier than iron. In stars there is a relatively low neutron flux on the order of 10^{5} to 10^{11} cm^{−2} s^{−1}, resulting in nucleosynthesis by the s-process (slow neutron-capture process). By contrast, after a core-collapse supernova, there is an extremely high neutron flux, on the order of 10^{32} cm^{−2} s^{−1}, resulting in nucleosynthesis by the r-process (rapid neutron-capture process).

Earth atmospheric neutron flux, apparently from thunderstorms, can reach levels of 3·10^{−2} to 9·10^{+1} cm^{−2} s^{−1}. However, recent results (considered invalid by the original investigators) obtained with unshielded scintillation neutron detectors show a decrease in the neutron flux during thunderstorms. Recent research appears to support lightning generating 10^{13}–10^{15} neutrons per discharge via photonuclear processes.

== Artificial neutron flux ==
Artificial neutron flux refers to neutron flux which is man-made, either as byproducts from weapons or nuclear energy production or for a specific application such as from a research reactor or by spallation. A flow of neutrons is often used to initiate the fission of unstable large nuclei. One or more additional neutrons may cause a nucleus to become unstable, causing it to decay (split) to form more stable products. This effect is essential in fission reactors and nuclear weapons.

Within a nuclear fission reactor, the neutron flux is the primary quantity measured to control the reaction inside. The flux shape is the term applied to the density or relative strength of the flux as it moves around the reactor. Typically the strongest neutron flux occurs in the middle of the reactor core, becoming lower toward the edges. In an idealized bare (unreflected) core, the flux distribution is approximately a cosine of the distance from the center for the common core geometries. Because the fission rate per unit volume is proportional to the local flux, the power density is also highest at the center of the core. The power density is the product of the fission rate per unit volume and the recoverable energy released per fission: $q = E_R \Sigma_f \Phi.$ The ratio of the peak flux to the average flux is a standard core design metric: it measures the overall variation of the flux in the core and indicates how much the central power density exceeds the average, and the flux distribution in a real reactor is made as flat as possible. The higher the neutron flux the greater the chance of a nuclear reaction occurring as there are more neutrons going through an area per unit time. Because the excess core reactivity usually available to override the negative reactivity of xenon is less than 10% $\Delta k/k$, thermal power reactors are normally limited to thermal-neutron flux levels of about 5×10^{13} cm^{−2}s^{−1} so that timely restart can be ensured after shutdown.

=== Reactor vessel wall neutron fluence ===
A reactor vessel of a typical nuclear power plant (PWR) endures in 40 years (32 full reactor years) of operation approximately 6.5×10^{19} cm^{−2} (E > 1 MeV) of neutron fluence. Neutron flux causes reactor vessels to suffer from neutron embrittlement and is a major problem with thermonuclear fusion like ITER and other magnetic confinement D-T reactors where fast (originally 14.06 MeV) neutrons damage equipment resulting in short equipment lifetime and huge costs and large volumes of radioactive waste streams.

== See also ==
- Neutron radiation
- Neutron transport
