= John P. Barton =

British-born nuclear scientist

John Penrose Barton (born 1934) is a British and American applied nuclear scientist who helped pioneer Neutron Radiography. Neutron Radiography (a.k.a. Neutron Imaging) is a new way of seeing (imaging) things complementary to Radiography with X-Rays. Particularly notable applications are to Aviation safety such as inspection of jet engine turbine blades.

Barton chaired or co-chaired the first four World Conferences on Neutron Radiography held in San Diego, 1981; Paris, 1986; Osaka, 1989 and San Francisco, 1992.

== Early years ==
Barton was born in London in 1934. He studied Applied Nuclear Physics under Philip Burton Moon and Rudolf Peierls at the University of Birmingham.

From 1957 he worked on the neutron physics of power reactor design at AERE Harwell, where John Cockcroft was head of laboratory. Barton worked at AEE Winfrith from 1959 to 1960.

== Pioneering Neutron Radiography Internationally ==
From 1961 to 1965, while affiliated with the University of Birmingham, Barton's publications included a demonstration of Cold Neutron Radiography using a 5MW reactor at AWE Aldermaston. From 1965, while affiliated with the CEA in Grenoble, Barton's publications included potentials of small source systems and a demonstration of Underwater NR using a Conical Collimator.

From 1967, while affiliated with the Argonne National Laboratory, Barton's publications included demonstrations of isotopic source NR capabilities.

From 1971 to 1978, while affiliated with the Oregon State University Radiation Center, publications included High Speed Motion Neutron Radiography and Neutron Computed Tomography using the TREAT Reactor at Idaho National Laboratory.

From 1979, based in San Diego, Barton's publications included in-house NR system designs and applications to aircraft safety, a precursor of the McClellan Radiation Center, Sacramento.

In 1989, Barton reported on the feasibility of Maneuverable Neutron Radiography System for inspection of intact aircraft at the Sacramento Air Logistics Center. In 1996 at the Fifth World Conference on Neutron Radiography, Barton presented a review with references to over 50 of his publications, and a report on the Foundation of The International Society for Neutron Radiology.

In 2010 Barton was appointed an honorary member of the International Society for Neutron Radiology.
