= ADE-2 =

Dual use graphite-moderated reactor in Russia

- Reactor concept: Graphite-moderated reactor
- Status: Closed in 2010
- Location: Zheleznogorsk, Krasnoyarsk Krai, Russia

Main parameters of the reactor core
- Fuel (fissile material): Uranium
- Neutron energy spectrum: Thermal-neutron reactor
- Primary moderator: Graphite
- Primary coolant: water-cooled

Reactor usage

The ADE-2 is a dual use water-cooled thermal graphite-moderated reactor. The reactor was dual-purpose - producing weapons-grade plutonium and providing heat and electricity. The RBMK series nuclear reactors are based on the ADE series reactors.

== History ==
Construction started in December 1963. The reactor was shut down in April 2010.

The scope of decommissioning was much greater than with AD and ADE-1, which were single-purpose and performed only defense tasks.

In 2021 it was decided to make ADE-2 a museum exhibition.

== Other similar types ==
	Start date	Shutdown date	Place	Purpose
AD	1958	1992	Zheleznogorsk, Krasnoyarsk Krai	plutonium production
ADE-1	1961	1992	Zheleznogorsk, Krasnoyarsk Krai	supposed to produce electricity in addition, but never did
ADE-3	1961	2008	Sibirskaya Nuclear Power Plant	dual purpose
ADE-4	1964	2008	Sibirskaya Nuclear Power Plant	dual purpose
ADE-5	1965	2008	Sibirskaya Nuclear Power Plant	dual purpose
I-1	1955	1990	Sibirskaya Nuclear Power Plant	dual purpose
EI-2	1958	1991	Sibirskaya Nuclear Power Plant	dual purpose

These two sources show slightly different date of start and shutdown.

Legacy AD and ADE-1 are almost decommissioned. ADE-3, ADE-4, and ADE-5 were being decommissioned as of 2024.

== See also ==
- MBIR - multi-loop research reactor intends to replace BOR-60. In construction since 2015, est. completion in 2027.
- RBMK - is a class of graphite-moderated nuclear power reactor designed and built by the Soviet Union.
