= Industrial radiography =

Type of non-destructive testing

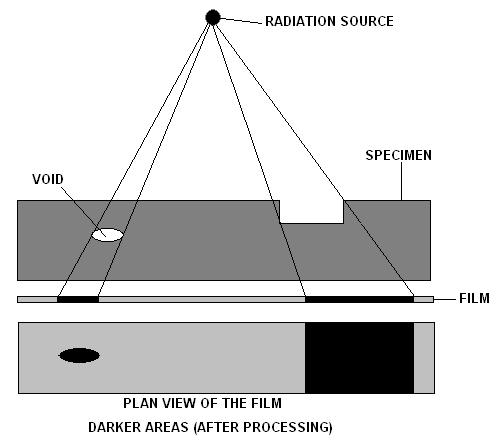
Making a radiograph

Industrial radiography is a modality of non-destructive testing that uses ionizing radiation to inspect materials and components with the objective of locating and quantifying defects and degradation in material properties that would lead to the failure of engineering structures. It plays an important role in the science and technology needed to ensure product quality and reliability. In Australia, industrial radiographic non-destructive testing is colloquially referred to as "bombing" a component with a "bomb".

Industrial Radiography uses either X-rays, produced with X-ray generators, or gamma rays generated by the natural radioactivity of sealed radionuclide sources. Neutrons can also be used. After crossing the specimen, photons are captured by a detector, such as a silver halide film, a phosphor plate, flat panel detector or CdTe detector. The examination can be performed in static 2D (named radiography), in real time 2D (fluoroscopy), or in 3D after image reconstruction (computed tomography or CT). It is also possible to perform tomography nearly in real time (4-dimensional computed tomography or 4DCT). Particular techniques such as X-ray fluorescence (XRF), X-ray diffractometry (XRD), and several other ones complete the range of tools that can be used in industrial radiography.

Inspection techniques can be portable or stationary. Industrial radiography is used in welding, casting parts or composite pieces inspection, in food inspection and luggage control, in sorting and recycling, in EOD and IED analysis, aircraft maintenance, ballistics, turbine inspection, in surface characterisation, coating thickness measurement, in counterfeit drug control, etc.

== History ==
Radiography started in 1895 with the discovery of X-rays (later also called Röntgen rays after the man who first described their properties in detail), a type of electromagnetic radiation. Soon after the discovery of X-rays, radioactivity was discovered. By using radioactive sources such as radium, far higher photon energies could be obtained than those from normal X-ray generators. Soon these found various applications, with one of the earliest users being Loughborough College. X-rays and gamma rays were put to use very early, before the dangers of ionizing radiation were discovered. After World War II new isotopes such as caesium-137, iridium-192 and cobalt-60 became available for industrial radiography, and the use of radium and radon decreased.

== Equipment ==
Industrial radiography requires specific physical tools to generate radiation and capture the resulting image. A cassette or casset is a lightproof container used to hold the recording media securely during exposure, protecting it from ambient light while allowing ionizing radiation to pass through. Depending on the specific system used, the cassette holds either traditional radiographic film pressed between intensifying screens, or a digital phosphor imaging plate.

== Applications ==
=== Inspection of products ===
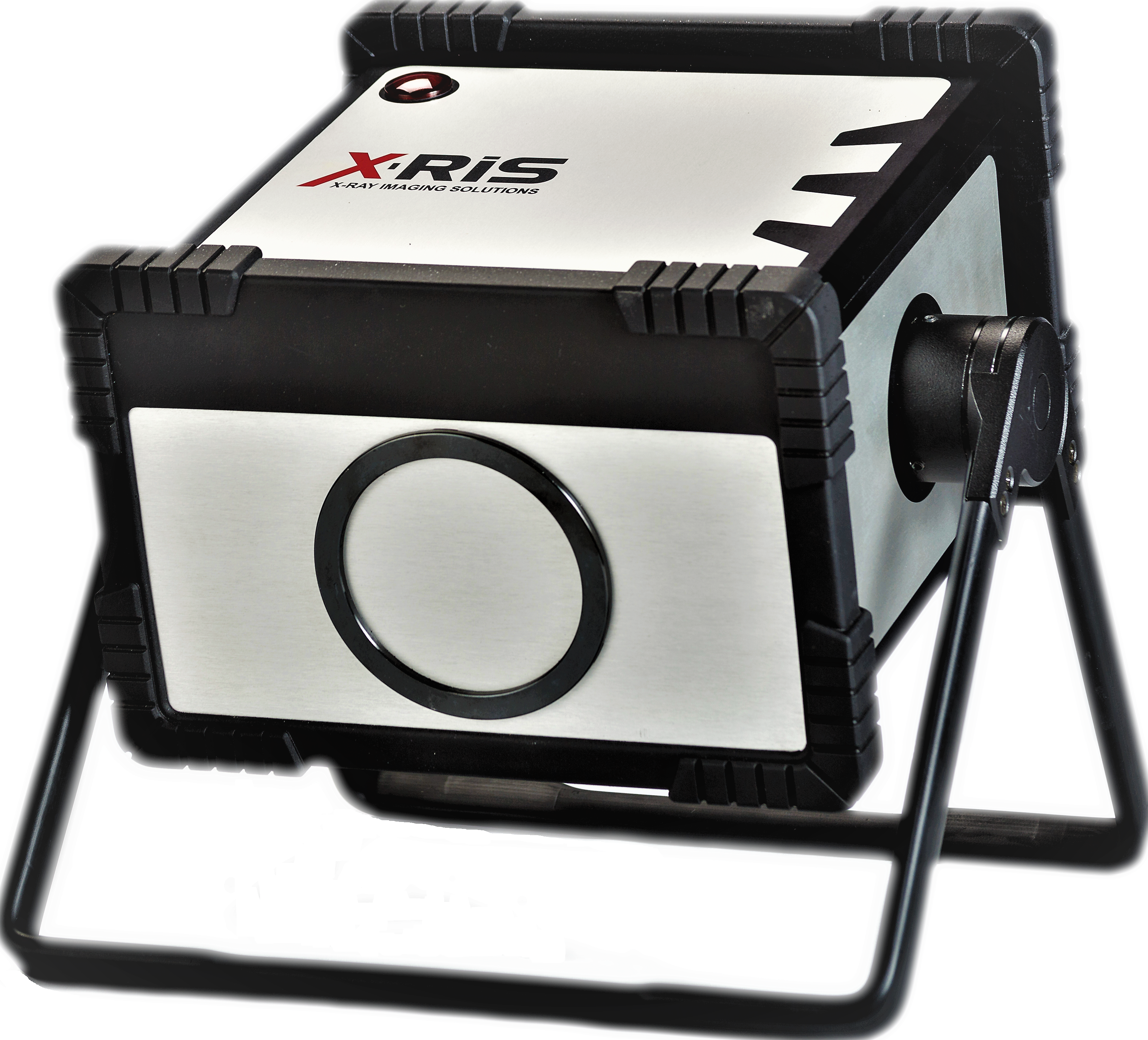
A portable wireless controlled battery powered X-ray generator for use in non-destructive testing and security.

Gamma radiation sources, most commonly iridium-192 and cobalt-60, are used to inspect a variety of materials. The vast majority of radiography concerns the testing and grading of welds on piping, pressure vessels, high-capacity storage containers, pipelines, and some structural welds. Other tested materials include concrete (locating rebar or conduit), welder's test coupons, machined parts, plate metal, or pipewall (locating anomalies due to corrosion or mechanical damage). Non-metal components such as ceramics used in the aerospace industries are also regularly tested. Theoretically, industrial radiographers could radiograph any solid, flat material (walls, ceilings, floors, square or rectangular containers) or any hollow cylindrical or spherical object.

=== Inspection of welding ===
The beam of radiation must be directed to the middle of the section under examination and must be normal to the material surface at that point, except in special techniques where known defects are best revealed by a different alignment of the beam. The length of weld under examination for each exposure shall be such that the thickness of the material at the diagnostic extremities, measured in the direction of the incident beam, does not exceed the actual thickness at that point by more than 6%. The specimen to be inspected is placed between the source of radiation and the detecting device, usually the film in a lightproof holder or cassette, and the radiation is allowed to penetrate the part for the required length of time to be adequately recorded.

The result is a two-dimensional projection of the part onto the film, producing a latent image of varying densities according to the amount of radiation reaching each area. It is known as a radio graph, as distinct from a photograph produced by light. Because film is cumulative in its response (the exposure increasing as it absorbs more radiation), relatively weak radiation can be detected by prolonging the exposure until the film can record an image that will be visible after development. The radiograph is examined as a negative, without printing as a positive as in photography. This is because, in printing, some of the detail is always lost and no useful purpose is served.

Before commencing a radiographic examination, it is always advisable to examine the component with one's own eyes, to eliminate any possible external defects. If the surface of a weld is too irregular, it may be desirable to grind it to obtain a smooth finish, but this is likely to be limited to those cases in which the surface irregularities (which will be visible on the radio graph) may make detecting internal defects difficult.

After this visual examination, the operator will have a clear idea of the possibilities of access to the two faces of the weld, which is important both for the setting up of the equipment and for the choice of the most appropriate technique.

Defects such as delaminations and planar cracks are difficult to detect using radiography, particularly to the untrained eye.

Without overlooking the negatives of radiographic inspection, radiography does hold many significant benefits over ultrasonics, particularly insomuch that as a 'picture' is produced keeping a semi permanent record for the life cycle of the film, more accurate identification of the defect can be made, and by more interpreters. Very important as most construction standards permit some level of defect acceptance, depending on the type and size of the defect.

To the trained radiographer, subtle variations in visible film density provide the technician the ability to not only accurately locate a defect, but identify its type, size and location; an interpretation that can be physically reviewed and confirmed by others, possibly eliminating the need for expensive and unnecessary repairs.

For purposes of inspection, including weld inspection, there exist several exposure arrangements.

First, there is the panoramic, one of the four single-wall exposure/single-wall view (SWE/SWV) arrangements. This exposure is created when the radiographer places the source of radiation at the center of a sphere, cone, or cylinder (including tanks, vessels, and piping). Depending upon client requirements, the radiographer would then place film cassettes on the outside of the surface to be examined. This exposure arrangement is nearly ideal – when properly arranged and exposed, all portions of all exposed film will be of the same approximate density. It also has the advantage of taking less time than other arrangements since the source must only penetrate the total wall thickness (WT) once and must only travel the radius of the inspection item, not its full diameter. The major disadvantage of the panoramic is that it may be impractical to reach the center of the item (enclosed pipe) or the source may be too weak to perform in this arrangement (large vessels or tanks).

The second SWE/SWV arrangement is an interior placement of the source in an enclosed inspection item without having the source centered up. The source does not come in direct contact with the item, but is placed a distance away, depending on client requirements. The third is an exterior placement with similar characteristics. The fourth is reserved for flat objects, such as plate metal, and is also radiographed without the source coming in direct contact with the item. In each case, the radiographic film is located on the opposite side of the inspection item from the source. In all four cases, only one wall is exposed, and only one wall is viewed on the radiograph.

Of the other exposure arrangements, only the contact shot has the source located on the inspection item. This type of radiograph exposes both walls, but only resolves the image on the wall nearest the film. This exposure arrangement takes more time than a panoramic, as the source must first penetrate the WT twice and travel the entire outside diameter of the pipe or vessel to reach the film on the opposite side. This is a double wall exposure/single wall view DWE/SWV arrangement. Another is the superimposure (wherein the source is placed on one side of the item, not in direct contact with it, with the film on the opposite side). This arrangement is usually reserved for very small diameter piping or parts. The last DWE/SWV exposure arrangement is the elliptical, in which the source is offset from the plane of the inspection item (usually a weld in pipe) and the elliptical image of the weld furthest from the source is cast onto the film.

=== Airport security ===
Both hold luggage and carry-on hand luggage are normally examined by X-ray machines using X-ray radiography. See airport security for more details.

=== Non-intrusive cargo scanning ===
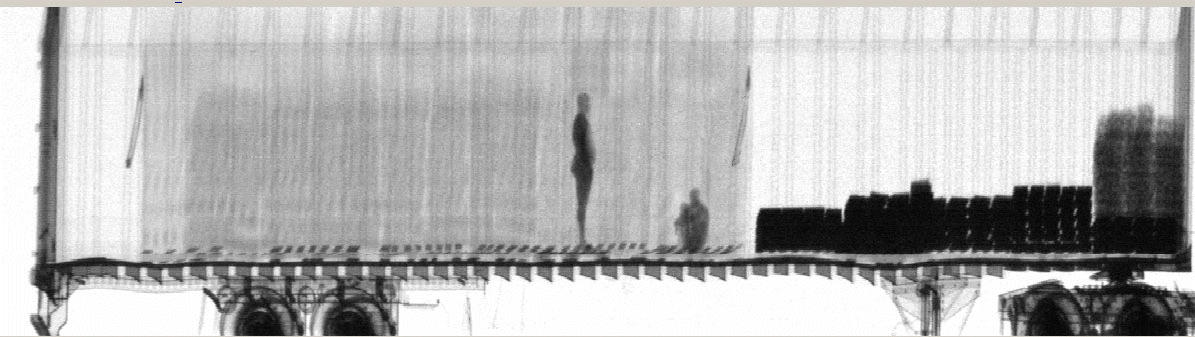
Gamma-ray image of intermodal cargo container with stowaways

Gamma radiography and high-energy X-ray radiography are currently used to scan intermodal freight cargo containers in US and other countries. Also research is being done on adapting other types of radiography like dual-energy X-ray radiography or muon radiography for scanning intermodal cargo containers.

=== Art ===
The American artist Kathleen Gilje has painted copies of Artemisia Gentileschi's Susanna and the Elders and Gustave Courbet's Woman with a Parrot. Before, she painted in lead white similar pictures with differences: Susanna fights the intrusion of the elders; there is a nude Courbet beyond the woman he paints. Then she painted over reproducing the original. Gilje's paintings are exhibited with radiographs that show the underpaintings, simulating the study of pentimentos and providing a comment on the old masters' work.

== Sources ==
Many types of ionizing radiation sources exist for use in industrial radiography.

=== X-Ray generators ===
X-ray generators produce X-rays by applying a high voltage between the cathode and the anode of an X-ray tube and in heating the tube filament to start the electron emission. The electrons are then accelerated in the resulting electric potential and collide with the anode, which is usually made of Tungsten.

The X-rays that are emitted by this generator are directed towards the object to control. They cross it and are absorbed according to the object material's attenuation coefficient. The attenuation coefficient is compiled from all the cross sections of the interactions that are happening in the material. The three most important inelastic interactions with X-rays at those energy levels are the photoelectric effect, compton scattering and pair production. After having crossed the object, the photons are captured by a detector, such as a silver halide film, a phosphor plate or flat panel detector. When an object is too thick, too dense, or its effective atomic number is too high, a linac can be used. They work in a similar way to produce X-rays, by electron collisions on a metal anode, the difference is that they use a much more complex method to accelerate them.

=== Sealed Radioactive Sources ===
Radionuclides are often used in industrial radiography. They have the advantage that they do not need a supply of electricity to function, but it also means that they can't be turned off. The two most common radionuclides used in industrial radiography are Iridium-192 and Cobalt-60. But others are used in general industry as well.

- Am-241: Backscatter gauges, smoke detectors, fill height and ash content detectors.
- Sr-90: Thickness gauging for thick materials up to 3 mm.
- Kr-85: Thickness gauging for thin materials like paper, plastics, etc.
- Cs-137: Density and fill height level switches.
- Ra-226: Ash content
- Cf-255: Ash content
- Ir-192: Industrial radiography
- Se-75: Industrial radiography
- Yb-169: Industrial radiography
- Co-60: Density and fill height level switches, industrial radiography

These isotopes emit radiation in a discrete set of energies, depending on the decay mechanism happening in the atomic nucleus. Each energies will have different intensities depending on the probability of a particular decay interaction. The most prominent energies in Cobalt-60 are 1.33 and 1.17 MeV, and 0.31, 0.47 and 0.60 MeV for Iridium-192. From a radiation safety point of view, this makes them more difficult to handle and manage. They always need to be enclosed in a shielded container and because they are still radioactive after their normal life cycle, their ownership often requires a license and they are usually tracked by a governmental body. If this is the case, their disposal must be done in accordance with the national policies. The radionuclides used in industrial radiography are chosen for their high specific activity. This high activity means that only a small sample is required to obtain a good radiation flux. However, higher activity often means higher dose in the case of an accidental exposure.

==== Radiographic cameras ====
A series of different designs have been developed for radiographic "cameras". Rather than the "camera" being a device that accepts photons to record a picture, the "camera" in industrial radiography is the radioactive photon source. Most industries are moving from film based radiography to a digital sensor based radiography much the same way that traditional photography has made this move. Since the amount of radiation emerging from the opposite side of the material can be detected and measured, variations in this amount (or intensity) of radiation are used to determine thickness or composition of material.

===== Shutter design =====
One design uses a moving shutter to expose the source. The radioactive source is placed inside a shielded box; a hinge allows part of the shielding to be opened, exposing the source and allowing photons to exit the radiography camera.

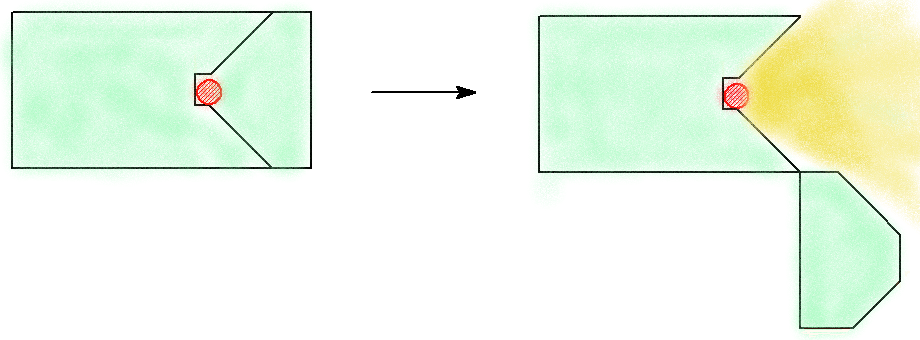
This shutter-type camera uses a hinge. The radioactive source is in red, the shielding is blue/green, and the gamma rays are yellow.

Another design for a shutter is where the source is placed in a metal wheel, which can turn inside the camera to move between the expose and storage positions.

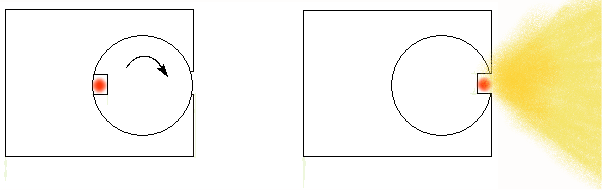
This shutter-type camera uses a wheel design. The radioactive source is in red, and the gamma rays are yellow.

Shutter-based devices require the entire device, including the heavy shielding, to be located at the exposure site. This can be difficult or impossible, so they have largely been replaced by cable-driven projectors.

===== Projector design =====
Modern projector designs use a cable drive mechanism to move the source along a hollow guide tube to the exposure location. The source is stored in a block of shielding that has an S-shaped tube-like hole through the block. In the safe position the source is in the center of the block. The source is attached to a flexible metal cable called a pigtail. To use the source a guide tube is attached to one side of the device while a drive cable is attached to the pigtail. Using a hand-operated control the source is then pushed out of the shield and along the source guide tube to the tip of the tube to expose the film, then cranked back into its fully shielded position.

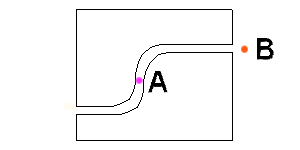
A diagram of the S-shaped hole through a metal block; the source is stored at point A and is driven out on a cable through a hole to point B. It often goes a long way along a guide tube to where it is needed.

=== Neutrons ===
In some rare cases, radiography is done with neutrons. This type of radiography is called neutron radiography (NR, Nray, N-ray) or neutron imaging. Neutron radiography provides different images than X-rays, because neutrons can pass with ease through lead and steel but are stopped by plastics, water and oils. Neutron sources include radioactive (^{241}Am/Be and Cf) sources, electrically driven D-T reactions in vacuum tubes and conventional critical nuclear reactors. It might be possible to use a neutron amplifier to increase the neutron flux.

== Safety ==
Radiation safety is a very important part of industrial radiography. The International Atomic Energy Agency has published a report describing the best practices in order to lower the amount of radiation dose the workers are exposed to. It also provides a list of national competent authorities responsible for approvals and authorizations regarding the handling of radioactive material.

=== Shielding ===
Shielding can be used to protect the user of the harmful properties of ionizing radiation. The type of material used for shielding depends on the type of radiation being used. National radiation safety authorities usually regulate the design, commissioning, maintenance and inspection of Industrial Radiography installations.

=== In the industry ===
Industrial radiographers are in many locations required by governing authorities to use certain types of safety equipment and to work in pairs. Depending on location industrial radiographers may have been required to obtain permits, licenses and/or undertake special training. Prior to conducting any testing the nearby area should always first be cleared of all other persons and measures should be taken to ensure that workers do not accidentally enter into an area that may expose them to dangerous levels of radiation.

The safety equipment usually includes four basic items: a radiation survey meter (such as a Geiger/Mueller counter), an alarming dosimeter or rate meter, a gas-charged dosimeter, and a film badge or thermoluminescent dosimeter (TLD). The easiest way to remember what each of these items does is to compare them to gauges on an automobile.

The survey meter could be compared to the speedometer, as it measures the speed, or rate, at which radiation is being picked up. When properly calibrated, used, and maintained, it allows the radiographer to see the current exposure to radiation at the meter. It can usually be set for different intensities, and is used to prevent the radiographer from being overexposed to the radioactive source, as well as for verifying the boundary that radiographers are required to maintain around the exposed source during radiographic operations.

The alarming dosimeter could be most closely compared with the tachometer, as it alarms when the radiographer "redlines" or is exposed to too much radiation. When properly calibrated, activated, and worn on the radiographer's person, it will emit an alarm when the meter measures a radiation level in excess of a preset threshold. This device is intended to prevent the radiographer from inadvertently walking up on an exposed source.

The gas-charged dosimeter is like a trip meter in that it measures the total radiation received, but can be reset. It is designed to help the radiographer measure his/her total periodic dose of radiation. When properly calibrated, recharged, and worn on the radiographer's person, it can tell the radiographer at a glance how much radiation to which the device has been exposed since it was last recharged. Radiographers in many states are required to log their radiation exposures and generate an exposure report. In many countries personal dosimeters are not required to be used by radiographers as the dose rates they show are not always correctly recorded.

The film badge or TLD is more like a car's odometer. It is actually a specialized piece of radiographic film in a rugged container. It is meant to measure the radiographer's total exposure over time (usually a month) and is used by regulating authorities to monitor the total exposure of certified radiographers in a certain jurisdiction. At the end of the month, the film badge is turned in and is processed. A report of the radiographer's total dose is generated and is kept on file.

When these safety devices are properly calibrated, maintained, and used, it is virtually impossible for a radiographer to be injured by a radioactive overexposure. The elimination of just one of these devices can jeopardize the safety of the radiographer and all those who are nearby. Without the survey meter, the radiation received may be just below the threshold of the rate alarm, and it may be several hours before the radiographer checks the dosimeter, and up to a month or more before the film badge is developed to detect a low intensity overexposure. Without the rate alarm, one radiographer may inadvertently walk up on the source exposed by the other radiographer. Without the dosimeter, the radiographer may be unaware of an overexposure, or even a radiation burn, which may take weeks to result in noticeable injury. And without the film badge, the radiographer is deprived of an important tool designed to protect him or her from the effects of a long-term overexposure to occupationally obtained radiation, and thus may suffer long-term health problems as a result.

There are three ways a radiographer will ensure they are not exposed to higher than required levels of radiation: time, distance, shielding. The less time that a person is exposed to radiation the lower their dose will be. The further a person is from a radioactive source the lower the level of radiation they receive, this is largely due to the inverse square law. Lastly the more a radioactive source is shielded by either better or greater amounts of shielding the lower the levels of radiation that will escape from the testing area. The most commonly used shielding materials in use are sand, lead (sheets or shot), steel, spent (non-radioactive uranium) tungsten and in suitable situations water.

Industrial radiography appears to have one of the worst safety profiles of the radiation professions, possibly because there are many operators using strong gamma sources (> 2 Ci) in remote sites with little supervision when compared with workers within the nuclear industry or within hospitals. Due to the levels of radiation present whilst they are working many radiographers are also required to work late at night when there are few other people present as most industrial radiography is carried out 'in the open' rather than in purpose built exposure booths or rooms. Fatigue, carelessness and lack of proper training are the three most common factors attributed to industrial radiography accidents. Many of the "lost source" accidents commented on by the International Atomic Energy Agency involve radiography equipment. Lost source accidents have the potential to cause a considerable loss of human life. One scenario is that a passerby finds the radiography source and not knowing what it is, takes it home. The person shortly afterwards becomes ill and dies as a result of the radiation dose. The source remains in their home where it continues to irradiate other members of the household. Such an event occurred in March 1984 in Casablanca, Morocco. This is related to the more famous Goiânia accident, where a related chain of events caused members of the public to be exposed to radiation sources.

== List of standards ==
=== International Organization for Standardization (ISO) ===
- ISO 4993, Steel and iron castings – Radiographic inspection
- ISO 5579, Non-destructive testing – Radiographic examination of metallic materials by X- and gamma-rays – Basic rules
- ISO 10675-1, Non-destructive testing of welds – Acceptance levels for radiographic testing – Part 1: Steel, nickel, titanium and their alloys
- ISO 11699-1, Non-destructive testing – Industrial radiographic films – Part 1: Classification of film systems for industrial radiography
- ISO 11699-2, Non-destructive testing – Industrial radiographic films – Part 2: Control of film processing by means of reference values
- ISO 14096-1, Non-destructive testing – Qualification of radiographic film digitisation systems – Part 1: Definitions, quantitative measurements of image quality parameters, standard reference film and qualitative control
- ISO 14096-2, Non-destructive testing – Qualification of radiographic film digitisation systems – Part 2: Minimum requirements
- ISO 17636-1: Non-destructive testing of welds. Radiographic testing. X- and gamma-ray techniques with film
- ISO 17636-2: Non-destructive testing of welds. Radiographic testing. X- and gamma-ray techniques with digital detectors
- ISO 19232, Non-destructive testing – Image quality of radiographs

=== European Committee for Standardization (CEN) ===
- EN 444, Non-destructive testing; general principles for the radiographic examination of metallic materials using X-rays and gamma-rays
- EN 462-1: Non-destructive testing – image quality of radiographs – Part 1: Image quality indicators (wire type) – determination of image quality value
- EN 462–2, Non-destructive testing – image quality of radiographs – Part 2: image quality indicators (step/hole type) determination of image quality value
- EN 462–3, Non-destructive testing – Image quality of radiogrammes – Part 3: Image quality classes for ferrous metals
- EN 462–4, Non-destructive testing – Image quality of radiographs – Part 4: Experimental evaluation of image quality values and image quality tables
- EN 462–5, Non-destructive testing – Image quality of radiographs – Part 5: Image quality of indicators (duplex wire type), determination of image unsharpness value
- EN 584–1, Non-destructive testing – Industrial radiographic film – Part 1: Classification of film systems for industrial radiography
- EN 584–2, Non-destructive testing – Industrial radiographic film – Part 2: Control of film processing by means of reference values
- EN 1330–3, Non-destructive testing – Terminology – Part 3: Terms used in industrial radiographic testing
- EN 2002–21, Aerospace series – Metallic materials; test methods – Part 21: Radiographic testing of castings
- EN 10246–10, Non-destructive testing of steel tubes – Part 10: Radiographic testing of the weld seam of automatic fusion arc welded steel tubes for the detection of imperfections
- EN 12517–1, Non-destructive testing of welds – Part 1: Evaluation of welded joints in steel, nickel, titanium and their alloys by radiography – Acceptance levels
- EN 12517–2, Non-destructive testing of welds – Part 2: Evaluation of welded joints in aluminium and its alloys by radiography – Acceptance levels
- EN 12679, Non-destructive testing – Determination of the size of industrial radiographic sources – Radiographic method
- EN 12681, Founding – Radiographic examination
- EN 13068, Non-destructive testing – Radioscopic testing
- EN 14096, Non-destructive testing – Qualification of radiographic film digitisation systems
- EN 14784–1, Non-destructive testing – Industrial computed radiography with storage phosphor imaging plates – Part 1: Classification of systems
- EN 14584–2, Non-destructive testing – Industrial computed radiography with storage phosphor imaging plates – Part 2: General principles for testing of metallic materials using X-rays and gamma rays

=== ASTM International (ASTM) ===
- ASTM E 94, Standard Guide for Radiographic Examination
- ASTM E 155, Standard Reference Radiographs for Inspection of Aluminum and Magnesium Castings
- ASTM E 592, Standard Guide to Obtainable ASTM Equivalent Penetrameter Sensitivity for Radiography of Steel Plates 1/4 to 2 in. [6 to 51 mm] Thick with X Rays and 1 to 6 in. [25 to 152 mm] Thick with Cobalt-60
- ASTM E 747, Standard Practice for Design, Manufacture and Material Grouping Classification of Wire Image Quality Indicators (IQI) Used for Radiology
- ASTM E 801, Standard Practice for Controlling Quality of Radiological Examination of Electronic Devices
- ASTM E 1030, Standard Test Method for Radiographic Examination of Metallic Castings
- ASTM E 1032, Standard Test Method for Radiographic Examination of Weldments
- ASTM 1161, Standard Practice for Radiologic Examination of Semiconductors and Electronic Components
- ASTM E 1648, Standard Reference Radiographs for Examination of Aluminum Fusion Welds
- ASTM E 1735, Standard Test Method for Determining Relative Image Quality of Industrial Radiographic Film Exposed to X-Radiation from 4 to 25 MeV
- ASTM E 1815, Standard Test Method for Classification of Film Systems for Industrial Radiography
- ASTM E 1817, Standard Practice for Controlling Quality of Radiological Examination by Using Representative Quality Indicators (RQIs)
- ASTM E 2104, Standard Practice for Radiographic Examination of Advanced Aero and Turbine Materials and Components

=== American Society of Mechanical Engineers (ASME) ===
- BPVC Section V, Nondestructive Examination: Article 2 Radiographic Examination

=== American Petroleum Institute (API) ===
- API 1104, Welding of Pipelines and Related Facilities: 11.1 Radiographic Test Methods

== See also ==
- Collimator
- Industrial computed tomography
- Medical radiography
