= Oregon State University Radiation Center =

Building on the Oregon State University campus in Corvallis, Oregon, U.S.

Coordinates: 44.565196°N 123.28913°W

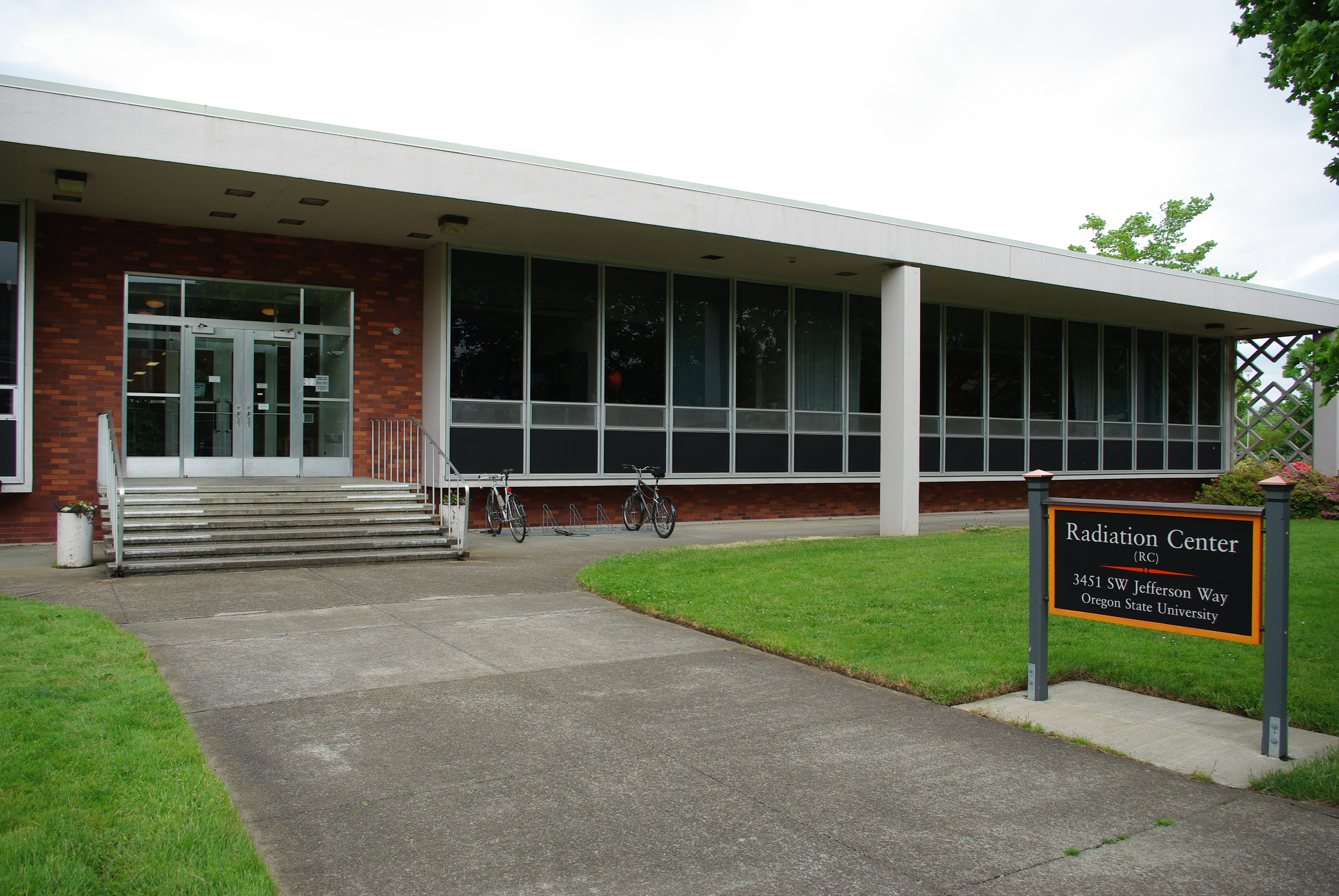
Entrance to the Radiation Center

The Oregon State University Radiation Center (OSURC) is a research facility at Oregon State University, a public land-grant research university in Corvallis, Oregon, United States. It houses a nuclear reactor, Gammacell 200 irradiator, several radiation laboratories, and multiple high-bay thermal hydraulics laboratories.

The Oregon State TRIGA Reactor (OSTR), Advanced Thermal Hydraulics Research Laboratory (ATHRL), and Advanced Nuclear Systems Engineering Laboratory (ANSEL) serve the research needs of the OSU nuclear engineering, health physics, mechanical engineering, civil engineering, materials science, chemistry, and physics departments along with intermittent work with other departments across the university and third parties from across the world. About 70% of the research projects at the OSU Radiation Center use the reactor.

The OSURC is located on the west side of the OSU campus, across the street from the Environmental Protection Agency (EPA) offices and about half a mile from Reser Stadium.

== Oregon State University TRIGA Reactor ==
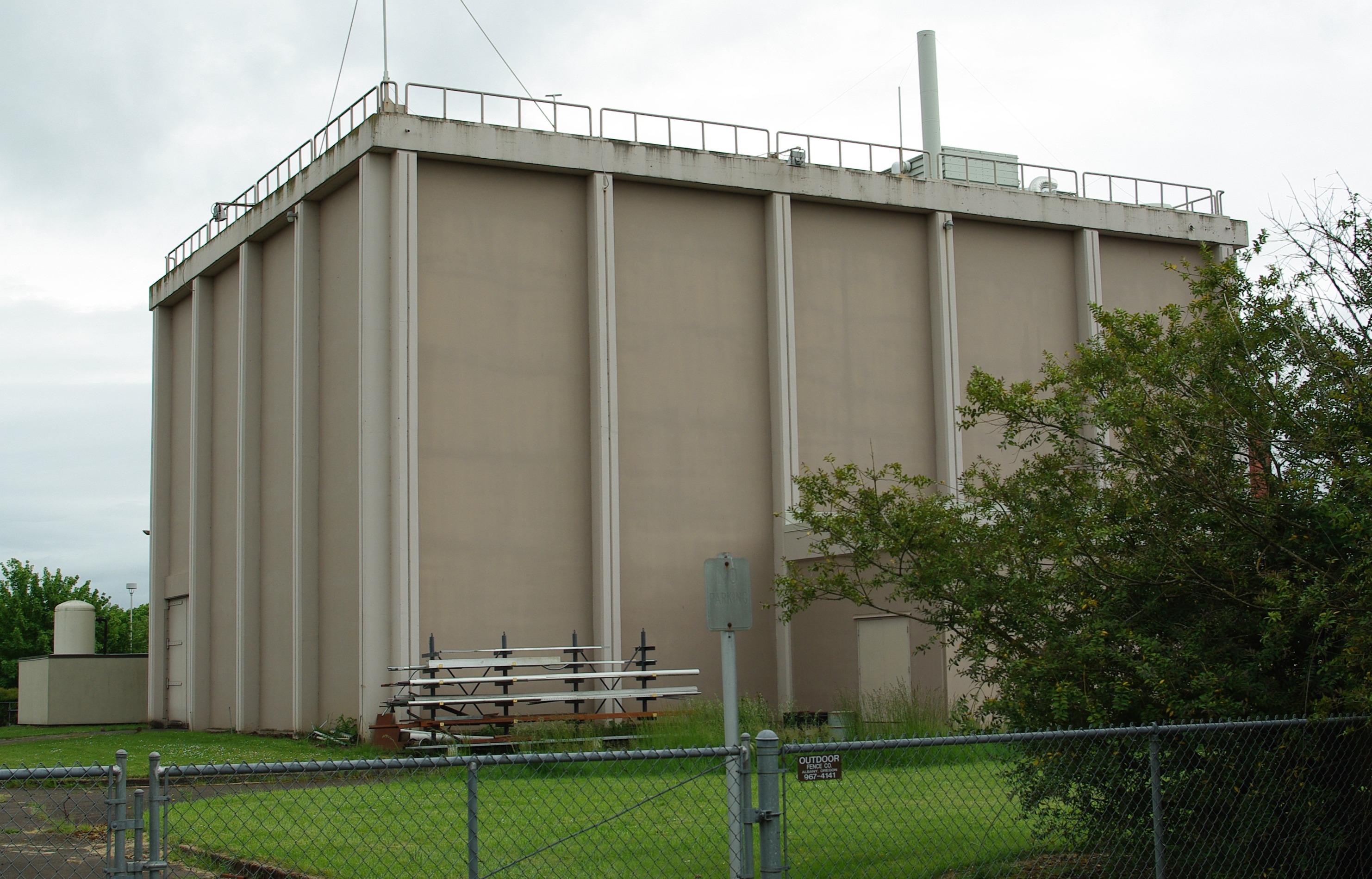
Exterior of reactor

The Oregon State TRIGA Reactor (OSTR) is a TRIGA Mk. II research reactor, developed by General Atomics, with a maximum licensed thermal output of 1.1 MW, and it can be pulsed up to a power of 3000 MW for a very short time.

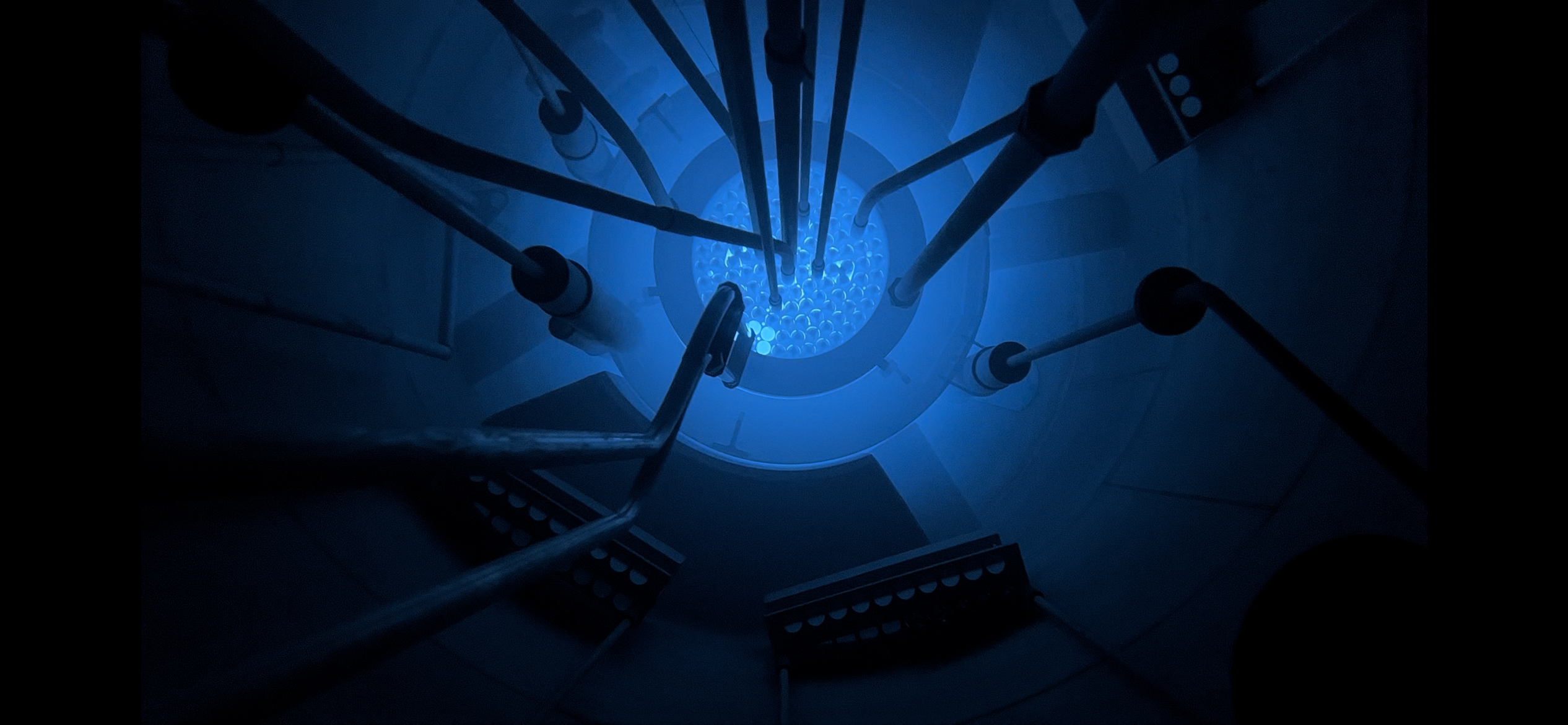
An image of the Oregon State TRIGA Reactor (OSTR) core immediately following a reactor pulse

The fuel is high-assay, low-enriched uranium (HALEU) in the form of uranium zirconium hydride (UZrH) with an erbium burnable poison. Operation began in 1967.

The reactor supported 96 academic courses in 1999. These courses were in chemistry, civil engineering, chemical engineering, geosciences, oceanography and atmospheric sciences, bioresource engineering, honors college and naval engineering disciplines.

The OSU Radiation center supported 126 projects in 2000 with 69% directly involving use of the OSTR. Contracts supporting these projects in 2000 totaled $3 million.

=== In-Core Irradiation Facilities ===
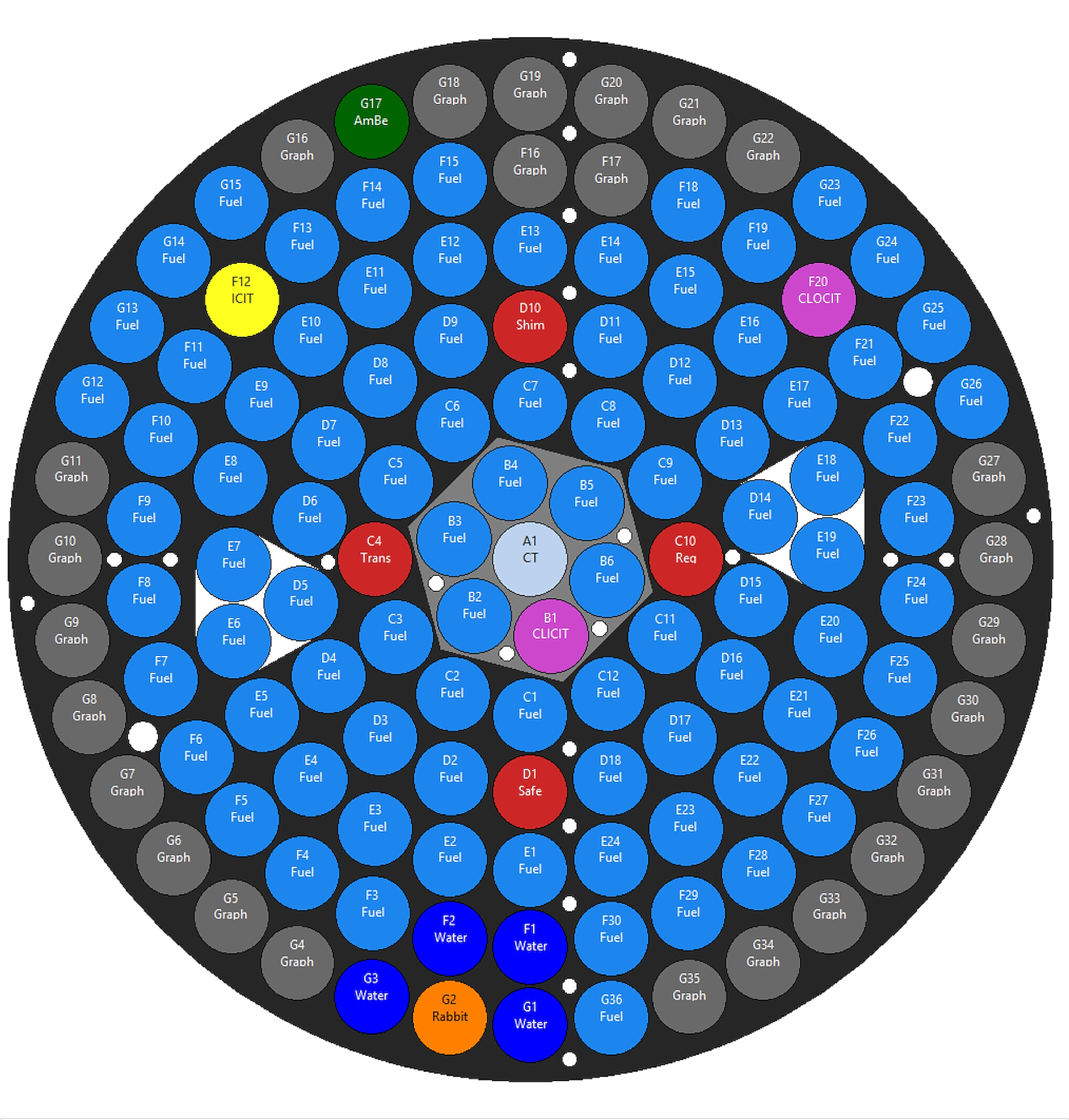
Current OSTR Core Configuration

The OSTR has six in-core irradiation facilities.

The Central Thimble is a water-filled tube extending down into the reactor core central grid position A-1. Its purpose is to provide the highest flux possible; however, it is currently not in use at OSTR due to numerous practical and experimental constraints.

The Cadmium-Lined In-Core Irradiation Tube (or CLICIT) is an air-filled aluminum tube surrounded by a thin lining of cadmium metal that occupies the B-1 grid position in the central area of the core. Cadmium is a thermal neutron absorber, allowing only epithermal neutrons and fast neutrons to enter. The primary purpose of this facility is Ar-Ar dating, K-Ar dating, and neutron activation analysis via neutron bombardment.

The In-Core Irradiation Tube (or ICIT) is located in grid position F-12 in the second-most outer ring of the reactor core, and it provides the highest neutron flux of any facility currently in use at OSTR. It is identical in construction to the CLICIT but lacks cadmium lining, resulting in unfiltered neutron irradiation.

The Cadmium-Lined Outer-Core Irradiation Tube (or CLOCIT) is identical in construction to the CLICIT and is positioned in the same ring as the ICIT, in grid position F-20. Its purpose is identical to the CLICIT; however, due to its location in the core periphery and the neutron flux profile in the core, irradiations take 1.8 times longer to provide the same neutron fluence as an irradiation in the B1 CLICIT.

The Pneumatic Transfer System, colloquially known as the Rabbit, is an irradiation facility that is pneumatically operated to rapidly insert and remove samples from the outermost ring of the core in position G-2. Irradiations can be performed for as little as five seconds and samples are prepared, sent, and received from a fume hood in an auxiliary laboratory adjacent to the reactor bay. The primary purpose of this facility is to perform neutron activation analysis using isotopes with short half-lives.

The Rotating Rack, colloquially known as the Lazy Susan, is a ring-shaped container surrounding the core between the core and the graphite neutron reflector. It rotates around the core about once a minute, providing an even flux to the samples inside. This facility has 40 nitrogen-filled slots for samples to be irradiated in.

=== Thermal column ===
The thermal column is a large graphite slab that pierces the concrete bioshield of the reactor and makes contact with the graphite neutron reflector surrounding the core. The purpose of the thermal column is to create an irradiation facility that filters out high energy neutrons to create a high thermal neutron flux. The thermal column is primarily used for fission tracking of certain minerals that contain fissile material.

=== Neutron Beam Ports ===
The OSTR has four neutron beam ports that penetrate the reactor tank and allow intense neutron and gamma radiation to exit the concrete bioshield for various research and commercial purposes.

Of the four beam ports at OSTR, there are two radial beam ports, one tangential beam port, and one radial piercing beam port. All three radial beam ports are aligned with the axial midplane of the reactor core, and point directly at the center of the core.

The two, standard radial beam ports (beam ports #1 and #2) terminate at the outer radius of the graphite neutron reflector, but are aligned with air-filled cans within the reflector to limit neutron scattering and absorption in the beam lines.

The radial piercing beam port (beam port #4) terminates at the inner radius of the graphite neutron reflector annulus, and is connected to the reflector via a bellows to accommodate thermal expansion differences between the reactor tank and reactor core assembly.

The tangential beam port (beam port #3) runs tangent to the reactor core and terminates at the outer radius of the graphite neutron reflector. Like the standard radial ports, an air-filled can is within the reflector and aligned with the beam port, adjacent to beam port #4, the piercing beam port.

As of now, there are only two beam ports in use at OSTR: beam port #1 and beam port #3.

Beam port #3, the tangential beam port, is the most used beam port at the OSTR. The facility attached is used for neutron radiography and, as such, is called the Neutron Radiography Facility or NRF. The NRF houses an pneumatically-controlled, counter-balanced beam shutter made of boral (a boron-aluminum composite material) and lead, that allows the operator to control the facility from outside the facility. The facility features numerous safety mechanisms to ensure the access doors and shutter are never open in conjunction, including an automatic reactor scram system if the shutter and doors are open together.

Beam port #1, one of the standard, radial ports, is used for many research purposes. The facility attached currently is called the Beam Port #1 Facility (BP1F), and is a repurposed version of the Prompt Gamma Neutron Activation Analysis (PGNAA) facility that was once installed on Beam Port #4, before it was decommissioned due to a small reactor tank leak. The BP1F can perform prompt gamma neutron activation analysis, as well as low-magnitude neutron flux irradiations.

== Safety ==
Oregon Department of Energy has coordinated the HAZMAT Radiological Training Courses at the center for HAZMAT response teams throughout the state of Oregon for the last 15 years. Additionally, federal guidelines require a rapid, armed response to incidents that may occur at the Radiation Center, which is provided by the on-campus Public Safety force since 2021. Prior to this, OSU contracted with Oregon State Police since 1989 for this role.

== Forensic analysis ==
The reactor has also used Neutron activation analysis to help with the forensic analysis in a high-profile serial killer case (the I-5 Bandit) and several other cases.
