= William Rubin =

American art curator (1927–2006)

William S. Rubin
- Born: William Stanley Rubin; August 11, 1927; Brooklyn, New York, United States
- Died: January 22, 2006 (aged 78); Pound Ridge, New York, United States
- Education: Columbia University (BA, PhD)
- Occupation: Art curator
- Employer: The Museum of Modern Art
- Spouse: Phyllis Hattis [widow]
- Children: Beatrice Rubin

William Stanley Rubin (August 11, 1927 – January 22, 2006) was an American art scholar, a distinguished curator, critic, collector, art historian and teacher of modern art.

From 1968 to 1988, Rubin was a curator at The Museum of Modern Art located in New York City and, from 1973 to 1988, he served as director of the Painting and Sculpture Department. He played a key role in building MoMA's collection, in particular acquiring works of abstract expressionism, and organized many groundbreaking exhibitions (see below). His younger brother Lawrence Rubin (1933–2018) was an art dealer in NYC and in Europe.

== Biography ==
=== Background and education ===
William S. Rubin was born in Brooklyn, New York, the eldest of three children. His father was a textile merchant who owned several factories. Rubin was educated in public schools in Brooklyn before the family moved to Riverdale, New York, where he attended the Fieldston School. There he took an art course with Victor D’Amico, who was also director of education at the Museum of Modern Art. At the time, Rubin was not interested in pursuing a career in the visual arts, for he aspired to become an orchestra conductor. Upon graduation from high school, he went to Columbia University, ostensibly to study music. His studies were interrupted by a stint in the army. While stationed in Rome, Italy, he played the clarinet in a marching band. When the war ended, he returned to New York and resumed his studies at Columbia University. There he enrolled in classes taught by the distinguished art historian, Meyer Shapiro, who specialized in both modern and medieval art. Rubin consequently became interested in both fields and wrote his doctoral dissertation on the Church of Assy in the French Alps with an interior that was decorated by modern artists in the years after World War II: Henri Matisse, Pierre Bonnard, Georges Rouault, Marc Chagall, Jean Lurçat, and others. Rubin graduated from Columbia College in 1949 with a bachelor's degree in Italian language and literature. He studied musicology at the University of Paris for a year before returning to Columbia, earning a Ph.D. in art history and archeology in 1959.

=== Career ===
In 1952, Rubin began teaching art history at Sarah Lawrence College and at Hunter College of the City University of New York. In the mid-1950s, he was introduced to Alfred Barr, founding director of the Museum of Modern Art, who invited him to lecture at the museum and eventually to serve as curator of a show on the surrealist painter Roberto Matta. In the mid-1960s, Rubin began writing a book on Dada and Surrealism; upon hearing of this project, Barr invited him to organize a show on the subject for the museum. While preparing that show, Rubin joined the museum's staff as permanent curator. In 1968, he organized and wrote the catalog for Dada, Surrealism and Their Heritage for the Museum of Modern Art and, in the same year, Rubin's Dada & Surrealist Art, a 525-page survey on the subject, was published by Harry N. Abrams, New York. Throughout his years at the museum, Rubin acquired works with the dedication and passion of a private collector (which he also was). Almost immediately upon being hired by the museum, he persuaded the art dealer Sidney Janis and his wife Harriet to donate their formidable collection of modern art to the museum, one of many collections that he would secure during his twenty-year tenure there. Others include works from the collections of William S. Paley, Nina and Gordon Bunshaft, Wolfgang and Florene May Schoenborn, John Hay Whitney, Peggy and David Rockefeller, Mary Sisler, Richard S. Zeisler, and others. From collectors such as these, or through direct purchases by the museum, Rubin managed to acquire some of the most important works of art in the museum's collection: Marcel Duchamp, The Bicycle Wheel (1913/51), Constantin Brâncuși, The Endless Column (1918), Pablo Picasso, Charnel House (1944–45), Henri Matisse, Memory of Oceana (1952–53) and The Swimming Pool (1952), Jackson Pollock, One: Number 31 (1950). He even gave the museum David Smith's Australia (1951) from his own private collection. Through his position at the museum, he was able to meet and befriend Picasso at his home in the south of France. In 1971, the artist gave him for the museum's collection his Cubist Guitar (1914), an iconic metal and wire sculpture and, over the years, Rubin was instrumental in acquiring many other important works by the artist for the museum.

=== Exhibitions ===
In addition to Dada, Surrealism and their Heritage (1968), during his tenure at the museum Rubin organized some of the most important and memorable shows held there, several of which could be classified today as blockbusters (although the term was not then in popular usage to describe museum exhibitions). He made it a habit of installing these shows while circulating around the galleries in a wheelchair (a skiing accident left him partially lame in one leg), directing the placement of work like the conductor of a symphony orchestra, the career to which he had earlier aspired. Because he was a known collector, even before he came to the museum, Rubin made a special effort to befriend the contemporary artists whose work he collected. The most fruitful and enduring relationship was with the American abstract painter Frank Stella, for whom he organized two comprehensive exhibitions, one in 1970 and another in 1987. In conjunction with the American art historians John Rewald and Theodore Reff, in 1978 he organized Cézanne: The Late Work, a monumental exhibition featuring work from the last decade of the artist's life, the period which most profoundly influenced the modernist evolution in the early years of the 20th Century.

In the late 1970s, the museum was scheduled to close for a major renovation, so Rubin seized the opportunity to present Pablo Picasso: A Retrospective (1980), a show that filled the entire museum with a comprehensive survey of the artist's seventy-five year career. This was followed with Primitivism in Twentieth-Century Art: Affinity of the Tribal and the Modern (1984), which he organized with the art historian Kirk Varnedoe. It was his most controversial exhibition, for critics complained that in the process of comparing examples of African and Oceanic art with modern works influenced by them, the primitive artifacts lost their original meaning and significance. “The notion that you can look at a work of art as pure form strikes me as idiocy,” he explained to the writer Calvin Tomkins. “If the work comes at you, it comes with everything it’s got, all at once.”

Rubin's last two major exhibitions at the museum were devoted to Picasso. The first, Picasso and Braque: Pioneering Cubism (1989), attempted to analyze the intimate and complex interchange between the work of these two artists during the critical period in which Cubism was formed, and the second, Picasso and Portraiture (1996), followed the artist's many attempts to capture the essence of his friends and associates, especially the women and wives who came in and out of his life serving as his models and muses.

=== Personal life and death ===
In the late 1960s, Rubin moved into a large loft on 13th Street and Broadway in New York City, which he filled with examples of art from the Abstract Expressionist period (Jackson Pollock, Franz Kline, Barnett Newman, Adolph Gottlieb, Hans Hofmann, Willem de Kooning, Robert Motherwell, Clyfford Still, Mark Rothko, Herbert Ferber, David Smith, as well as paintings and sculpture by a select number of contemporary artists (Frank Stella, Jasper Johns, Kenneth Noland, Larry Bell, Jules Olitski, Morris Louis, George Segal (artist), Roy Lichtenstein, etc.). Here Rubin organized gatherings of artists, art historians, dealers and critics, one memorable photograph taken in 1967 records him speaking to Frank Stella, Barbara Rose, Larry Poons, Lucinda Childs, Wilder Green, Annalee and Barnett Newman and Phyllis Hattis (whom he would later marry). In the late 1960s, Rubin purchased land in the south of France not far from where Picasso had lived and began building a home there. It was a palatial estate with an Olympic-sized swimming pool in the village of Le Plan-de-la-Tour that he called L’Oubradou, “workshop” in Provençal, because most of his writings were done there during the summer months. Rubin lived in New York City, but also maintained a residence in Pound Ridge, New York, where he acquired rare and exotic trees; from his living room, oversaw their placement in the surrounding landscape—again—like the conductor of a symphony orchestra. After a number of years in declining health, he died there in his Pound Ridge home in 2006 at the age of 78.

== Impact ==
Rubin's post at the Museum of Modern Art made him one of the most powerful and influential individuals in the art world of his day, but he eventually realized that it was time for a younger generation to take over, so he retired in 1988, appointing Kirk Varnedoe (with whom he had organized the Primitivism Show in 1984) his chosen successor. Varnedoe died of cancer at the age of fifty-seven in 2003, and the position was eventually filled by three separate curators.

=== Artists ===
Late in his career, Rubin said that he had hoped his exhibitions had a meaningful influence on the artists who saw them. “I’m personally most curious about whatever repercussions shows have on artists, and hence, on art history,” he explained. “To the extent that the public gets caught up in them, so much the better.”

=== Awards ===
Chevalier, Légion d’honneur

=== Works ===
In 2005, Rubin was depicted by the artist Kathleen Gilje in the guise of Picasso, as he appeared in a photographic portrait by Henri Cartier-Bresson.

== Books ==
Matta (New York: Museum of Modern Art, 1957)

Modern Sacred Art and the Church of Assy (New York: Columbia University Press, 1961)

Dada and Surrealist Art (New York: Harry N. Abrams, 1968)

Picasso in the Collection of the Museum of Modern Art (New York: Museum of Modern Art, 1971)

André Masson [with Carolyn Lanchner] (New York: Museum of Modern Art, 1976)

Cézanne: The Late Work [with John Rewald and Theodore Reff] (New York: Museum of Modern Art, 1978)

Pablo Picasso: A Retrospective (New York: Museum of Modern Art, 1980)

Primitivism in Twentieth-Century Art: Affinity of the Tribal and the Modern [with Kirk Varnedoe] (New York: Museum of Modern Art, 1984

Picasso and Braque: Pioneering Cubism (New York: Museum of Modern Art, 1989)

Picasso and Portraiture (New York: Museum of Modern Art, 1996)

== Bibliography ==
- Picasso, Pablo; Rubin, William S.; Fluegel, Jane; Museum of Modern Art (1980). Pablo Picasso – A Retrospective – The Museum of Modern Art, New York (May 22 – Sept. 16, 1980). New York City: Museum of Modern Art. ISBN 978-0-87070-519-9.
- Rubin, William Stanley; Picasso, Pablo; Braque, Georges; Museum of Modern Art (1989). Picasso and Braque: Pioneering Cubism. New York City: Museum of Modern Art; Boston: Bulfinch Press (distributor). ISBN 978-0-87070-675-2.
- Rubin, William Stanley; Seckel, Hélène Seckel; Cousins, Judith (1995). Les Demoiselles d'Avignon. New York City: Museum of Modern Art; H.N. Abrams. ISBN 978-0-87070-162-7

. Frank Stella 1970-1987 MOMA

- Cremonini, Timeless monumentality, New York, 1957, in Painting and Drawing from the William Louis-Dreyfus Foundation, Fairfield University Art Museum, 2016

== See also ==
- Lists of American writers
- List of historians by area of study
- List of people from Brooklyn, New York
