= Michelle Espy =

American physicist

Michelle Anna Espy is an American physicist at the Los Alamos National Laboratory who studies ultra-low-field nuclear magnetic resonance magnetic resonance imaging using SQUIDs, with applications including magnetoencephalography (the recording of magnetic fields generated by brain activity) and the detection of explosive materials and nerve agents in airline security screening. At Los Alamos, she has also worked on neutron imaging of stockpiled weapons and of the skull of the Bisti Beast, a fossil tyrannosaur.

== Education and career ==
Espy is originally from Southern California, and studied physics as an undergraduate at the University of California, Riverside. She earned her Ph.D. from the University of Minnesota, and came to the Los Alamos National Laboratory in 1996 as a postdoctoral researcher.

== Book ==
Espy is a coauthor of the book Ultra-Low Field Nuclear Magnetic Resonance: A New MRI Regime (with Robert Kraus Jr., Per Magnelind, and Petr Volegov, Oxford University Press, 2014).

== Recognition ==
Espy was named as a Fellow of the American Physical Society, in the 2014 class of fellows, "for the application of nuclear physics techniques to biomedical research and national security challenges, including pioneering work in the application of ultra-low field nuclear magnetic resonance to functional brain imaging and non-invasive identification of materials for national security."

A portable magnetic resonance imaging machine, developed by Espy and her team for use in developing countries and battleground medical situations, was named one of the top ten physics breakthroughs of 2015 by Physics World.
