= Transient Reactor Test Facility =

Nuclear facility in Idaho, United States

Coordinates: 43.68647°N 112.75998°W

Location in the United States
Location in Idaho, west of Idaho Falls

The Transient Reactor Test Facility (TREAT) is an air-cooled, graphite moderated, thermal spectrum test nuclear reactor designed to test reactor fuels and structural materials. Constructed in 1958, and operated from 1959 until 1994, TREAT was built to conduct transient reactor tests where the test material is subjected to neutron pulses that can simulate conditions ranging from mild transients to reactor accidents. TREAT was designed by Argonne National Laboratory, and is located at the Idaho National Laboratory. Since original construction, the facility had additions or systems upgrades in 1963, 1972, 1982, and 1988. The 1988 addition was extensive, and included upgrades of most of the instrumentation and control systems.

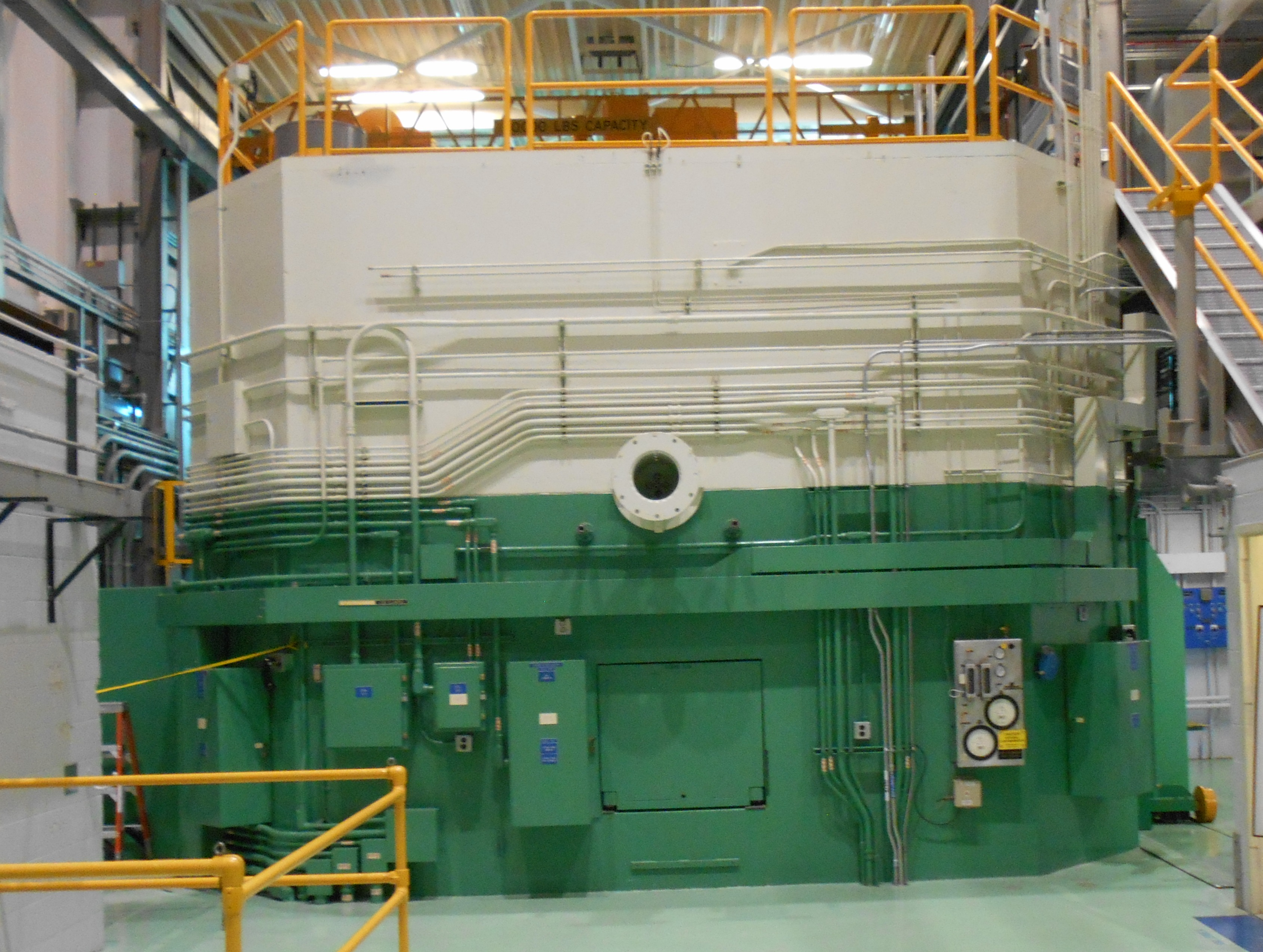
TREAT Reactor (south side)

The U.S. Department of Energy (DOE) decided to resume a program of transient testing, and planned to invest about $75 million to restart the TREAT facility by 2018. The renewed interest in TREAT was sparked by the 2011 Fukushima Daiichi nuclear disaster, which prompted the shutdown of Japan's and Germany's nuclear plants. One use for TREAT is planned to be testing of new accident-tolerant fuel for nuclear reactors. TREAT was successfully restarted in November 2017, under budget and ahead of schedule, and is currently still in operation.

== Fuel and core ==
The TREAT fuel assemblies are approximately 9 feet long, and 4 inches square in cross section. The fuel is a graphite uranium mixture, with 1 part uranium to 10,000 parts graphite. The active portion of the fuel assembly is about 48 inches, with a graphite reflector of about 24 inches above and below the active portion. The active portion of the fuel assemblies are encased with Zircaloy. There is also a graphite axial reflector, composed of two parts. The first part of the axial reflector consists of movable assemblies similar to the fuel assemblies, but containing only graphite and no fuel. The second part of the axial reflector consists of permanent blocks of graphite, approximately 24 inches thick, stacked outside the core cavity. This permanent reflector was reclaimed from Chicago Pile-1, the world's first nuclear reactor. The core may be loaded to a size of 5 feet by 5 feet (nominal) up to 6 feet by 6 feet (maximum), depending on the needs of the experiment.

As described above, the fuel is composed of a mixture of graphite and uranium. The uranium is in the form of uranium oxide particles that are approximately 20 microns in size, and are in direct contact with the graphite moderator. The graphite, in addition to being the neutron moderator, also acts as a large thermal heat sink. The time lag of the heat transfer is on the order of 1 millisecond, much faster than the heat transfer to a liquid coolant flowing past fuel assemblies. Also, when the graphite is heated it creates a sizable negative moderator temperature coefficient. These characteristics allow TREAT to produce large 'self-limited' transients, which are limited by the fuel negative moderator coefficient without control rod movement.

== Experimental capabilities ==
TREAT is capable of a wide range of operations and test conditions. TREAT can operate at a steady state power of 120 kW, produce short transients of up to 19 GW, or produce shaped transients controlled by the TREAT automatic reactor control system and the Control Rods. A test assembly can be inserted in the center of the core. The test assembly is a self-contained vehicle, that can contain fuel or materials for a variety of reactor types. These test assemblies, also referred to as test vehicles or test loops, can simulate the conditions of a light water reactor, heavy water reactor, liquid metal fast breeder reactor, or a gas cooled reactor.

In some experiments, provisions were made to make high speed film recordings of the experiment, such as these videos.

=== Hodoscope ===
TREAT has a fast-neutron hodoscope that collimates and detects fast fission neutrons emitted by the experiment fuel sample.

The TREAT hodoscope consists of a front collimator, a rear collimator, a bank of detectors, electronics to interface to the detectors, and a data acquisition system. The collimator has 10 columns with 36 rows, which are aligned to an array (or arrays) of 360 detectors. The hodoscope provides time and spatial resolution of fuel motion during transients and in-place measurement of fuel distribution before, during, and after an experiment. One array of detectors consists of Hornyak Button detectors. The Hornyak Button is a fast neutron detector that consists of a film of ZnS applied to lucite, which together form the 'button'. The button is attached to a photomultiplier tube. This detector shows good efficiency at detecting fast neutrons in a background of thermal neutrons and gamma radiation.

=== Neutron radiography facility ===
TREAT has a neutron radiography facility on the west face of the reactor. This allows non-destructive examination of experiment test assembly (or other materials) up to 4 meters in length. TREAT can operate at steady state power levels of up to 120 kW to produce neutrons for the radiography facility.

== Systems ==
=== Control rod drives ===
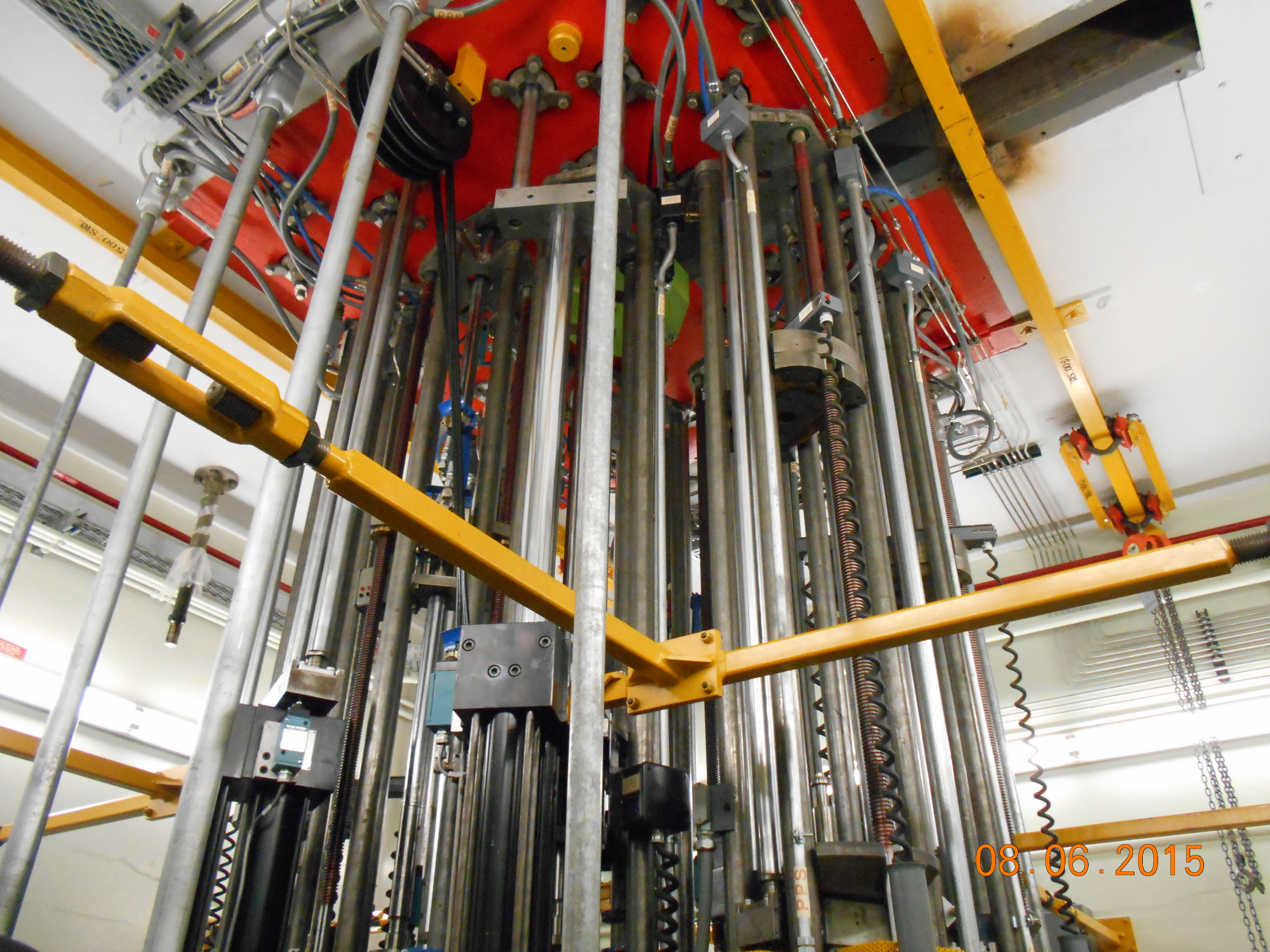
TREAT Control Rod Drive Mechanisms

TREAT has three banks of control rod drive mechanisms, the control/shutdown rods, the compensation/shutdown rods, and the transient rods. There are 4 drive mechanisms in each group. The drive mechanisms are below the reactor, and raise the control rods out of the reactor to increase reactivity. These banks of control rods are arranged in two rings. The inner ring contains four drive mechanisms, the compensation/shutdown rods, with one control rod for each drive mechanism. The outer ring has four control/shutdown drive mechanisms and four transient rod drive mechanisms. The control/shutdown and transient rod drive mechanisms have two control rods for each drive mechanism. All the control rods contain B_{4}C poison sections. The compensation/shutdown and control/shutdown drive mechanisms are mechanical lead screw driven, and have use pneumatic pressure to assist the scram function. The four transient rod drives are hydraulically actuated, and are controlled by the Automatic Reactor Control System (ARCS) to control transients. These transient rods move up to 170 in/sec over a total travel of 40 inches (i.e. full 40 inch stroke in about 0.24 seconds).

=== Reactor Trip System ===
The TREAT Reactor Trip System (RTS) is designed to automatically shut down the TREAT reactor if any of several measured parameter exceed predetermined setpoints. In this basic function the TREAT RTS is similar to the Reactor Protection System (RPS) at a commercial power plant. However the TREAT RTS is different from a commercial plant RPS in several ways. First, a commercial plant RPS uses combinational logic (e.g. 2 out of 3, or 2 out of 4) of the protection system channels to reduce the chance of an inadvertent reactor trip. The TREAT RTS has 3 channels of Transient instrumentation and 2 channels of Steady-State instrumentation. The TREAT RTS will trip the reactor if any channel indicates the need for a trip. Since TREAT does not operate for long periods of time, the use of combinational logic to reduce the chance of an inadvertent trip is not needed. Secondly, the TREAT RTS has more nuclear instrument associated trips, and fewer process related trips than a commercial plant. For example commercial plants (PWRs) may have trips on Steam Generator Level, Reactor Coolant System Flow, or loss of load (main generator or turbine trip). TREAT does not have as many process related trips, due to the relatively simple process systems.

=== Automatic Reactor Control System (ARCS) ===
Control of reactor power during transients is done by the Automatic Reactor Control System (ARCS). The ARCS was one of the systems installed during the 1988 upgrades to TREAT. The system installed then was based on Intel Multibus Chassis computers which used Intel 8086 microprocessors. The transient to be performed is defined by a "transient prescription", which is input into the ARCS prior to each transient.

In 2019 the ARCS was replaced with a National Instruments PXI system with LabView software. This new system performs the same functions as the previous system, with some enhancements to the algorithms.

In 2024 the ARCS software was improved to allow transients with complex waveforms. As an example of this versatility, a transient was run that had a power profile shape that outlined the shape of the state of Idaho.

== TREAT Restart ==
On November 14, 2017, the TREAT reactor achieved criticality for the first time since 1994. This was accomplished 12 months ahead of schedule, and about $20 million under budget. This is an important milestone toward the testing of new nuclear fuel, which is expected to begin in 2018.

== Completion of first fueled experiment ==
On September 18, 2018, TREAT completed the first experiment with a small sample of light water reactor fuel. This was a very significant milestone for the TREAT reactor, and is a major step toward one mission of TREAT, validating new accident tolerant nuclear fuel for commercial power plants. The senior Senator from Idaho, Senator Mike Crapo, read the statement below into the Congressional Record.

RECOGNIZING THE TRANSIENT REACTOR TEST FACILITY RESTART

Mr. CRAPO. Mr. President, along with my colleagues Senator James Risch and Representative Mike Simpson, today I wish to call attention to an important event taking place today at the U.S. Department of Energy's, DOE, 890-square-mile site in Idaho. Today, Idaho National Laboratory, INL, personnel ran the first experiments in the Transient Reactor Test, TREAT, facility in nearly a quarter century.

Idaho National Laboratory is our Nation's lead nuclear energy research, development, and demonstration laboratory, the place where 52 original nuclear reactors were constructed and demonstrated. One of those reactors was the TREAT facility, which operated from 1959-1994, and remained fully fueled while on standby status. Transient testing focuses upon testing nuclear fuel under accident conditions. TREAT is one of the most capable and flexible transient test reactors in the world.
Following the accident at the Fukushima-Daiichi Power Plant in Japan 11 years ago, Congress directed the DOE to develop reactor fuels that could better withstand accident conditions. During TREAT's 35 operating years, the reactor performed 6,604 reactor startups and 2,884 transient irradiations. Given this history, it made more sense to restart the facility than build a new reactor. That decision paid off when, on August 31, 2017, the Resumption of Transient Testing Program was completed more than 1 year ahead of schedule and approximately $17 million under budget.
This highly successful restart at the TREAT facility was recognized in August, when a joint DOE-INL team won the Secretary of Energy Award. This award recognizes DOE employees or contractors who accomplish significant achievements. It is the highest nonmonetary internal recognition that can be achieved at the DOE. U.S. Secretary of Energy Rick Perry highlighted the TREAT restart team's effort and efficiency, and recognized the importance of the facility to nuclear energy scientists and engineers as they work to develop advanced nuclear fuels and reactor technologies.
Congratulations, INL and DOE, on the TREAT restart and for bringing back online an important national asset in the effort to develop the advanced nuclear reactors so vital to our economy, environment, and national security.

== American Nuclear Society Historic Landmark Designation ==
On March 4, 2019 the American Nuclear Society presented the Idaho National Laboratory (INL) Transient Test Reactor (TREAT) with the ANS Nuclear Historic Landmark Award for the dynamic and groundbreaking research it has performed in testing nuclear fuels and materials under accident conditions.

== General reference ==
Stacy, Susan M. (2000) Proving the Principle: A History of the Idaho National Engineering and Environmental Laboratory, 1949–1999. United States Government Printing. pp. 136, 268. ISBN 0-16-059185-6.
