= Absorption hardening =

In the field of nuclear engineering, absorption hardening is the increase in average energy of neutrons in a population by preferential absorption of lower-energy neutrons. This occurs because absorption cross-sections typically increase for lower neutron energies.
