= Obninsk Nuclear Power Plant =

Nuclear power plant in Obninsk, Russia (operates 1954–2002)

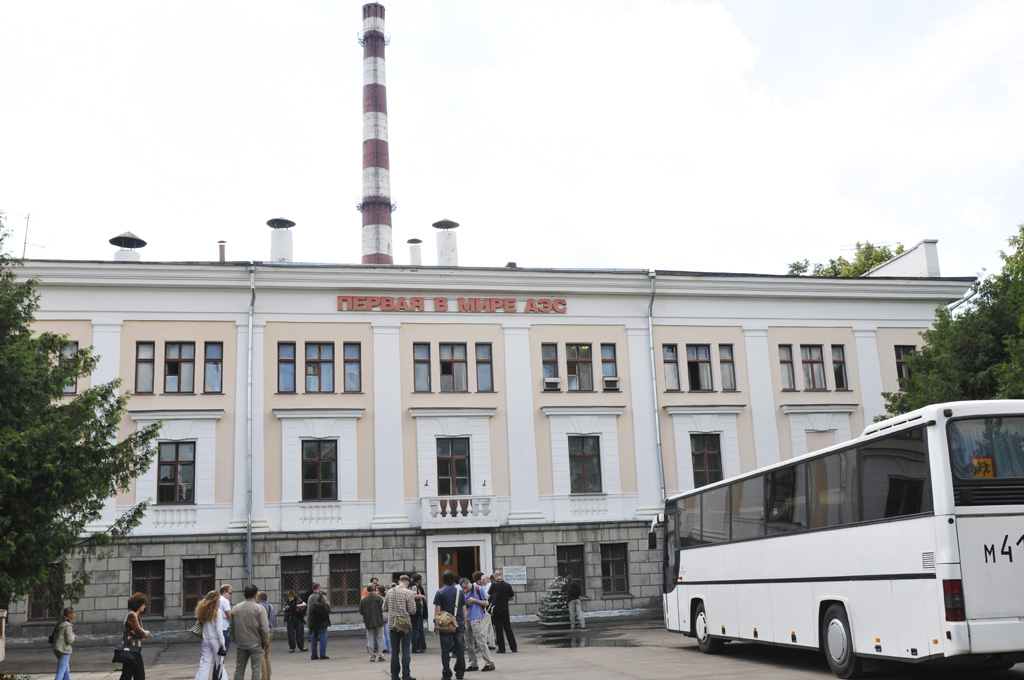
- Obninsk Nuclear Power Plant Museum
- Country: Russia
- Location: Obninsk, Kaluga Oblast
- Coordinates: 55°05′02″N 36°34′17″E
- Status: Decommissioned
- Construction began: 1 January 1951
- Commission date: 26 June 1954
- Decommission date: 29 April 2002
- Owner: Rosatom
- Operator: Energoatom

Nuclear power station
- Reactor type: AM-1
- Cogeneration?: Yes

Power generation
- Units decommissioned: 1 × 5 MW
- Nameplate capacity: 5 MW

External links
- Website: aes1.ru
- Commons: Related media on Commons

Obninsk Nuclear Power Plant (Russian: Обнинская АЭС, romanized: Obninskaya AES;) was built in the "Science City" of Obninsk, Kaluga Oblast, about 110 km (68 mi) southwest of Moscow, Soviet Union. Connected to the power grid in June 1954, Obninsk was the first grid-connected nuclear power plant in the world, i.e. the first nuclear reactor that produced electricity industrially, albeit at small scale. It was located at the Institute of Physics and Power Engineering. The plant is also known as APS-1 Obninsk (Atomic Power Station 1 Obninsk). It remained in operation between 1954 and 2002. Its production of electricity for the grid ceased in 2002; thereafter it functioned as a research and isotope production plant only. Afterwards, it became the first nuclear power plant in Russia to halt operations.

According to Lev Kotchetkov, who was there at the time: "Although utilisation of generated heat was going on, and production of isotopes was even enhanced, the main task was to carry out experimental studies on 17 test loops installed in the reactor." The technology perfected in the Obninsk pilot plant was later employed on a much larger scale in the RBMK reactors.

== Design ==
The single reactor unit at the plant, AM-1 ("Атом Мирный", Atom Mirny, Russian for "Peaceful Atom"), had a total electrical capacity of 6 MW and a net capacity of around 5 MWe. Thermal output was 30 MW. It was a prototype design using a graphite moderator and water coolant. This reactor was a forerunner of the RBMK reactors.

The Obninsk reactor used 5% enriched uranium; this percentage would be lowered for subsequent reactors.

== History ==
Construction started on 31 December 1950. First criticality was achieved on 2 May 1954, and the first grid connection was made on 27 June 1954. For around four years, until the opening of the Siberian Nuclear Power Station, Obninsk remained the only nuclear power reactor in the Soviet Union; the power plant remained active until 29 April 2002 when it was finally shut down. According to Kotchetkov, in its 48 years of operation there were no significant incidents resulting in personnel overdose or mortality, or radioactive release to the environment exceeding permissible limits.

The next Soviet nuclear power plant to be connected to their grid was Beloyarsk Unit 1 in 1964 with a capacity of 100 MWe.

== See also ==
- BORAX III was briefly connected to the US power grid in 1955
- Experimental Breeder Reactor I – World's first nuclear power plant (powered its own building, but was not grid-connected)
- F-1 (nuclear reactor) (the Soviet equivalent of Chicago Pile 1)
- Magnox reactor prototypes at Calder Hall (1956) produced electricity although their main purpose was plutonium production
- Nuclear power in Russia
- Shippingport Atomic Power Station (1957) with 60 MWe power; it is described by the US government as the first full-scale nuclear power plant
