= Graphite-moderated reactor =

Type of nuclear reactor

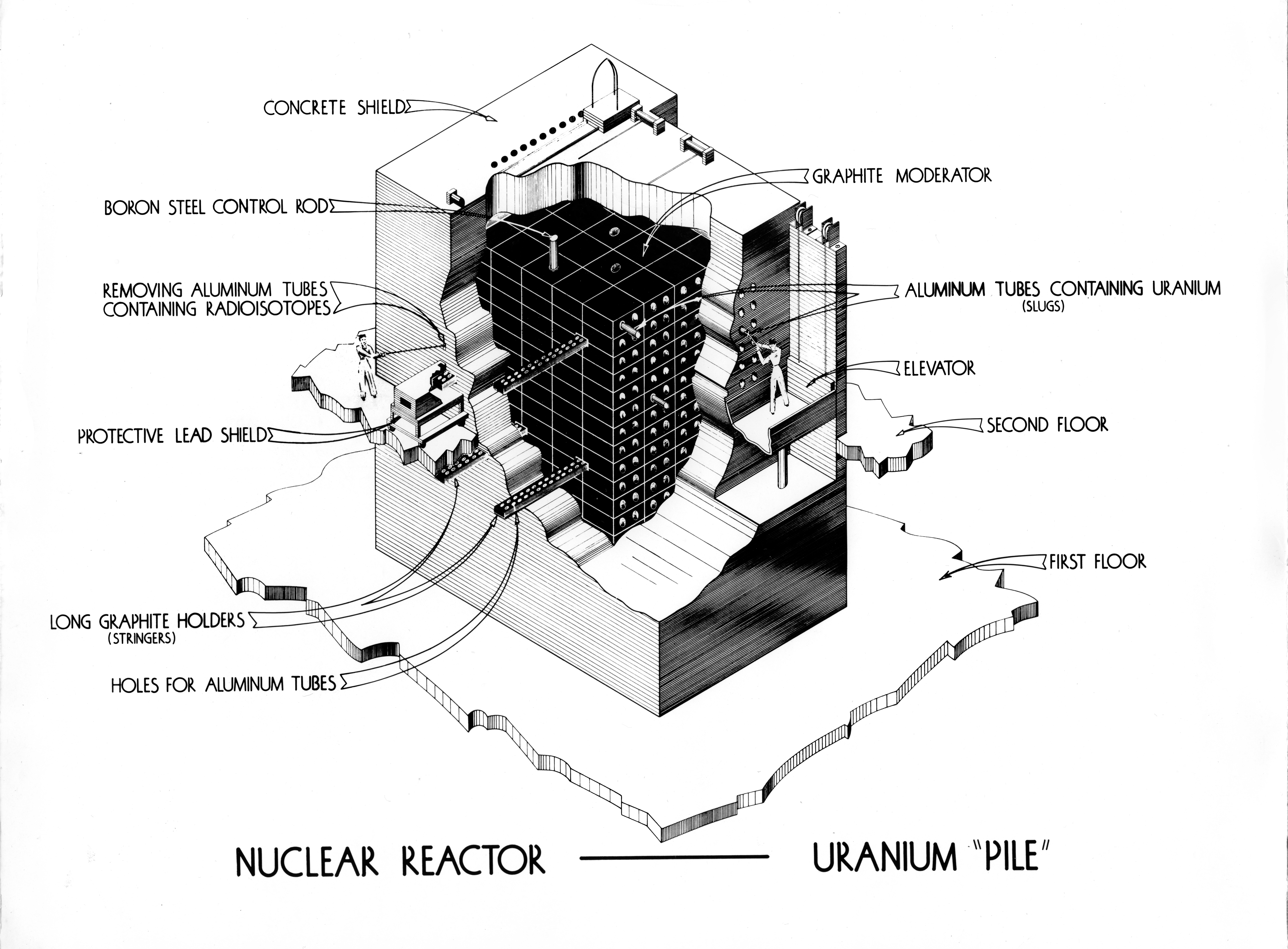
Diagram of a nuclear reactor using graphite as a moderator

"Graphite reactor" directs here. For the graphite reactor at Oak Ridge National Laboratory, see X-10 Graphite Reactor.

A graphite-moderated reactor is a nuclear reactor that uses carbon as a neutron moderator, which allows natural uranium to be used as nuclear fuel.

The first artificial nuclear reactor, the Chicago Pile-1, used nuclear graphite as a moderator. Graphite-moderated reactors were involved in two of the best-known nuclear disasters: an untested graphite annealing process contributed to the Windscale fire (but the graphite itself did not catch fire), while a graphite fire during the Chernobyl disaster contributed to the spread of radioactive material.

== Types ==
Several types of graphite-moderated nuclear reactors have been used in commercial electricity generation:

- Gas-cooled reactors
  - Magnox
  - UNGG reactor
  - Advanced gas-cooled reactor (AGR)
- Water-cooled reactors
  - RBMK
  - MKER
  - EGP-6
  - Hanford N-Reactor (dual use)
  - ADE-2 (dual use)
- High-temperature gas-cooled reactors (past)
  - Dragon reactor
  - AVR
  - Peach Bottom Unit 1
  - THTR-300
  - Fort St. Vrain Generating Station
- High temperature gas-cooled reactors (in development or construction)
  - Pebble-bed reactor
  - Very high temperature reactor
  - Prismatic fuel reactor
  - UHTREX Ultra-high-temperature reactor experiment
- Other
  - Molten salt reactor

== Research reactors ==
There have been a number of research or test reactors built that use graphite as the moderator.

- Chicago Pile-1
- Chicago Pile-2
- Transient Reactor Test Facility (TREAT)
- Molten Salt Reactor Experiment (MSRE)

== History ==
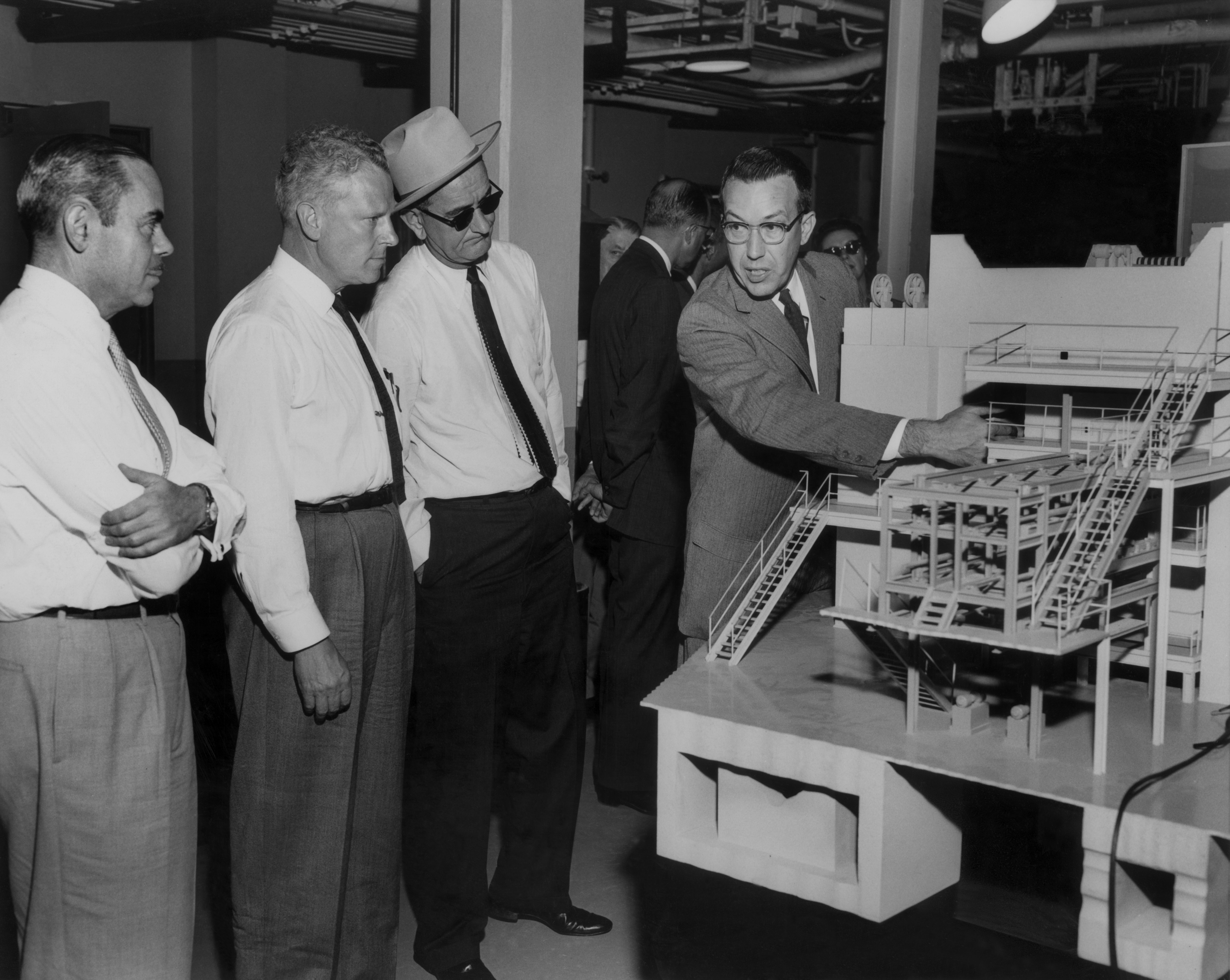
S.R. Sapirie, Senator Albert Gore Sr, Senator Lyndon Johnson and Dr. John Swartout looking at a model of a graphite reactor at Oak Ridge National Lab, on October 19, 1958.

The first artificial nuclear reactor, Chicago Pile-1, a graphite-moderated device that produced between 0.5 watts and 200 watts, was constructed by a team led by Enrico Fermi in 1942. The construction and testing of this reactor (an "atomic pile") was part of the Manhattan Project. This work led to the construction of the X-10 Graphite Reactor at Oak Ridge National Laboratory, which was the first nuclear reactor designed and built for continuous operation, and began operation in 1943.

=== Accidents ===
There have been several major accidents in graphite-moderated reactors, with the Windscale fire and the Chernobyl disaster probably the best known.

In the Windscale fire, an untested annealing process for the graphite was used, and that contributed to the accident – however it was the uranium fuel rather than the graphite in the reactor that caught fire. The only graphite moderator damage was found to be localized around burning fuel elements.

In the Chernobyl disaster, the graphite was a contributing factor to the cause of the accident. Due to overheating from lack of adequate cooling, the fuel rods began to deteriorate. After the SCRAM (AZ5) button was pressed to shut down the reactor, the control rods jammed in the middle of the core, causing a positive loop, since the nuclear fuel reacted to graphite. This has been dubbed the "final trigger" of events before the rupture. A graphite fire after the main event contributed to the spread of radioactive material. The massive power excursion in Chernobyl during a mishandled test led to the rupture of the reactor vessel and a series of steam explosions, which destroyed the reactor building. Now exposed to both air and the heat from the reactor core, the graphite moderator in the reactor core caught fire, and this fire sent a plume of highly radioactive fallout into the atmosphere and over an extensive geographical area.

In addition, the French Saint-Laurent Nuclear Power Plant and the Spanish Vandellòs Nuclear Power Plant – both UNGG graphite-moderated natural uranium reactors – suffered major accidents. Particularly noteworthy is a partial core meltdown on 17 October 1969 and a heat excursion during graphite annealing on 13 March 1980 in Saint-Laurent, which were both classified as INES 4. The Vandellòs NPP was damaged on 19 October 1989, and a repair was considered uneconomical.
