= Radiation-enhanced diffusion =

Radiation-enhanced diffusion is a phenomenon in radiation material science, wherein the presence of radiation accelerates the diffusion of atoms or ions within a material. The effect arises because of the creation of defects in the crystal lattice, such as vacancies or interstitials, by the radiation.
