= Sibirskaya Nuclear Power Plant =

First industrial-scale nuclear power plant built in the USSR

Siberian Nuclear Power Plant
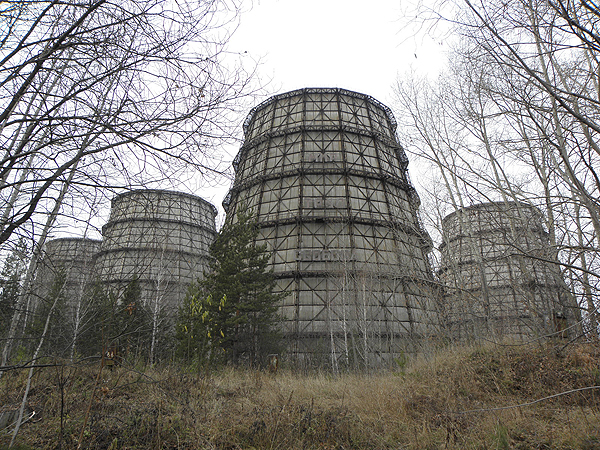
- Cooling towers of the Siberian Nuclear Power Plant
- Country: Russia
- Location: Seversk
- Coordinates: 56°37′37″N 84°54′19″E
- Status: Decommissioned
- Construction began: 1954
- Commission date: December 1958
- Decommission date: 2008
- Owner: Rosatom
- Operator: Energoatom

Nuclear power station
- Reactor type: ADE

Power generation
- Units decommissioned: I-1, EI-2, ADE-3, ADE-4, ADE-5
- Nameplate capacity: 600 MW

External links
- Commons: Related media on Commons

The Siberian Nuclear Power Plant (Sibirskaya Nuclear Power Plant) was built in the city of Seversk (then known as Tomsk-7), Tomsk Oblast. It was the second nuclear power plant in the USSR and the first industrial-scale nuclear power plant in the country (the first NPP, built in Obninsk, had a capacity of only 6 MW). While the Siberian Nuclear Power Plant did produce electricity and supply district heating to Seversk and a part of Tomsk, the primary product was weapons-grade plutonium for the Soviet Union's nuclear weapons program.
