= Kathleen Gilje =

American artist

Kathleen Gilje (born 1945) is an American art restorer and artist. She is best known for her appropriations of Old Master Paintings which combine their historical provenance with contemporary ideas and perspective.

== Early life and education ==
Gilje was born in Bay Ridge, Brooklyn. She received her BFA from the City College of New York and trained as a conservator from 1967 to 1971 at the Museo di Capodimonte in Naples, Italy. Gilje apprenticed in Rome with the restorer of antique paintings, Antonio de Mata, from 1966 to 1968. Gilje continued her apprenticeship from 1968 to 1972 at the Museo di Capodimonte in Naples.

== Career ==
=== Restoration ===
In 1973, she returned to New York and worked in the conservation studio of Marco Grassi, where she restored Old Master paintings for private and museum clients, including Stanley Moss, E.V. Thaw, Robert Dance, the Metropolitan Museum of Art in New York, the Norton Simon Collection in Pasadena, and the Thyssen-Bornemisza Collection. In 1976, she opened her own studio. During this period, she also created artistic works, initially relief sculptures and then paintings, which were exhibited in various SoHo galleries. Gilje began to combine her knowledge of conservation with her own paintings in the early 1990s.

=== Revised and restored ===
La Donna Velata

In 1995, Kathleen Gilje created La Donna Velata, Restored (oil on canvas). The painting formed from Raphael's La donna velata (1516) is one of three portraits of his lifelong Roman mistress Margarita Luti. Contrary to Raphael's painting which captivates its well-balanced composition, through the opulent white and gold gown, and sheer veil framing the woman's face, Gilje's version is staggeringly different by adding a black eye to the woman's gentle face as a bold representation of the timelessness of gender, power, and violence against women. Gilje explains with La Donna Velata, Restored she was moved by a story from her daughter telling her how a classmate was killed by her father and then later a book which showed a picture of the victim. Most of the time when she addresses important issues in her art they are individual incidents. Each of the pieces Gilje creates is prompted by an individual story, not an agenda.

=== Alternative readings ===
In her paintings, drawings and installations, Gilje applies an art historical analysis and uses methodologies of conservation to create altered versions of familiar paintings which suggest alternative interpretations of the original artworks. In this way, she encourages her audience to think about a work of art on several levels: its material and historical narrative. An example of this is Rembrandt's Danaë defaced by a vandal with acid in the Hermitage, its contemporary symbolism translated into up-to-date equivalents; another is Caravaggio's Boy Bitten by a Lizard, Restored, 1992, where the lizard is replaced by a syringe, suggesting a link to the risk of AIDS.

Many of her paintings engage with feminist issues, although they are sometimes controversial (as in her series of "Sargent's Women," portraying 48 women visually excised from paintings by John Singer Sargent, all rendered without their luxurious clothing). In Susanna and the Elders, Restored, 1998, Gilje exhibits a recreation of Artemisia Gentileschi's Susanna and the Elders (a story of sexual abuse) hanging next to an x-ray of the painting. When Gilje recreated Gentileschi's painting, she made an underpainting in lead white (lead white x-rays well) of Gentileschi's own rape by Agostino Tassi. In the x-ray we see Gentileschi's arm extended holding a knife in self-defense and her face contorted and screaming. The image can faintly be seen in the pentimento as well. Her references are provocative as she addresses timely social, political and personal concerns.

=== Portraits ===
Gilje created a number of portraits in which her subjects were placed in the context of an historic painting of their choice; these were displayed in her exhibition Curators and Connoisseur at Francis M. Naumann Fine Art, New York, in 2006. For example, art historian Linda Nochlin chose Édouard Manet's 1882 Bar at the Folies Bergère for Gilje's Linda Nochlin at the Bar at the Folies Bergere, 2006, and art historian Robert Rosenblum chose Ingres’ 1823/26 Comte de Pastoret for his Gilje portrait of 2005.

== Exhibitions and recognition ==
Over the course of the past twenty years, her work has been shown in various exhibitions throughout the United States and in Europe. Several critics and art historians have written about her work, including Robert Rosenblum, Linda Nochlin and John Yau.

Gilje's work is in the collection of several museums, including the Weatherspoon Museum, University of North Carolina, Greensboro, North Carolina, National Museum of Women in the Arts, Washington, D.C., Yale University Art Gallery, New Haven, Connecticut, The National Portrait Gallery, Smithsonian Institution, Washington, D.C., Musée Ingres, Louvre Museum, Montauban, France, Bass Museum, Miami, Florida, the Williams College Museum of Art, Williamstown, Addison Gallery of American Art and Phillips Academy, Andover, Massachusetts.
