= Unsharpness =

Loss of spatial resolution in a radiographic image

In medical imaging, unsharpness is the loss of spatial resolution in a radiographic image. There are generally considered to be three types of unsharpness: geometric unsharpness, motion unsharpness and photographic or system unsharpness.

Motion unsharpness is caused by movement of the patient, the detector, or the source of X-rays during the exposure. Movement of the patient, either voluntary or otherwise, is the most common cause and this can be minimised in a number of ways: immobilizing the patient, asking the patient to keep still or to hold their breath and keeping exposure time short, and thereby giving them less time in which to move, are the most obvious.

System unsharpness (previously called photographic unsharpness) is the result of the detector system employed. Every detector type has a limiting factor which determines its maximum spatial resolution. In film systems, it is the size of the grains of photographic chemical. In computed radiography systems, it the size of the laser used to read the phosphor plate in the cassette reader. In digital radiography systems, it is the size of the individual thin film transistors. Since each type has a maximum capability, there is no way to minimise this system other than using a better and probably more expensive machine.

Geometric unsharpness is caused by aspects of the geometry of the X-ray beam. Two principal factors play simultaneously: the apparent focal spot size and the ratio between object-film distance (OFD) and focus-film distance (FFD). Fine focal spot sizes will minimise geometric unsharpness, and therefore give more detailed images, but it is often impossible to employ them due to the tube loading necessary in the exposure. Keeping the ratio FFD:OFD high will minimise geometric unsharpness. This is most easily done by keeping the OFD to a minimum, i.e., keeping the part of the body being X-rayed as close to the detector as possible. If this is not possible however, then increasing FFD beyond the normal 100–110 cm will be necessary to keep the unsharpness level acceptable.
