= Neutron temperature =

Kinetic energy of an unbound neutron

The neutron detection temperature, also called the neutron energy, indicates a free neutron's kinetic energy, usually given in electron volts. The term temperature is used, since hot, thermal and cold neutrons are moderated in a medium with a certain temperature. The neutron energy distribution is then adapted to the Maxwell distribution known for thermal motion. Qualitatively, the higher the temperature, the higher the kinetic energy of the free neutrons. The momentum and wavelength of the neutron are related through the de Broglie relation. The long wavelength of slow neutrons allows for the large cross section.

== Neutron energy distribution ranges ==
The precise boundaries of neutron energy ranges are not well defined, and differ between sources, but some common names and limits are given in the following table.

Neutron energy range names
Neutron energy	Neutron wavelength	Energy range	Production	Usage	Notes
10^{−7}eV	> 500 Å	Ultracold neutrons	Moderation by liquid helium or solid deuterium	Neutron optics, lifetime, electric dipole moment, condensed matter research	Storage times >15 minutes in bottles.
0.0 – 25 meV	≈ 2 - 6 Å	Cold (slow) neutrons	Moderation by liquid deuterium, liquid para-hydrogen or solid methane	Neutron scattering	
25 meV	≈ 1.8 Å	Thermal neutrons (at 20 °C)	Room temperature moderators	Nuclear fission reactors, transmutation, breeding blankets	Room temperature
25 meV–0.4 eV	≈ 1.8 - 0.45 Å	Epithermal neutrons	Reduced moderation		Above room temperature
10–300 eV	≈ 0.09 - 0.016 Å	Resonance neutrons			Susceptible to non-fission capture by ^{238}U.
1–20 MeV	≈ 900 - 200 fm	Fast neutrons	Nuclear fission reactions, nuclear fusion reactions	Fast reactors, transuranium burnup, breeding blankets, neutron bombs	
> 20 MeV	< 100 fm	Ultrafast neutrons	Nuclear spallation from particle accelerator ions	Fast neutron therapy, fission research	Relativistic

The following is a detailed classification:

=== Thermal ===
A thermal neutron is a free neutron with a kinetic energy of about 0.025 eV (about 4.0×10^{−21} J or 2.4 MJ/kg, hence a speed of ≈2.19 km/s), which is the energy corresponding to the most probable speed at a temperature of ≈290 K (≈17 °C or ≈62 °F), the most probable energy of the thermal neutron flux at this temperature, E_{peak} = k T.

After a number of collisions with nuclei (scattering) in a medium (neutron moderator) at this temperature, those neutrons which are not absorbed reach about this energy level.

Thermal neutrons have a different and sometimes much larger effective neutron absorption cross-section for a given nuclide than fast neutrons, and can therefore often be absorbed more easily by an atomic nucleus, creating a heavier, often unstable isotope of the chemical element as a result, since most nuclides follow a 1/v absorption law in the thermal region. This event is called neutron activation.

=== Epithermal ===
Epithermal neutrons are those with energies above the thermal energy at room temperature (i.e. 0.025 eV). Depending on the context, this can encompass all energies up to fast neutrons (as in e.g.).

This includes neutrons produced by conversion of accelerated protons in a pitcher-catcher geometry

=== Cold (slow) neutrons ===
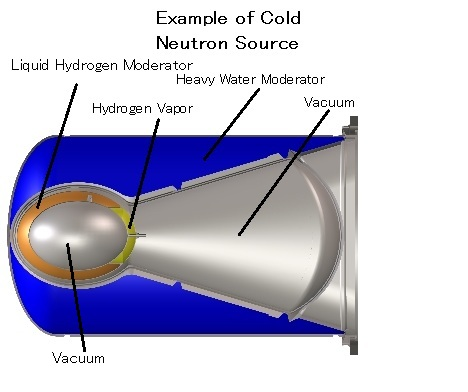
Cold neutron source providing neutrons at about the temperature of liquid hydrogen

Cold neutrons are thermal neutrons that have been equilibrated in a very cold substance such as liquid deuterium. Such a cold source is placed in the moderator of a research reactor or spallation source. Cold neutrons are particularly valuable for neutron scattering experiments.

Ultracold neutrons are produced by inelastic scattering of cold neutrons in substances with a low neutron absorption cross section at a temperature of a few kelvins, such as solid deuterium or superfluid helium. An alternative production method is the mechanical deceleration of cold neutrons exploiting the Doppler shift.

Ultra-cold neutrons reflect at all angles of incidence. This is because their momentum is comparable to the optical potential of materials. This effect is used to store them in bottles and study their fundamental properties e.g. lifetime, neutron electrical-dipole moment etc... The main limitations of the use of slow neutrons is the low flux and the lack of efficient optical devices (in the case of CN and VCN). Efficient neutron optical components are being developed and optimized to remedy this lack.

=== Fast ===
A fast neutron is a free neutron with a kinetic energy level close to 1 MeV (100 TJ/kg), hence a speed of 14,000 km/s or higher. They are named fast neutrons to distinguish them from lower-energy thermal neutrons, and high-energy neutrons produced in cosmic showers or accelerators. Fast neutrons are produced by nuclear processes:

- Nuclear fission: thermal fission of ^{235}U produces neutrons with a mean energy of 2 MeV (200 TJ/kg, i.e. 20,000 km/s), which qualifies as "fast". However, the energy spectrum of these neutrons approximately follows a right-skewed Watt distribution $N(E) \propto \exp(-aE) \sinh(\sqrt{bE})$, with a range of 0 to about 17 MeV, a median of 1.6 MeV, and a mode of 0.75 MeV. A significant proportion of fission neutrons do not qualify as "fast" even by the 1 MeV criterion.
- Spontaneous fission is a mode of radioactive decay for some heavy nuclides. Examples include plutonium-240 and californium-252.
- Nuclear fusion: deuterium–tritium fusion produces neutrons of 14.1 MeV (1400 TJ/kg, i.e. 52,000 km/s, 17.3% of the speed of light) that can easily fission uranium-238 and other non-fissile actinides.
- Neutron emission occurs in situations in which a nucleus contains enough excess neutrons that the separation energy of one or more neutrons becomes negative (i.e. excess neutrons "drip" out of the nucleus). Unstable nuclei of this sort will often decay in less than one second.

Fast neutrons are usually undesirable in a steady-state nuclear reactor because most fissile fuel has a higher reaction rate with thermal neutrons. Fast neutrons can be rapidly changed into thermal neutrons via a process called moderation. This is done through numerous collisions with (in general) slower-moving and thus lower-temperature particles like atomic nuclei and other neutrons. These collisions will generally speed up the other particle and slow down the neutron and scatter it. Ideally, a room temperature neutron moderator is used for this process. In reactors, heavy water, light water, or graphite are typically used to moderate neutrons.

A chart displaying the speed probability density functions of the speeds of a few noble gases at a temperature of 298.15 K (25 C). An explanation of the vertical axis label appears on the image page. Similar speed distributions are obtained for neutrons upon moderation.

=== Fission energy neutrons ===
A fast neutron is a free neutron with a kinetic energy level close to 1 MeV (1.6×10^{−13} J), hence a speed of ~14000 km/s (~ 5% of the speed of light). They are named fission energy or fast neutrons to distinguish them from lower-energy thermal neutrons, and high-energy neutrons produced in cosmic showers or accelerators. Fast neutrons are produced by nuclear processes such as nuclear fission. Neutrons produced in fission, as noted above, have a Watt distribution of kinetic energies, with almost all neutrons between 0.1 and 10 MeV, a mean energy of 2 MeV (for ^{235}U fission neutrons), and a mode of only 0.75 MeV, so that a significant fraction of them do not qualify as fast (and thus have almost no chance of initiating fission in fertile materials, such as ^{238}U and ^{232}Th).

Fast neutrons can be made into thermal neutrons via a process called moderation. This is done with a neutron moderator. In reactors, typically heavy water, light water, or graphite are used to moderate neutrons.

=== Fusion neutrons ===
The fusion reaction rate increases rapidly with temperature until it maximizes and then gradually drops off. The D–T rate peaks at a lower temperature (about 70 keV, or 800 million kelvins) and at a higher value than other reactions commonly considered for fusion energy.

D–T (deuterium–tritium) fusion is the fusion reaction that produces the most energetic neutrons, with 14.1 MeV of kinetic energy and traveling at 17% of the speed of light. D–T fusion is also the easiest fusion reaction to ignite, reaching near-peak rates even when the deuterium and tritium nuclei have only a thousandth as much kinetic energy as the 14.1 MeV that will be produced.

14.1 MeV neutrons have about 10 times as much energy as fission neutrons, and they are very effective at fissioning even non-fissile heavy nuclei. These high-energy fissions also produce more neutrons on average than fissions by lower-energy neutrons. D–T fusion neutron sources, such as proposed tokamak power reactors, are therefore useful for transmutation of transuranic waste. 14.1 MeV neutrons can also produce neutrons by knocking them loose from nuclei.

On the other hand, these very high-energy neutrons are less likely to simply be captured without causing fission or spallation. For these reasons, nuclear weapon design extensively uses D–T fusion 14.1 MeV neutrons to cause more fission. Fusion neutrons are able to cause fission in ordinarily non-fissile materials, such as depleted uranium (uranium-238), and these materials have been used in the jackets of thermonuclear weapons. Fusion neutrons also can cause fission in substances that are unsuitable or difficult to make into primary fission bombs, such as reactor grade plutonium. This physical fact thus causes ordinary non-weapons grade materials to become of concern in certain nuclear proliferation discussions and treaties.

Other fusion reactions produce much less energetic neutrons. D–D fusion produces a 2.45 MeV neutron and helium-3 half of the time and produces tritium and a proton but no neutron the rest of the time. D–^{3}He fusion produces no neutron.

=== Intermediate-energy neutrons ===
Transmutation flow in light water reactor, which is a thermal-spectrum reactor

A fission energy neutron that has slowed down but not yet reached thermal energies is called an epithermal neutron.

Cross sections for both capture and fission reactions often have multiple resonance peaks at specific energies in the epithermal energy range. These are of less significance in a fast-neutron reactor, where most neutrons are absorbed before slowing down to this range. They are of less significance in a well-moderated thermal reactor, where epithermal neutrons interact mostly with moderator nuclei, not with either fissile or fertile actinide nuclides. But in a partially moderated reactor with more interactions of epithermal neutrons with heavy metal nuclei, there are greater possibilities for transient changes in reactivity that might make reactor control more difficult.

Ratios of capture reactions to fission reactions are also worse (more captures without fission) in most nuclear fuels such as plutonium-239, making epithermal-spectrum reactors using these fuels less desirable, as captures not only waste the one neutron captured but also usually result in a nuclide that is not fissile with thermal or epithermal neutrons, though still fissionable with fast neutrons. The exception is uranium-233 of the thorium cycle, which has the lowest capture-to-fission ratio of the principal fissile nuclides in both thermal and epithermal spectra.

=== High-energy neutrons ===
High-energy neutrons have much more energy than fission energy neutrons and are generated as secondary particles by particle accelerators or in the atmosphere from cosmic rays. These high-energy neutrons are extremely efficient at ionization and far more likely to cause cell death than X-rays or protons.

== Fast-neutron reactor and thermal-neutron reactor compared ==
Most fission reactors are thermal-neutron reactors that use a neutron moderator to slow down ("thermalize") the neutrons produced by nuclear fission. Moderation substantially increases the fission cross section for fissile nuclei such as uranium-235 or plutonium-239. In addition, uranium-238's capture cross section for thermal neutrons is much smaller than the fission cross sections of fissile nuclei, allowing more neutrons to cause fission and propagate the chain reaction, rather than being captured by ^{238}U. The combination of these effects allows light water reactors to use low-enriched uranium. Heavy water reactors and graphite-moderated reactors can even use natural uranium as these moderators have much lower neutron capture cross sections than light water.

An increase in fuel temperature also broadens uranium-238's absorption resonances in the epithermal energy range (Doppler broadening), so that more neutrons are captured during slowing down, providing negative feedback to help control the reactor. When the coolant is a liquid that also contributes to moderation and absorption (light water or heavy water), boiling of the coolant will reduce the moderator density, which can provide positive or negative feedback (a positive or negative void coefficient), depending on whether the reactor is under- or over-moderated.

Intermediate-energy neutrons have poorer fission/capture ratios than either fast or thermal neutrons for most fuels. An exception is the uranium-233 of the thorium cycle, which has a good fission/capture ratio at all neutron energies.

Fast-neutron reactors use unmoderated fast neutrons to sustain the reaction, and require the fuel to contain a higher concentration of fissile material relative to fertile material (uranium-238). However, fast neutrons have a better fission/capture ratio for many nuclides, and each fast fission releases a larger number of neutrons, so a fast breeder reactor can potentially "breed" more fissile fuel than it consumes.

Fast reactor control cannot depend solely on Doppler broadening or on negative void coefficient from a moderator. However, thermal expansion of the fuel itself can provide quick negative feedback. Perennially expected to be the wave of the future, fast reactor development has been nearly dormant with only a handful of reactors built in the decades since the Chernobyl accident due to low prices in the uranium market, although there is now a revival with several Asian countries planning to complete larger prototype fast reactors in the next few years.

== See also ==
- Absorption hardening
- List of particles
- Neutron detection
- Neutron source
- Nuclear reaction
- Scintillator
