= Neutron imaging =

Process of making an image with neutrons

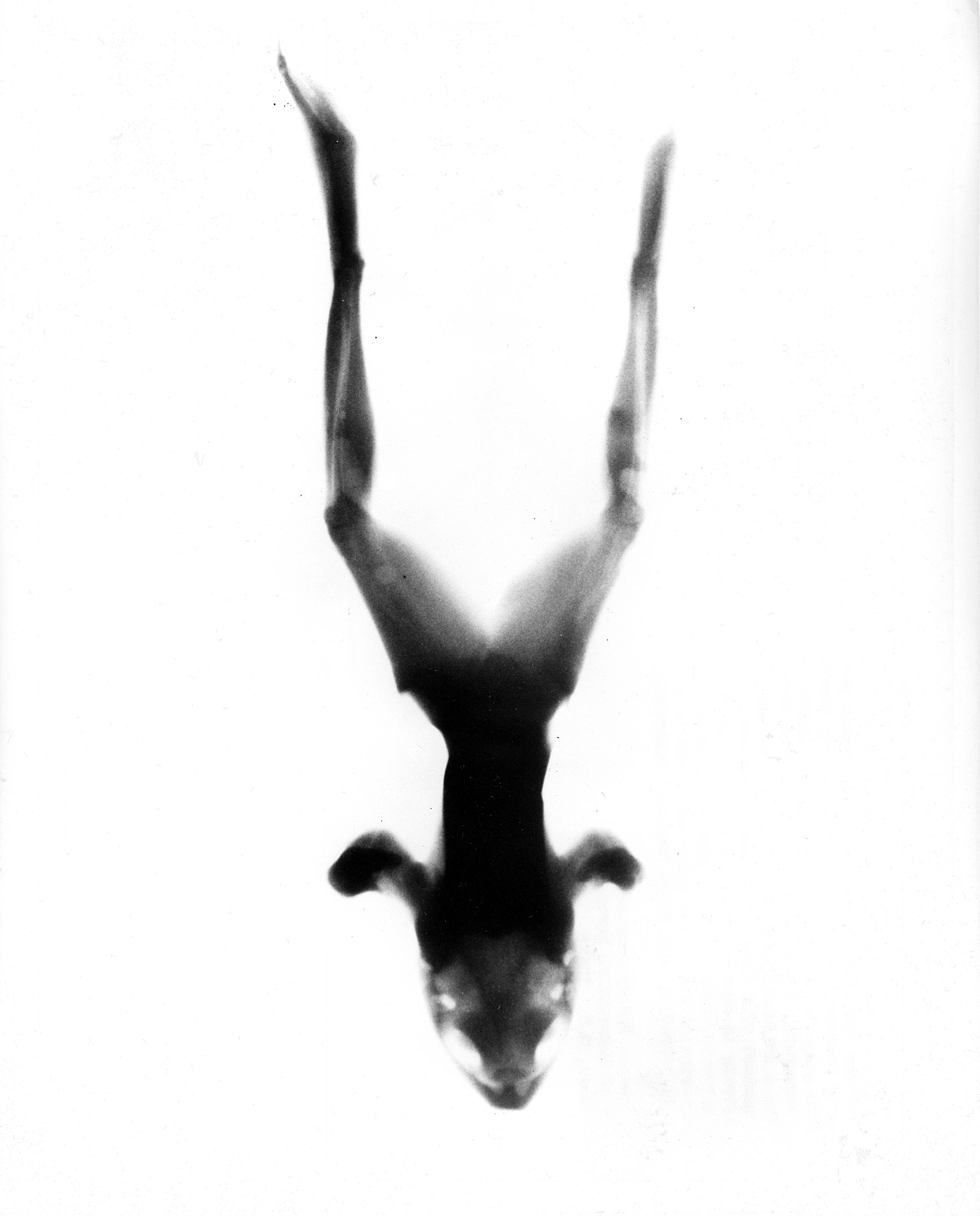
Image produced by the Oak Ridge National Laboratory's neutron radiography facility .

Neutron imaging is the process of making an image with neutrons. The resulting image is based on the neutron attenuation properties of the imaged object. The resulting images have much in common with industrial X-ray images, but since the image is based on neutron attenuating properties instead of X-ray attenuation properties, some things easily visible with neutron imaging may be very challenging or impossible to see with X-ray imaging techniques (and vice versa).

X-rays are attenuated based on a material's density. Denser materials will stop more X-rays. With neutrons, a material's likelihood of attenuation of neutrons is not related to its density. Some light materials such as boron will absorb neutrons while hydrogen will generally scatter neutrons, and many commonly used metals allow most neutrons to pass through them. This can make neutron imaging better suited in many instances than X-ray imaging; for example, looking at O-ring position and integrity inside of metal components, such as the segments joints of a Solid Rocket Booster.

== History ==
The neutron was discovered by James Chadwick in 1932. The first demonstration of neutron radiography was made by Hartmut Kallmann and E. Kuhn in the late 1930s. They discovered that upon bombardment with neutrons, some materials emitted radiation that could expose film. The discovery remained a curiosity until 1946 when low quality radiographs were made by Peters. The first neutron radiographs of reasonable quality were made by J. Thewlis (UK) in 1955.

Circa 1960, Harold Berger (US) and John P. Barton (UK) began evaluating neutrons for investigating irradiated reactor fuel. Subsequently, a number of research facilities were developed. The first commercial facilities came on-line in the late 1960s, mostly in the United States and France, and eventually in other countries including Canada, Japan, South Africa, Germany, and Switzerland.

== Process ==
To produce a neutron image, a source of neutrons, a collimator to shape the emitted neutrons into a fairly mono-directional beam, an object to be imaged, and some method of recording the image are required.

=== Neutron sources ===
Generally the neutron source is a research reactor, where a large number of neutrons per unit area (flux) is available. Some work with isotope sources of neutrons has been completed (largely spontaneous fission of Californium-252, but also Am-Be isotope sources, and others). These offer decreased capital costs and increased mobility, but at the expense of much lower neutron intensities and significantly lower image quality. Additionally, accelerator sources of neutrons have increased in availability, including large accelerators with spallation targets and these can be suitable sources for neutron imaging. Portable accelerator based neutron generators utilizing the neutron yielding fusion reactions of deuterium-deuterium or deuterium-tritium.

=== Moderation ===
After neutrons are produced, they need to be slowed down (decrease in kinetic energy), to the speed desired for imaging. This can take the form of some length of water, polyethylene, or graphite at room temperature to produce thermal neutrons. In the moderator the neutrons will collide with the nucleus of atoms and so slow down. Eventually the speed of these neutrons will achieve some distribution based on the temperature (amount of kinetic energy) of the moderator. If higher energy neutrons are desired, a graphite moderator can be heated to produce neutrons of higher energy (termed epithermal neutrons). For lower energy neutrons, a cold moderator such as liquid deuterium, can be used to produce low energy neutrons (cold neutron). If no or less moderator is present, high energy neutrons (termed fast neutrons), can be produced. The higher the temperature of the moderator, the higher the resulting kinetic energy of the neutrons is and the faster the neutrons will travel. Generally, faster neutrons will be more penetrating, but some interesting deviations from this trend exist and can sometimes be utilized in neutron imaging. Generally an imaging system is designed and set up to produce only a single energy of neutrons, with most imaging systems producing thermal or cold neutrons.

In some situations, selection of only a specific energy of neutrons may be desired. To isolate a specific energy of neutrons, scattering of neutrons from a crystal or chopping the neutron beam to separate neutrons based on their speed are options, but this generally produces very low neutron intensities and leads to very long exposures. Generally this is only carried out for research applications.

This discussion focuses on thermal neutron imaging, though much of this information applies to cold and epithermal imaging as well. Fast neutron imaging is an area of interest for homeland security applications, but is not commercially available currently and generally not described here.

=== Collimation ===
In the moderator, neutrons will be traveling in many different directions. To produce a good image, neutrons need to be traveling in a fairly uniform direction (generally slightly divergent). To accomplish this, an aperture (an opening that will allow neutrons to pass through it surrounded by neutron absorbing materials), limits the neutrons entering the collimator. Some length of collimator with neutron absorption materials (e.g. boron) then absorbs neutrons that are not traveling the length of the collimator in the desired direction. A tradeoff exists between image quality, and exposure time. A shorter collimation system or larger aperture will produce a more intense neutron beam but the neutrons will be traveling at a wider variety of angles, while a longer collimator or a smaller aperture will produce more uniformity in the direction of travel of the neutrons, but significantly fewer neutrons will be present and a longer exposure time will result.

=== Object ===
The object is placed in the neutron beam. Given increased geometric unsharpness from those found with X-ray systems, the object generally needs to be positioned as close to the image recording device as possible.

== Detection ==
A variety of methods are commonly employed to detect and record neutron images. Until recently, neutron imaging was generally recorded on X-ray film, but a variety of digital methods are now available.

=== Neutron conversion ===
Though numerous different image recording methods exist, neutrons are not generally easily measured and need to be converted into some other form of radiation that is more easily detected. Some form of conversion screen generally is employed to perform this task, though some image capture methods incorporate conversion materials directly into the image recorder. Often this takes the form of a thin layer of gadolinium, a very strong absorber for thermal neutrons. A 25 micrometer layer of gadolinium is sufficient to absorb 90% of the thermal neutrons incident on it. In some situations, other elements such as boron, indium, gold, or dysprosium may be used or materials such as LiF scintillation screens where the conversion screen absorbs neutrons and emits visible light.

=== Solid-state detectors ===
==== Film ====
Film is generally the highest resolution form of neutron imaging, though digital methods with ideal setups are recently achieving comparable results. The most frequently used approach uses a gadolinium conversion screen to convert neutrons into high energy electrons, that expose a single emulsion X-ray film.

The direct method is performed with the film present in the beamline, so neutrons are absorbed by the conversion screen which promptly emits some form of radiation that exposes the film. The indirect method does not have a film directly in the beamline. The conversion screen absorbs neutrons but some time delay exists prior to the release of radiation. Following recording the image on the conversion screen, the conversion screen is put in close contact with a film for a period of time (generally hours), to produce an image on the film. The indirect method has significant advantages when dealing with radioactive objects, or imaging systems with high gamma contamination, otherwise the direct method is generally preferred.

Neutron radiography is a commercially available service, widely used in the aerospace industry for the testing of turbine blades for airplane engines, components for space programs, high reliability explosives, and to a lesser extent in other industry to identify problems during product development cycles.

==== Track etch ====
Neutrons can be converted to ions that pass through a nuclear track detector made of plastic such as cellulose or CR-39. The ions produce trails of chemical damage called ion tracks. An acid bath is then used to etch the plastic, widening the tracks to holes that are visible under a microscope. It is also possible to use nuclear track detectors to detect neutrons without a conversion screen, as the neutrons can scatter nuclei in the plastic itself.

=== Digital detectors ===
Several processes for taking digital neutron images with thermal neutrons exists that have different advantages and disadvantages. These imaging methods are widely used in academic circles, in part because they avoid the need for film processors and dark rooms as well as offering a variety of advantages. Additionally film images can be digitized through the use of transmission scanners.

==== Neutron camera ====
A neutron camera is an imaging system based on a digital camera or similar detector array. Neutrons pass through the object to be imaged, then a scintillation screen converts the neutrons into visible light. This light then pass through some optics (intended to minimize the camera's exposure to ionizing radiation), then the image is captured by the CCD camera (several other camera types also exist, including CMOS and CID, producing similar results).

Neutron cameras allow real time images (generally with low resolution), which has proved useful for studying two phase fluid flow in opaque pipes, hydrogen bubble formation in fuel cells, and lubricant movement in engines. This imaging system in conjunction with a rotary table, can take a large number of images at different angles that can be reconstructed into a three-dimensional image (neutron tomography).

When coupled with a thin scintillation screen and good optics these systems can produce high resolution images with similar exposure times to film imaging, though the imaging plane typically must be small given the number of pixels on the available CCD camera chips.

Though these systems offer some significant advantages (the ability to perform real time imaging, simplicity and relative low cost for research application, potentially reasonably high resolution, prompt image viewing), significant disadvantages exist including dead pixels on the camera (which result from radiation exposure), gamma sensitivity of the scintillation screens (creating imaging artifacts that typically require median filtering to remove), limited field of view, and the limited lifetime of the cameras in the high radiation environments.

==== Imaging plates ====
Photostimulable phosphor plates used to detect X-rays can be used in conjunction with a laser scanner to produce neutron images much as X-ray images are produced with the system. The neutrons still need to be converted into some other form of radiation to be captured by the imaging plate. For a short time period, Fuji produced neutron sensitive imaging plates that contained a converter material in the plate and offered better resolution than is possible with an external conversion material.

Imaging plates offer a process that is very similar to film imaging, but the image is recorded on a reusable imaging plate that is read and cleared after imaging. These systems only produce still images. Using a conversion screen and an X-ray imaging plate, comparable exposure times are required to produce an image with lower resolution than film imaging. Imaging plates with embedded conversion material produce better images than those external conversion, but currently do not produce images of the same quality as film.

==== Flat panel silicon detectors ====
Flat panel silicon detectors are a digital technique similar to CCD imaging. Neutron exposure leads to short lifetimes of the detectors that has resulted in other digital techniques becoming preferred approaches.

==== Microchannel plates ====
Microchannel plates are an emerging type of digital detector with very small pixel sizes. The device has small (micrometer) channels through it, with the source side coated with a neutron absorbing material (generally gadolinium or boron). The neutron absorbing material absorbs neutrons and converts them into ionizing radiation that frees electrons. A large voltage is applied across the device, causing the freed electrons to be amplified as they are accelerated through the small channels then detected by a digital detector array.

== Applications ==
=== Air cargo scanning ===
A system to scan cargo containers using fast neutron and gamma-ray radiography was developed by the CSIRO and trialled at Brisbane Airport in 2005–2006. It used neutron generators and a gamma-ray source to produce collimated beams, with cargo containers passing on a chain conveyor belt through a tunnel, and scintillator neutron detectors and gamma ray detectors mounted in columns on the opposite side of the tunnel. Containers would take approximately 2 minutes to pass through the device.

Unlike X-ray scanning, which can detect metallic items such as firearms but has problems with other substances, fast neutron and gamma-ray radiography is sensitive to a wide range of materials. In addition, by measuring the ratios of neutron attenuation to gamma-ray attenuation, it is possible to analyse the elemental composition of scanned substances.

An upgraded version of the scanner, named the AC6015XN Air Cargo Scanner and co-developed by Nuctech and CSIRO, was developed and trialled in Beijing in 2009. The AC6015XN had a smaller footprint, different shielding, stereoscopic dual X-ray beams (produced by a linear accelerator) instead of gamma-ray beams, and X-ray detectors across both the side and the top of the tunnel. The radiation dosage from the neutron radiation was approximately 8 microsieverts (800 μrem) and was well below the limits set on food irradiation in countries such as the United Kingdom and the United States of America.
