= Iodine-131 =

Isotope of iodine

General
- Symbol: ^{131}I
- Names: iodine-131, radioiodine
- Protons (Z): 53
- Neutrons (N): 78

Nuclide data
- Half-life (t_{1/2}): 8.0249 d
- Isotope mass: 130.906126 Da
- Spin: 7/2+
- Decay products: ^{131}Xe

Decay modes
- Decay mode: Decay energy (MeV)
- β^{−} + γ: 0.971

Iodine-131 (^{131}I, I-131) is a radioisotope of iodine discovered by Glenn Seaborg and John Livingood in 1938 at the University of California, Berkeley. It has a radioactive decay half-life of about eight days. It is associated with nuclear energy, medical diagnostic and treatment procedures, and natural gas production. It also plays a major role as a radioactive isotope present in nuclear fission products, and was a significant contributor to the health hazards from open-air atomic bomb testing in the 1950s, and from the Chernobyl disaster, as well as being a large fraction of the contamination hazard in the first weeks in the Fukushima nuclear crisis. This is because ^{131}I is a major fission product of uranium and plutonium, comprising nearly 3% of the total products of fission (see fission product yield).

Due to its beta decay, iodine-131 causes mutation and death in cells that it penetrates, and other cells up to several millimeters away. For this reason, high doses of the isotope are sometimes less dangerous than low doses, since they tend to kill thyroid tissues that would otherwise become cancerous as a result of the radiation. For example, children treated with moderate dose of ^{131}I for thyroid adenomas had a detectable increase in thyroid cancer, but children treated with a much higher dose did not. Likewise, most studies of very-high-dose ^{131}I for treatment of Graves' disease have failed to find any increase in thyroid cancer, even though there is linear increase in thyroid cancer risk with ^{131}I absorption at moderate doses. Thus, iodine-131 is increasingly less employed in small doses in medical use (especially in children), but increasingly is used only in large and maximal treatment doses, as a way of killing targeted tissues (i.e. therapeutic use).

Iodine-131 can be "seen" by nuclear medicine imaging techniques (e.g., gamma cameras) whenever it is given for therapeutic use, since it is a strong emitter of gamma radiation. However, since the beta radiation causes tissue damage without contributing to any ability to see or "image" the isotope, other less-damaging radioisotopes of iodine such as iodine-123 (see isotopes of iodine) are preferred in situations when only imaging is wanted. The isotope ^{131}I is still occasionally used for purely diagnostic (i.e., imaging) work, due to its low expense compared to other iodine radioisotopes. No increase in thyroid cancer has been seen from the small medical imaging doses of ^{131}I. The low-cost availability of ^{131}I, in turn, is due to the relative ease of creating ^{131}I by neutron bombardment of natural tellurium in a nuclear reactor, then separating ^{131}I out by various simple methods (i.e., heating to drive off the volatile iodine). By contrast, other iodine radioisotopes are usually created by far more expensive techniques, starting with cyclotron radiation of capsules of pressurized xenon gas.

Iodine-131 is also one of the most commonly used gamma-emitting radioactive industrial tracer. Radioactive tracer isotopes are injected with hydraulic fracturing fluid to determine the injection profile and location of fractures created by hydraulic fracturing.

Much smaller incidental doses of iodine-131 than those used in medical therapeutic procedures, are concluded by some studies to be the major cause of increased thyroid cancers after exposure to nuclear fission products. Other studies did not find a correlation.

== Production ==
Most ^{131}I production is from neutron irradiation of a natural tellurium target in a nuclear reactor. Irradiation of natural tellurium produces almost entirely ^{131}I as the only radionuclide with a half-life longer than hours (and shorter than millions of years), since lighter isotopes of tellurium become heavier stable isotopes, or else stable antimony or iodine. However, the heaviest naturally occurring tellurium nuclide, ^{130}Te (34% of natural tellurium) absorbs a neutron to become tellurium-131, which beta decays with a half-life of 25 minutes to ^{131}I.

A tellurium compound can be irradiated while bound as an oxide to an ion exchange column, with evolved ^{131}I then eluted into an alkaline solution. More commonly, powdered elemental tellurium is irradiated and then ^{131}I separated from it by dry distillation of the iodine, which has a far higher vapor pressure. The element is then dissolved in a mildly alkaline solution in the standard manner, to produce ^{131}I as iodide and hypoiodate (which is soon reduced to iodide).

^{131}I is a fission product with a yield of 2.878% from uranium-235, and can be released in nuclear weapons tests and nuclear accidents. However, the short half-life means it is not present in significant quantities in cooled spent nuclear fuel, unlike iodine-129 whose half-life is nearly a billion times that of ^{131}I.

It is discharged to the atmosphere in small quantities by some nuclear power plants.

== Radioactive decay ==
Iodine-131 decay scheme (simplified)

^{131}I decays with a half-life of 8.0249 days emitting beta particles and gamma rays. Most often (89%), ^{131}I expends its 971 keV of decay energy by transforming to stable xenon-131 in two steps, with gamma decay following rapidly after beta decay:

$$\ce{^{131}_{53}I -> \beta{} + \bar\nu_e + ^{131}_{54}Xe^\ast{} + 606 keV}$$
$$\ce{^{131}_{54}Xe^\ast{}-> ^{131}_{54}Xe{} + \gamma{} + 364 keV}$$

The primary emissions of ^{131}I decay are thus electrons with a maximal energy of 606 keV and gammas of 364 keV. Beta decay also produces an antineutrino, which carries off variable amounts of the energy. The electrons, due to their high mean energy (190 keV, with a typical beta-decay spectrum) have a tissue penetration of 0.6 to 2 mm.

== Effects of exposure ==
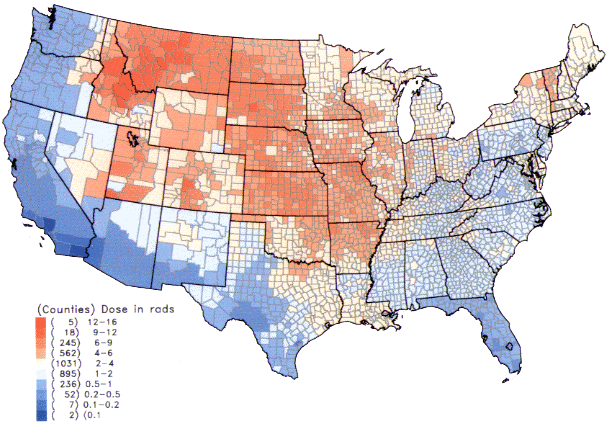
Per capita thyroid doses in the continental United States resulting from all exposure routes from all atmospheric nuclear tests conducted at the Nevada Test Site from 1951 to 1962. A Centers for Disease Control and Prevention/ National Cancer Institute study claims that nuclear fallout might have led to approximately 11,000 excess deaths, most caused by thyroid cancer linked to exposure to iodine-131.

Iodine in food is absorbed by the body and preferentially concentrated in the thyroid where it is needed for the functioning of that gland. When ^{131}I is present in high levels in the environment from radioactive fallout, it can be absorbed through contaminated food, and will also accumulate in the thyroid. As it decays, it may cause damage to the thyroid. The primary risk from exposure to ^{131}I is an increased risk of radiation-induced cancer in later life. Other risks include the possibility of non-cancerous growths and thyroiditis.

The risk of thyroid cancer in later life appears to diminish with increasing age at time of exposure. Most risk estimates are based on studies in which radiation exposures occurred in children or teenagers. When adults are exposed, it has been difficult for epidemiologists to detect a statistically significant difference in the rates of thyroid disease above that of a similar but otherwise-unexposed group.

The risk can be mitigated by taking iodine supplements, raising the total amount of iodine in the body and, therefore, reducing uptake and retention in the face and chest and lowering the relative proportion of radioactive iodine. However, such supplements were not consistently distributed to the population living nearest to the Chernobyl nuclear power plant after the disaster, though they were widely distributed to children in Poland.

Within the US, the highest ^{131}I fallout doses occurred during the 1950s and early 1960s to children having consumed fresh milk from sources contaminated as the result of above-ground testing of nuclear weapons. The National Cancer Institute provides additional information on the health effects from exposure to ^{131}I in fallout, as well as individualized estimates, for those born before 1971, for each of the 3070 counties in the US. The calculations are taken from data collected regarding fallout from the nuclear weapons tests conducted at the Nevada Test Site.

On 27 March 2011, the Massachusetts Department of Public Health reported that ^{131}I was detected in very low concentrations in rainwater from samples collected in Massachusetts, and that this likely originated from the Fukushima power plant. Farmers near the plant dumped raw milk, while testing in the United States found 0.8 pico-curies per liter of iodine-131 in a milk sample, but the radiation levels were 5,000 times lower than the FDA's "defined intervention level". The levels were expected to drop relatively quickly

=== Treatment and prevention ===
A common treatment method for preventing iodine-131 exposure is by saturating the thyroid with regular, stable iodine-127, as an iodide or iodate salt.

== Medical use ==
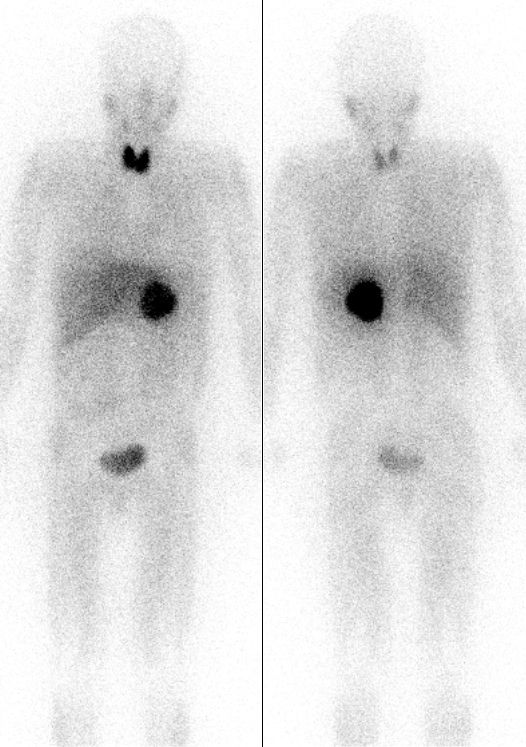
A pheochromocytoma tumor is seen as a dark sphere in the center of the body (it is in the left adrenal gland). The image is by MIBG scintigraphy, showing the tumor by radiation from radioiodine in the MIBG. Two images are seen of the same patient from front and back. The image of the thyroid in the neck is due to unwanted uptake of radioiodine (as iodide) by the thyroid, after breakdown of the radioactive iodine-containing medication. Accumulation at the sides of the head is from salivary gland due to uptake of I-131 mIBG by the sympathetic neuronal elements in the salivary glands. Meta-[I-131]iodobenzylguanidine is a radio-labeled analog of the adrenergic blocking agent guanethidine. Radioactivity is also seen from uptake by the liver, and excretion by the kidneys with accumulation in the bladder.

Iodine-131 is used for unsealed source radiotherapy in nuclear medicine to treat several conditions. It can also be detected by gamma cameras for diagnostic imaging, however it is rarely administered for diagnostic purposes only; imaging will normally be done following a therapeutic dose. Use of the ^{131}I as iodide salt exploits the mechanism of absorption of iodine by the normal cells of the thyroid gland.

=== Treatment of thyrotoxicosis ===
Major uses of ^{131}I include the treatment of thyrotoxicosis (hyperthyroidism) due to Graves' disease, and sometimes hyperactive thyroid nodules (abnormally active thyroid tissue that is not malignant). The therapeutic use of radioiodine to treat hyperthyroidism from Graves' disease was first reported by Saul Hertz in 1941. The dose is typically administered orally (either as a liquid or capsule), in an outpatient setting, and is usually 400–600 megabecquerels (MBq). Radioactive iodine (iodine-131) alone can potentially worsen thyrotoxicosis in the first few days after treatment. One side effect of treatment is an initial period of a few days of increased hyperthyroid symptoms. This occurs because when the radioactive iodine destroys the thyroid cells, they can release thyroid hormone into the blood stream. For this reason, sometimes patients are pre-treated with thyrostatic medications such as methimazole, and/or they are given symptomatic treatment such as propranolol. Radioactive iodine treatment is contraindicated in breast-feeding and pregnancy

=== Treatment of thyroid cancer ===
Iodine-131, in higher doses than for thyrotoxicosis, is used for ablation of remnant thyroid tissue following a complete thyroidectomy to treat thyroid cancer.

==== Administration of I-131 for ablation ====
Typical therapeutic doses of I-131 are between 2220 and 7400 megabecquerels (MBq). Because of this high radioactivity and because the exposure of stomach tissue to beta radiation would be high near an undissolved capsule, I-131 is sometimes administered to human patients in a small amount of liquid. Administration of this liquid form is usually by straw which is used to slowly and carefully suck up the liquid from a shielded container. For administration to animals (for example, cats with hyperthyroidism), for practical reasons the isotope must be administered by injection. European guidelines recommend administration of a capsule, due to "greater ease to the patient and the superior radiation protection for caregivers".

==== Post-treatment isolation ====
Ablation doses are usually administered on an inpatient basis, and IAEA International Basic Safety Standards recommend that patients are not discharged until the activity falls below 1100 MBq. ICRP advice states that "comforters and carers" of patients undergoing radionuclide therapy should be treated as members of the public for dose constraint purposes and any restrictions on the patient should be designed based on this principle.

Patients receiving I-131 radioiodine treatment may be warned not to have sexual intercourse for one month (or shorter, depending on dose given), and women told not to become pregnant for six months afterwards. "This is because a theoretical risk to a developing fetus exists, even though the amount of radioactivity retained may be small and there is no medical proof of an actual risk from radioiodine treatment. Such a precaution would essentially eliminate direct fetal exposure to radioactivity and markedly reduce the possibility of conception with sperm that might theoretically have been damaged by exposure to radioiodine." These guidelines vary from hospital to hospital and will depend on national legislation and guidance, as well as the dose of radiation given. Some also advise not to hug or hold children when the radiation is still high, and a one- or two- metre distance to others may be recommended.

I-131 will be eliminated from the body over the next several weeks after it is given. The majority of I-131 will be eliminated from the human body in 3–5 days, through natural decay, and through excretion in sweat and urine. Smaller amounts will continue to be released over the next several weeks, as the body processes thyroid hormones created with the I-131. For this reason, it is advised to regularly clean toilets, sinks, bed sheets and clothing used by the person who received the treatment. Patients may also be advised to wear slippers or socks at all times, and avoid prolonged close contact with others. This minimizes accidental exposure by family members, especially children. Use of a decontaminant specially made for radioactive iodine removal may be advised. The use of chlorine bleach solutions, or cleaners that contain chlorine bleach for cleanup, are not advised, since radioactive elemental iodine gas may be released. Airborne I-131 may cause a greater risk of second-hand exposure, spreading contamination over a wide area. Patient is advised if possible to stay in a room with a bathroom connected to it to limit unintended exposure to family members.

Many airports have radiation detectors to detect the smuggling of radioactive materials. Patients should be warned that if they travel by air, they may trigger radiation detectors at airports up to 95 days after their treatment with ^{131}I.

=== Other therapeutic uses ===
The ^{131}I isotope is also used as a radioactive label for certain radiopharmaceuticals that can be used for therapy, e.g. ^{131}I-metaiodobenzylguanidine (^{131}I-MIBG) for imaging and treating pheochromocytoma and neuroblastoma. In all of these therapeutic uses, ^{131}I destroys tissue by short-range beta radiation. About 90% of its radiation damage to tissue is via beta radiation, and the rest occurs via its gamma radiation (at a longer distance from the radioisotope). It can be seen in diagnostic scans after its use as therapy, because ^{131}I is also a gamma-emitter.

=== Diagnostic uses ===
Because of the carcinogenicity of its beta radiation in the thyroid in small doses, I-131 is rarely used primarily or solely for diagnosis (although in the past this was more common due to this isotope's relative ease of production and low expense). Instead the more purely gamma-emitting radioiodine iodine-123 is used in diagnostic testing (nuclear medicine scan of the thyroid). The longer half-lived iodine-125 is also occasionally used when a longer half-life radioiodine is needed for diagnosis, and in brachytherapy treatment (isotope confined in small seed-like metal capsules), where the low-energy gamma radiation without a beta component makes iodine-125 useful. The other radioisotopes of iodine are never used in brachytherapy.

The use of ^{131}I as a medical isotope has been blamed for a routine shipment of biosolids being rejected from crossing the Canada—U.S. border. Such material can enter the sewers directly from the medical facilities, or by being excreted by patients after a treatment.

== Industrial radioactive tracer uses ==
Used for the first time in 1951 to localize leaks in a drinking water supply system of Munich, Germany, iodine-131 became one of the most commonly used gamma-emitting industrial radioactive tracers, with applications in isotope hydrology and leak detection.

Since the late 1940s, radioactive tracers have been used by the oil industry. Tagged at the surface, water is then tracked downhole, using the appropriated gamma detector, to determine flows and detect underground leaks. I-131 has been the most widely used tagging isotope in an aqueous solution of sodium iodide. It is used to characterize the hydraulic fracturing fluid to help determine the injection profile and location of fractures created by hydraulic fracturing.

== In popular culture ==
- The use of iodine-131 as a poison – used in small doses over a period of time to disrupt a person's ability to think and tell right from wrong – played a central role in the episode "The Case of the Melancholy Marksman" of the long-running CBS TV series Perry Mason (season 5, episode 24, first broadcast March 24, 1962).

== See also ==
- Isotopes of iodine
- Iodine in biology

Lighter:^{130}I	Iodine-131 is an isotope of iodine	Heavier:^{132}I
Decay product of:^{131}Te (β^{−})	Decay chain of iodine-131	Decays to:^{131}Xe (β^{−})
