= Saul Hertz =

American physician-scientist

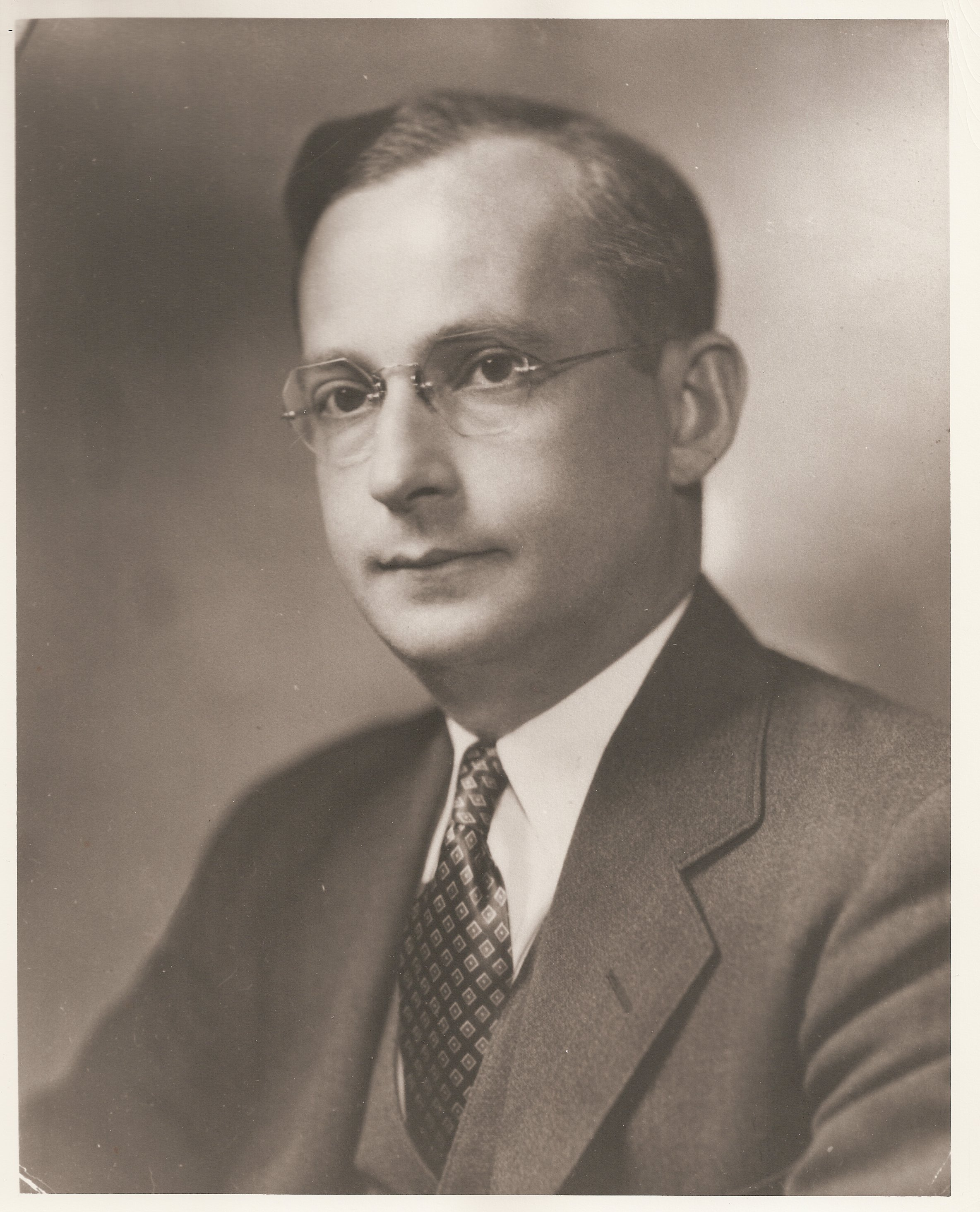
- Dr. Saul Hertz
- Born: April 20, 1905; Cleveland, Ohio, USA
- Died: July 28, 1950
- Education: University of Michigan; Harvard Medical School
- Known for: pioneered use of radioisotopes in diagnostic and therapeutic medicine
- Medical career
- Profession: physician
- Field: Nuclear medicine
- Institutions: Massachusetts General Hospital; Beth Israel Hospital
- Website: http://saulhertzmd.com/

Saul Hertz, M.D. (April 20, 1905 – July 28, 1950) was an American physician who devised the medical uses of radioactive iodine. Hertz pioneered the first targeted cancer therapies. Hertz is called the father of the field of theranostics, combining diagnostic imaging with therapy in a single or paired chemical substance(s).

== Early life and education ==
Saul Hertz was born on April 20, 1905, to father Aaron Daniel (A.D.) Hertz and mother Bertha Hertz in Cleveland, Ohio. His parents were Jewish immigrants from what is currently Golub-Dobrzyń in Poland. A.D. Hertz was a successful real estate developer. The Hertz's raised their seven sons according to Orthodox traditions. Saul Hertz attended public school and went on to graduate from the University of Michigan with Phi Beta Kappa honors in 1924. He received his medical degree from Harvard Medical School in 1929, at a time when there were strict quotas for outsiders (particularly Jews and Catholics – there were no women). Hertz completed his internship and residency at Cleveland's Mount Sinai Hospital, which had been established to serve Cleveland's East side Jewish population.

== Early studies with radioactive iodine ==
Hertz joined the Thyroid Clinic and Metabolism Laboratories at Massachusetts General Hospital in 1931. Although initially a volunteer, shortly thereafter, Hertz became Chief of the Thyroid Clinic, serving in this capacity from 1931 to 1943.

On November 12, 1936, Karl Compton, then president of the Massachusetts Institute of Technology, gave a presentation, entitled "What Physics Can Do For Biology and Medicine" in Harvard Medical School's Vanderbilt Hall. Hertz spontaneously asked President Compton, "Could iodine be made radioactive artificially?" on possible applications of physics to medicine. Compton responded in a letter to Hertz on December 15, 1936, writing, "Iodine could be made artificially radioactive" and "emits gamma rays and beta rays." On December 23, 1936, Hertz replied, “that iodine is selectively taken up by the thyroid” and “that he hopes that it will be a useful method of therapy.”

In 1937, Hertz began a collaboration with the physicist Arthur Roberts of the Massachusetts Institute of Technology (MIT). The purpose of the collaboration was to explore possible applications of iodine radioisotopes for diagnosis and treatment of thyroid diseases. Robley D. Evans, Director of the Radiation lab of MIT hired Arthur Roberts. As a condition of his employment, any papers forthcoming would include Robley Evans as an author. The Harvard Milton Fund sponsored the first preclinical studies of isotope iodine-128 on thyroid function in 48 rabbits, which Roberts produced without a cyclotron. Roberts produced the iodine-128 by means of neutron bombardment, building on previous studies by physicist Enrico Fermi. Roberts also devised a Geiger-Müller detector for quantifying the amount of the radioisotope of iodine present in the biological specimens produced in the experiment.

Hertz's experiment with Roberts involved studies of 48 rabbits. They determined in the study that the hyperplastic thyroid gland absorbed more of the radioactive substance than the normal gland. This proved that radioactive iodine could serve as a radioactive tracer in thyroid function. The tracer procedure was critical for determining the amount of iodine the human thyroid took up so that the dosage of radioactive iodine could be established for therapeutic purposes.

The original manuscript describing their rabbit study findings had Hertz and Roberts as the coauthors as they had done the work and written the paper. Primary sources document Roberts' production of I-128 at the MIT laboratory, while Hertz and Roberts solely administered and analyzed the biodistribution of the radioisotope in the rabbits. Robley Evans insisted that his name be added to the author list at the time the Hertz/Roberts study paper was published. Evans had taken no part in the research or writing of the paper.

At the time of the 1937 rabbit studies, Hertz predicted the therapeutic use of radioactive iodine for treating thyroid carcinoma in a medical journal.

== Therapy with radioactive iodine ==
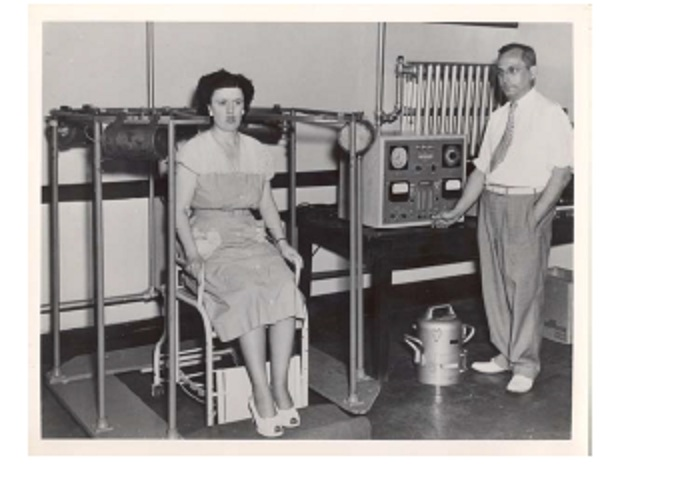
Saul Hertz demonstrates a multiscaler used in uptake testing essential to precision medicine, with colleague Doris Darby

Hertz's initial studies were conducted with iodine-128. However, this isotope has a half-life of only 25 minutes, rendering it impractical as a therapeutic or diagnostic agent. Human application of the iodine radioisotopes required a more suitable radioisotope of iodine.

Dr. Joseph Hamilton, a neurologist in a medical practice near Berkeley, became interested in the Hertz-Roberts research. Hamilton measured the differential absorption ratio of various radionuclides produced by the Berkeley cyclotron. Dr. Mayo Soley, a former colleague of Hertz at MGH, wrote to Hertz congratulating him on his RAI work. Dr. Soley was then at University of California Berkeley, where Ernest Lawrence had built a cyclotron. Hamilton and Soley were motivated by the animal work of Hertz and Roberts and sent Hamilton to Boston. Hamilton went to California to join Soley in the thyroid clinic. Hamilton Complained to Berkeley's Glenn Seaborg about the short half-life of I-128. In 1938, Glenn Seaborg and John Livingood had artificially prepared I-131 using the University of California Berkeley's cyclotron. With a half-life of 8 days, this isotope was better suited to practical medical applications than I-128. The building of the cyclotron at MIT for producing suitable isotopes was funded for $30,000 by the Mary Markle Foundation of New York City in 1938. The construction project was completed two years later in 1940. During those two years, the experiments with rabbits continued.

In early 1941, Hertz administered to the first human patient a therapeutic dose of cyclotron-produced radioiodine (RAI), the patient suffering from Graves' disease, a form of hyperthyroidism. This clinical trial was at the Massachusetts General Hospital. This administration was the first successful treatment of humans with an artificially produced radioactive material.

Subsequently, a series of 29 patients were treated in this way, and their outcomes were documented. The Journal of the American Medical Association published “Radioactive Iodine in the Study of Thyroid Physiology" with Hertz as lead author in its May 1946 issue. This article was a five-year follow-up study of the 29 patients, and it documented the successful treatment and safety of radioactive iodine for the treatment of hyperthyroidism. The follow-up study established the use of radioactive iodine therapy as a standard treatment for Graves’ disease.

== World War II interval ==
In 1943, Hertz joined the United States Navy Medical Corps. He served as an adjunct to the Manhattan Project, working in an aspect of the project related to biology and medicine for furthering medical uses of atomic energy. After his return from military duty, Hertz learned that MGH's Earl Chapman (who had taken over Hertz's clinical trials) and MIT's Robley Evans, had submitted a scientific publication to the Journal of American Medicine (JAMA) claiming priority for the development of the use of RAI to treat Graves' Disease. Morris Fishbein, editor of JAMA, requested that Hertz and Roberts, submit their seventh article on the subject, describing their successful use of RAI in the first clinical trials. As a result, two scientific publications appeared side by side in the May 1946, issue of the Journal of the American Medical Association, with the Hertz publication with Roberts appearing first in the issue of the journal.

== Stolen intellectual property ==
Current historians have documented the reason for two articles from the same institution appearing side by side in the Journal of the American Medical Association (JAMA) May 11, 1946 issue. The first by Hertz and Roberts, and the second by MGH's Earle Chapman and MIT's Robley Evans. Chapman, who took over Hertz's established cases during the war, teamed up with Evans to treat 22 new cases of their own. Chapman and Evans used Hertz's data to do their own human trials with minor tweaks and were the first to submit an article to JAMA, without consulting or acknowledging Hertz. They claimed propriety of the RAI therapy in treating Graves' disease. Hertz was informed about the Chapman-Evans Paper submission after the Chapman–Evans paper was sent back for revisions. Roberts insists that neither Chapman nor Evans have any propriety for the development of RAI treatment stating, "I would believe nothing on this subject from Chapman, whose self interest is obvious, and who bungled, whether deliberately or not, the follow up on Hertz’s original series when Hertz joined the Navy."

== Nuclear fission products in cancer treatment ==
Interest in atomic energy for peaceful purposes was heightened as the Atomic Age commenced following the atomic bombings of Hiroshima and Nagasaki. Hertz envisioned broader applications of radioisotopes in cancer treatment stating, “My new research project is in cancer of the thyroid which I believe holds the key to the larger problem of cancer in general".

Hertz established the Radioactive Isotope Research Institute in Boston, Massachusetts, in September 1946, with Samuel Seidlin of New York City as the associate director. Its purpose was to develop the applications of nuclear fission products to the treatment of thyroid cancer, goiter, and other malignant growths. After WWII, Hertz joined the newly expanding Boston's Beth Israel Hospital. There, Hertz directed the successful use of RAI in the diagnosis and treatment of thyroid carcinoma.

Hertz worked with the government to centralize an agency to handle the distribution of radioactive isotopes for use by private enterprises working on approved projects. He advocated for the Atomic Energy Commission to produce iodine-131 in the government’s atomic piles (nuclear reactors) at Oak Ridge National Laboratory, which lowered the cost and increased radioiodine's distribution. He made extensive studies of radioactive iodine in the treatment of thyroid cancer as well as in the production of total thyroidectomy in the treatment of certain cases of heart disease. In 1949, Hertz established the first nuclear medicine department at the Massachusetts Women's Hospital where he expanded his research to use radionuclides to diagnose and treat other forms of cancer. Hertz studied the application of radioactive phosphorus and the influences of hormones on cancer as displayed by isotope studies.

== Later career and influence ==
Hertz's research was seminal in the emergence of the field of nuclear medicine. His research continued with his appointments as instructor at Harvard Medical School from 1946 to 1950 and as an attachment to the Nuclear Physics Department at the Massachusetts Institute of Technology from 1939 to 1950.

The application of radioactive iodine in the diagnosis and treatment of thyroid disease is the cornerstone of nuclear medicine. Barbara Bush, who was successfully treated with radioiodine, wrote to Vitta Hertz, his widow, “It is comforting to know that so many people are well because of the scientific expertise of people like Dr. Hertz.”

In the early 21st century, there is a significant rise in the use of radioisotopes to diagnose and treat cancer, in a field of nuclear medicine referred to as theranostics. Yttrium-90 (Y-90) and Lutetium-177 are being used to diagnose and treat neuroendocrine tumors. The use of dosimetry has its origin in Hertz's work. Alpha targeted therapy is a therapy for patients with neuroblastomas (brain tumors). The use of the protein called NIS, that is needed for the thyroid to take up the RAI in the treatment of thyroid carcinoma, is being explored to treat breast cancer. Additionally I-131 is being utilized in the treatment of stem cell replacement for leukemia patients. These are all modern applications of nuclear medicine.

Hertz died on July 28, 1950, at age 45 of a heart attack.

== Selected honors ==
- Dalton Scholar - Massachusetts General Hospital - 1931 - 1933
- Henry Pickering Wolcott Fellow - Harvard Medical School - 1935 - 1937
- Key to Science/Sigma XI - Massachusetts Institute of Technology (Scientific Society) - 1940

=== Enduring memorials ===
The Society for Nuclear Medicine and Molecular Engineering administers the Saul Hertz, MD, Award in honor of Saul Hertz. The award recognizes individuals who have made outstanding contributions to the field of radionuclide therapy.

Connecticut Senator Richard Blumenthal entered into the congressional record on May 11, 2021 "Senate Remembering Dr. Saul Hertz." He stated "Mr. President, today I rise to recognize Dr Saul Hertz, a pioneer for medical uses of radioiodine, RAI... On March 31b, 1941... Hertz administered the first therapeutic use of radioiodine... Today, medical uses of RAI remain the g©old standard of targeted precision oncology."

Beginning in 2000, Hertz's daughter Barbara Hertz has led an effort to more thoroughly document the contributions of Hertz to medicine. This has included a website with his major publications. Barbara Hertz also co-authored with Kristin Schuller a 2010 publication in the journal Endocrine Practice on her father's major contributions to human health.

In 2014, the National Museum of Nuclear Science and History, a Smithsonian affiliate, displayed the, "Dr. Saul Hertz and the Origin of Nuclear Medicine" exhibit.

In 2021, the American Chemical Society (ACS) designated the Mass General Hospital as the "Saul Hertz and the Medical Uses of Radioiodine" National Historic Chemical Landmark. ACS Landmark commemorates this achievement in the history of chemical sciences and provides a record of Dr. Hertz's contributions to chemistry and society.

== See also ==
- Hyperthyroidism
- Nuclear medicine
- Radioactive iodine
