= Iodine-125 =

Radioisotope of iodine

General
- Symbol: ^{125}I
- Names: iodine-125, radioiodine
- Protons (Z): 53
- Neutrons (N): 72

Nuclide data
- Natural abundance: synth
- Half-life (t_{1/2}): 59.392 days
- Isotope mass: 124.904631 Da
- Parent isotopes: ^{125}Xe
- Decay products: ^{125}Te

Decay modes
- Decay mode: Decay energy (MeV)
- electron capture: 0.186 MeV

Iodine-125 (^{125}I) is a radioisotope of iodine which has uses in biological assays, nuclear medicine imaging and in radiation therapy as brachytherapy to treat a number of conditions, including prostate cancer, uveal melanomas, and brain tumors. It is the second longest-lived radioisotope of iodine, after iodine-129.

Its half-life is 59.392 days and it decays by electron capture to an excited state of tellurium-125. This state is not the metastable ^{125m}Te, but a much shorter-lived excited state that decays either by (7% chance) emitting a gamma ray with energy of 35 keV, or more likely (93% chance), undergoing internally conversion and ejecting an electron (of lower energy than 35 keV). The resulting electron vacancy leads to emission of characteristic X-rays (27–32 keV) and Auger electrons (50 to 500 eV). In either case stable ground state ^{125}Te is the product.

In medical applications, the internal conversion and Auger electrons cause little damage outside the cell which contains the isotope atom. The X-rays and gamma rays are of low enough energy to deliver a higher radiation dose selectively to nearby tissues, in "permanent" brachytherapy where the isotope capsules are left in place (^{125}I competes with palladium-103 in such uses).

Because of its relatively long half-life and emission of low-energy photons which can be detected by gamma-counter crystal detectors, ^{125}I is a preferred isotope for tagging antibodies in radioimmunoassay and other gamma-counting procedures involving proteins outside the body. The same properties of the isotope make it useful for brachytherapy, and for certain nuclear medicine scanning procedures, in which it is attached to proteins (albumin or fibrinogen), and where a half-life longer than that provided by ^{123}I is required for diagnostic or lab tests lasting several days.

Iodine-125 can be used in scanning/imaging the thyroid, but iodine-123 is preferred for this purpose, due to better radiation penetration and shorter half-life (13 hours). ^{125}I is useful for glomerular filtration rate (GFR) testing in the diagnosis or monitoring of patients with kidney disease. Iodine-125 is used therapeutically in brachytherapy treatments of tumors. For radiotherapy ablation of tissues that absorb iodine (such as the thyroid), or that absorb an iodine-containing radiopharmaceutical, the beta-emitter iodine-131 is the preferred isotope.

When studying plant immunity, ^{125}I is used as the radiolabel in tracking ligands to determine which plant pattern recognition receptors (PRRs) they bind to.

^{125}I is produced by the electron capture decay of ^{125}Xe, which is an artificial isotope of xenon, itself created by neutron capture on nearly-stable ^{124}Xe (it undergoes double electron capture with a half-life orders of magnitude larger than the age of the universe), which makes up around 0.1% of naturally occurring xenon.

== Production ==
^{125}I is a reactor-produced radionuclide and is available in large quantities. Its production involves the two following nuclear reactions:

^{124}Xe (n,γ) → ^{125m}Xe (57 s) → ^{125}I
^{124}Xe (n,γ) → ^{125g}Xe (16.9 h) → ^{125}I

The irradiation target is the primordial nuclide ^{124}Xe, which is the target isotope for making ^{125}I by neutron capture. It is loaded into irradiation capsules of the zirconium alloy zircaloy-2 (a corrosion resisting alloy transparent to neutrons) to a pressure of about 100 bar (~ 100 atm). Upon irradiation with slow neutrons in a nuclear reactor, several radioisotopes of xenon are produced. However, only the decay of ^{125}Xe leads to a radioiodine: ^{125}I. The other xenon radioisotopes decay either to stable xenon, or to various caesium isotopes, some of them radioactive (i.e., caesium-135 and caesium-137).

Long irradiation times are disadvantageous. Iodine-125 itself has a neutron capture cross section of 900 barns, and consequently during a long irradiation, part of the ^{125}I formed will be converted to ^{126}I, a beta-emitter and positron-emitter with a half-life of 12.93 days, which is not medically useful. In practice, the most useful irradiation time in the reactor amounts to a few days. Thereafter, the irradiated gas is allowed to decay for three or four days to eliminate short-lived unwanted radioisotopes, and to allow the newly produced xenon-125 to decay to iodine-125.

To isolate the radioiodine, the irradiated capsule is first cooled at low temperature (to condense the free iodine gas onto the capsule inner wall) and the remaining Xe gas is vented in a controlled way and recovered for further use. The inner walls of the capsule are then rinsed with a dilute NaOH solution to collect iodine as soluble iodide (I^{−}) and hypoiodite (IO^{−}), according to the standard disproportionation reaction of halogens in alkaline solution. Any caesium atom present immediately oxidizes and passes into the water as Cs^{+}. In order to eliminate any long-lived ^{135}Cs and ^{137}Cs which may be present in small amounts, the solution is passed through a cation-exchange column, which exchanges Cs^{+} for another non-radioactive cation (e.g., Na^{+}). The radioiodine (as anion I^{−} or IO^{−}) remains in solution as a mixture of iodide and hypoiodite.

== Availability and purity ==
Iodine-125 is commercially available in dilute NaOH solution as ^{125}I-iodide (or the hypohalite sodium hypoiodite, NaIO). The radioactive concentration lies at 4 to 11 GBq/mL and the specific radioactivity is > 75 GBq/μmol (7.5 × 10^{16} Bq/mol). The chemical and radiochemical purity is high. The radionuclidic purity is also high; some ^{126}I (t_{1/2} = 12.93 d) is unavoidable due to the neutron capture noted above. The ^{126}I tolerable content (which is set by the unwanted isotope interfering with dose calculations in brachytherapy) lies at about 0.2 atom % (atom fraction) of the total iodine (the rest being ^{125}I).

== Producers ==
As of October 2019, there were two producers of iodine-125, the McMaster Nuclear Reactor in Hamilton, Ontario, Canada; and a VVR-SM research reactor in Uzbekistan. The McMaster reactor is presently the largest producer of iodine-125, producing approximately 60 per cent of the global supply in 2018; with the remaining global supply produced at the reactor based in Uzbekistan. Annually, the McMaster reactor produces enough iodine-125 to treat approximately 70,000 patients.

In November 2019, the research reactor in Uzbekistan shut down temporarily in order to facilitate repairs. The temporary shutdown threatened the global supply of the radioisotope by leaving the McMaster reactor as the sole producer of iodine-125 during the period.

Prior to 2018, the National Research Universal (NRU) reactor at Chalk River Laboratories in Deep River, Ontario, was one of three reactors to produce iodine-125. However, on March 31, 2018, the NRU reactor was permanently shut down ahead of its scheduled decommissioning in 2028, as a result of a government order. The Russian nuclear reactor equipped to produce iodine-125, was offline as of December 2019.

== Decay properties ==
The detailed decay mechanism to form the stable daughter nuclide tellurium-125 is a multi-step process that begins with electron capture, which produces a tellurium-125 nucleus in an excited state with a half-life of 1.6 ns. The excited tellurium-125 nucleus may undergo gamma decay, emitting a gamma photon at 35.5 keV, or undergo internal conversion to emit an electron. The electron vacancy from internal conversion results in a cascade of electron relaxation as the core electron hole moves toward the valence orbitals. The cascade involves many characteristic X-rays and Auger transitions. In the case the excited tellurium-125 nucleus undergoes gamma decay, a different electron relaxation cascade follows before the nuclide comes to rest. Throughout the entire process an average of 13.3 electrons are emitted (10.3 of which are Auger electrons), most with energies less than 400 eV (79% of yield). The internal conversion and Auger electrons from the radioisotope have been found in one study to do little cellular damage, unless the radionuclide is directly incorporated chemically into cellular DNA, which is not the case for present radiopharmaceuticals which use ^{125}I as the radioactive label nuclide. Rather, cellular damage results from the gamma and characteristic X-ray photons.

As with other radioisotopes of iodine, accidental iodine-125 uptake in the body (mostly by the thyroid gland) can be blocked by the prompt administration of stable iodine-127 in the form of an iodide salt. Potassium iodide (KI) is typically used for this purpose.

However, unjustified self-medicated preventive administration of stable KI is not recommended in order to avoid disturbing the normal thyroid function. Such a treatment must be carefully dosed and requires an appropriate KI amount prescribed by a specialised physician.

== See also ==
- Isotopes of iodine
- Iodine-123
- Iodine-129
- Iodine-131
- Iodine in biology
  - 2,5-Dimethoxy-4-iodoamphetamine (DOI), often labeled with ^{125}I
