= Isotopes of iodine =

Isotopes of iodine (_{53}I)
Main isotopes			Decay	
Isotope	abundance	half-life (t_{1/2})	mode	product
^{123}I	synth	13.223 h	ε	^{123}Te
^{124}I	synth	4.1760 d	β^{+}	^{124}Te
^{125}I	synth	59.392 d	ε	^{125}Te
^{127}I	100%	stable		
^{129}I	trace	1.614×10^{7} y	β^{−}	^{129}Xe
^{131}I	synth	8.0249 d	β^{−}	^{131}Xe
^{135}I	synth	6.58 h	β^{−}	^{135}Xe

Standard atomic weight A_{r}°(I)
- 126.90447±0.00003; 126.90±0.01 (abridged)

Naturally occurring iodine (_{53}I) consists of one stable isotope, ^{127}I, and is a mononuclidic element for atomic weight. Radioisotopes of iodine are known from ^{108}I to ^{147}I.

The longest-lived of those, ^{129}I, has a half-life of 16.14 million years, which is too short for it to exist as a primordial nuclide. It is, however, found in nature as a trace isotope and universally distributed, produced naturally by cosmogenic sources in the atmosphere and by natural fission of the actinides. Today, however, most is artificial as fission product; like krypton-85 the contribution of past nuclear testing and of operating reactors are dwarfed by release from nuclear reprocessing.

All other iodine radioisotopes have half-lives less than 60 days, and four of these are used as tracers and therapeutic agents in medicine – ^{123}I, ^{124}I, ^{125}I, and ^{131}I. All industrial use of radioactive iodine isotopes involves these four. In addition, one other isotope has a half-life in the same range – ^{126}I (12.93 days; decays almost equally to tellurium or to xenon).

The isotope ^{135}I has a half-life less than seven hours, which is inconveniently short for those purposes. However, the unavoidable in situ production of this isotope is important in nuclear reactor control, as it decays to ^{135}Xe, the most powerful known neutron absorber, and the nuclide responsible for the so-called iodine pit phenomenon.

In addition to commercial production, ^{131}I (half-life 8 days) is one of the common radioactive fission products of nuclear fission, and thus occurs in large amounts inside nuclear reactors. Due to its volatility, short half-life, and high abundance in fission products, ^{131}I (along with the short-lived iodine isotope ^{132}I, which is produced from the decay of ^{132}Te with a half-life of 3 days) is responsible for the most dangerous part of the short-term radioactive contamination after environmental release of the radioactive waste from a nuclear power plant. For that reason, iodine supplements (usually potassium iodide) are given to the populace after nuclear accidents or explosions (and in some cases prior to any such incident as a civil defense mechanism) to reduce the uptake of radioactive iodine compounds by the thyroid.

== List of isotopes ==
Nuclide (Note: ^{m}I – Excited nuclear isomer.)	Z	N	Isotopic mass (Da) (Note: ( ) – Uncertainty (1σ) is given in concise form in parentheses after the corresponding last digits.) (Note: # – Atomic mass marked #: value and uncertainty derived not from purely experimental data, but at least partly from trends from the Mass Surface (TMS).)	Discovery year	Half-life (Note: # – Values marked # are not purely derived from experimental data, but at least partly from trends of neighboring nuclides (TNN).)	Decay mode (Note: Modes of decay: EC: / Electron capture; IT: / Isomeric transition; n: / Neutron emission; p: / Proton emission)	Daughter isotope (Note: Bold italics symbol as daughter – Daughter product is nearly stable.) (Note: Bold symbol as daughter – Daughter product is stable.)	Spin and parity (Note: ( ) spin value – Indicates spin with weak assignment arguments.)	Isotopic abundance
Nuclide	Excitation energy			Discovery year	Half-life	Decay mode	Daughter isotope	Spin and parity	Isotopic abundance
^{108}I	53	55	107.943334(23)	1991	26.4(8) ms	α (99.50%)	^{104}Sb	1+#	
^{108}I	53	55	107.943334(23)	1991	26.4(8) ms	p (0.50%)	^{107}Te	1+#	
^{108}I	53	55	107.943334(23)	1991	26.4(8) ms	β^{+}?	^{108}Te	1+#	
^{108}I	53	55	107.943334(23)	1991	26.4(8) ms	β^{+}, p?	^{107}Sb	1+#	
^{109}I	53	56	108.9380860(72)	1984	92.8(8) μs	p (99.986%)	^{108}Te	(1/2+,3/2+)	
^{109}I	53	56	108.9380860(72)	1984	92.8(8) μs	α (0.014%)	^{105}Sb	(1/2+,3/2+)	
^{110}I	53	57	109.935085(66)	1977	664(24) ms	β^{+} (71%)	^{110}Te	(1+)	
^{110}I	53	57	109.935085(66)	1977	664(24) ms	α (17%)	^{106}Sb	(1+)	
^{110}I	53	57	109.935085(66)	1977	664(24) ms	β^{+}, p (11%)	^{109}Sb	(1+)	
^{110}I	53	57	109.935085(66)	1977	664(24) ms	β^{+}, α (1.1%)	^{106}Sn	(1+)	
^{111}I	53	58	110.9302692(51)	1977	2.5(2) s	β^{+} (99.91%)	^{111}Te	5/2+#	
^{111}I	53	58	110.9302692(51)	1977	2.5(2) s	α (0.088%)	^{107}Sb	5/2+#	
^{111}I	53	58	110.9302692(51)	1977	2.5(2) s	β^{+}, p?	^{110}Sb	5/2+#	
^{112}I	53	59	111.928005(11)	1977	3.34(8) s	β^{+} (99.01%)	^{112}Te	1+#	
^{112}I	53	59	111.928005(11)	1977	3.34(8) s	β^{+}, p (0.88%)	^{111}Sb	1+#	
^{112}I	53	59	111.928005(11)	1977	3.34(8) s	β^{+}, α (0.104%)	^{108}Sn	1+#	
^{112}I	53	59	111.928005(11)	1977	3.34(8) s	α (0.0012%)	^{108}Sb	1+#	
^{113}I	53	60	112.9236501(86)	1977	6.6(2) s	β^{+}	^{113}Te	5/2+#	
^{113}I	53	60	112.9236501(86)	1977	6.6(2) s	α (3.310×10^{−5}#%)	^{109}Sb	5/2+#	
^{113}I	53	60	112.9236501(86)	1977	6.6(2) s	β^{+}, α?	^{109}Sn	5/2+#	
^{114}I	53	61	113.922019(22)	1977	2.01(15) s	β^{+}	^{114}Te	1+	
^{114}I	53	61	113.922019(22)	1977	2.01(15) s	β^{+}, p?	^{113}Sb	1+	
^{114}I	53	61	113.922019(22)	1977	2.01(15) s	α (7.7×10^{−9}#%)	^{110}Sb	1+	
^{114m}I	265.9(5) keV			(1995) (Note: Only published in a conference proceeding and not a refereed journal.)	6.2(5) s	β^{+}?	^{114}Te	(7−)	
^{114m}I	265.9(5) keV			(1995)	6.2(5) s	IT?	^{114}I	(7−)	
^{115}I	53	62	114.918048(31)	1969	1.3(2) min	β^{+}	^{115}Te	5/2+#	
^{116}I	53	63	115.916886(81)	1974	2.91(15) s	β^{+}	^{116}Te	1+	
^{116m}I	430.4(5) keV			1990	3.27(16) μs	IT	^{116}I	(7−)	
^{117}I	53	64	116.913646(27)	1969	2.22(4) min	β^{+} (77%)	^{117}Te	(5/2)+	
^{117}I	53	64	116.913646(27)	1969	2.22(4) min	EC (23%)	^{117}Te	(5/2)+	
^{118}I	53	65	117.913074(21)	1957	13.7(5) min	β^{+}	^{118}Te	(2−)	
^{118m}I	188.8(7) keV			1968	8.5(5) min	β^{+}	^{118}Te	(7−)	
^{118m}I	188.8(7) keV			1968	8.5(5) min	IT?	^{118}I	(7−)	
^{119}I	53	66	118.910061(23)	1954	19.1(4) min	β^{+} (51%)	^{119}Te	5/2+	
^{119}I	53	66	118.910061(23)	1954	19.1(4) min	EC (49%)	^{119}Te	5/2+	
^{120}I	53	67	119.910094(16)	1957	81.67(18) min	β^{+}	^{120}Te	2−	
^{120m1}I	72.61(9) keV			1974	242(5) ns	IT	^{120}I	3+	
^{120m2}I	320(150) keV			1967	53(4) min	β^{+}	^{120}Te	(7−)	
^{121}I	53	68	120.9074115(51)	1950	2.12(1) h	β^{+}	^{121}Te	5/2+	
^{121m}I	2376.9(4) keV			1982	9.0(14) μs	IT	^{121}I	21/2+#	
^{122}I	53	69	121.9075901(56)	1950	3.63(6) min	β^{+} (78%)	^{122}Te	1+	
^{122}I	53	69	121.9075901(56)	1950	3.63(6) min	EC (22%)	^{122}Te	1+	
^{122m1}I	314.9(4) keV			2019	193.3(9) ns	IT	^{122}I	7−	
^{122m2}I	379.4(5) keV			1990	79.1(12) μs	IT	^{122}I	7−	
^{122m3}I	394.1(5) keV			2019	78.2(4) μs	IT	^{122}I	(8+)	
^{122m4}I	444.1(5) keV			2019	146.5(12) ns	IT	^{122}I	8−	
^{123}I (Note: Has medical uses)	53	70	122.9055898(40)	1949	13.2232(15) h	EC	^{123}Te	5/2+	
^{124}I	53	71	123.9062103(25)	1938	4.1760(3) d	β^{+}	^{124}Te	2−	
^{125}I	53	72	124.9046306(15)	1947	59.392(8) d	EC	^{125}Te	5/2+	
^{126}I	53	73	125.9056242(41)	1938	12.93(5) d	β^{+} (52.7%)	^{126}Te	2−	
^{126}I	53	73	125.9056242(41)	1938	12.93(5) d	β^{−} (47.3%)	^{126}Xe	2−	
^{126m}I	111.00(23) keV			(2012)	128 ns	IT	^{126}I	3+	
^{127}I (Note: Fission product)	53	74	126.9044726(39)	1920	Stable			5/2+	1.0000
^{128}I	53	75	127.9058094(39)	1934	24.99(2) min	β^{−} (93.1%)	^{128}Xe	1+	
^{128}I	53	75	127.9058094(39)	1934	24.99(2) min	β^{+} (6.9%)	^{128}Te	1+	
^{128m1}I	137.851(3) keV			1982	845(20) ns	IT	^{128}I	4−	
^{128m2}I	167.368(4) keV			1982	175(15) ns	IT	^{128}I	(6)−	
^{129}I (Note: Long-lived fission product) (Note: Can be used to date certain early events in Solar System history and some use for dating groundwater)	53	76	128.9049836(34)	1951	1.614(12)×10^{7} y	β^{−}	^{129}Xe	7/2+	Trace (Note: Cosmogenic nuclide, also found as nuclear contamination)
^{130}I	53	77	129.9066702(34)	1938	12.36(1) h	β^{−}	^{130}Xe	5+	
^{130m1}I	39.9525(13) keV			1966	8.84(6) min	IT (84%)	^{130}I	2+	
^{130m1}I	39.9525(13) keV			1966	8.84(6) min	β^{−} (16%)	^{130}Xe	2+	
^{130m2}I	69.5865(7) keV			1989	133(7) ns	IT	^{130}I	6−	
^{130m3}I	82.3960(19) keV			1989	315(15) ns	IT	^{130}I	(8−)	
^{130m4}I	85.1099(10) keV			1989	254(4) ns	IT	^{130}I	6−	
^{131}I	53	78	130.90612638(65)	1939	8.0249(6) d	β^{−}	^{131}Xe	7/2+	
^{131m}I	1918.4(4) keV			2009	24(1) μs	IT	^{131}I	19/2−	
^{132}I	53	79	131.9079935(44)	1948	2.295(13) h	β^{−}	^{132}Xe	4+	
^{132m1}I	110(11) keV			1973	1.387(15) h	IT (86%)	^{132}I	(8−)	
^{132m1}I	110(11) keV			1973	1.387(15) h	β^{−} (14%)	^{132}Xe	(8−)	
^{132m2}I	1644+X keV			2020	342(12) ns	IT	^{132}I	(11+)	
^{133}I	53	80	132.9078284(63)	1940	20.83(8) h	β^{−}	^{133}Xe	7/2+	
^{133m1}I	1634.148(10) keV			(1970)	9(2) s	IT	^{133}I	(19/2−)	
^{133m2}I	1729.137(10) keV			1984	~170 ns	IT	^{133}I	(15/2−)	
^{133m3}I	2493.7(4) keV			2009	469(15) ns	IT	^{133}I	(23/2+)	
^{134}I	53	81	133.9097757(52)	1948	52.5(2) min	β^{−}	^{134}Xe	(4)+	
^{134m}I	316.49(22) keV			1970	3.52(4) min	IT (97.7%)	^{134}I	(8)−	
^{134m}I	316.49(22) keV			1970	3.52(4) min	β^{−} (2.3%)	^{134}Xe	(8)−	
^{135}I (Note: Fission product that, along with its decay product ^{135}Xe, is responsible for the iodine pit instability in nuclear reactors)	53	82	134.9100594(22)	1940	6.58(3) h	β^{−}	^{135}Xe	7/2+	
^{136}I	53	83	135.914605(15)	1949	83.4(4) s	β^{−}	^{136}Xe	(1−)	
^{136m}I	206(15) keV			1968	46.6(11) s	β^{−}	^{136}Xe	(6−)	
^{137}I	53	84	136.9180282(90)	1943	24.13(12) s	β^{−} (92.49%)	^{137}Xe	7/2+#	
^{137}I	53	84	136.9180282(90)	1943	24.13(12) s	β^{−}, n (7.51%)	^{136}Xe	7/2+#	
^{138}I	53	85	137.9227264(64)	1949	6.26(3) s	β^{−} (94.67%)	^{138}Xe	(1−)	
^{138}I	53	85	137.9227264(64)	1949	6.26(3) s	β^{−}, n (5.33%)	^{137}Xe	(1−)	
^{138m}I	67.9(3) keV			2007	1.26(16) μs	IT	^{138}I	(3−)	
^{139}I	53	86	138.9264934(43)	1949	2.280(11) s	β^{−} (90.26%)	^{139}Xe	7/2+#	
^{139}I	53	86	138.9264934(43)	1949	2.280(11) s	β^{−}, n (9.74%)	^{138}Xe	7/2+#	
^{140}I	53	87	139.931716(13)	1972	588(10) ms	β^{−} (92.40%)	^{140}Xe	(2−)	
^{140}I	53	87	139.931716(13)	1972	588(10) ms	β^{−}, n (7.60%)	^{139}Xe	(2−)	
^{140}I	53	87	139.931716(13)	1972	588(10) ms	β^{−}, 2n?	^{138}Xe	(2−)	
^{140m1}I	39-X keV			2022	470(4) ms	β^{−}	^{140}Xe	(4−,5)	
^{140m2}I	0+Y keV			2022	910(5) ms	β^{−}	^{140}Xe	(0−,1)	
^{141}I	53	88	140.935666(17)	1974	420(7) ms	β^{−} (78.8%)	^{141}Xe	7/2+#	
^{141}I	53	88	140.935666(17)	1974	420(7) ms	β^{−}, n (21.2%)	^{140}Xe	7/2+#	
^{142}I	53	89	141.9411666(53)	1975	235(11) ms	β^{−}	^{142}Xe	2−#	
^{142}I	53	89	141.9411666(53)	1975	235(11) ms	β^{−}, n?	^{141}Xe	2−#	
^{142}I	53	89	141.9411666(53)	1975	235(11) ms	β^{−}, 2n?	^{140}Xe	2−#	
^{143}I	53	90	142.94548(22)#	1994	182(8) ms	β^{−}	^{143}Xe	7/2+#	
^{143}I	53	90	142.94548(22)#	1994	182(8) ms	β^{−}, n?	^{142}Xe	7/2+#	
^{143}I	53	90	142.94548(22)#	1994	182(8) ms	β^{−}, 2n?	^{141}Xe	7/2+#	
^{144}I	53	91	143.95134(43)#	1994	94(8) ms	β^{−}	^{144}Xe	1−#	
^{144}I	53	91	143.95134(43)#	1994	94(8) ms	β^{−}, n?	^{143}Xe	1−#	
^{144}I	53	91	143.95134(43)#	1994	94(8) ms	β^{−}, 2n?	^{142}Xe	1−#	
^{145}I	53	92	144.95585(54)#	2010	89.7(93) ms	β^{−}	^{145}Xe	7/2+#	
^{145}I	53	92	144.95585(54)#	2010	89.7(93) ms	β^{−}, n?	^{144}Xe	7/2+#	
^{145}I	53	92	144.95585(54)#	2010	89.7(93) ms	β^{−}, 2n?	^{143}Xe	7/2+#	
^{146}I	53	93	145.96185(32)#	2018	94(26) ms	β^{−}	^{146}Xe		
^{146}I	53	93	145.96185(32)#	2018	94(26) ms	β^{−}, n?	^{145}Xe		
^{146}I	53	93	145.96185(32)#	2018	94(26) ms	β^{−}, 2n?	^{144}Xe		
^{147}I	53	94	146.96651(32)#	2018	60# ms [>550 ns]	β^{−}?	^{147}Xe	3/2−#	
^{147}I	53	94	146.96651(32)#	2018	60# ms [>550 ns]	β^{−}, n?	^{146}Xe	3/2−#	
^{147}I	53	94	146.96651(32)#	2018	60# ms [>550 ns]	β^{−}, 2n?	^{145}Xe	3/2−#	
This table header & footer:

== Notable radioisotopes ==
Radioisotopes of iodine are called radioactive iodine or radioiodine. Dozens exist, but about a half dozen are the most notable in applied sciences such as the life sciences and nuclear power, as detailed below. Mentions of radioiodine in health care contexts refer more often to iodine-131 than to other isotopes.

Of the many isotopes of iodine, only two are typically used in a medical setting: iodine-123 and iodine-131. Since ^{131}I has both a beta and gamma decay mode, it can be used for radiotherapy or for imaging. ^{123}I, which has no beta activity, is more suited for routine nuclear medicine imaging of the thyroid and other medical processes and less damaging internally to the patient. There are some situations in which iodine-124 and iodine-125 are also used in medicine.

Due to preferential uptake of iodine by the thyroid, radioiodine is extensively used in imaging of and, in the case of ^{131}I, destroying dysfunctional thyroid tissues. Other types of tissue selectively take up certain iodine-131-containing tissue-targeting and killing radiopharmaceutical agents (such as MIBG). Iodine-125 is the only other iodine radioisotope used in radiation therapy, but only as an implanted capsule in brachytherapy, where the isotope never has a chance to be released for chemical interaction with the body's tissues.

=== Iodine-123 and iodine-125 ===
The gamma-emitting isotopes iodine-123 (half-life 13.223 hours), and (less commonly) the longer-lived and less energetic iodine-125 (half-life 59.392 days) are used as nuclear imaging tracers to evaluate the anatomic and physiologic function of the thyroid. Abnormal results may be caused by disorders such as Graves' disease or Hashimoto's thyroiditis. Both isotopes decay by electron capture (EC) to the corresponding tellurium nuclides, but in neither case are these the metastable nuclides ^{123m}Te and ^{125m}Te (which are of higher energy, and are not produced from radioiodine). Instead, the excited tellurium nuclides decay immediately (half-life too short to detect). Following EC, the excited ^{123}Te from ^{123}I emits a high-speed 127 keV internal conversion electron (not a beta ray) about 13% of the time, but this does little cellular damage due to the nuclide's short half-life and the relatively small fraction of such events. In the remainder of cases, a 159 keV gamma ray is emitted, which is well-suited for gamma imaging.

Excited ^{125}Te resulting from electron capture of ^{125}I also emits a much lower-energy internal conversion electron (35.5 keV), which does relatively little damage due to its low energy, even though its emission is more common. The relatively low-energy gamma from ^{125}I/^{125}Te decay is poorly suited for imaging, but can still be seen, and this longer-lived isotope is necessary in tests that require several days of imaging, for example, fibrinogen scan imaging to detect blood clots.

Both ^{123}I and ^{125}I emit copious low energy Auger electrons after their decay, but these do not cause serious damage (double-stranded DNA breaks) in cells, unless the nuclide is incorporated into a medication that accumulates in the nucleus, or into DNA (this is never the case is clinical medicine, but it has been seen in experimental animal models).

Iodine-125 is also commonly used by radiation oncologists in low dose rate brachytherapy in the treatment of cancer at sites other than the thyroid, especially in prostate cancer. When ^{125}I is used therapeutically, it is encapsulated in titanium seeds and implanted in the area of the tumor, where it remains. The low energy of the gamma spectrum in this case limits radiation damage to tissues far from the implanted capsule. Iodine-125, due to its suitable longer half-life and less penetrating gamma spectrum, is also often preferred for laboratory tests that rely on iodine as a tracer that is counted by a gamma counter, such as in radioimmunoassaying.

^{125}I is used as the radiolabel in investigating which ligands go to which plant pattern recognition receptors (PRRs).

=== Iodine-124 ===
Iodine-124 is a proton-rich isotope of iodine with a half-life of 4.1760 days, decaying to ^{124}Te by 77.3% electron capture and 22.7% positron emission. Iodine-124 can be made by numerous nuclear reactions in a cyclotron. The most common starting material used is ^{124}Te.

Iodine-124 as the iodide salt can be used to directly image the thyroid using positron emission tomography (PET). Iodine-124 can also be used as a PET radiotracer with a usefully longer half-life compared with fluorine-18. In this use, the nuclide is chemically bonded to a pharmaceutical to form a positron-emitting radiopharmaceutical, and injected into the body, where again it is imaged by PET scan.

=== Iodine-129 ===
Iodine-129 (^{129}I; half-life 16.1 million years) is a product of cosmic ray spallation on various isotopes of xenon in the atmosphere, in cosmic ray muon interaction with tellurium-130, and also uranium and plutonium fission, both in subsurface rocks and nuclear reactors. Artificial nuclear processes, in particular nuclear fuel reprocessing and atmospheric nuclear weapons tests, have now swamped the natural signal for this isotope. Nevertheless, it now serves as a groundwater tracer as indicator of nuclear waste dispersion into the natural environment. In a similar fashion, ^{129}I was used in rainwater studies to track fission products following the Chernobyl disaster.

In some ways, ^{129}I is similar to ^{36}Cl. It is a soluble halogen, exists mainly as a non-sorbing anion, and is produced by cosmogenic, thermonuclear, and in-situ reactions. In hydrologic studies, ^{129}I concentrations are usually reported as the ratio of ^{129}I to total I (which is virtually all ^{127}I). As is the case with ^{36}Cl/Cl, ^{129}I/I ratios in nature are quite small: the pre-nuclear ratio was nearly 10^{−12}, but as mentioned artificial sources are normally now much greater. ^{129}I differs from ^{36}Cl in that its half-life is longer (16.1 vs. 0.301 million years), it is highly biophilic, and occurs in multiple ionic forms (commonly, I^{−} and IO_{3}^{−}), which have different chemical behaviors. This makes it fairly easy for ^{129}I to enter the biosphere as it becomes incorporated into vegetation, soil, milk, animal tissue, etc. Excesses of stable ^{129}Xe in meteorites have been shown to result from decay of "primordial" iodine-129 produced newly by the supernovas that created the dust and gas from which the Solar System formed. This isotope has long decayed and is thus referred to as "extinct". Historically, ^{129}I was the first extinct radionuclide to be identified as present in the early Solar System. Its decay is the basis of the I-Xe iodine-xenon radiometric dating scheme, which covers the first 85 million years of Solar System evolution.

=== Iodine-131 ===
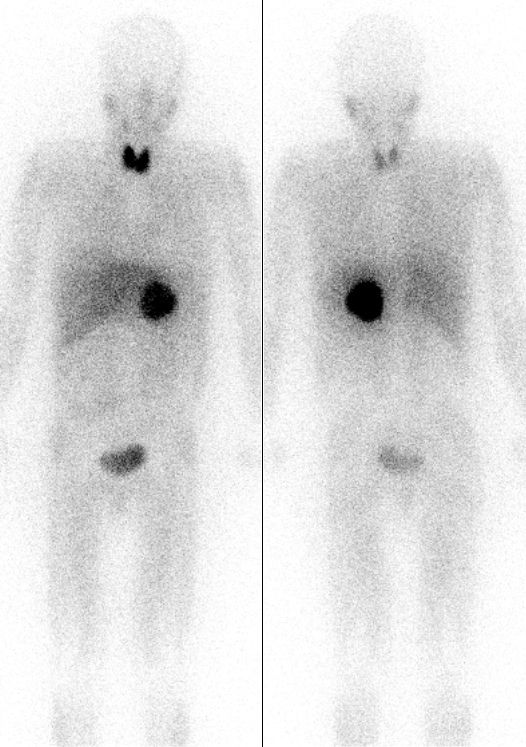
A Pheochromocytoma is seen as a dark sphere in the center of the body (it is in the left adrenal gland). Image is by MIBG scintigraphy, with radiation from radioiodine in the MIBG. Two images are seen of the same patient from front and back. Note the dark image of the thyroid due to unwanted uptake of radioiodine from the medication by the thyroid gland in the neck. Accumulation at the sides of the head is from salivary gland uptake of iodide. Radioactivity is also seen in the bladder.

Iodine-131 (^{131}I) is a beta-emitting isotope with a half-life of 8.0249 days, and comparatively energetic (0.61 MeV) beta radiation, which penetrates 0.6 to 2.0 mm from the site of uptake. This beta radiation can be used for the destruction of thyroid nodules or hyperfunctioning thyroid tissue and for elimination of remaining thyroid tissue after surgery for the treatment of Graves' disease. The purpose of this therapy, which was first explored by Dr. Saul Hertz in 1941, is to destroy thyroid tissue that could not be removed surgically. In this procedure, ^{131}I is administered either intravenously or orally following a diagnostic scan. This procedure may also be used, with higher doses of radio-iodine, to treat patients with thyroid cancer.

The ^{131}I is taken up into thyroid tissue and concentrated there. The beta particles emitted by the radioisotope destroys the associated thyroid tissue with little damage to surrounding tissues (more than 2.0 mm from the tissues absorbing the iodine). Due to similar destruction, ^{131}I is the iodine radioisotope used in other water-soluble iodine-labeled radiopharmaceuticals (such as MIBG) used therapeutically to destroy tissues.

The high energy beta radiation (up to 606 keV) from ^{131}I causes it to be the most carcinogenic of the iodine isotopes. It is thought to cause the majority of excess thyroid cancers seen after nuclear fission contamination (such as bomb fallout or severe nuclear reactor accidents like the Chernobyl disaster) However, these epidemiological effects are seen primarily in children, and treatment of adults and children with therapeutic ^{131}I, and epidemiology of adults exposed to low-dose ^{131}I has not demonstrated carcinogenicity.

=== Iodine-135 ===
Iodine-135 is a neutron-rich isotope of iodine with a half-life of 6.58 hours, and important to nuclear reactor physics. It is produced in relatively large amounts as a fission product, and decays to xenon-135, which is a nuclear poison with the largest known thermal neutron cross section, which is a cause of multiple complications in the control of nuclear reactors. The process of buildup of xenon-135 from accumulated iodine-135 can temporarily preclude restarting a reactor that has been shut down. This is known as xenon poisoning or "falling into an iodine pit".

== See also ==
- Isotopes of xenon
- Isotopes of tellurium
- Isotopes of antimony
- Isotopes of tin
