= Iodine-123 =

Isotope of iodine

General
- Symbol: ^{123}I
- Names: iodine-123, radioiodine
- Protons (Z): 53
- Neutrons (N): 70

Nuclide data
- Natural abundance: 0
- Half-life (t_{1/2}): 13.223 hours
- Isotope mass: 122.905590 Da
- Parent isotopes: ^{123}Xe
- Decay products: ^{123}Te

Decay modes
- Decay mode: Decay energy (MeV)
- electron capture: 1.228 MeV

Iodine-123 (^{123}I) is a radioactive isotope of iodine used in nuclear medicine imaging, including single-photon emission computed tomography (SPECT) or SPECT/CT exams. The isotope's half-life is 13.223 hours; the decay by electron capture to tellurium-123 emits gamma radiation with a predominant energy of 159 keV (this is the gamma primarily used for imaging). In medical applications, the radiation is detected by a gamma camera. The isotope is typically applied as iodide-123, the anionic form.

== Production ==
Iodine-123 is produced in a cyclotron by proton irradiation of xenon-124 in a capsule, which on absorbing a proton of the used energy will lose a neutron and proton to form xenon-123, or else two neutrons to form caesium-123, which decays to it. The xenon-123 formed by either route then decays to iodine-123, and is trapped on the inner wall of the irradiation capsule under refrigeration, then eluted with sodium hydroxide in a halogen disproportionation reaction, similar to collection of iodine-125 after it is formed from xenon by neutron irradiation (see article on ^{125}I for more details).

^{124}Xe (p,pn) ^{123}Xe → ^{123}I

^{124}Xe (p,2n) ^{123}Cs → ^{123}Xe → ^{123}I

Iodine-123 is usually supplied as [^{123}I]-sodium iodide in 0.1 M sodium hydroxide solution, at 99.8% isotopic purity.

^{123}I for medical applications has also been produced at Oak Ridge National Laboratory by proton cyclotron bombardment of 80% isotopically enriched tellurium-123.

^{123}Te (p,n) ^{123}I

== Decay ==
The detailed decay mechanism is electron capture (EC) to form an excited state of the observationally stable nuclide tellurium-123 . The excited state of ^{123}Te produced is not the metastable nuclear isomer ^{123m}Te (the decay of ^{123}I does not involve enough energy to produce ^{123m}Te), but rather is a much shorter-lived excited state of ^{123}Te that immediately decays to ground state ^{123}Te by emitting a gamma ray at the energy noted, or else (13% of the time) by internal conversion electron emission, followed by an average of 11 Auger electrons emitted at very low energies (50-500 eV). The latter decay channel also produces ground-state ^{123}Te. Especially because of the internal conversion decay channel, ^{123}I is not an absolutely pure gamma-emitter, although it may be considered so for clinically purposes.

The Auger electrons from the radioisotope have been found in one study to do little cellular damage, unless the radionuclide is directly incorporated chemically into cellular DNA, which is not the case for present radiopharmaceuticals which use ^{123}I as the radioactive label nuclide. The damage from the more penetrating gamma radiation and internal conversion electrons from the initial decay of ^{123}Te is moderated by the relatively short half-life of the isotope.

== Medical applications ==
Iodine-123
Clinical data
- ATC code: V09AB (WHO)

Legal status
- Legal status: US: ℞-only

Identifiers
- CAS Number: 2052213-29-1; iodide ion: 69239-56-1
- PubChem CID: iodide ion: 135300
- DrugBank: iodide ion: DB09420
- ChemSpider: iodide ion: 119193
- UNII: 8YWR746RPQ; iodide ion: 98QPV8670C
- CompTox Dashboard (EPA): DTXSID40988959

Chemical and physical data
- Formula: ^{123}I^{−}
- Molar mass: 122.91 g/mol
- 3D model (JSmol): Interactive image
- SMILES: [123I-]
- InChI: InChI=1S/HI/h1H/p-1/i1-4; Key:XMBWDFGMSWQBCA-AHCXROLUSA-M

^{123}I is the most suitable isotope of iodine for the diagnostic study of thyroid diseases. The half-life (13.223 hours) is ideal for the 24-hour iodine uptake test and ^{123}I has other advantages for diagnostic imaging thyroid tissue and thyroid cancer metastasis. The energy of the photon, 159 keV, is ideal for the NaI (sodium iodide) crystal detector of current gamma cameras and also for the pinhole collimators. It has much greater photon flux than ^{131}I. It gives approximately 20 times the counting rate of ^{131}I for the same administered dose, while the radiation burden to the thyroid is far less (1%) than that of ^{131}I. Moreover, scanning a thyroid remnant or metastasis with ^{123}I does not cause "stunning" of the tissue (with loss of uptake), because of the low radiation burden of this isotope. For the same reasons, ^{123}I is never used for thyroid cancer or Graves disease treatment, and this role is reserved for ^{131}I.

^{123}I is supplied as sodium iodide (NaI), sometimes in basic solution in which it has been dissolved as the free element. This is administered to a patient by ingestion under capsule form, by intravenous injection, or (less commonly due to problems involved in a spill) in a drink. The iodine is taken up by the thyroid gland and a gamma camera is used to obtain functional images of the thyroid for diagnosis. Quantitative measurements of the thyroid can be performed to calculate the iodine uptake (absorption) for the diagnosis of hyperthyroidism and hypothyroidism.

Dosing can vary; 7.5–25 megabecquerels (200–680 μCi) is recommended for thyroid imaging and for total body while an uptake test may use 3.7–11.1 MBq (100–300 μCi). There is a study that indicates a given dose can effectively result in effects of an otherwise higher dose, due to impurities in the preparation. The dose of radioiodine ^{123}I is typically tolerated by individuals who cannot tolerate contrast mediums containing larger concentration of stable iodine such as used in CT scan, intravenous pyelogram (IVP) and similar imaging diagnostic procedures. Iodine is not an allergen.

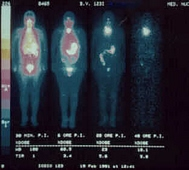
Sequence of 123-iodide human scintiscans after an intravenous injection, (from left) after 30 minutes, 20 hours, and 48 hours. A high and rapid concentration of radio-iodide is evident in cerebrospinal fluid (left), gastric and oral mucosa, salivary glands, arterial walls, ovary and thymus. In the thyroid gland, I-concentration is more progressive, as in a reservoir (from 1% after 30 minutes, and after 6, 20 h, to 5.8% after 48 hours, of the total injected dose).(Venturi, 2011)

^{123}I is also used as a label in other imaging radiopharmaceuticals, such as metaiodobenzylguanidine (MIBG) and ioflupane.

== Precautions ==
Removal of radioiodine contamination can be difficult and use of a decontaminant specially made for radioactive iodine removal is advised. Two common products designed for institutional use are Bind-It and I-Bind. General purpose radioactive decontamination products are often unusable for iodine, as these may only spread or volatilize it.

== See also ==
- Isotopes of iodine
- Iodine-125
- Iodine-129
- Iodine-131
- Iodine in biology
