= John J. Livingood =

American physicist (1903–1986)

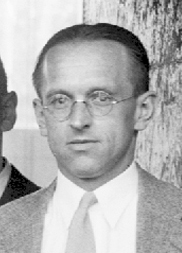
- Livingood in 1938
- Born: John Jacob Livingood; March 7, 1903; Cincinnati, Ohio, U.S.
- Died: July 21, 1986 (aged 83); Hinsdale, Illinois, U.S.
- Education: Princeton University (AB, MA, PhD)
- Spouse: Carolyn Zipf (m. 1934)
- Children: 2
- Scientific career
- Fields: Nuclear physics
- Workplaces: Princeton University; University of California, Berkeley; Harvard University; Radio Research Laboratory; Collins Radio Company
- Thesis: The Arc Spectrum of Platinum (1929)

John Jacob Livingood (March 7, 1903 – July 21, 1986) was an American nuclear physicist specialising in the design of particle accelerators. With Glenn Seaborg he discovered and characterized a number of new radioisotopes useful for nuclear medicine, including cobalt-60, iodine-131 and iron-59.

== Biography ==
Livingood was born in Cincinnati, Ohio. He studied at Princeton University, gaining a Ph.D. in 1929 on the arc spectrum of platinum. He taught at Princeton and authored the introductory textbook Experimental Atomic Physics with Gaylord Harnwell. In 1932 he began research working alongside Seaborg at the Radiation Laboratory at the University of California, Berkeley led by Ernest Lawrence. Livingood was part of a team that identified over a dozen new radioisotopes.

From 1938 he worked on the construction of a new cyclotron at Harvard University, before joining the secret Radio Research Laboratory in 1942 to carry out military research.

In 1945 he joined Collins Radio Company working on new cyclotrons for the Argonne and Brookhaven National Laboratories. From 1952 he led the design and construction at Argonne of the Zero Gradient Synchrotron.

In 1961 he authored the book Principles of Cyclic Particle Accelerators and in 1969 The Optics of Dipole Magnets.

Livingood died July 21, 1986 aged 83 from complications following a stroke in 1980. He was survived by his wife and two children.

== Books ==
- Harnwell, G.P.; Livingood, J.J. (1933). Experimental Atomic Physics. New York and London: McGraw Hill.
- Livingood, John J. (1961). Principles of Cyclic Particle Accelerators. Princeton, N.J.: D. Van Nostrand Company.
- ———————— (1969). The Optics of Dipole Magnets. New York: Academic Press Inc.
