= Brachytherapy =

Type of radiation therapy

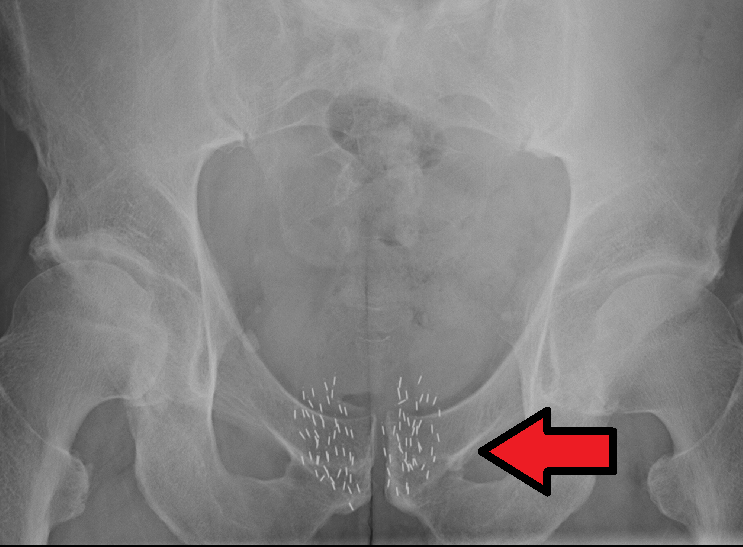
- Arrow points to brachytherapy beads used to treat prostate cancer.
- Other names: internal radiotherapy, sealed source radiotherapy, curietherapy, endocurietherapy
- ICD-10-PCS: D?1
- ICD-9-CM: 92.27
- MeSH: D001918

Brachytherapy is a form of radiation therapy where a sealed radiation source is placed inside or next to the area requiring treatment. The word "brachytherapy" comes from the Greek word βραχύς, brachys, meaning "short-distance" or "short". Brachytherapy is commonly used as an effective treatment for cervical, prostate, breast, esophageal and skin cancer and can also be used to treat tumours in many other body sites. Treatment results have demonstrated that the cancer-cure rates of brachytherapy are either comparable to surgery and external beam radiotherapy (EBRT) or are improved when used in combination with these techniques. Brachytherapy can be used alone such as in early prostate cancer or in combination with other therapies such as surgery, EBRT and chemotherapy such as in advanced cervical cancer

Brachytherapy contrasts with unsealed source radiotherapy, in which a therapeutic radionuclide (radioisotope) is injected into the body to chemically localize to the tissue requiring destruction. It also contrasts to External Beam Radiation Therapy (EBRT), in which high-energy x-rays (or occasionally gamma-rays from a radioisotope like cobalt-60) are directed at the tumour from outside the body. Brachytherapy instead involves the precise placement of short-range radiation-sources (radioisotopes, iodine-125 or caesium-131 for instance) directly at the site of the cancerous tumour. These are enclosed in a protective capsule or wire, which allows the ionizing radiation to escape to treat and kill surrounding tissue but prevents the charge of radioisotope from moving or dissolving in body fluids. The capsule may be removed later, or (with some radioisotopes) it may be allowed to remain in place.

A feature of brachytherapy is that the irradiation affects only a very localized area around the radiation sources. Exposure to radiation of healthy tissues farther away from the sources is therefore reduced. In addition, if the patient moves or if there is any movement of the tumour within the body during treatment, the radiation sources retain their correct position in relation to the tumour. These characteristics of brachytherapy provide advantages over EBRT – the tumour can be treated with very high doses of localised radiation whilst reducing the probability of unnecessary damage to surrounding healthy tissues.

A course of brachytherapy can be completed in less time than other radiotherapy techniques. This can help reduce the chance for surviving cancer-cells to divide and grow in the intervals between each radiotherapy dose. Patients typically have to make fewer visits to the radiotherapy clinic compared with EBRT, and may receive the treatment as outpatients. This makes treatment accessible and convenient for many patients. These features of brachytherapy mean that most patients are able to tolerate the brachytherapy procedure very well.

The global market for brachytherapy reached US$680 million in 2013, of which the high-dose rate (HDR) and LDR segments accounted for 70%. Microspheres and electronic brachytherapy comprised the remaining 30%. One analysis predicts that the brachytherapy market may reach over US$2.4 billion in 2030, growing by 8% annually, mainly driven by the microspheres market as well as electronic brachytherapy, which is gaining significant interest worldwide as a user-friendly technology.

== Medical uses ==
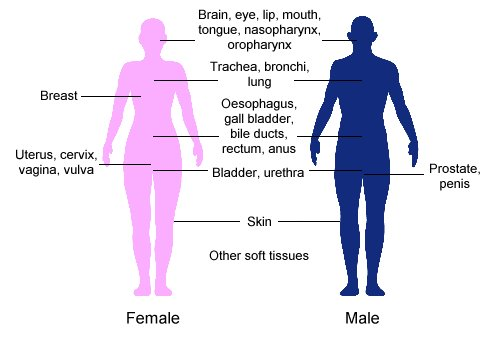
Body sites in which brachytherapy can be used to treat cancer

Brachytherapy is commonly used to treat cancers of the cervix, prostate, breast, and skin.

Brachytherapy can also be used in the treatment of tumours of the brain, eye, head and neck region (lip, floor of mouth, tongue, nasopharynx and oropharynx), respiratory tract (trachea and bronchi), digestive tract (oesophagus, gall bladder, bile-ducts, rectum, anus), urinary tract (bladder, urethra, penis), female reproductive tract (uterus, vagina, vulva), and soft tissues.

As the radiation sources can be precisely positioned at the tumour treatment site, brachytherapy enables a high dose of radiation to be applied to a small area. Furthermore, because the radiation sources are placed in or next to the target tumour, the sources maintain their position in relation to the tumour when the patient moves or if there is any movement of the tumour within the body. Therefore, the radiation sources remain accurately targeted. This enables clinicians to achieve a high level of dose conformity – i.e. ensuring the whole of the tumour receives an optimal level of radiation. It also reduces the risk of damage to healthy tissue, organs or structures around the tumour, thus enhancing the chance of cure and preservation of organ function.

The use of HDR brachytherapy enables overall treatment times to be reduced compared with EBRT. Patients receiving brachytherapy generally have to make fewer visits for radiotherapy compared with EBRT, and overall radiotherapy treatment plans can be completed in less time. Many brachytherapy procedures are performed on an outpatient basis. This convenience may be particularly relevant for patients who have to work, older patients, or patients who live some distance from treatment centres, to ensure that they have access to radiotherapy treatment and adhere to treatment plans. Shorter treatment times and outpatient procedures can also help improve the efficiency of radiotherapy clinics.

Brachytherapy can be used with the aim of curing the cancer in cases of small or locally advanced tumours, provided the cancer has not metastasized (spread to other parts of the body). In appropriately selected cases, brachytherapy for primary tumours often represents a comparable approach to surgery, achieving the same probability of cure and with similar side effects. However, in locally advanced tumours, surgery may not routinely provide the best chance of cure and is often not technically feasible to perform. In these cases radiotherapy, including brachytherapy, offers the only chance of cure. In more advanced disease stages, brachytherapy can be used as palliative treatment for symptom relief from pain and bleeding.

In cases where the tumour is not easily accessible or is too large to ensure an optimal distribution of irradiation to the treatment area, brachytherapy can be combined with other treatments, such as EBRT and/or surgery. Combination therapy of brachytherapy exclusively with chemotherapy is rare.

=== Cervical cancer ===
Brachytherapy is commonly used in the treatment of early or locally confined cervical cancer and is a standard of care in many countries. Cervical cancer can be treated with either LDR, PDR or HDR brachytherapy. Used in combination with EBRT, brachytherapy can provide better outcomes than EBRT alone. The precision of brachytherapy enables a high dose of targeted radiation to be delivered to the cervix, while minimising radiation exposure to adjacent tissues and organs.

The chances of staying free of disease (disease-free survival) and of staying alive (overall survival) are similar for LDR, PDR and HDR treatments. However, a key advantage of HDR treatment is that each dose can be delivered on an outpatient basis with a short administration time providing greater convenience for many patients.

Research shows locally advanced carcinoma of the cervix must be treated with a combination of external beam radiotherapy (EBRT) and intracavity brachytherapy (ICBT).

=== Prostate cancer ===
Brachytherapy to treat prostate cancer can be given either as permanent LDR seed implantation or as temporary HDR brachytherapy.

Permanent seed implantation is suitable for patients with a localised tumour and good prognosis and has been shown to be a highly effective treatment to prevent the cancer from returning. The survival rate is similar to that found with EBRT or surgery (radical prostatectomy), but with fewer side effects such as impotence and incontinence. The procedure can be completed quickly and patients are usually able to go home on the same day of treatment and return to normal activities after one to two days. Permanent seed implantation is often a less invasive treatment option compared to the surgical removal of the prostate.

Temporary HDR brachytherapy is a newer approach to treating prostate cancer, but is currently less common than seed implantation. It is predominantly used to provide an extra dose in addition to EBRT (known as "boost" therapy) as it offers an alternative method to deliver a high dose of radiation therapy that conforms to the shape of the tumour within the prostate, while sparing radiation exposure to surrounding tissues. HDR brachytherapy as a boost for prostate cancer also means that the EBRT course can be shorter than when EBRT is used alone.

=== Breast cancer ===
Radiation therapy is standard of care for women who have undergone lumpectomy or mastectomy surgery, and is an integral component of breast-conserving therapy. Brachytherapy can be used after surgery, before chemotherapy or palliatively in the case of advanced disease. Brachytherapy to treat breast cancer is usually performed with HDR temporary brachytherapy. Post surgery, breast brachytherapy can be used as a "boost" following whole breast irradiation (WBI) using EBRT. More recently, brachytherapy alone is used to deliver APBI (accelerated partial breast irradiation), involving delivery of radiation to only the immediate region surrounding the original tumour.

The main benefit of breast brachytherapy compared to whole breast irradiation is that a high dose of radiation can be precisely applied to the tumour while sparing radiation to healthy breast tissues and underlying structures such as the ribs and lungs. APBI can typically be completed over the course of a week. The option of brachytherapy may be particularly important in ensuring that working women, the elderly or women without easy access to a treatment centre, are able to benefit from breast-conserving therapy due to the short treatment course compared with WBI (which often requires more visits over the course of 1–2 months).

There are five methods that can be used to deliver breast brachytherapy: Interstitial breast brachytherapy, Intracavitary breast brachytherapy, Intraoperative radiation therapy, Permanent Breast Seed Implantation and non-invasive breast brachytherapy using mammography for target localization and an HDR source.

==== Interstitial breast brachytherapy ====
Interstitial breast brachytherapy involves the temporary placement of several flexible plastic catheters in the breast tissue. These are carefully positioned to allow optimal targeting of radiation to the treatment area while sparing the surrounding breast tissue. The catheters are connected to an afterloader, which delivers the planned radiation dose to the treatment area. Interstitial breast brachytherapy can be used as "boost" after EBRT, or as APBI.

==== Intraoperative radiation therapy ====
Intraoperative radiation therapy (IORT) delivers radiation at the same time as the surgery to remove the tumour (lumpectomy). An applicator is placed in the cavity left after tumour removal and a mobile electronic device generates radiation (either x-rays or electrons) and delivers it via the applicator. Radiation is delivered all at once and the applicator removed before closing the incision.

==== Intracavitary breast brachytherapy ====
Intracavitary breast brachytherapy (also known as "balloon brachytherapy") involves the placement of a single catheter into the breast cavity left after the removal of the tumour (lumpectomy). The catheter can be placed at the time of the lumpectomy or postoperatively. Via the catheter, a balloon is then inflated in the cavity. The catheter is then connected to an afterloader, which delivers the radiation dose through the catheter and into the balloon. Currently, intracavitary breast brachytherapy is only routinely used for APBI.

There are also devices that combine the features of interstitial and intracavitary breast brachytherapy (e.g. SAVI). These devices use multiple catheters but are inserted through a single-entry point in the breast. Studies suggest the use of multiple catheters enables physicians to target the radiation more precisely.

==== Permanent breast seed implantation ====
Permanent breast seed implantation (PBSI) implants many radioactive "seeds" (small pellets) into the breast in the area surrounding the site of the tumour, similar to permanent seed prostate brachytherapy. The seeds are implanted in a single 1–2 hour procedure and deliver radiation over the following months as the radioactive material inside them decays. Risk of radiation from the implants to others (e.g. partner/spouse) has been studied and found to be safe.

=== Brain tumors ===
Surgically Targeted Radiation Therapy (STaRT), branded as GammaTile Therapy, is a type of brachytherapy implant specifically designed for use inside the brain. GammaTile is FDA-cleared to treat newly diagnosed, operable malignant intracranial neoplasms (i.e., brain tumors) and operable recurrent intracranial neoplasms, including meningiomas, metastases, high-grade gliomas, and glioblastomas.

In a clinical study, GammaTile Therapy improved local tumor control compared to previous same-site treatments without an increased risk of side effects.

=== Esophageal cancer ===
For esophageal cancer radiation treatment, brachytherapy is one option for effective treatment, involves definitive radiotherapy (boost) or palliative treatments. Definitive radiotherapy (boost) can deliver the dose precisely and palliative treatments can be given to relieve dysphagia. The large diameter applicators or balloon type catheter are used with the afterloader to expand the esophagus and facilitate the delivery of radiation dose to tumor with sparing of nearby normal tissue.

Brachytherapy followed EBRT or surgery have been shown to improve the survival rate and local recurrent rate than EBRT or surgery only for esophageal cancer patients.

=== Skin cancer ===
HDR brachytherapy for nonmelanomatous skin cancer, such as basal cell carcinoma and squamous cell carcinoma, provides an alternative treatment option to surgery. This is especially relevant for cancers on the nose, ears, eyelids or lips, where surgery may cause disfigurement or require extensive reconstruction. Various applicators can be used to ensure close contact between the radiation source(s) and the skin, which conform to the curvature of the skin and help ensure precision delivery of the optimal irradiation dose.

Another type of brachytherapy which has similar advantages as the HDR is provided be the Rhenium-SCT (Skin Cancer Therapy). It makes use of the beta ray emissions of Rhenium-188 to treat basal cell or squamous cell carcinomas. the radiation source is enclosed in a compound which is applied to a thin protective foil directly over the lesion. This way the radiation source can be applied to complex locations and minimize radiation to healthy tissue.

Brachytherapy for skin cancer provides good cosmetic results and clinical efficacy; studies with up to five years follow-up have shown that brachytherapy is highly effective in terms of local control, and is comparable to EBRT. Treatment times are typically short, providing convenience for patients. It has been suggested that brachytherapy may become a standard of treatment for skin cancer in the near future.

=== Blood vessels ===
Brachytherapy can be used in the treatment of coronary in-stent restenosis, in which a catheter is placed inside blood vessels, through which sources are inserted and removed. In treating In-stent restenosis (ISR) Drug Eluting stents (DES) have been found to be superior to Intracoronary Brachytherapy (ICBT). However, there is continued interest in vascular brachytherapy for persistent restenosis in failed stents and vein grafts. The therapy has also been investigated for use in the treatment of peripheral vasculature stenosis and considered for the treatment of atrial fibrillation.

== Side effects ==
The likelihood and nature of potential acute, sub-acute or long-term side-effects associated with brachytherapy depends on the location of the tumour being treated and the type of brachytherapy being used.

=== Acute ===
Acute side effects associated with brachytherapy include localised bruising, swelling, bleeding, discharge or discomfort within the implanted region. These usually resolve within a few days following completion of treatment. Patients may also feel fatigued for a short period following treatment.

Brachytherapy treatment for cervical or prostate cancer can cause acute and transient urinary symptoms such as urinary retention, urinary incontinence or painful urination (dysuria). Transient increased bowel frequency, diarrhoea, constipation or minor rectal bleeding may also occur. Acute and subacute side effects usually resolve over a matter of days or a few weeks. In the case of permanent (seed) brachytherapy for prostate cancer, there is a small chance that some seeds may migrate out of the treatment region into the bladder or urethra and be passed in the urine.

Brachytherapy for skin cancer may result in a shedding of the outer layers of skin (desquamation) around the area of treatment in the weeks following therapy, which typically heals in 5–8 weeks. If the cancer is located on the lip, ulceration may occur as a result of brachytherapy, but usually resolves after 4–6 weeks.

Most of the acute side effects associated with brachytherapy can be treated with medication or through dietary changes, and usually disappear over time (typically a matter of weeks), once the treatment is completed. The acute side effects of HDR brachytherapy are broadly similar to EBRT.

=== Long-term ===
In a small number of people, brachytherapy may cause long-term side effects due to damage or disruption of adjacent tissues or organs. Long-term side effects are usually mild or moderate in nature. For example, urinary and digestive problems may persist as a result of brachytherapy for cervical or prostate cancer, and may require ongoing management.

Brachytherapy for gynecological cancer is estimated to have an 11% risk of unilateral lower limb lymphedema versus a 71% risk when compared to intensity modulated RT (IMRT). Vaginal brachytherapy targets gynecological malignancies with minimal impact to nearby organs and lymph nodes while pelvic external beam radiation targets the malignancy using a wider radiation field that traverses more of the lymphatic system, increasing the risk of lymphatic fibrotic proximal pressure and mechanical insufficiency.

Brachytherapy for prostate cancer may cause erectile dysfunction in approximately 15–30% of patients. However, the risk of erectile dysfunction is related to age (older men are at a greater risk than younger men) and also the level of erectile function prior to receiving brachytherapy. In patients who do experience erectile dysfunction, the majority of cases can successfully be treated with drugs such as Viagra. Importantly, the risk of erectile dysfunction after brachytherapy is less than after radical prostatectomy.

Brachytherapy for breast or skin cancer may cause scar tissue to form around the treatment area. In the case of breast brachytherapy, fat necrosis may occur as a result of fatty acids entering the breast tissues. This can cause the breast tissue to become swollen and tender. Fat necrosis is a benign condition and typically occurs 4–12 months after treatment and affects about 2% of patients.

== Safety around others ==
Patients often ask if they need to have special safety precautions around family and friends after receiving brachytherapy. If temporary brachytherapy is used, no radioactive sources remain in the body after treatment. Therefore, there is no radiation risk to friends or family from being in close proximity with them.

If permanent brachytherapy is used, low dose radioactive sources (seeds) are left in the body after treatment – the radiation levels are very low and decrease over time. In addition, the irradiation only affects tissues within a few millimetres of the radioactive sources (i.e. the tumour being treated). As a precaution, some people receiving permanent brachytherapy may be advised not to hold any small children or be too close to pregnant women for a short time after treatment. Radiation oncologists or nurses can provide specific instructions to patients and advise for how long they need to be careful.

== Types ==
Different types of brachytherapy can be defined according to (1) the placement of the radiation sources in the target treatment area, (2) the rate or 'intensity' of the irradiation dose delivered to the tumour, and (3) the duration of dose delivery.

=== Source placement ===
The two main types of brachytherapy treatment in terms of the placement of the radioactive source are interstitial and contact.

In the case of interstitial brachytherapy, the sources are placed directly in the target tissue of the affected site, such as the prostate or breast.

Contact brachytherapy involves placement of the radiation source in a space next to the target tissue. This space may be a body cavity (intracavitary brachytherapy) such as the cervix, uterus or vagina; a body lumen (intraluminal brachytherapy) such as the trachea or oesophagus; or externally (surface brachytherapy) such as the skin. A radiation source can also be placed in blood vessels (intravascular brachytherapy) for the treatment of coronary in-stent restenosis.

=== Dose rate ===
The dose rate of brachytherapy refers to the level or 'intensity' with which the radiation is delivered to the surrounding medium and is expressed in Grays per hour (Gy/h).

Low-dose rate (LDR) brachytherapy involves implanting radiation sources that emit radiation at a rate of up to 2 Gy·h^{−1}. LDR brachytherapy is commonly used for cancers of the oral cavity, oropharynx, sarcomas and prostate cancer

Medium-dose rate (MDR) brachytherapy is characterized by a medium rate of dose delivery, ranging between 2 Gy·h^{−1} to 12 Gy·h^{−1}.

High-dose rate (HDR) brachytherapy is when the rate of dose delivery exceeds 12 Gy·h^{−1}. The most common applications of HDR brachytherapy are in tumours of the cervix, esophagus, lungs, breasts and prostate. Most HDR treatments are performed on an outpatient basis, but this is dependent on the treatment site.

Pulsed-dose rate (PDR) brachytherapy involves short pulses of radiation, typically once an hour, to simulate the overall rate and effectiveness of LDR treatment. Typical tumour sites treated by PDR brachytherapy are gynaecological and head and neck cancers.

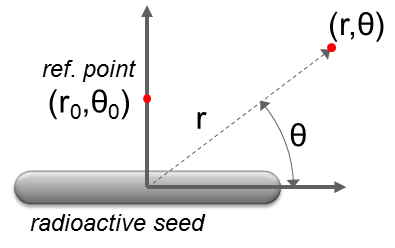
Dose calculation geometry

The calculation of radiation dose from radioactive seeds is crucial in the planning and administration of brachytherapy treatments. Most modern calculation are done using the formalism published by the American Association of Physicists in Medicine. For the geometry in figure 1, this formalism uses five parameters.

- Strength of the source: How much radiation is being emitted by the seed, expressed as air kerma strength and denoted by $S_k$.
- Dose rate of the source: How much dose the seed will deliver to the reference point over a certain period of time, denoted by $\Lambda$.
- Geometry factor: How the shape of the seed will affect the dose at points away from the reference point, denoted by $G(r,\theta)$.
- Anisotropy function: How the much radiation will be stopped before passing out of the seed, denoted by $F(r,\theta)$.
- Radial dose function: How the radiation will interact with the material surrounding the seed, denoted by $g(r)$.

The equation which links these parameters is, $D(r,\theta)=S_k \Lambda \frac{G(r,\theta)}{G(r_0,\theta_0)}g(r)F(r,\theta)$

=== Duration of dose delivery ===
The placement of radiation sources in the target area can be temporary or permanent.

Temporary brachytherapy involves placement of radiation sources for a set duration (usually a number of minutes or hours) before being withdrawn. The specific treatment duration will depend on many different factors, including the required rate of dose delivery and the type, size and location of the cancer. In LDR and PDR brachytherapy, the source typically stays in place up to 24 hours before being removed, while in HDR brachytherapy this time is typically a few minutes.

Permanent brachytherapy, also known as seed implantation, involves placing small LDR radioactive seeds or pellets (about the size of a grain of rice) in the tumour or treatment site and leaving them there permanently to gradually decay. Over a period of weeks or months, the level of radiation emitted by the sources will decline to almost zero. The inactive seeds then remain in the treatment site with no lasting effect. Permanent brachytherapy is most commonly used in the treatment of prostate cancer.

== Procedure ==
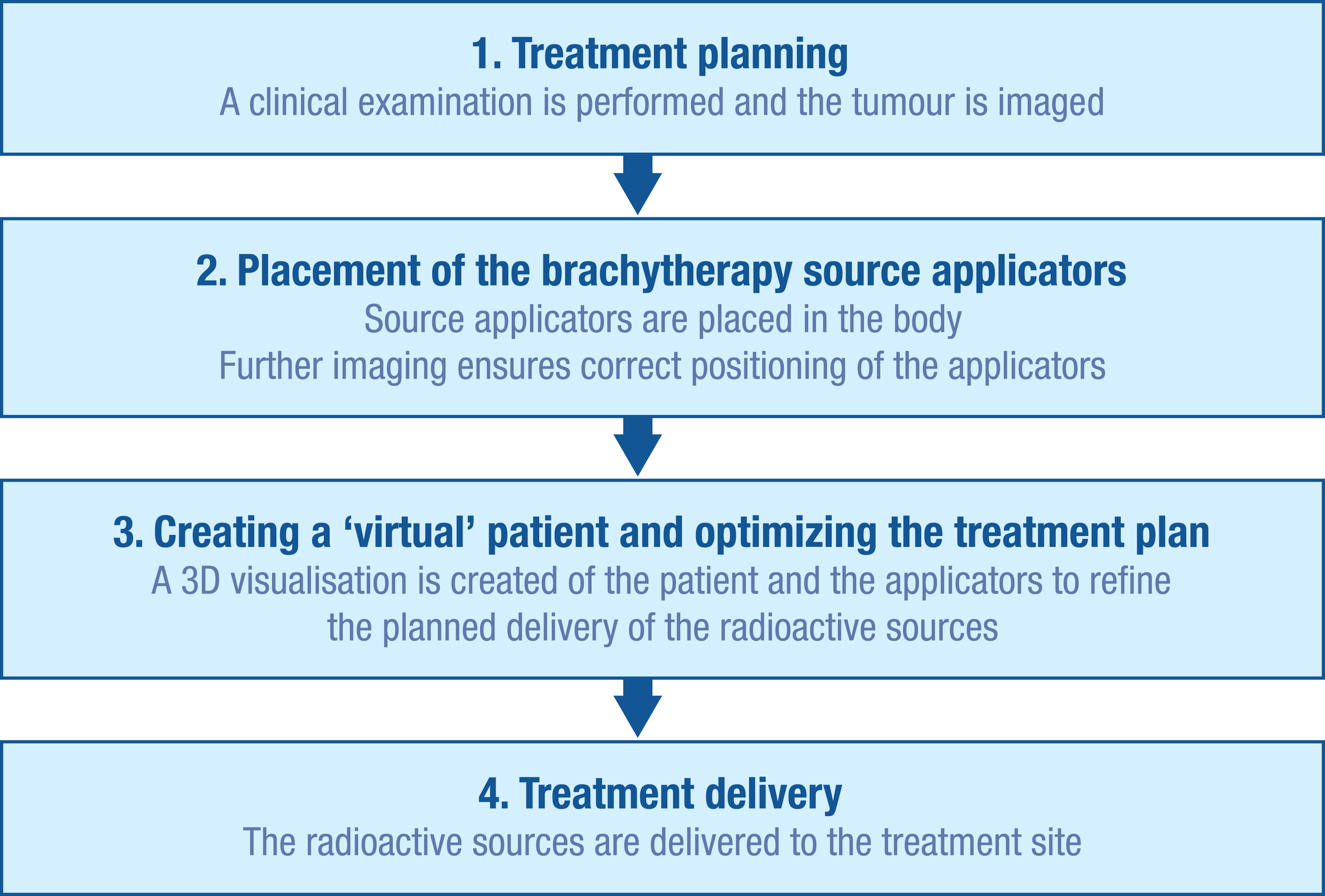
Typical stages of a brachytherapy procedure

=== Initial planning ===
To accurately plan the brachytherapy procedure, a thorough clinical examination is performed to understand the characteristics of the tumour. In addition, a range of imaging modalities can be used to visualise the shape and size of the tumour and its relation to surrounding tissues and organs. These include x-ray radiography, ultrasound, computed axial tomography (CT or CAT) scans, and magnetic resonance imaging (MRI). The data from many of these sources can be used to create a 3D visualisation of the tumour and the surrounding tissues.

Using this information, a plan of the optimal distribution of the radiation sources can be developed. This includes consideration of how the source carriers (applicators), which are used to deliver the radiation to the treatment site, should be placed and positioned. Applicators are non-radioactive and are typically needles or plastic catheters. The specific type of applicator used will depend on the type of cancer being treated and the characteristics of the target tumour.

This initial planning helps to ensure that 'cold spots' (too little irradiation) and 'hot spots' (too much irradiation) are avoided during treatment, as these can respectively result in treatment failure and side-effects.

=== Insertion ===
Before radioactive sources can be delivered to the tumour site, the applicators have to be inserted and correctly positioned in line with the initial planning.

Imaging techniques, such as x-ray, fluoroscopy and ultrasound are typically used to help guide the placement of the applicators to their correct positions and to further refine the treatment plan. CT scans and MRI can also be used. Once the applicators are inserted, they are held in place against the skin using sutures or adhesive tape to prevent them from moving. Once the applicators are confirmed as being in the correct position, further imaging can be performed to guide detailed treatment planning.

=== Creation of a virtual patient ===
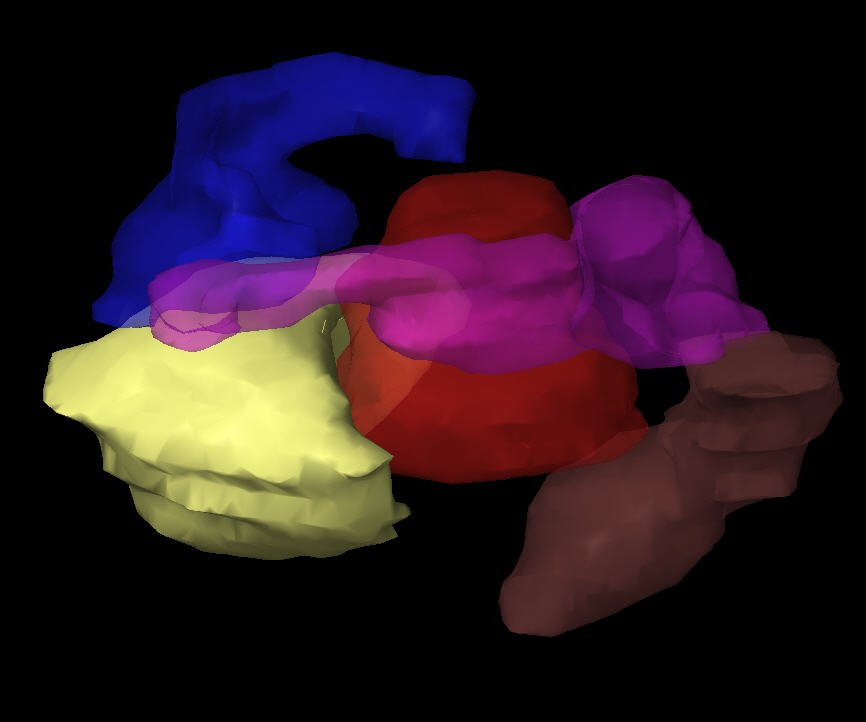
Creation of a virtual patient to plan the delivery of brachytherapy

The images of the patient with the applicators in situ are imported into treatment planning software and the patient is brought into a dedicated shielded room for treatment. The treatment planning software enables multiple 2D images of the treatment site to be translated into a 3D 'virtual patient', within which the position of the applicators can be defined. The spatial relationships between the applicators, the treatment site and the surrounding healthy tissues within this 'virtual patient' are a copy of the relationships in the actual patient.

=== Optimizing the irradiation plan ===
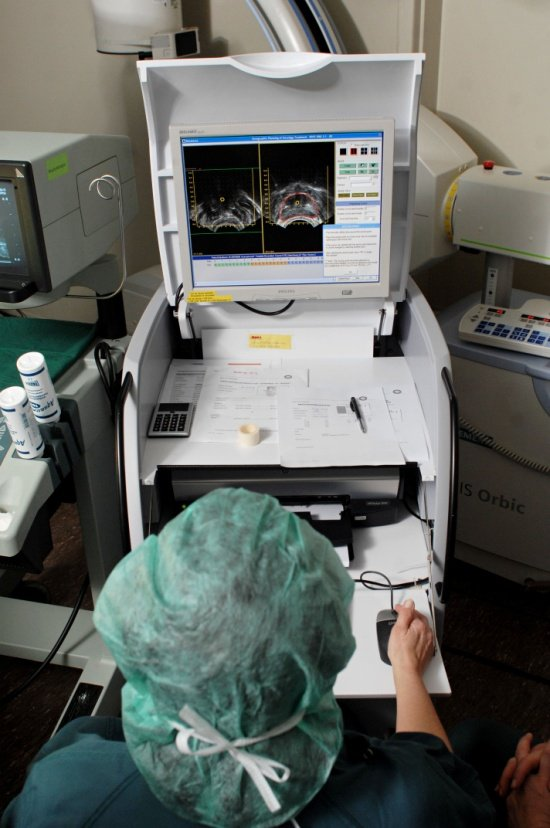
Refinement of the treatment plan during a brachytherapy procedure

To identify the optimal spatial and temporal distribution of radiation sources within the applicators of the implanted tissue or cavity, the treatment planning software allows virtual radiation sources to be placed within the virtual patient. The software shows a graphical representation of the distribution of the irradiation. This serves as a guide for the brachytherapy team to refine the distribution of the sources and provide a treatment plan that is optimally tailored to the anatomy of each patient before actual delivery of the irradiation begins. This approach is sometimes called 'dose-painting'.

=== Treatment delivery ===
The radiation sources used for brachytherapy are always enclosed within a non-radioactive capsule. The sources can be delivered manually, but are more commonly delivered through a technique known as 'afterloading'.

Manual delivery of brachytherapy is limited to a few LDR applications, due to risk of radiation exposure to clinical staff.

In contrast, afterloading involves the accurate positioning of non-radioactive applicators in the treatment site, which are subsequently loaded with the radiation sources. In manual afterloading, the source is delivered into the applicator by the operator.

Remote afterloading systems provide protection from radiation exposure to healthcare professionals by securing the radiation source in a shielded safe. Once the applicators are correctly positioned in the patient, they are connected to an 'afterloader' machine (containing the radioactive sources) through a series of connecting guide tubes. The treatment plan is sent to the afterloader, which then controls the delivery of the sources along the guide tubes into the pre-specified positions within the applicator. This process is only engaged once staff are removed from the treatment room. The sources remain in place for a pre-specified length of time, again following the treatment plan, following which they are returned along the tubes to the afterloader.

On completion of delivery of the radioactive sources, the applicators are carefully removed from the body. Patients typically recover quickly from the brachytherapy procedure, enabling it to often be performed on an outpatient basis.

Between 2003 and 2012 in United States community hospitals, the rate of hospital stays with brachytherapy had a 24.4 percent average annual decrease among adults aged 45–64 years and a 27.3 percent average annual decrease among adults aged 65–84 years. Brachytherapy was the OR procedure with the greatest change in occurrence among hospital stays paid by Medicare and private insurance.

== Radiation sources ==
Commonly used radiation sources (radionuclides) for brachytherapy include:

Radionuclide	Decay mode	Half-life	Energy
Caesium-131 (^{131}Cs)	ε	9.7 days	30.4 keV (mean)
Caesium-137 (^{137}Cs)	β^{−}, γ	30.17 years	0.512, 0.662 MeV γ-rays
Cobalt-60 (^{60}Co)	β^{−}, γ	5.26 years	1.17, 1.33 MeV γ-rays
Iridium-192 (^{192}Ir)	β^{−}, ε, γ	73.8 days	0.38 MeV (mean)
Iodine-125 (^{125}I)	ε	59.6 days	27.4, 31.4 and 35.5 keV
Palladium-103 (^{103}Pd)	ε	17.0 days	21 keV (mean)
Ruthenium-106 (^{106}Ru)	β^{−}	1.02 years	3.54 MeV
Radium-226 (^{226}Ra)	α	1599 years	

== History ==
Brachytherapy dates back to 1901 (shortly after the discovery of radioactivity by Henri Becquerel in 1896) when Pierre Curie suggested to Henri-Alexandre Danlos that a radioactive source could be inserted into a tumour. It was found that the radiation caused the tumour to shrink. Independently, Alexander Graham Bell also suggested the use of radiation in this way. In the early twentieth century, techniques for the application of brachytherapy were pioneered at the Curie institute in Paris by Danlos and at St Luke's and Memorial Hospital in New York by Robert Abbe.

Working with the Curies in their radium research laboratory at the University of Paris, American physicist William Duane refined a technique for extracting radon-222 gas from radium sulfate solutions. Solutions containing 1 gram of radium were "milked" to create radon "seeds" of about 20 millicuries each. These "seeds" were distributed throughout Paris for use in an early form of brachytherapy named endocurietherapy. Duane perfected this "milking" technique during his time in Paris and referred to the device as a "radium cow".

Duane returned to the United States in 1913 and worked in a joint role as assistant professor of physics at Harvard and Research Fellow in Physics of the Harvard Cancer Commission. The Cancer Commission was founded in 1901 and hired Duane to investigate the usage of radium emanations in the treatment of cancer. In 1915 he built Boston's first "radium cow" and thousands of patients were treated with the radon-222 generated from it.

Interstitial radium therapy was common in the 1930s. Gold seeds filled with radon were used as early as 1942 until at least 1958. Gold shells were selected by Gino Failla around 1920 to shield beta rays while passing gamma rays. Cobalt needles were also used briefly after World War II. Radon and cobalt were replaced by radioactive tantalum and gold, before iridium rose in prominence. First used in 1958, iridium has become the most commonly used artificial source for brachytherapy.

Following initial interest in brachytherapy in Europe and the US, its use declined in the middle of the twentieth century due to the problem of radiation exposure to operators from the manual application of the radioactive sources. However, the development of remote afterloading systems, which allow the radiation to be delivered from a shielded safe, and the use of new radioactive sources in the 1950s and 1960s, reduced the risk of unnecessary radiation exposure to the operator and patients. This, together with more recent advancements in three-dimensional imaging modalities, computerised treatment planning systems and delivery equipment has made brachytherapy a safe and effective treatment for many types of cancer.

== Environmental hazards and orphanhood ==
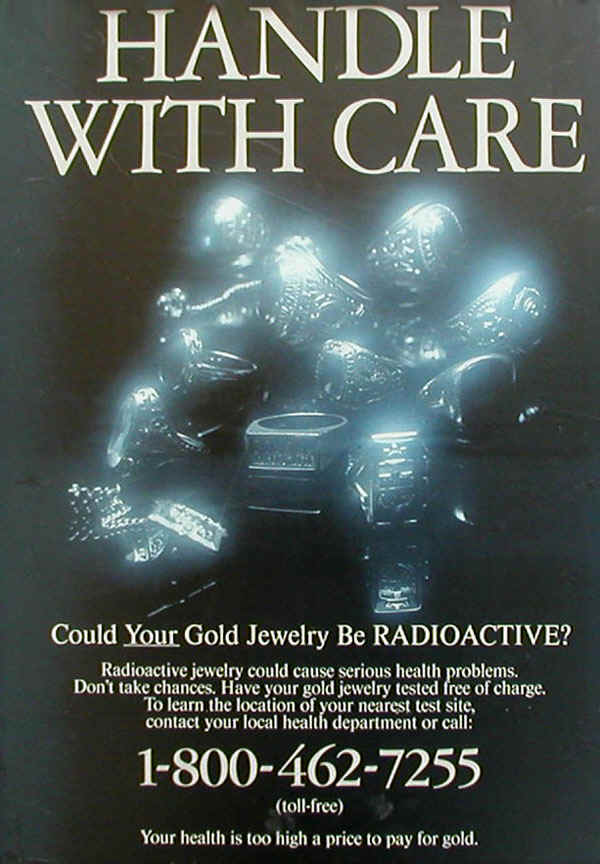
1981 New York Department of Health advertisement for the free radiological testing of gold jewelry contaminated by brachytherapy seeds containing radon-222.

Due to their small size and the poor controls over their fate during the early decades of their use, a significant risk of loss exists for brachytherapy seeds. At least two instances have been recorded of seeds escaping from the tight radiological control under which they are held in hospitals, becoming what are known as orphaned sources.

The first occurred sometime in the 1930s or 1940s, when a number of gold seeds filled with highly radioactive radon-222 were illicitly melted down and mixed with other gold scrap. This scrap gold was contaminated with that isotope's long-lived daughter nuclides: lead-, bismuth- and polonium-210. It was then allowed to enter jewelry production in Upstate New York. At least 144 pieces of jewelry were fabricated using this radioactive gold. Over the following decades there were several instances of fingers that required amputation to save patients from cancers caused by radioactive wedding, engagement and class rings. One Pennsylvania man was reported to have died from metastatic cancer caused by radioactive gold jewelry.

The phenomenon of gold jewelry made from recycled radon seeds retaining their radioactivity had been noted as early as the mid-1930s by Edith Quimby, one of the founders of nuclear medicine. The distribution and serious medical consequences of radioactive gold jewelry had been reported in medical journals as early as April of 1967. Despite this, more than forty years would pass after this batch of gold had been contaminated before New York State's Department of Health took concerted action in February of 1981 to identify jewelry made from the radioactive gold.

The second occurred in Prague, sometime before 2011. In September of that year a computer scientist named Pavel Bykov, who happened to have a small geiger counter built into his wristwatch, noticed abnormal readings in the Podolí neighborhood playground where he had taken his children. After retrieving a larger counter from his home, Bykov determined that a highly radioactive source was buried in the playground. The park was evacuated by authorities soon after. Specialized excavation equipment recovered a 20 x 2mm radium-226 needle from the playground's dirt. The source remained highly radioactive, emitting 500 μSv per hour from a meter away. At that distance the needle gave a per-hour dose equivalent to one year of background exposure.

== See also ==
- External beam radiotherapy
- Prostate brachytherapy
- Targeted intra-operative radiotherapy
- Unsealed source radiotherapy
- Nuclear medicine
- Intraoperative radiation therapy
- Contact X-ray brachytherapy (also called "electronic brachytherapy")
