= Isotopes of tellurium =

Isotopes of tellurium (_{52}Te)
Main isotopes			Decay	
Isotope	abundance	half-life (t_{1/2})	mode	product
^{120}Te	0.09%	stable		
^{121}Te	synth	19.31 d	β^{+}	^{121}Sb
^{121m}Te	synth	164.7 d	IT88.6%	^{121}Te
^{121m}Te	synth	164.7 d	β^{+}11.4%	^{121}Sb
^{122}Te	2.55%	stable		
^{123}Te	0.89%	stable		
^{123m}Te	synth	119.2 d	IT	^{123}Te
^{124}Te	4.74%	stable		
^{125}Te	7.07%	stable		
^{125m}Te	synth	57.40 d	IT	^{125}Te
^{126}Te	18.8%	stable		
^{127m}Te	synth	106.1 d	IT97.9%	^{127}Te
^{127m}Te	synth	106.1 d	β^{−}2.14%	^{127}I
^{128}Te	31.7%	7.7×10^{24} y	β^{−}β^{−}	^{128}Xe
^{129m}Te	synth	33.6 d	IT64%	^{129}Te
^{129m}Te	synth	33.6 d	β^{−}36%	^{129}I
^{130}Te	34.1%	7.9×10^{20} y	β^{−}β^{−}	^{130}Xe

Standard atomic weight A_{r}°(Te)
- 127.60±0.03; 127.60±0.03 (abridged)

Naturally occurring tellurium on Earth consists of eight isotopes: 120, 122-126, 128, 130. The heaviest two have been found to be radioactive: ^{128}Te and ^{130}Te undergo double beta decay with half-lives of, respectively, 7.7×10^{24} years (the longest half-life of all nuclides proven to be radioactive) and 7.9×10^{20} years. Artificial radioisotopes of tellurium are known, with atomic masses that range from 104 to 142, of which the most stable is ^{121}Te with a half-life of 19.31 days. Several nuclear isomers have longer half-lives, the longest being ^{121m}Te with a half-life of 164.7 days.

The very long-lived radioisotopes ^{128}Te and ^{130}Te are the two most common isotopes of tellurium. Of elements with at least one stable isotope, only indium and rhenium likewise have a radioisotope in greater abundance than a stable one.

It has been claimed that electron capture of ^{123}Te was observed, but more recent measurements of the same team have disproved this. They have determined the half-life of ^{123}Te to be longer than 9.2 × 10^{16} years (or 2 × 10^{15} years without any theoretical assumptions). Its observational stability presents one of only two apparent violations of the Mattauch isobar rule, the other involving ^{180m}Ta.

^{124}Te is used as the starting material in the production of certain radionuclides by a cyclotron or other particle accelerator, such as iodine-123 and iodine-124.

With the exception of beryllium, tellurium is the lightest element observed to have isotopes capable of undergoing alpha decay, with isotopes ^{104}Te to ^{109}Te being seen to undergo this mode of decay. Some lighter elements, namely those in the vicinity of ^{8}Be, have isotopes with delayed alpha emission (following proton or beta emission) as a rare branch.

== List of isotopes ==
Nuclide (Note: ^{m}Te – Excited nuclear isomer.)	Z	N	Isotopic mass (Da) (Note: ( ) – Uncertainty (1σ) is given in concise form in parentheses after the corresponding last digits.) (Note: # – Atomic mass marked #: value and uncertainty derived not from purely experimental data, but at least partly from trends from the Mass Surface (TMS).)	Discovery year	Half-life (Note: Bold half-life – nearly stable, half-life longer than age of universe.) (Note: # – Values marked # are not purely derived from experimental data, but at least partly from trends of neighboring nuclides (TNN).)	Decay mode (Note: Modes of decay: EC: / Electron capture; IT: / Isomeric transition; n: / Neutron emission; p: / Proton emission)	Daughter isotope (Note: Bold symbol as daughter – Daughter product is stable.)	Spin and parity (Note: ( ) spin value – Indicates spin with weak assignment arguments.)	Natural abundance (mole fraction)	
Nuclide	Excitation energy			Discovery year	Half-life	Decay mode	Daughter isotope	Spin and parity	Normal proportion	Range of variation
^{104}Te	52	52	103.94672(34)	2018	7.2+2.3 −1.5 ns (Note: This appears reliable but the NUBASE2020 value is <4 ns and the discrepancy is yet to be explained.)	α (Note: The β^{+}-decay partial half-life is predicted as ~380 ms (branching ratio ~1.89×10^{−6}%), along with a negative S(2p) value (indicating a theoretical 2p decay branch).) (Note: Shortest-lived alpha emitter (apart from those in the vicinity of ^{8}Be) known)	^{100}Sn	0+		
^{105}Te	52	53	104.94363(32)#	2006	633(66) ns	α	^{101}Sn	(7/2+)		
^{106}Te	52	54	105.93750(11)	1981	78(11) μs	α	^{102}Sn	0+		
^{107}Te	52	55	106.934868(18)	1979	3.22(9) ms	α (70%)	^{103}Sn	5/2+#		
^{107}Te	52	55	106.934868(18)	1979	3.22(9) ms	β^{+} (30%)	^{107}Sb	5/2+#		
^{108}Te	52	56	107.9293805(58)	1973	2.1(1) s	α (49%)	^{104}Sn	0+		
^{108}Te	52	56	107.9293805(58)	1973	2.1(1) s	β^{+} (48.6%)	^{108}Sb	0+		
^{108}Te	52	56	107.9293805(58)	1973	2.1(1) s	β^{+}, p (2.4%)	^{107}Sn	0+		
^{108}Te	52	56	107.9293805(58)	1973	2.1(1) s	β^{+}, α (<0.065%)	^{104}In	0+		
^{109}Te	52	57	108.9273045(47)	1966	4.4(2) s	β^{+} (86.7%)	^{109}Sb	(5/2+)		
^{109}Te	52	57	108.9273045(47)	1966	4.4(2) s	β^{+}, p (9.4%)	^{108}Sn	(5/2+)		
^{109}Te	52	57	108.9273045(47)	1966	4.4(2) s	α (3.9%)	^{105}Sn	(5/2+)		
^{109}Te	52	57	108.9273045(47)	1966	4.4(2) s	β^{+}, α (<0.0049%)	^{105}In	(5/2+)		
^{110}Te	52	58	109.9224581(71)	1977	18.6(8) s	β^{+}	^{110}Sb	0+		
^{111}Te	52	59	110.9210006(69)	1966	26.2(6) s	β^{+}	^{111}Sb	(5/2)+		
^{111}Te	52	59	110.9210006(69)	1966	26.2(6) s	β^{+}, p (?%)	^{110}Sn	(5/2)+		
^{112}Te	52	60	111.9167278(90)	1976	2.0(2) min	β^{+}	^{112}Sb	0+		
^{113}Te	52	61	112.915891(30)	1974	1.7(2) min	β^{+}	^{113}Sb	(7/2+)		
^{114}Te	52	62	113.912088(26)	1968	15.2(7) min	β^{+}	^{114}Sb	0+		
^{115}Te	52	63	114.911902(30)	1960	5.8(2) min	β^{+}	^{115}Sb	7/2+		
^{115m1}Te (Note: Order of ground state and isomer is uncertain.)	10(6) keV			1974	6.7(4) min	β^{+}	^{115}Sb	(1/2+)		
^{115m2}Te	280.05(20) keV			1972	7.5(2) μs	IT	^{115}Te	11/2−		
^{116}Te	52	64	115.908466(26)	1958	2.49(4) h	β^{+}	^{116}Sb	0+		
^{117}Te	52	65	116.908646(14)	1958	62(2) min	EC (75%)	^{117}Sb	1/2+		
^{117}Te	52	65	116.908646(14)	1958	62(2) min	β^{+} (25%)	^{117}Sb	1/2+		
^{117m}Te	296.1(5) keV			1963	103(3) ms	IT	^{117}Te	(11/2−)		
^{118}Te	52	66	117.905860(20)	1948	6.00(2) d	EC	^{118}Sb	0+		
^{119}Te	52	67	118.9064057(78)	1948	16.05(5) h	EC (97.94%)	^{119}Sb	1/2+		
^{119}Te	52	67	118.9064057(78)	1948	16.05(5) h	β^{+} (2.06%)	^{119}Sb	1/2+		
^{119m}Te	260.96(5) keV			1960	4.70(4) d	EC (99.59%)	^{119}Sb	11/2−		
^{119m}Te	260.96(5) keV			1960	4.70(4) d	β^{+} (0.41%)	^{119}Sb	11/2−		
^{120}Te	52	68	119.9040658(19)	1936	Observationally Stable (Note: Believed to undergo β^{+}β^{+} decay to ^{120}Sn with a half-life over 1.6×10^{21} years)			0+	9(1)×10^{−4}	
^{121}Te	52	69	120.904945(28)	1939	19.31(7) d	β^{+}	^{121}Sb	1/2+		
^{121m}Te	293.974(22) keV			1946	164.7(5) d	IT (88.6%)	^{121}Te	11/2−		
^{121m}Te	293.974(22) keV			1946	164.7(5) d	β^{+} (11.4%)	^{121}Sb	11/2−		
^{122}Te	52	70	121.9030447(15)	1932	Stable			0+	0.0255(12)	
^{123}Te	52	71	122.9042710(15)	1932	Observationally Stable (Note: Believed to undergo electron capture to ^{123}Sb with a half-life over 9.2×10^{16} years)			1/2+	0.0089(3)	
^{123m}Te	247.47(4) keV			1949	119.2(1) d	IT	^{123}Te	11/2−		
^{124}Te	52	72	123.9028183(15)	1932	Stable			0+	0.0474(14)	
^{125}Te (Note: Fission product)	52	73	124.9044312(15)	1931	Stable			1/2+	0.0707(15)	
^{125m}Te	144.775(8) keV			1948	57.40(15) d	IT	^{125}Te	11/2−		
^{126}Te	52	74	125.9033121(15)	1924	Stable			0+	0.1884(25)	
^{127}Te	52	75	126.9052270(15)	1938	9.35(7) h	β^{−}	^{127}I	3/2+		
^{127m}Te	88.23(7) keV			1939	106.1(7) d	IT (97.86%)	^{127}Te	11/2−		
^{127m}Te	88.23(7) keV			1939	106.1(7) d	β^{−} (2.14%)	^{127}I	11/2−		
^{128}Te (Note: Primordial radionuclide)	52	76	127.90446124(76)	1924	7.7(4)×10^{24} y (Note: Longest measured half-life of any nuclide)	β^{−}β^{−}	^{128}Xe	0+	0.3174(8)	
^{128m}Te	2790.8(3) keV			1998	363(27) ns	IT	^{128}Te	(10+)		
^{129}Te	52	77	128.90659642(76)	1939	69.6(3) min	β^{−}	^{129}I	3/2+		
^{129m}Te	105.51(3) keV			1939	33.6(1) d	IT (64%)	^{129}Te	11/2−		
^{129m}Te	105.51(3) keV			1939	33.6(1) d	β^{−} (36%)	^{129}I	11/2−		
^{130}Te	52	78	129.906222745(11)	1924	7.91(21)×10^{20} y	β^{−}β^{−}	^{130}Xe	0+	0.3408(62)	
^{130m1}Te	2146.41(4) keV			1972	186(11) ns	IT	^{130}Te	7−		
^{130m2}Te	2667.2(8) keV			1998	1.90(8) μs	IT	^{130}Te	(10+)		
^{130m3}Te	4373.9(9) keV			(2014) (Note: Half-life shorter than 100ns, not included in discovery database)	53(8) ns	IT	^{130}Te	(15−)		
^{131}Te	52	79	130.908522210(65)	1939	25.0(1) min	β^{−}	^{131}I	3/2+		
^{131m1}Te	182.258(18) keV			1939	32.48(11) h	β^{−} (74.1%)	^{131}I	11/2−		
^{131m1}Te	182.258(18) keV			1939	32.48(11) h	IT (25.9%)	^{131}Te	11/2−		
^{131m2}Te	1940.0(4) keV			1998	93(12) ms	IT	^{131}Te	(23/2+)		
^{132}Te	52	80	131.9085467(37)	1948	3.204(13) d	β^{−}	^{132}I	0+		
^{132m1}Te	1774.80(9) keV			1973	145(8) ns	IT	^{132}Te	6+		
^{132m2}Te	1925.47(9) keV			1973	28.5(9) μs	IT	^{132}Te	7−		
^{132m3}Te	2723.3(8) keV			1979	3.62(6) μs	IT	^{132}Te	(10+)		
^{133}Te	52	81	132.9109633(22)	1940	12.5(3) min	β^{−}	^{133}I	3/2+#		
^{133m1}Te	334.26(4) keV			1965	55.4(4) min	β^{−} (83.5%)	^{133}I	(11/2−)		
^{133m1}Te	334.26(4) keV			1965	55.4(4) min	IT (16.5%)	^{133}Te	(11/2−)		
^{133m2}Te	1610.4(5) keV			2001	100(5) ns	IT	^{133}Te	(19/2−)		
^{134}Te	52	82	133.9113964(29)	1948	41.8(8) min	β^{−}	^{134}I	0+		
^{134m}Te	1691.34(16) keV			1970	164.5(7) ns	IT	^{134}Te	6+		
^{135}Te	52	83	134.9165547(18)	1969	19.0(2) s	β^{−}	^{135}I	(7/2−)		
^{135m}Te	1554.89(16) keV			1980	511(20) ns	IT	^{135}Te	(19/2−)		
^{136}Te	52	84	135.9201012(24)	1974	17.63(9) s	β^{−} (98.63%)	^{136}I	0+		
^{136}Te	52	84	135.9201012(24)	1974	17.63(9) s	β^{−}, n (1.37%)	^{135}I	0+		
^{137}Te	52	85	136.9255994(23)	1975	2.49(5) s	β^{−} (97.06%)	^{137}I	3/2−#		
^{137}Te	52	85	136.9255994(23)	1975	2.49(5) s	β^{−}, n (2.94%)	^{136}I	3/2−#		
^{138}Te	52	86	137.9294725(41)	1975	1.46(25) s	β^{−} (95.20%)	^{138}I	0+		
^{138}Te	52	86	137.9294725(41)	1975	1.46(25) s	β^{−}, n (4.80%)	^{137}I	0+		
^{139}Te	52	87	138.9353672(38)	1994	724(81) ms	β^{−}	^{139}I	5/2−#		
^{140}Te	52	88	139.939487(15)	1994	351(5) ms	β^{−} (?%)	^{140}I	0+		
^{140}Te	52	88	139.939487(15)	1994	351(5) ms	β^{−}, n (?%)	^{139}I	0+		
^{141}Te	52	89	140.94560(43)#	1994	193(16) ms	β^{−}	^{141}I	5/2−#		
^{142}Te	52	90	141.95003(54)#	1994	147(8) ms	β^{−}	^{142}I	0+		
^{143}Te	52	91	142.95649(54)#	2010	120(8) ms	β^{−}	^{143}I	7/2+#		
^{144}Te	52	92	143.96112(32)#	2015	93(60) ms	β^{−}	^{144}I	0+		
^{145}Te	52	93	144.96778(32)#	2018	75# ms [>550 ns]	β^{−}	^{145}I			
This table header & footer:

== See also ==
Daughter products other than tellurium

- Isotopes of xenon
- Isotopes of iodine
- Isotopes of antimony
- Isotopes of tin
- Isotopes of indium
