= Charles Pecher =

Belgian physician

- Born: 26 November 1913; Antwerp, Belgium
- Died: 28 August 1941 (aged 27); Joliette, Canada
- Citizenship: Belgium
- Education: Université libre de Bruxelles
- Known for: Nuclear medicine

Charles Pecher (26 November 1913 – 28 August 1941) was a Belgian pioneer in nuclear medicine. He discovered and introduced strontium-89 in medical therapeutic procedures in 1939.

He was the first to report a possible therapeutic role for the beta emitting radionuclide strontium-89 in the palliation of bone pain associated with metastatic bone disease. His autoradiographies of animals or organs after administration of strontium-89 or phosphorus-32 started the development of bone scintigraphy.

The groundbreaking work of Pecher was forgotten for decades due to the classification of information linked to the Manhattan project. The therapeutic use of ^{89}Sr was only approved in 1993 for the palliative treatment of breast and prostate cancers metastatic to the bones for use in the US and became the first bone-seeking radiopharmaceutical that came into widespread use.

== Biography ==
Born in Antwerp on 26 November 1913, Pecher was the son of the liberal politician Édouard Pecher and Emilie Speth. After secondary studies at the Koninklijk Atheneum Antwerpen (1932), he continued with a university education in both physics and medicine. He became assistant of professor Pierre Rylant at the Université libre de Bruxelles, where he specialized in biophysics. Pecher pioneered in fundamental neurophysiology through his evidence of random processes in the nervous system. He received his doctor's degree in 1939.

His medical studies were awarded the Armand Kleefeld Prize and earned him a scholarship from the Belgian American Educational Foundation to continue his research in the United States. On 1 August 1939, Pecher married fellow researcher Jacqueline Van Halteren (31 May 1915 – 16 September 2013) and the couple traveled to the US the following month.

Pecher first worked at Harvard University with Edwin Cohn and George Kistiakowsky. In 1940, he was appointed Research Fellow in the Radiation Laboratory at the University of California, Berkeley.

After two intense years, Pecher became entangled in the Second World War. In 1940 the Belgian Government in exile decided to raise a military unit from pre-war Belgian émigrés and soldiers rescued from Dunkirk and called up all Belgian nationals worldwide to join the Free Belgian Forces. A battalion was formed in Canada from Belgian émigrés in the Americas.

Pecher saw himself faced with a choice between his patriotic duty and his scientific calling, with the complicating factor of American pressure to remain in work in a domain whose military relevance was fully recognized, with all the secrecy that this entails. In the end, Pecher responded to his convocation for the Belgian army in the United Kingdom. In Joliette, where he was supposed to board for Europe, he died on 28 August 1941. A verdict of suicide was derived from the high dose of barbiturates in his body. His daughter Evelyne was born two months later.

== Work ==
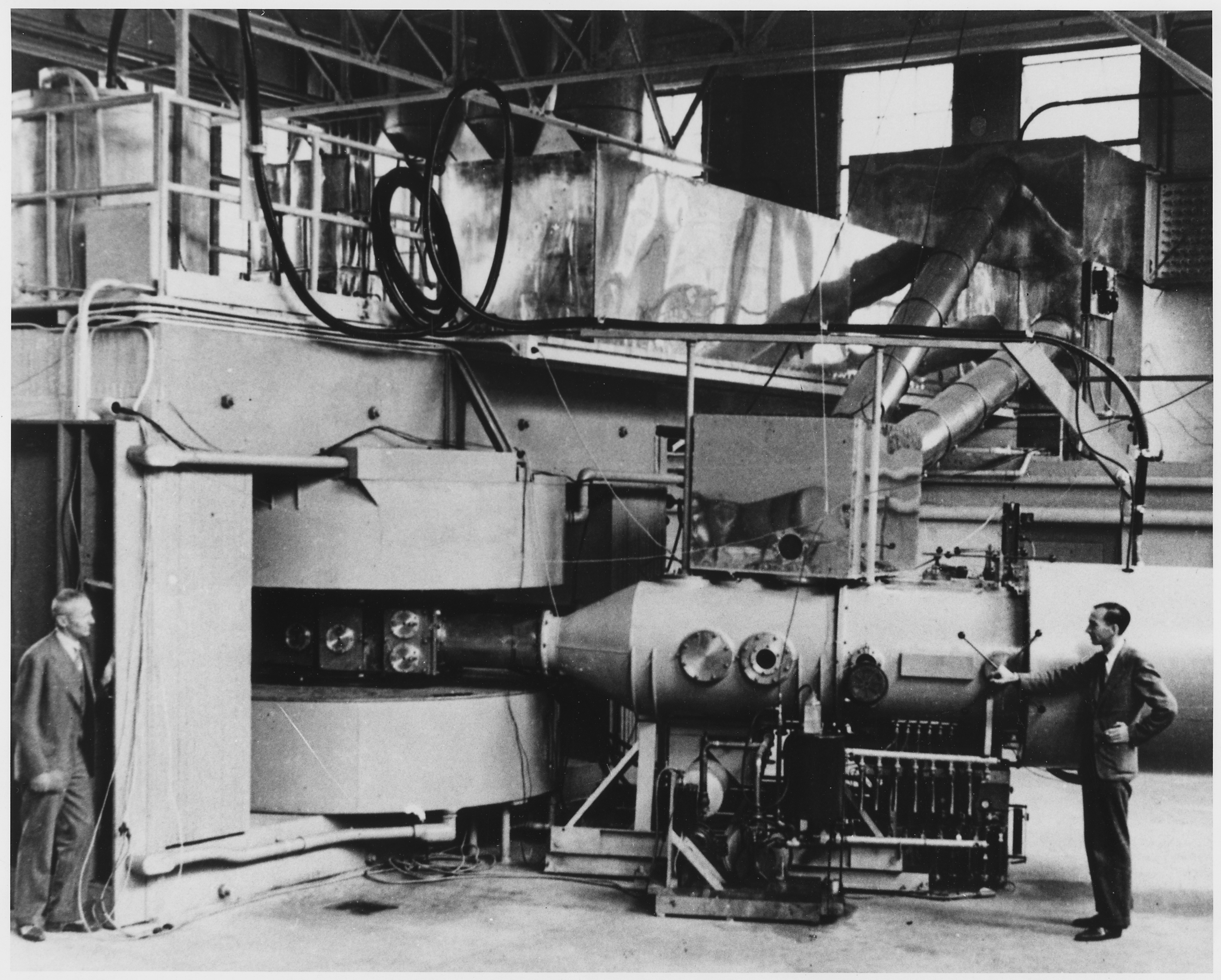
60-inch cyclotron at the University of California Lawrence Radiation Laboratory, Berkeley, in August, 1939

Between 1938 and 1940, Ernest O. Lawrence and William M. Brobeck developed and built a 60-Inch cyclotron, which accelerated deuterons to 19 MeV, the first cyclotron capable of producing medically useful radioisotopes. It was housed in the Crocker Laboratory. In 1940, Pecher was appointed Research Fellow in the Radiation Laboratory of Ernest O. Lawrence at the University of California, Berkeley, where he produced radioisotopes in the cyclotron under the supervision of John H. Lawrence and used them as radioactive tracers.

The bones are largely composed of calcium and phosphorus in the form of tricalcium phosphate. W. Wesley Campbell and David M. Greenberg and later Pecher demonstrated using radioactive tracers that calcium is almost entirely stored in the bones with small traces being distributed in the soft tissues. For this reason, the metabolism of calcium attracted very early the interest of physicians looking for applying radioisotopes of calcium for therapeutic purposes.

Pecher predicted and then demonstrated that strontium, which belongs to the same group in the periodic table, was absorbed by the human body in a manner similar to calcium.

His work with strontium-89, a calcium analogue, eventually led to its administration to a terminal patient with osteoblastic metastases from a metastatic carcinoma of the prostate. A posthumously published autoradiography of an amputated leg with strontium-89 is the first human bone scintigraphy. It was the third medical radioisotope, after phosphorus-32 and iodine-131 introduced respectively by John H. Lawrence and Joseph G. Hamilton. Pecher demonstrated using two cows the Sr-89 transfer to milk. Pecher filed a patent in May 1941 for the synthesis of strontium-89 and yttrium-86 using cyclotrons and described the use of strontium for therapeutic uses. The groundbreaking work of Pecher was forgotten for decades due to the classification of information linked to the Manhattan project and the American nuclear weapons program. While ^{89}Sr with a half-life of 50.6 days is used to treat bone cancer, ^{90}Sr is an isotope of concern, with a half-life of 28.90 years, following a fallout from nuclear weapons and nuclear accidents as it's a common fission product. Its presence in bones can cause bone cancer, cancer of nearby tissues, and leukemia.

United States Atomic Energy Commission commissioned in 1949 an investigation, codenamed Project GABRIEL, to gauge the impact of radioactive fallout resulting from nuclear warfare. It surmised that the radioactive isotope strontium-90 (Sr-90) represented the most serious threat to human health from nuclear fallout. This resulted in the commissioning of Project SUNSHINE, which sought to examine the long-term effects of nuclear radiation on the biosphere due to repeated nuclear detonations of increasing yield. Project SUNSHINE sought to measure the global dispersion of Sr-90 by measuring its concentration in the tissues and bones of the dead. Of particular interest was tissue from the young, whose developing bones have the highest propensity to accumulate Sr-90 and thus the highest susceptibility to radiation damage. SUNSHINE elicited a great deal of controversy when it was revealed that many of the remains sampled were utilized without prior permission from the deceased or from relatives of the dead, which wasn't known until many years later.

The seminal contribution of Pecher on the therapeutic use of ^{89}Sr was “rediscovered” in the United States in 1976 by Marshall Brucer, former Chairman of the Medical Division of Oak Ridge Institute of Nuclear Studies. In 1973, two German physicians Nosrat Firusian and Carl G. Schmidt rediscovered, independently from Pecher's work, the therapeutic use of ^{89}Sr for the treatment of incurable pain in patients with neoplastic osseous infiltrations. Although not citing Pecher's work, Firusian and Schmidt referred to a 1950 article of John Lawrence and Robert H. Wasserman, in which they stated that "Radioactive strontium has been shown to behave similarly to calcium in the body" citing a 1941 paper of Pecher.

This palliative treatment for breast and prostate cancers metastatic to the bones was only approved by the Food and Drug Administration in 1993 for use in the US under the commercial name "Metastron", in the form of injectable strontium chloride, produced by Amersham International and became the first bone-seeking radiopharmaceutical that came into widespread use.

Before leaving for Canada, Pecher filled a patent for a method of transmitting secret messages with radioactive invisible ink.
