= Pecher =

Pecher is a surname. Notable people with the surname include:

- Charles Pecher (1913–1941), Belgian physician
- Doris Pecher (born 1966), German diver
- Édouard Pecher (1885–1926), Belgian lawyer and politician
- Steve Pecher (born 1956), American soccer player
