= Strontium-89 =

Isotope of strontium

General
- Symbol: ^{89}Sr
- Names: strontium-89
- Protons (Z): 38
- Neutrons (N): 51

Nuclide data
- Natural abundance: syn
- Half-life (t_{1/2}): 50.56 d
- Decay products: ^{89}Y

Decay modes
- Decay mode: Decay energy (MeV)
- Beta decay: 1.501

Strontium-89 (^{89}Sr) is a radioactive isotope of strontium with a half-life of 50.56 days. It undergoes β^{−} decay (with practically no gamma rays) into yttrium-89. Strontium-89 has application in medicine. It is also a fission product, but is produced technically by neutron capture on ordinary strontium.

== History ==
Strontium-89 was first synthesized in 1937 by D. W. Stewart et al. at the University of Michigan; it was synthesized via irradiation of stable strontium (the ^{88}Sr isotope) with deuterons. Biological properties and applications of strontium-89 were studied for the first time by Belgian scientist Charles Pecher. Pecher filed a patent in May 1941 for the synthesis of strontium-89 and yttrium-86 using cyclotrons, and described the therapeutic use of strontium.

== Physiological effects and medical use ==
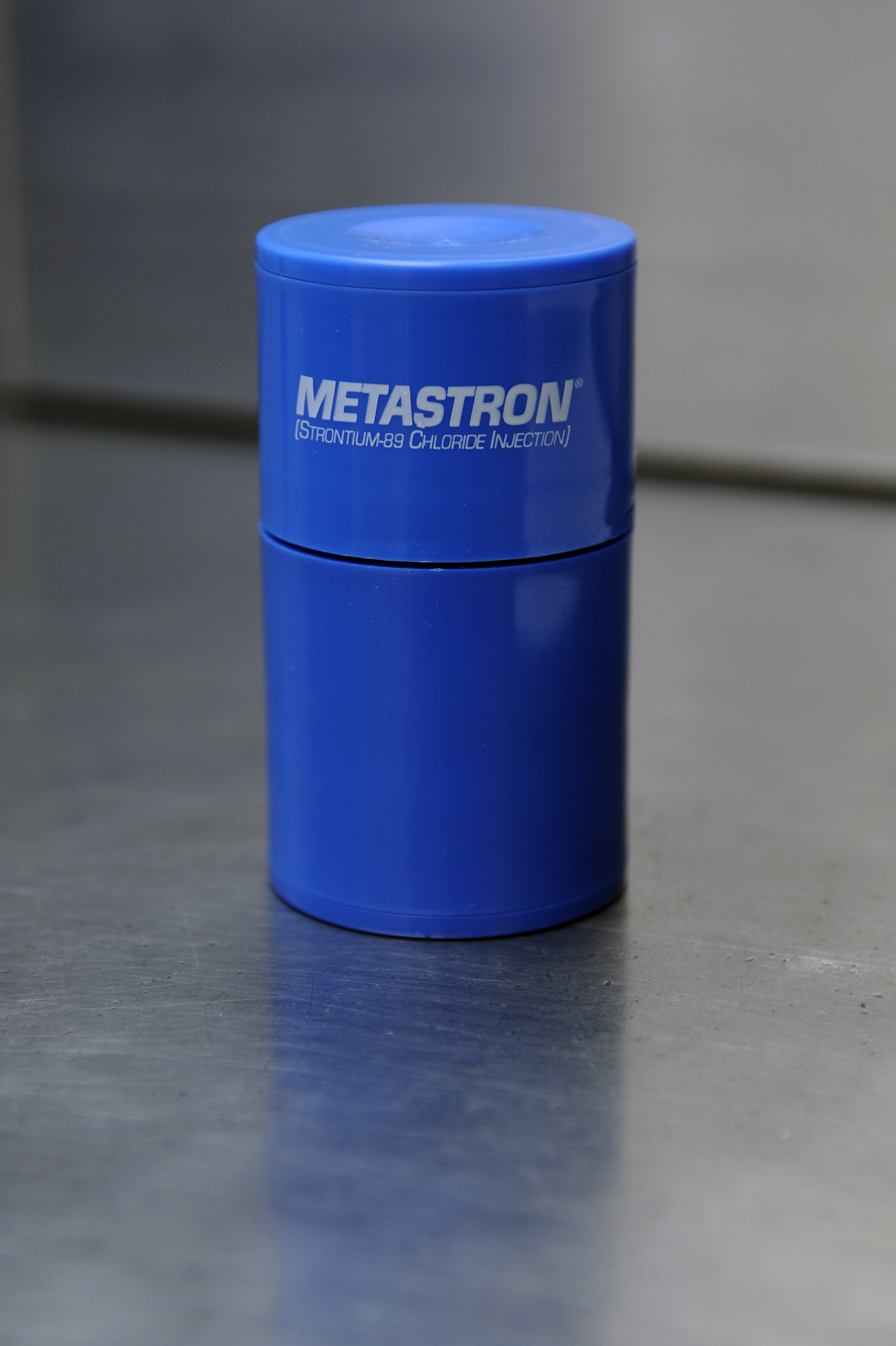
Metastron, a preparation of strontium-89 chloride made by GE Healthcare and used for purposes such as prostate cancer treatment.

Strontium belongs to the same periodic family as calcium (alkaline earth metals), and is metabolised in a similar fashion, preferentially targeting metabolically active regions of the bone. ^{89}Sr is an artificial radioisotope used in the treatment of osseous (bony) metastases of bone cancer.

In circumstances where cancer patients have widespread and painful bony metastases, the administration of ^{89}Sr results in the delivery of beta particles directly to the area of bony problem, where calcium turnover is greatest. Consequently, intravenous or intracavity administration of ^{89}Sr may be helpful in the palliation of painful bony metastases, as it allows radiation to be targeted at metastatic lesions, inducing apoptosis of cells, membrane and protein damage. Subsequently, bone pain resulting from cytokine release at the site of lesions, bone-associated nerve compression and stretching of the periosteum may be reduced. Treatment with ^{89}Sr has been particularly effective in patients with hormonally-resistant prostate cancer, often leading to a decreased requirement for opioid analgesics, an increase in time until further radiation is needed, and a decrease in tumour markers.

== See also ==
- Isotopes of strontium
- Alpharadin, radium-223 with similar clinical use
