= Isotopes of molybdenum =

Isotopes of molybdenum (_{42}Mo)
Main isotopes			Decay	
Isotope	abundance	half-life (t_{1/2})	mode	product
^{92}Mo	14.7%	stable		
^{93}Mo	synth	4839 y	ε	^{93}Nb
^{94}Mo	9.19%	stable		
^{95}Mo	15.9%	stable		
^{96}Mo	16.7%	stable		
^{97}Mo	9.58%	stable		
^{98}Mo	24.3%	stable		
^{99}Mo	synth	65.932 h	β^{−}	^{99m}Tc
^{100}Mo	9.74%	7.07×10^{18} y	β^{−}β^{−}	^{100}Ru

Standard atomic weight A_{r}°(Mo)
- 95.95±0.01; 95.95±0.01 (abridged)

Molybdenum (_{42}Mo) has seven isotopes in nature, with atomic masses of 92, 94-98, and 100. All are stable except ^{100}Mo, which undergoes double beta decay with a half-life of 7.07×10^{18} years (the shortest known for this mode) to ^{100}Ru. ^{92}Mo and ^{98}Mo are also energetically able to decay in this manner, to zirconium and ruthenium respectively; the others are theoretically stable. There are also a total of 32 synthetic isotopes known, and at least 13 metastable nuclear isomers, ranging in atomic mass from 81 to 119.

The isotopes with mass 93 or lower decay by electron capture or positron emission to niobium isotopes (or zirconium after delayed proton emission); those with mass 99 or higher by ordinary beta decay to technetium. The most stable of the former are ^{93}Mo, recently measured to have a half-life around 4800 years, and ^{90}Mo at 5.56 hours. The most stable of the latter is the medically important ^{99}Mo, half-life 65.932 hours, and whose decay leads to the chief isotope of technetium. By far the most stable isomer is ^{93m1}Mo at 6.85 hours, decaying to its ground state.

== List of isotopes ==
Nuclide (Note: ^{m}Mo – Excited nuclear isomer.)	Z	N	Isotopic mass (Da) (Note: ( ) – Uncertainty (1σ) is given in concise form in parentheses after the corresponding last digits.) (Note: # – Atomic mass marked #: value and uncertainty derived not from purely experimental data, but at least partly from trends from the Mass Surface (TMS).)	Discovery year	Half-life (Note: Bold half-life – nearly stable, half-life longer than age of universe.)	Decay mode (Note: Modes of decay: EC: / Electron capture; IT: / Isomeric transition; n: / Neutron emission; p: / Proton emission)	Daughter isotope (Note: Bold symbol as daughter – Daughter product is stable.)	Spin and parity (Note: ( ) spin value – Indicates spin with weak assignment arguments.) (Note: # – Values marked # are not purely derived from experimental data, but at least partly from trends of neighboring nuclides (TNN).)	Natural abundance (mole fraction)	
Nuclide	Excitation energy			Discovery year	Half-life	Decay mode	Daughter isotope	Spin and parity	Normal proportion	Range of variation
^{81}Mo	42	39	80.96623(54)#	2017	1# ms [>400 ns]	β^{+}, p?	^{80}Zr	5/2+#		
^{82}Mo	42	40	81.95666(43)#	2017	30# ms [>400 ns]	β^{+}?	^{82}Nb	0+		
^{82}Mo	42	40	81.95666(43)#	2017	30# ms [>400 ns]	β^{+}, p?	^{81}Zr	0+		
^{83}Mo	42	41	82.95025(43)#	1999	23(19) ms	β^{+}	^{83}Nb	3/2−#		
^{83}Mo	42	41	82.95025(43)#	1999	23(19) ms	β^{+}, p?	^{82}Zr	3/2−#		
^{84}Mo	42	42	83.941882(24)	1991	2.3(3) s	β^{+}	^{84}Nb	0+		
^{84}Mo	42	42	83.941882(24)	1991	2.3(3) s	β^{+}, p?	^{83}Zr	0+		
^{85}Mo	42	43	84.938261(17)	1992	3.2(2) s	β^{+} (99.86%)	^{85}Nb	(1/2+)		
^{85}Mo	42	43	84.938261(17)	1992	3.2(2) s	β^{+}, p (0.14%)	^{84}Zr	(1/2+)		
^{86}Mo	42	44	85.931174(3)	1991	19.1(3) s	β^{+}	^{86}Nb	0+		
^{87}Mo	42	45	86.928196(3)	1977	14.1(3) s	β^{+} (85%)	^{87}Nb	7/2+#		
^{87}Mo	42	45	86.928196(3)	1977	14.1(3) s	β^{+}, p (15%)	^{86}Zr	7/2+#		
^{87m}Mo	310(30) keV			2023				(1/2−)		
^{88}Mo	42	46	87.921968(4)	1971	8.0(2) min	β^{+}	^{88}Nb	0+		
^{89}Mo	42	47	88.919468(4)	1980	2.11(10) min	β^{+}	^{89}Nb	(9/2+)		
^{89m}Mo	387.5(2) keV			1980	190(15) ms	IT	^{89}Mo	(1/2−)		
^{90}Mo	42	48	89.913931(4)	1953	5.56(9) h	β^{+}	^{90}Nb	0+		
^{90m}Mo	2874.73(15) keV			1971	1.14(5) μs	IT	^{90}Mo	8+		
^{91}Mo	42	49	90.911745(7)	1938	15.49(1) min	β^{+}	^{91}Nb	9/2+		
^{91m}Mo	653.01(9) keV			1949	64.6(6) s	IT (50.0%)	^{91}Mo	1/2−		
^{91m}Mo	653.01(9) keV			1949	64.6(6) s	β^{+} (50.0%)	^{91}Nb	1/2−		
^{92}Mo	42	50	91.90680715(17)	1930	Observationally Stable (Note: Believed to decay by β^{+}β^{+} to ^{92}Zr with a half-life over 1.9×10^{20} y)			0+	0.14649(106)	
^{92m}Mo	2760.52(14) keV			1964	190(3) ns	IT	^{92}Mo	8+		
^{93}Mo	42	51	92.90680877(19)	1946	4839(63) y	EC (95.7%)	^{93m1}Nb	5/2+		
^{93}Mo	42	51	92.90680877(19)	1946	4839(63) y	EC (4.3%)	^{93}Nb	5/2+		
^{93m1}Mo	2424.95(4) keV			1950	6.85(7) h	IT (99.88%)	^{93}Mo	21/2+		
^{93m1}Mo	2424.95(4) keV			1950	6.85(7) h	β^{+} (0.12%)	^{93}Nb	21/2+		
^{93m2}Mo	9695(17) keV			2005	1.8(10) μs	IT	^{93}Mo	(39/2−)		
^{94}Mo	42	52	93.90508359(15)	1930	Stable			0+	0.09187(33)	
^{95}Mo (Note: Fission product)	42	53	94.90583744(13)	1930	Stable			5/2+	0.15873(30)	
^{96}Mo	42	54	95.90467477(13)	1930	Stable			0+	0.16673(8)	
^{97}Mo	42	55	96.90601690(18)	1930	Stable			5/2+	0.09582(15)	
^{98}Mo	42	56	97.90540361(19)	1930	Observationally Stable (Note: Believed to decay by β^{−}β^{−} to ^{98}Ru with a half-life of over 1×10^{14} years)			0+	0.24292(80)	
^{99}Mo (Note: Used to produce the medically useful radioisotope technetium-99m)	42	57	98.90770730(25)	1938	65.932(5) h	β^{−}	^{99m}Tc	1/2+		
^{99m1}Mo	97.785(3) keV			1958	15.5(2) μs	IT	^{99}Mo	5/2+		
^{99m2}Mo	684.10(19) keV			1975	760(60) ns	IT	^{99}Mo	11/2−		
^{100}Mo (Note: Primordial radionuclide)	42	58	99.9074680(3)	1930	7.07(14)×10^{18} y	β^{−}β^{−}	^{100}Ru	0+	0.09744(65)	
^{101}Mo	42	59	100.9103376(3)	1941	14.61(3) min	β^{−}	^{101}Tc	1/2+		
^{101m1}Mo	13.497(9) keV			1991	226(7) ns	IT	^{101}Mo	3/2+		
^{101m2}Mo	57.015(11) keV			1991	133(70) ns	IT	^{101}Mo	5/2+		
^{102}Mo	42	60	101.910294(9)	1954	11.3(2) min	β^{−}	^{102}Tc	0+		
^{103}Mo	42	61	102.913092(10)	1963	67.5(15) s	β^{−}	^{103}Tc	3/2+		
^{104}Mo	42	62	103.913747(10)	1962	60(2) s	β^{−}	^{104}Tc	0+		
^{105}Mo	42	63	104.9169798(23)	1962	36.3(8) s	β^{−}	^{105}Tc	(5/2−)		
^{106}Mo	42	64	105.9182732(98)	1969	8.73(12) s	β^{−}	^{106}Tc	0+		
^{107}Mo	42	65	106.9221198(99)	1972	3.5(5) s	β^{−}	^{107}Tc	(1/2+)		
^{107m}Mo	65.4(2) keV			1999	445(21) ns	IT	^{107}Mo	(5/2+)		
^{108}Mo	42	66	107.9240475(99)	1972	1.105(10) s	β^{−} (>99.5%)	^{108}Tc	0+		
^{108}Mo	42	66	107.9240475(99)	1972	1.105(10) s	β^{−}, n (<0.5%)	^{107}Tc	0+		
^{109}Mo	42	67	108.928438(12)	1992	700(14) ms	β^{−} (98.7%)	^{109}Tc	(1/2+)		
^{109}Mo	42	67	108.928438(12)	1992	700(14) ms	β^{−}, n (1.3%)	^{108}Tc	(1/2+)		
^{109m}Mo	69.7(5) keV			2012	210(60) ns	IT	^{109}Mo	5/2+#		
^{110}Mo	42	68	109.930718(26)	1992	292(7) ms	β^{−} (98.0%)	^{110}Tc	0+		
^{110}Mo	42	68	109.930718(26)	1992	292(7) ms	β^{−}, n (2.0%)	^{109}Tc	0+		
^{111}Mo	42	69	110.935652(14)	1994	193.6(44) ms	β^{−} (>88%)	^{111}Tc	1/2+#		
^{111}Mo	42	69	110.935652(14)	1994	193.6(44) ms	β^{−}, n (<12%)	^{110}Tc	1/2+#		
^{111m}Mo	100(50)# keV			2011	~200 ms	β^{−}	^{111}Tc	7/2−#		
^{111m}Mo	100(50)# keV			2011	~200 ms	β^{−}, n?	^{110}Tc	7/2−#		
^{112}Mo	42	70	111.93829(22)#	1994	125(5) ms	β^{−}	^{112}Tc	0+		
^{112}Mo	42	70	111.93829(22)#	1994	125(5) ms	β^{−}, n?	^{111}Tc	0+		
^{113}Mo	42	71	112.94348(32)#	1994	80(2) ms	β^{−}	^{113}Tc	5/2+#		
^{113}Mo	42	71	112.94348(32)#	1994	80(2) ms	β^{−}, n?	^{112}Tc	5/2+#		
^{114}Mo	42	72	113.94667(32)#	1997	58(2) ms	β^{−}	^{114}Tc	0+		
^{114}Mo	42	72	113.94667(32)#	1997	58(2) ms	β^{−}, n?	^{113}Tc	0+		
^{115}Mo	42	73	114.95217(43)#	2010	45.5(20) μs	β^{−}	^{115}Tc	3/2+#		
^{115}Mo	42	73	114.95217(43)#	2010	45.5(20) μs	β^{−}, n?	^{114}Tc	3/2+#		
^{115}Mo	42	73	114.95217(43)#	2010	45.5(20) μs	β^{−}, 2n?	^{113}Tc	3/2+#		
^{115m}Mo	198 keV			2022	46(3) ns	IT	^{115}Mo			
^{116}Mo	42	74	115.95576(54)#	2010	32(4) ms	β^{−}	^{116}Tc	0+		
^{116}Mo	42	74	115.95576(54)#	2010	32(4) ms	β^{−}, n?	^{115}Tc	0+		
^{116}Mo	42	74	115.95576(54)#	2010	32(4) ms	β^{−}, 2n?	^{114}Tc	0+		
^{117}Mo	42	75	116.96169(54)#	2010	22(5) ms	β^{−}	^{117}Tc	3/2+#		
^{117}Mo	42	75	116.96169(54)#	2010	22(5) ms	β^{−}, n?	^{116}Tc	3/2+#		
^{117}Mo	42	75	116.96169(54)#	2010	22(5) ms	β^{−}, 2n?	^{115}Tc	3/2+#		
^{118}Mo	42	76	117.96525(54)#	2015	21(6) ms	β^{−}	^{118}Tc	0+		
^{118}Mo	42	76	117.96525(54)#	2015	21(6) ms	β^{−}, n?	^{117}Tc	0+		
^{118}Mo	42	76	117.96525(54)#	2015	21(6) ms	β^{−}, 2n?	^{116}Tc	0+		
^{119}Mo	42	77	118.97147(32)#	2018	12# ms [>550 ns]	β^{−}?	^{119}Tc	3/2+#		
^{119}Mo	42	77	118.97147(32)#	2018	12# ms [>550 ns]	β^{−}, n?	^{118}Tc	3/2+#		
^{119}Mo	42	77	118.97147(32)#	2018	12# ms [>550 ns]	β^{−}, 2n?	^{117}Tc	3/2+#		
This table header & footer:

== ^{99}Molybdenum ==
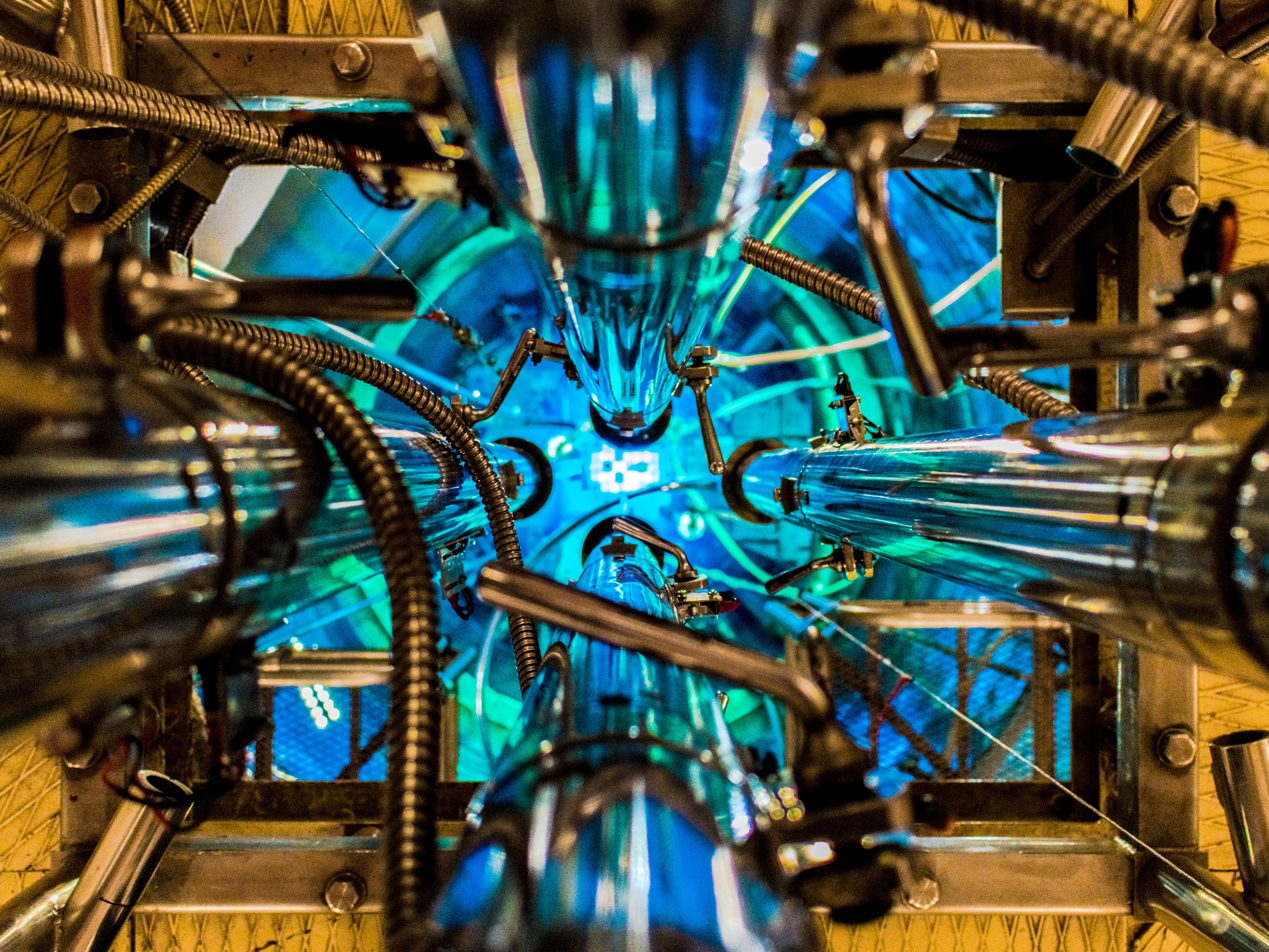
Overhead view of the RA-3 research reactor pool (CNEA, Argentina) during molybdenum-99 production

Molybdenum-99 is produced commercially by intense neutron-bombardment (i.e. fission) of a highly purified uranium-235 target, followed rapidly by extraction. It is used as a parent radioisotope in technetium-99m generators to produce the even shorter-lived daughter isotope technetium-99m, which is used in approximately 40 million medical procedures annually.

A common misunderstanding is that ^{99}Mo is used in diagnostic medical scans, when actually it has no role in the imaging agent or the scan. In fact, ^{99}Mo co-eluted with the ^{99m}Tc (also known as breakthrough) is considered a contaminant and is minimised to adhere to the appropriate USP (or equivalent) standards. The IAEA recommends that ^{99}Mo concentrations exceeding more than 0.15 μCi/mCi ^{99m}Tc or 0.015% should not be administered to humans. Typically, quantification of ^{99}Mo breakthrough is performed for every elution when using a ^{99}Mo/^{99m}Tc generator during quality assurance/control testing.

Alternative routes for generating ^{99}Mo do not require a fissionable target, such as high or low enriched uranium (i.e., HEU or LEU). These include accelerator-based methods, such as proton bombardment or photoneutron reactions on enriched ^{100}Mo targets. Historically, ^{99}Mo generated by neutron capture on natural isotopic molybdenum or enriched ^{98}Mo targets was used for the development of commercial ^{99}Mo/^{99m}Tc generators.

The neutron-capture process was eventually superseded by fission-based ^{99}Mo that could be generated with much higher specific activities. Implementing feed-stocks of high specific activity ^{99}Mo solutions thus allowed for higher quality production and better separations of ^{99m}Tc from ^{99}Mo on small alumina column using chromatography. Employing low-specific activity ^{99}Mo under similar conditions is problematic in that either higher Mo loading capacities or larger columns are required for accommodating equivalent amounts of ^{99}Mo. Chemically speaking, this phenomenon occurs due to the presence of other Mo isotopes that compete for surface site interactions on the column substrate. In turn, low-specific activity ^{99}Mo usually requires much larger column sizes and longer separation times, and usually yields ^{99m}Tc accompanied by unsatisfactory amounts of the parent radioisotope when using γ-alumina as the column substrate. Ultimately, the inferior end-product ^{99m}Tc generated under these conditions makes it essentially unuseable.

In the last decade, cooperative agreements between the US government and private firms resurrected neutron capture production for commercially distributed ^{99}Mo/^{99m}Tc. The return to neutron-capture-based ^{99}Mo was accompanied by the implementation of novel separation methods that support low-specific activity ^{99}Mo.

== See also ==
Daughter products other than molybdenum

- Isotopes of technetium
- Isotopes of niobium
- Isotopes of zirconium
