= Isora =

Isora may refer to:

- 1374 Isora, an asteroid
- Artemis Isora, in Greek Mythology
- Azumi-no-isora, a Japanese Deity
- Helicteres isora, or Indian screw tree
- Isora (beetle), a ladybird beetle genus

== See also ==
- Išorai, a village in Kaunas County, Lithuania
- IsoRay, a medical company
