= Isotopes of zirconium =

Isotopes of zirconium (_{40}Zr)
Main isotopes			Decay	
Isotope	abundance	half-life (t_{1/2})	mode	product
^{88}Zr	synth	83.4 d	ε	^{88}Y
^{89}Zr	synth	78.36 h	β^{+}	^{89}Y
^{90}Zr	51.5%	stable		
^{91}Zr	11.2%	stable		
^{92}Zr	17.1%	stable		
^{93}Zr	trace	1.61×10^{6} y	β^{−}	^{93}Nb
^{94}Zr	17.4%	stable		
^{95}Zr	synth	64.032 d	β^{−}	^{95}Nb
^{96}Zr	2.80%	2.1×10^{19} y	β^{−}β^{−}	^{96}Mo
^{96}Zr	2.80%	2.1×10^{19} y	β^{−}	^{96}Nb

Standard atomic weight A_{r}°(Zr)
- 91.222±0.003; 91.222±0.003 (abridged)

Naturally occurring zirconium (_{40}Zr) is composed of four stable isotopes (one, ^{94}Zr, may in the future be found radioactive), and one very long-lived radioisotope (^{96}Zr), a primordial nuclide that decays via double beta decay with an observed partial half-life of 2.34 × 10^{19} years; it can also undergo single beta decay, with a partial half-life of [2.27^{+0.53}_{−0.36} (stat) ± 0.27 (syst)] × 10^{20} years. The second most stable radioisotope is ^{93}Zr, which has a half-life of 1.61 million years. Thirty other radioisotopes have been observed from ^{77}Zr to ^{114}Zr; all have half-lives less than a day except for ^{95}Zr (64.032 days), ^{88}Zr (83.4 days), and ^{89}Zr (78.36 hours). The most stable of the isomeric states is just 4.16 minutes for ^{89m}Zr.

Radioactive isotopes above the theoretically stable mass numbers 90–92 decay by electron emission resulting in niobium isotopes, whereas those below by positron emission or electron capture, resulting in yttrium isotopes.

== List of isotopes ==
Nuclide (Note: ^{m}Zr – Excited nuclear isomer.)	Z	N	Isotopic mass (Da) (Note: ( ) – Uncertainty (1σ) is given in concise form in parentheses after the corresponding last digits.) (Note: # – Atomic mass marked #: value and uncertainty derived not from purely experimental data, but at least partly from trends from the Mass Surface (TMS).)	Discovery year	Half-life (Note: Bold half-life – nearly stable, half-life longer than age of universe.) (Note: # – Values marked # are not purely derived from experimental data, but at least partly from trends of neighboring nuclides (TNN).)	Decay mode	Daughter isotope (Note: Bold symbol as daughter – Daughter product is stable.)	Spin and parity (Note: ( ) spin value – Indicates spin with weak assignment arguments.)	Natural abundance (mole fraction)	
Nuclide	Excitation energy			Discovery year	Half-life	Decay mode	Daughter isotope	Spin and parity	Normal proportion	Range of variation
^{77}Zr	40	37	76.96608(43)#	2017	100# μs			3/2−#		
^{78}Zr	40	38	77.95615(43)#	2001	50# ms [>200 ns]			0+		
^{79}Zr	40	39	78.94979(32)#	1999	56(30) ms	β^{+}	^{79}Y	5/2+#		
^{80}Zr	40	40	79.940818(86)	1987	4.6(6) s	β^{+}	^{80}Y	0+		
^{81}Zr	40	41	80.938211(11)	1997	5.5(4) s	β^{+} (99.88%)	^{81}Y	(3/2−)		
^{81}Zr	40	41	80.938211(11)	1997	5.5(4) s	β^{+}, p (0.12%)	^{80}Sr	(3/2−)		
^{82}Zr	40	42	81.9317075(17)	1982	32(5) s	β^{+}	^{82}Y	0+		
^{83}Zr	40	43	82.92923591(70)	1974	42(2) s	β^{+}	^{83}Y	1/2−#		
^{83}Zr	40	43	82.92923591(70)	1974	42(2) s	β^{+}, p (?%)	^{82}Sr	1/2−#		
^{83m1}Zr	52.72(5) keV			1988	0.53(12) μs	IT	^{83}Zr	(5/2−)		
^{83m2}Zr	77.04(7) keV			1988	1.8(1) μs	IT	^{83}Zr	(7/2+)		
^{84}Zr	40	44	83.9233257(59)	1977	25.8(5) min	β^{+}	^{84}Y	0+		
^{85}Zr	40	45	84.9214432(69)	1963	7.86(4) min	β^{+}	^{85}Y	(7/2+)		
^{85m}Zr	292.2(3) keV			1976	10.9(3) s	IT (?%)	^{85}Zr	1/2−#		
^{85m}Zr	292.2(3) keV			1976	10.9(3) s	β^{+} (?%)	^{85}Y	1/2−#		
^{86}Zr	40	46	85.9162968(38)	1951	16.5(1) h	β^{+}	^{86}Y	0+		
^{87}Zr	40	47	86.9148173(45)	1949	1.68(1) h	β^{+}	^{87}Y	9/2+		
^{87m}Zr	335.84(19) keV			1972	14.0(2) s	IT	^{87}Zr	1/2−		
^{88}Zr (Note: Second most powerful known neutron absorber)	40	48	87.9102207(58)	1951	83.4(3) d	EC	^{88}Y	0+		
^{88m}Zr	2887.79(6) keV			1971	1.320(25) μs	IT	^{88}Zr	8+		
^{89}Zr	40	49	88.9088798(30)	1938	78.360(23) h	β^{+}	^{89}Y	9/2+		
^{89m}Zr	587.82(10) keV			1940	4.161(10) min	IT (93.77%)	^{89}Zr	1/2−		
^{89m}Zr	587.82(10) keV			1940	4.161(10) min	β^{+} (6.23%)	^{89}Y	1/2−		
^{90}Zr (Note: Fission product)	40	50	89.90469876(13)	1924	Stable			0+	0.5145(4)	
^{90m1}Zr	2319.000(9) keV			1963	809.2(20) ms	IT	^{90}Zr	5-		
^{90m2}Zr	3589.418(15) keV			1959	131(4) ns	IT	^{90}Zr	8+		
^{91}Zr	40	51	90.90564021(10)	1934	Stable			5/2+	0.1122(5)	
^{91m}Zr	3167.3(4) keV			1975	4.35(14) μs	IT	^{91}Zr	(21/2+)		
^{92}Zr	40	52	91.90503534(10)	1924	Stable			0+	0.1715(3)	
^{93}Zr (Note: Long-lived fission product)	40	53	92.90647066(49)	1950	1.61(5)×10^{6} y	β^{−} (73%)	^{93m1}Nb	5/2+		
^{93}Zr	40	53	92.90647066(49)	1950	1.61(5)×10^{6} y	β^{−} (27%)	^{93}Nb	5/2+		
^{94}Zr	40	54	93.90631252(18)	1924	Observationally stable (Note: Believed to decay by β^{−}β^{−} to ^{94}Mo with a half-life over 1.1×10^{17} years)			0+	0.1738(4)	
^{95}Zr	40	55	94.90804028(93)	1946	64.032(6) d	β^{−}	^{95}Nb	5/2+		
^{96}Zr (Note: Primordial radionuclide)	40	56	95.90827762(12)	1934	2.1(2)×10^{19} y	β^{−}β^{−} (91%)	^{96}Mo	0+	0.0280(2)	
^{96}Zr	40	56	95.90827762(12)	1934	2.1(2)×10^{19} y	β^{−} (9%)	^{96}Nb	0+	0.0280(2)	
^{97}Zr	40	57	96.91096380(13)	1951	16.749(8) h	β^{−}	^{97m}Nb	1/2+		
^{97m}Zr	1264.35(16) keV			1985	104.8(17) ns	IT	^{97}Zr	7/2+		
^{98}Zr	40	58	97.9127404(91)	1967	30.7(4) s	β^{−}	^{98}Nb	0+		
^{98m}Zr	6601.9(11) keV			2006	1.9(2) μs	IT	^{98}Zr	(17−)		
^{99}Zr	40	59	98.916675(11)	1970	2.1(1) s	β^{−}	^{99m}Nb	1/2+		
^{99m}Zr	251.96(9) keV			1970	336(5) ns	IT	^{99}Zr	7/2+		
^{100}Zr	40	60	99.9180105(87)	1970	7.1(4) s	β^{−}	^{100}Nb	0+		
^{101}Zr	40	61	100.9214585(89)	1970	2.29(8) s	β^{−}	^{101}Nb	3/2+		
^{102}Zr	40	62	101.9231542(94)	1970	2.01(8) s	β^{−}	^{102}Nb	0+		
^{103}Zr	40	63	102.9272041(99)	1987	1.38(7) s	β^{−} (>99%)	^{103}Nb	(5/2−)		
^{103}Zr	40	63	102.9272041(99)	1987	1.38(7) s	β^{−}, n (<1%)	^{102}Nb	(5/2−)		
^{104}Zr	40	64	103.929449(10)	1990	920(28) ms	β^{−} (>99%)	^{104}Nb	0+		
^{104}Zr	40	64	103.929449(10)	1990	920(28) ms	β^{−}, n (<1%)	^{103}Nb	0+		
^{105}Zr	40	65	104.934022(13)	1992	670(28) ms	β^{−} (>98%)	^{105}Nb	1/2+#		
^{105}Zr	40	65	104.934022(13)	1992	670(28) ms	β^{−}, n (<2%)	^{104}Nb	1/2+#		
^{106}Zr	40	66	105.93693(22)#	1994	179(6) ms	β^{−} (>98%)	^{106}Nb	0+		
^{106}Zr	40	66	105.93693(22)#	1994	179(6) ms	β^{−}, n (<2%)	^{105}Nb	0+		
^{107}Zr	40	67	106.94201(32)#	1994	145.7(24) ms	β^{−} (>77%)	^{107}Nb	5/2+#		
^{107}Zr	40	67	106.94201(32)#	1994	145.7(24) ms	β^{−}, n (<23%)	^{106}Nb	5/2+#		
^{108}Zr	40	68	107.94530(43)#	1997	78.5(20) ms	β^{−}	^{108}Nb	0+		
^{108m}Zr	2074.5(8) keV			2011	540(30) ns	IT	^{108}Zr	(6+)		
^{109}Zr	40	69	108.95091(54)#	1997	56(3) ms	β^{−}	^{109}Nb	5/2+#		
^{110}Zr	40	70	109.95468(54)#	1997	37.5(20) ms	β^{−}	^{110}Nb	0+		
^{111}Zr	40	71	110.96084(64)#	2010	24.0(5) ms	β^{−}	^{111}Nb	5/2+#		
^{111m}Zr	265 keV			2022	100(70) ns	IT	^{111}Zr			
^{112}Zr	40	72	111.96520(75)#	2010	43(21) ms	β^{−}	^{112}Nb	0+		
^{113}Zr	40	73	112.97172(32)#	2018	15# ms [>550 ns]			3/2+		
^{114}Zr	40	74		2021				0+		
This table header & footer:

== Zirconium-88 ==
^{88}Zr is a radioisotope of zirconium with a half-life of 83.4 days. In January 2019, this isotope was discovered to have a thermal neutron capture cross section of approximately 861,000 barns; this is several orders of magnitude greater than predicted, and greater than that of any other nuclide except xenon-135.

== Zirconium-89 ==
^{89}Zr is a radioisotope of zirconium with a half-life of 78.36 hours, produced by proton irradiation of natural yttrium (^{89}Y). Its most prominent gamma photon (99% of decays) has an energy of 909 keV and it emits a positron (as opposed to electron capture) about 23% of decays. Zirconium-89 is employed in specialized diagnostic applications using positron emission tomography imaging, for example, with zirconium-89 labeled antibodies (immuno-PET).

== Zirconium-93 ==
Yield, % per fission
	Thermal	Fast	14 MeV
^{232}Th	not fissile	6.70 ± 0.40	5.58 ± 0.16
^{233}U	6.979 ± 0.098	6.94 ± 0.07	5.38 ± 0.32
^{235}U	6.346 ± 0.044	6.25 ± 0.04	5.19 ± 0.31
^{238}U	not fissile	4.913 ± 0.098	4.53 ± 0.13
^{239}Pu	3.80 ± 0.03	3.82 ± 0.03	3.0 ± 0.3
^{241}Pu	2.98 ± 0.04	2.98 ± 0.33	?

Long-lived fission products
Nuclide	t_{1/2}	Yield	Q (Note: Decay energy is split among β, neutrino, and γ if any.)	βγ
	(Ma)	(%) (Note: Per 65 thermal neutron fissions of ^{235}U and 35 of ^{239}Pu.)	(keV)	
^{99}Tc	0.211	6.1385	294	β
^{126}Sn	0.23	0.1084	4050 (Note: Has decay energy 380 keV, but its decay product ^{126}Sb has decay energy 3.67 MeV.)	βγ
^{79}Se	0.33	0.0447	151	β
^{135}Cs	1.33	6.9110 (Note: Lower in thermal reactors because ^{135}Xe, its predecessor, readily absorbs neutrons.)	269	β
^{93}Zr	1.61	5.4575	91	βγ
^{107}Pd	6.5	1.2499	33	β
^{129}I	16.1	0.8410	194	βγ

^{93}Zr is a radioisotope of zirconium with a half-life of 1.61 million years, decaying through emission of a low-energy beta particle. 73% of decays populate an excited state of niobium-93, which decays with a half-life of 13.9 years (almost entirely by internal conversion, emitting no gamma ray) to the stable ground state of ^{93}Nb, while the remaining 27% of decays directly populate the ground state. It is one of the 7 long-lived fission products. The low specific activity and low energy of its radiation limit the radioactive hazards of this isotope, and its insolubility makes it unlikely to escape a waste repository; all these are shared with palladium-107.

Nuclear fission produces it at a fission yield of 6.3% (thermal neutron fission of ^{235}U), one of the most abundant fission products. Nuclear reactors usually contain large amounts of zirconium as fuel rod cladding (see zircalloy), and neutron irradiation of ^{92}Zr also produces some ^{93}Zr, though this is limited by ^{92}Zr's low neutron capture cross section of 0.22 barns. Indeed, one of the primary reasons for using zirconium in fuel rod cladding is its low cross section.

^{93}Zr also has a low neutron capture cross section of 0.7 barns. Most fission zirconium consists of other isotopes; the other isotope with a significant neutron absorption cross section is ^{91}Zr with a cross section of 1.24 barns. ^{93}Zr is a less attractive candidate for disposal by nuclear transmutation than are ^{99}Tc and ^{129}I. The isotope could be recycled: if the effect on the neutron economy of ^{93}Zr's higher cross section is deemed acceptable, irradiated cladding and fission product zirconium (which are mixed together in most current nuclear reprocessing methods) could be used to form new zircalloy cladding. Once the cladding is inside the reactor, the relatively low level radioactivity can be tolerated, but transport and manufacturing might require precautions not now taken.

== See also ==
Daughter products other than zirconium

- Isotopes of molybdenum
- Isotopes of niobium
- Isotopes of yttrium
- Isotopes of strontium
