= Isotopes of caesium =

Isotopes of caesium (_{55}Cs)
Main isotopes			Decay	
Isotope	abundance	half-life (t_{1/2})	mode	product
^{131}Cs	synth	9.69 d	ε	^{131}Xe
^{133}Cs	100%	stable		
^{134}Cs	synth	2.0650 y	β^{−}	^{134}Ba
^{134}Cs	synth	2.0650 y	ε	^{134}Xe
^{135}Cs	trace	1.33×10^{6} y	β^{−}	^{135}Ba
^{137}Cs	synth	30.04 y	β^{−}	^{137}Ba

Standard atomic weight A_{r}°(Cs)
- 132.90545196±0.00000006; 132.91±0.01 (abridged)

Caesium (_{55}Cs) has 41 known isotopes, ranging in mass number from 112 to 152. Only one isotope, ^{133}Cs, is stable. The longest-lived radioisotopes are ^{135}Cs with a half-life of 1.33 million years, ^{137}Cs with a half-life of 30.04 years and ^{134}Cs with a half-life of 2.0650 years. All other isotopes have half-lives less than 2 weeks, most under an hour.

Caesium is an abundant fission product (135 and 137 are directly produced) and various isotopes are of concern as such, see the sections below.

Beginning in 1945 with the commencement of nuclear testing, caesium radioisotopes were released into the atmosphere, where caesium is absorbed readily into solution and is returned to the surface of the Earth as a component of radioactive fallout. Once caesium enters the ground water, it is deposited on soil surfaces and removed from the landscape primarily by particle transport. As a result, the input function of these isotopes can be estimated as a function of time.

== List of isotopes ==
Nuclide (Note: ^{m}Cs – Excited nuclear isomer.)	Z	N	Isotopic mass (Da) (Note: ( ) – Uncertainty (1σ) is given in concise form in parentheses after the corresponding last digits.) (Note: # – Atomic mass marked #: value and uncertainty derived not from purely experimental data, but at least partly from trends from the Mass Surface (TMS).)	Discovery year	Half-life	Decay mode (Note: Modes of decay: EC: / Electron capture; IT: / Isomeric transition; n: / Neutron emission; p: / Proton emission)	Daughter isotope (Note: Bold italics symbol as daughter – Daughter product is nearly stable.) (Note: Bold symbol as daughter – Daughter product is stable.)	Spin and parity (Note: ( ) spin value – Indicates spin with weak assignment arguments.) (Note: # – Values marked # are not purely derived from experimental data, but at least partly from trends of neighboring nuclides (TNN).)	Isotopic abundance
Nuclide	Excitation energy			Discovery year	Half-life	Decay mode	Daughter isotope	Spin and parity	Isotopic abundance
^{112}Cs	55	57	111.950155(64)	1994	490(30) μs	p (>99.74%)	^{111}Xe	1+#	
^{112}Cs	55	57	111.950155(64)	1994	490(30) μs	α (<0.26%)	^{108}I	1+#	
^{113}Cs	55	58	112.9444285(92)	1984	16.94(9) μs	p	^{112}Xe	(3/2+)	
^{114}Cs	55	59	113.941292(91)	1978	570(20) ms	β^{+} (91.1%)	^{114}Xe	(1+)	
^{114}Cs	55	59	113.941292(91)	1978	570(20) ms	β^{+}, p (8.7%)	^{113}I	(1+)	
^{114}Cs	55	59	113.941292(91)	1978	570(20) ms	β^{+}, α (0.19%)	^{110}Te	(1+)	
^{114}Cs	55	59	113.941292(91)	1978	570(20) ms	α (0.018%)	^{110}I	(1+)	
^{115}Cs	55	60	114.93591(11)#	1978	1.4(8) s	β^{+} (99.93%)	^{115}Xe	9/2+#	
^{115}Cs	55	60	114.93591(11)#	1978	1.4(8) s	β^{+}, p (0.07%)	^{114}I	9/2+#	
^{116}Cs	55	61	115.93340(11)#	1975	700(40) ms	β^{+} (99.67%)	^{116}Xe	(1+)	
^{116}Cs	55	61	115.93340(11)#	1975	700(40) ms	β^{+}, p (0.28%)	^{115}I	(1+)	
^{116}Cs	55	61	115.93340(11)#	1975	700(40) ms	β^{+}, α (0.049%)	^{112}Te	(1+)	
^{116m}Cs (Note: Order of ground state and isomer is uncertain.)	100(60)# keV			1977	3.85(13) s	β^{+} (99.56%)	^{116}Xe	(7+)	
^{116m}Cs	100(60)# keV			1977	3.85(13) s	β^{+}, p (0.44%)	^{115}I	(7+)	
^{116m}Cs	100(60)# keV			1977	3.85(13) s	β^{+}, α (0.0034%)	^{112}Te	(7+)	
^{117}Cs	55	62	116.928617(67)	1972	8.4(6) s	β^{+}	^{117}Xe	9/2+#	
^{117m}Cs	150(80)# keV			1986	6.5(4) s	β^{+}	^{117}Xe	3/2+#	
^{118}Cs	55	63	117.926560(14)	1969	14(2) s	β^{+} (99.98%)	^{118}Xe	2(−)	
^{118}Cs	55	63	117.926560(14)	1969	14(2) s	β^{+}, p (0.021%)	^{117}I	2(−)	
^{118}Cs	55	63	117.926560(14)	1969	14(2) s	β^{+}, α (0.0012%)	^{114}Te	2(−)	
^{118m1}Cs	X keV			1977	17(3) s	β^{+} (99.98%)	^{118}Xe	(7−)	
^{118m1}Cs	X keV			1977	17(3) s	β^{+}, p (0.021%)	^{117}I	(7−)	
^{118m1}Cs	X keV			1977	17(3) s	β^{+}, α (0.0012%)	^{114}Te	(7−)	
^{118m2}Cs	Y keV			(2021) (Note: Half-life not measured, not included in discovery database)				(6+)	
^{118m3}Cs	65.9 keV			(2021)		IT	^{118}Cs	(3−)	
^{118m4}Cs	125.9+X keV			2021	550(60) ns	IT	^{118m1}Cs	(7+)	
^{118m5}Cs	195.2+X keV			(2021)	<500 ns	IT	^{118m4}Cs	(8+)	
^{119}Cs	55	64	118.9223 77(15)	1969	43.0(2) s	β^{+}	^{119}Xe	9/2+	
^{119}Cs	55	64	118.9223 77(15)	1969	43.0(2) s	β^{+}, α (<2×10^{−6}%)	^{115}Te	9/2+	
^{119m1}Cs	50(30)# keV			1978	30.4(1) s	β^{+}	^{119}Xe	3/2+	
^{119m2}Cs	110.0(7)# keV			2021	55(5) μs	IT	^{119}Cs	11/2−	
^{120}Cs	55	65	119.920677(11)	1969	60.4(6) s	β^{+}	^{120}Xe	2+	
^{120}Cs	55	65	119.920677(11)	1969	60.4(6) s	β^{+}, α (<2×10^{−5}%)	^{116}Te	2+	
^{120}Cs	55	65	119.920677(11)	1969	60.4(6) s	β^{+}, p (<7×10^{−6}%)	^{119}I	2+	
^{120m}Cs	100(60)# keV			1977	57(6) s	β^{+}	^{120}Xe	(7−)	
^{120m}Cs	100(60)# keV			1977	57(6) s	β^{+}, α (<2×10^{−5}%)	^{116}Te	(7−)	
^{120m}Cs	100(60)# keV			1977	57(6) s	β^{+}, p (<7×10^{−6}%)	^{119}I	(7−)	
^{121}Cs	55	66	120.917227(15)	1969	155(4) s	β^{+}	^{121}Xe	3/2+	
^{121m}Cs	68.5(3) keV			1981	122(3) s	β^{+} (83%)	^{121}Xe	9/2+	
^{121m}Cs	68.5(3) keV			1981	122(3) s	IT (17%)	^{121}Cs	9/2+	
^{122}Cs	55	67	121.916108(36)	1969	21.18(19) s	β^{+}	^{122}Xe	1+	
^{122}Cs	55	67	121.916108(36)	1969	21.18(19) s	β^{+}, α (<2×10^{−7}%)	^{118}Te	1+	
^{122m1}Cs	45.87(12) keV			(1987) (Note: Only published in a conference proceeding and not a refereed journal)	>1 μs	IT	^{122}Cs	3+	
^{122m2}Cs	140(30) keV			1983	3.70(11) min	β^{+}	^{122}Xe	8−	
^{122m3}Cs	127.07(16) keV			1969	360(20) ms	IT	^{122}Cs	5−	
^{123}Cs	55	68	122.912996(13)	1954	5.88(3) min	β^{+}	^{123}Xe	1/2+	
^{123m1}Cs	156.27(5) keV			1972	1.64(12) s	IT	^{123}Cs	11/2−	
^{123m2}Cs	252(6) keV			2000	114(5) ns	IT	^{123}Cs	(9/2+)	
^{124}Cs	55	69	123.9122474(98)	1969	30.9(4) s	β^{+}	^{124}Xe	1+	
^{124m}Cs	462.63(14) keV			1983	6.41(7) s	IT (99.89%)	^{124}Cs	(7)+	
^{124m}Cs	462.63(14) keV			1983	6.41(7) s	β^{+} (0.11%)	^{124}Xe	(7)+	
^{125}Cs	55	70	124.9097260(83)	1954	44.35(29) min	β^{+}	^{125}Xe	1/2+	
^{125m}Cs	266.1(11) keV			1998	900(30) ms	IT	^{125}Cs	(11/2−)	
^{126}Cs	55	71	125.909446(11)	1954	1.64(2) min	β^{+}	^{126}Xe	1+	
^{126m1}Cs	273.0(7) keV			(1991)	~1 μs	IT	^{126}Cs	(4−)	
^{126m2}Cs	596.1(11) keV			2003	171(14) μs	IT	^{126}Cs	8−#	
^{127}Cs	55	72	126.9074175(60)	1950	6.25(10) h	β^{+}	^{127}Xe	1/2+	
^{127m}Cs	452.23(21) keV			1971	55(3) μs	IT	^{127}Cs	(11/2)−	
^{128}Cs	55	73	127.9077485(57)	1951	3.640(14) min	β^{+}	^{128}Xe	1+	
^{129}Cs	55	74	128.9060659(49)	1950	32.06(6) h	β^{+}	^{129}Xe	1/2+	
^{129m}Cs	575.40(14) keV			1977	718(21) ns	IT	^{129}Cs	(11/2−)	
^{130}Cs	55	75	129.9067093(90)	1952	29.21(4) min	β^{+} (98.4%)	^{130}Xe	1+	
^{130}Cs	55	75	129.9067093(90)	1952	29.21(4) min	β^{−} (1.6%)	^{130}Ba	1+	
^{130m}Cs	163.25(11) keV			1977	3.46(6) min	IT (99.84%)	^{130}Cs	5−	
^{130m}Cs	163.25(11) keV			1977	3.46(6) min	β^{+} (0.16%)	^{130}Xe	5−	
^{131}Cs	55	76	130.90546846(19)	1947	9.689(16) d	EC	^{131}Xe	5/2+	
^{132}Cs	55	77	131.9064378(11)	1953	6.480(6) d	β^{+} (98.13%)	^{132}Xe	2+	
^{132}Cs	55	77	131.9064378(11)	1953	6.480(6) d	β^{−} (1.87%)	^{132}Ba	2+	
^{133}Cs (Note: Used to define the second) (Note: Fission product)	55	78	132.905451958(8)	1921	Stable			7/2+	1.0000
^{134}Cs	55	79	133.906718501(17)	1940	2.0650(4) y	β^{−}	^{134}Ba	4+	
^{134}Cs	55	79	133.906718501(17)	1940	2.0650(4) y	EC (3.0×10^{−4}%)	^{134}Xe	4+	
^{134m}Cs	138.7441(26) keV			1940	2.912(2) h	IT	^{134}Cs	8−	
^{135}Cs (Note: Long-lived fission product)	55	80	134.90597691(39)	1949	1.33(19)×10^{6} y	β^{−}	^{135}Ba	7/2+	
^{135m}Cs	1632.9(15) keV			1962	53(2) min	IT	^{135}Cs	19/2−	
^{136}Cs	55	81	135.9073114(20)	1951	13.01(5) d	β^{−}	^{136}Ba	5+	
^{136m1}Cs	517.9(1) keV			1975	17.5(2) s	β^{−}?	^{136}Ba	8−	
^{136m1}Cs	517.9(1) keV			1975	17.5(2) s	IT?	^{136}Cs	8−	
^{136m2}Cs	73.7(1) keV			2023	109(3) ns	IT	^{136}Cs		
^{137}Cs	55	82	136.90708930(32)	1951	30.04(4) y	β^{−} (94.70%)	^{137m1}Ba	7/2+	
^{137}Cs	55	82	136.90708930(32)	1951	30.04(4) y	β^{−} (5.30%)	^{137}Ba	7/2+	
^{138}Cs	55	83	137.9110171(98)	1943	33.5(2) min	β^{−}	^{138}Ba	3−	
^{138m}Cs	79.9(3) keV			1971	2.91(10) min	IT (81%)	^{138}Cs	6−	
^{138m}Cs	79.9(3) keV			1971	2.91(10) min	β^{−} (19%)	^{138}Ba	6−	
^{139}Cs	55	84	138.9133638(34)	1939	9.27(5) min	β^{−}	^{139}Ba	7/2+	
^{140}Cs	55	85	139.9172837(88)	1950	63.7(3) s	β^{−}	^{140}Ba	1−	
^{140m}Cs	13.931(21) keV			1975	471(51) ns	IT	^{140}Cs	(2)−	
^{141}Cs	55	86	140.9200453(99)	1962	24.84(16) s	β^{−} (99.97%)	^{141}Ba	7/2+	
^{141}Cs	55	86	140.9200453(99)	1962	24.84(16) s	β^{−}, n (0.0342%)	^{140}Ba	7/2+	
^{142}Cs	55	87	141.9242995(76)	1962	1.687(10) s	β^{−} (99.91%)	^{142}Ba	0−	
^{142}Cs	55	87	141.9242995(76)	1962	1.687(10) s	β^{−}, n (0.089%)	^{141}Ba	0−	
^{143}Cs	55	88	142.9273473(81)	1962	1.802(8) s	β^{−} (98.38%)	^{143}Ba	3/2+	
^{143}Cs	55	88	142.9273473(81)	1962	1.802(8) s	β^{−}, n (1.62%)	^{142}Ba	3/2+	
^{144}Cs	55	89	143.932075(22)	1967	994(6) ms	β^{−} (97.02%)	^{144}Ba	1−	
^{144}Cs	55	89	143.932075(22)	1967	994(6) ms	β^{−}, n (2.98%)	^{143}Ba	1−	
^{144m}Cs	92.2(5) keV			2009	1.1(1) μs	IT	^{144}Cs	(4−)	
^{145}Cs	55	90	144.9355289(97)	1971	582(4) ms	β^{−} (87.2%)	^{145}Ba	3/2+	
^{145}Cs	55	90	144.9355289(97)	1971	582(4) ms	β^{−}, n (12.8%)	^{144}Ba	3/2+	
^{145m}Cs	762.9(4) keV			(2015)	0.5(1) μs	IT	^{145}Cs	13/2#	
^{146}Cs	55	91	145.9406219(31)	1971	321.6(9) ms	β^{−} (85.8%)	^{146}Ba	1−	
^{146}Cs	55	91	145.9406219(31)	1971	321.6(9) ms	β^{−}, n (14.2%)	^{145}Ba	1−	
^{146m}Cs	46.7(1) keV			(2015)	1.25(5) μs	IT	^{146}Cs	4−#	
^{147}Cs	55	92	146.9442615(90)	1978	230.5(9) ms	β^{−} (71.5%)	^{147}Ba	(3/2+)	
^{147}Cs	55	92	146.9442615(90)	1978	230.5(9) ms	β^{−}, n (28.5%)	^{146}Ba	(3/2+)	
^{147m}Cs	701.4(4) keV			(2015)	190(20) ns	IT	^{147}Cs	13/2#	
^{148}Cs	55	93	147.949639(14)	1978	151.8(10) ms	β^{−} (71.3%)	^{148}Ba	(2−)	
^{148}Cs	55	93	147.949639(14)	1978	151.8(10) ms	β^{−}, n (28.7%)	^{147}Ba	(2−)	
^{148m}Cs	45.2(1) keV			(2015)	4.8(2) μs	IT	^{148}Cs	4−#	
^{149}Cs	55	94	148.95352(43)#	2017	112.3(25) ms	β^{−} (75%)	^{149}Ba	3/2+#	
^{149}Cs	55	94	148.95352(43)#	2017	112.3(25) ms	β^{−}, n (25%)	^{148}Ba	3/2+#	
^{150}Cs	55	95	149.95902(43)#	2017	81.0(26) ms	β^{−} (~56%)	^{150}Ba	(2−)	
^{150}Cs	55	95	149.95902(43)#	2017	81.0(26) ms	β^{−}, n (~44%)	^{149}Ba	(2−)	
^{151}Cs	55	96	150.96320(54)#	2017	59(19) ms	β^{−}	^{151}Ba	3/2+#	
^{152}Cs	55	97	151.96873(54)#	2026	17# ms				
This table header & footer:

== Caesium-131 ==
Caesium-131 decays purely by electron capture to the ground state of stable xenon-131 with a half-life of 9.69 days; its detectable radiation is the X-rays of xenon, with a maximum energy of 34.5 keV. It was introduced in 2004 for brachytherapy by Isoray.

== Caesium-133 ==
Caesium-133 is the only stable isotope of caesium. The SI base unit of time, the second, is defined by a specific caesium-133 transition. Since 1967, the official definition of a second is:

The second, symbol s, is defined by taking the fixed numerical value of the caesium frequency, Δν_{Cs}, the unperturbed ground-state hyperfine transition frequency of the caesium-133 atom, to be 9192631770 Hz, which is equal to s^{−1}.

== Caesium-134 ==
Caesium-134 has a half-life of 2.0650 years. It is produced both directly (at a very small yield because ^{134}Xe is stable) as a fission product and via neutron capture from nonradioactive ^{133}Cs (neutron capture cross section 29 barns), which is a common fission product. It is not produced by nuclear weapons because ^{133}Cs is created by beta decay of original fission products long after the nuclear explosion is over.

The combined yield of ^{133}Cs and ^{134}Cs is given as 6.7896%. The proportion between the two will change with continued neutron irradiation. ^{134}Cs also captures neutrons with a cross section of 140 barns, becoming long-lived radioactive ^{135}Cs.

Caesium-134 undergoes beta decay (β^{−}), producing stable ^{134}Ba after emitting on average 2.23 gamma ray photons (mean energy 0.698 MeV).

== Caesium-135 ==
Long-lived fission products
Nuclide	t_{1/2}	Yield	Q (Note: Decay energy is split among β, neutrino, and γ if any.)	βγ
	(Ma)	(%) (Note: Per 65 thermal neutron fissions of ^{235}U and 35 of ^{239}Pu.)	(keV)	
^{99}Tc	0.211	6.1385	294	β
^{126}Sn	0.23	0.1084	4050 (Note: Has decay energy 380 keV, but its decay product ^{126}Sb has decay energy 3.67 MeV.)	βγ
^{79}Se	0.33	0.0447	151	β
^{135}Cs	1.33	6.9110 (Note: Lower in thermal reactors because ^{135}Xe, its predecessor, readily absorbs neutrons.)	269	β
^{93}Zr	1.61	5.4575	91	βγ
^{107}Pd	6.5	1.2499	33	β
^{129}I	16.1	0.8410	194	βγ

Caesium-135 is a mildly radioactive isotope of caesium with a half-life of 1.33 million years. It decays via emission of a low-energy beta particle into the stable isotope barium-135. Caesium-135 is one of the seven long-lived fission products and the only alkaline one. In most types of nuclear reprocessing, it stays with the medium-lived fission products (including ^{137}Cs which can only be separated from ^{135}Cs via isotope separation) rather than with other long-lived fission products. As an exception, molten salt reactors create ^{135}Cs as a completely separate stream outside the fuel (after the decay of bubble-separated ^{135}Xe). The low decay energy, lack of gamma radiation, and long half-life of ^{135}Cs make this isotope much less hazardous than ^{137}Cs or ^{134}Cs.

Its precursor ^{135}Xe has a high fission product yield (e.g., 6.3333% for ^{235}U and thermal neutrons) but also has the highest known thermal neutron capture cross section of any nuclide. Because of this, much of the ^{135}Xe produced in current thermal reactors (as much as >90% at steady-state full power) will be converted to practically stable ^{136}Xe before it can decay to ^{135}Cs despite the relatively short half-life of ^{135}Xe. Little or no ^{135}Xe will be destroyed by neutron capture after a reactor shutdown, or in a molten salt reactor that continuously removes xenon from its fuel, a fast neutron reactor, or a nuclear weapon. The xenon pit is a phenomenon of excess neutron absorption through ^{135}Xe buildup in the reactor after a reduction in power or a shutdown and is often managed by letting the ^{135}Xe decay away to a level at which neutron flux can be safely controlled via control rods again.

A nuclear reactor will also produce much smaller amounts of ^{135}Cs from the nonradioactive fission product ^{133}Cs by successive neutron capture to ^{134}Cs and then ^{135}Cs.

The thermal neutron capture cross section and resonance integral of ^{135}Cs are 8.3 ± 0.3 and 38.1 ± 2.6 barns respectively. Disposal of ^{135}Cs by nuclear transmutation is difficult, because of the low cross section as well as because neutron irradiation of mixed-isotope fission caesium produces more ^{135}Cs from stable ^{133}Cs. In addition, the intense medium-term radioactivity of ^{137}Cs makes handling of nuclear waste difficult.

- ANL factsheet

== Caesium-136 ==
Caesium-136 has a half-life of 13.01 days. It is produced both directly (at a very small yield because ^{136}Xe is beta-stable) as a fission product and via neutron capture from long-lived ^{135}Cs, though because of the lower cross-section (see above) and sort half-life, is much less abundant in spent fuel and vanishes quickly. It is also not produced by nuclear weapons because ^{135}Cs is created by beta decay of original fission products only long after the nuclear explosion is over. Caesium-136 undergoes beta decay (β^{−}) to ^{136}Ba.

== Caesium-137 ==
Caesium-137, with a half-life of 30.04 years, is one of the two principal medium-lived fission products, along with ^{90}Sr, which are responsible for most of the radioactivity of spent nuclear fuel from several years up to several hundred years after use. It constitutes most of the radioactivity still left from the Chernobyl accident and is a major health concern for decontaminating land near the Fukushima nuclear power plant. ^{137}Cs beta decays to barium-137m (a short-lived nuclear isomer), which in de-excitation to its stable ground state barium-137, usually emits a gamma ray. This process is responsible for all the gamma emission from caesium-137.

^{137}Cs has a very low rate of neutron capture and cannot yet be feasibly disposed of in this way unless advances in neutron beam collimation (not otherwise achievable by magnetic fields), uniquely available only from within muon catalyzed fusion experiments (not in the other forms of Accelerator Transmutation of Nuclear Waste) enables production of neutrons at high enough intensity to offset and overcome these low capture rates; until then, therefore, ^{137}Cs must simply be allowed to decay.

^{137}Cs has been used as a tracer in hydrologic studies, analogous to the use of ^{3}H.

== Fission-produced isotopes of caesium ==
The heavier isotopes have half-lives of seconds or minutes. Almost all caesium produced from nuclear fission comes from beta decay of originally more neutron-rich fission products, passing through isotopes of iodine then isotopes of xenon. Because these elements are volatile and can diffuse through nuclear fuel or air, caesium (thus its higher-Z decay products) is often created far from the original site of fission.

== See also ==
Daughter products other than caesium

- Isotopes of barium
- Isotopes of xenon
- Isotopes of iodine
- Isotopes of tellurium
