= Isotopes of niobium =

Isotopes of niobium (_{41}Nb)
Main isotopes			Decay	
Isotope	abundance	half-life (t_{1/2})	mode	product
^{91}Nb	synth	680 y	β^{+}	^{91}Zr
^{91m}Nb	synth	60.86 d	IT	^{91}Nb
^{91m}Nb	synth	60.86 d	β^{+}	^{91}Zr
^{92}Nb	trace	3.47×10^{7} y	β^{+}	^{92}Zr
^{93}Nb	100%	stable		
^{93m}Nb	synth	16.1 y	IT	^{93}Nb
^{94}Nb	trace	2.04×10^{4} y	β^{−}	^{94}Mo
^{95}Nb	synth	34.991 d	β^{−}	^{95}Mo

Standard atomic weight A_{r}°(Nb)
- 92.90637±0.00001; 92.906±0.001 (abridged)

Naturally occurring niobium (_{41}Nb) is composed of one stable isotope (^{93}Nb). The most stable radioisotope is ^{92}Nb with a half-life of 34.7 million years, followed by ^{94}Nb at a half-life of 20,400 years and ^{91}Nb at 680 years. Other radioisotopes that have been synthesized range from ^{82}Nb to ^{110}Nb; these have half-lives that are less than two hours, except ^{95}Nb (34.991 days), ^{96}Nb (23.35 hours) and ^{90}Nb (14.60 hours).

The most stable of the meta states is ^{93m}Nb with excitation energy 31 keV and a 16.1 year half-life; this is produced in the decay of ^{93}Zr. The primary decay mode before stable ^{93}Nb is electron capture to zirconium isotopes and the primary mode after is beta emission, with delayed neutron emission starting at ^{104}Nb, leading to molybdenum isotopes.

Only ^{95}Nb, along with ^{97}Nb (72 minutes) and heavier isotopes (seconds) are fission products in significant quantity, as the other isotopes are shadowed by stable or very long-lived (93) isotopes of the preceding element zirconium from the usual mode of production through beta decay of neutron-rich fission fragments. ^{95}Nb is the decay product of ^{95}Zr (64 days), so disappearance of ^{95}Nb in used nuclear fuel is slower than would be expected from its own 35-day half-life alone.

== List of isotopes ==
Nuclide (Note: ^{m}Nb – Excited nuclear isomer.)	Z	N	Isotopic mass (Da) (Note: ( ) – Uncertainty (1σ) is given in concise form in parentheses after the corresponding last digits.) (Note: # – Atomic mass marked #: value and uncertainty derived not from purely experimental data, but at least partly from trends from the Mass Surface (TMS).)	Discovery year	Half-life (Note: # – Values marked # are not purely derived from experimental data, but at least partly from trends of neighboring nuclides (TNN).)	Decay mode (Note: Modes of decay: EC: / Electron capture; IT: / Isomeric transition; n: / Neutron emission; p: / Proton emission)	Daughter isotope (Note: Bold italics symbol as daughter – Daughter product is nearly stable.) (Note: Bold symbol as daughter – Daughter product is stable.)	Spin and parity (Note: ( ) spin value – Indicates spin with weak assignment arguments.)	Isotopic abundance
Nuclide	Excitation energy			Discovery year	Half-life	Decay mode	Daughter isotope	Spin and parity	Isotopic abundance
^{82}Nb	41	41	81.94438(32)	1992	51(5) ms	β^{+}	^{82}Zr	(0+)	
^{82m}Nb	1180(1) keV			2008	93(20) ns	IT	^{82}Nb	(5+)	
^{83}Nb	41	42	82.938133(10)	1988	3.9(2) s	β^{+}	^{83}Zr	9/2+#	
^{84}Nb	41	43	83.93430571(43)	1977	9.8(9) s	β^{+}	^{84}Zr	(1+)	
^{84m1}Nb	48(1) keV			2009	176(46) ns	IT	^{84}Nb	(3+)	
^{84m2}Nb	337.7(4) keV			(2000) (Note: Half-life shorter than 100 ns, not included in the discovery database)	92(5) ns	IT	^{84}Nb	(5−)	
^{85}Nb	41	44	84.9288458(44)	1988	20.5(7) s	β^{+}	^{85}Zr	9/2+#	
^{85m}Nb	150(80)# keV			2005	3.3(9) s	IT (?%)	^{85}Nb	(1/2−)	
^{85m}Nb	150(80)# keV			2005	3.3(9) s	β^{+} (?%)	^{85}Zr	(1/2−)	
^{86}Nb	41	45	85.9257815(59)	1974	88(1) s	β^{+}	^{86}Zr	(6+)	
^{86m}Nb (Note: Order of ground state and isomer is uncertain.)	150(100)# keV			(1994) (Note: Only assumed, no property measured)	20# s	β^{+}	^{86}Zr	(0−,1−,2−)	
^{87}Nb	41	46	86.9206925(73)	1971	3.7(1) min	β^{+}	^{87}Zr	(1/2)−	
^{87m}Nb	3.9(1) keV			1972	2.6(1) min	β^{+}	^{87}Zr	(9/2)+	
^{88}Nb	41	47	87.918226(62)	1964	14.50(11) min	β^{+}	^{88}Zr	(8+)	
^{88m}Nb	130(120) keV			1971	7.7(1) min	β^{+}	^{88}Zr	(4−)	
^{89}Nb	41	48	88.913445(25)	1954	2.03(7) h	β^{+}	^{89}Zr	(9/2+)	
^{89m}Nb	0(30)# keV			1954	1.10(3) h	β^{+}	^{89}Zr	(1/2)−	
^{90}Nb	41	49	89.9112592(36)	1951	14.60(5) h	β^{+}	^{90}Zr	8+	
^{90m1}Nb	122.370(22) keV			1967	63(2) μs	IT	^{90}Nb	6+	
^{90m2}Nb	124.67(25) keV			1955	18.81(6) s	IT	^{90}Nb	4-	
^{90m3}Nb	171.10(10) keV			(1981) (Note: Half-life not measured, state only assumed)	<1 μs	IT	^{90}Nb	7+	
^{90m4}Nb	382.01(25) keV			1955	6.19(8) ms	IT	^{90m1}Nb	1+	
^{90m5}Nb	1880.21(20) keV			1981	471(6) ns	IT	^{90}Nb	(11−)	
^{91}Nb	41	50	90.9069903(31)	1951	680(130) y	EC (99.99%)	^{91}Zr	9/2+	
^{91}Nb	41	50	90.9069903(31)	1951	680(130) y	β^{+} (0.0138%)	^{91}Zr	9/2+	
^{91m1}Nb	104.60(5) keV			1965	60.86(22) d	IT (96.6%)	^{91}Nb	1/2−	
^{91m1}Nb	104.60(5) keV			1965	60.86(22) d	EC (3.4%)	^{91}Zr	1/2−	
^{91m1}Nb	104.60(5) keV			1965	60.86(22) d	β^{+} (0.0028%)	^{91}Zr	1/2−	
^{91m2}Nb	2034.42(20) keV			1974	3.76(12) μs	IT	^{91}Nb	(17/2−)	
^{92}Nb	41	51	91.9071886(19)	1938	3.47(24)×10^{7} y	β^{+}	^{92}Zr	7+	Trace
^{92m1}Nb	135.5(4) keV			1959	10.116(13) d	β^{+}	^{92}Zr	(2)+	
^{92m2}Nb	225.8(4) keV			1958	5.9(2) μs	IT	^{92}Nb	(2)−	
^{92m3}Nb	2203.3(4) keV			1977	167(4) ns	IT	^{92}Nb	(11−)	
^{93}Nb	41	52	92.9063732(16)	1932	Stable			9/2+	1.0000
^{93m1}Nb	30.760(5) keV			1965	16.12(12) y	IT	^{93}Nb	1/2−	
^{93m2}Nb	7460(17) keV			2007	1.5(5) μs	IT	^{93}Nb	33/2−#	
^{94}Nb	41	53	93.9072790(16)	1938	2.04(4)×10^{4} y	β^{−}	^{94}Mo	6+	Trace
^{94m}Nb	40.892(12) keV			1950	6.263(4) min	IT (99.50%)	^{94}Nb	3+	
^{94m}Nb	40.892(12) keV			1950	6.263(4) min	β^{−} (0.50%)	^{94}Mo	3+	
^{95}Nb (Note: Fission product)	41	54	94.90683111(55)	1946	34.991(6) d	β^{−}	^{95}Mo	9/2+	
^{95m}Nb	235.69(2) keV			1951	3.61(3) d	IT (94.4%)	^{95}Nb	1/2−	
^{95m}Nb	235.69(2) keV			1951	3.61(3) d	β^{−} (5.6%)	^{95}Mo	1/2−	
^{96}Nb	41	55	95.90810159(16)	1949	23.35(5) h	β^{−}	^{96}Mo	6+	Trace (Note: Intermediate decay product of ^{96}Zr)
^{97}Nb	41	56	96.9081016(46)	1951	72.1(7) min	β^{−}	^{97}Mo	9/2+	
^{97m}Nb	743.35(3) keV			1950	58.7(18) s	IT	^{97}Nb	1/2−	
^{98}Nb	41	57	97.9103326(54)	1960	2.86(6) s	β^{−}	^{98}Mo	1+	
^{98m}Nb	84(4) keV			1967	51.1(4) min	β^{−}	^{98}Mo	(5)+	
^{99}Nb	41	58	98.911609(13)	1950	15.0(2) s	β^{−}	^{99}Mo	9/2+	
^{99m}Nb	365.27(8) keV			1963	2.5(2) min	β^{−} (?%)	^{99}Mo	1/2−	
^{99m}Nb	365.27(8) keV			1963	2.5(2) min	IT (?%)	^{99}Nb	1/2−	
^{100}Nb	41	59	99.9143406(86)	1967	1.5(2) s	β^{−}	^{100}Mo	1+	
^{100m1}Nb	313(8) keV			1976	2.99(11) s	β^{−}	^{100}Mo	(5+)	
^{100m2}Nb	347(8) keV			1970	460(60) ns	IT	^{100}Nb	(4−,5−)	
^{100m3}Nb	734(8) keV			1999	12.43(26) μs	IT	^{100}Nb	(8−)	
^{101}Nb	41	60	100.9153065(40)	1970	7.1(3) s	β^{−}	^{101}Mo	5/2+	
^{102}Nb	41	61	101.9180904(27)	1972	4.3(4) s	β^{−}	^{102}Mo	(4+)	
^{102m}Nb	94(7) keV			1976	1.31(16) s	β^{−}	^{102}Mo	(1+)	
^{103}Nb	41	62	102.9194534(42)	1971	1.34(7) s	β^{−}	^{103}Mo	5/2+	
^{104}Nb	41	63	103.9229077(19)	1971	0.98(5) s	β^{−} (99.95%)	^{104}Mo	(1+)	
^{104}Nb	41	63	103.9229077(19)	1971	0.98(5) s	β^{−}, n (0.05%)	^{103}Mo	(1+)	
^{104m}Nb	9.8(26) keV			1976	4.9(3) s	β^{−} (99.94%)	^{104}Mo	(0−,1−)	
^{104m}Nb	9.8(26) keV			1976	4.9(3) s	β^{−}, n (0.06%)	^{103}Mo	(0−,1−)	
^{105}Nb	41	64	104.9249426(43)	1984	2.91(5) s	β^{−} (98.3%)	^{105}Mo	(5/2+)	
^{105}Nb	41	64	104.9249426(43)	1984	2.91(5) s	β^{−}, n (1.7%)	^{104}Mo	(5/2+)	
^{106}Nb	41	65	105.9289285(15)	1976	900(20) ms	β^{−} (95.5%)	^{106}Mo	1−#	
^{106}Nb	41	65	105.9289285(15)	1976	900(20) ms	β^{−}, n (4.5%)	^{105}Mo	1−#	
^{106m1}Nb	100(50)# keV			(2020) (Note: Not separately measured from the ground state, the isomeric is assumed to be different)	1.20(6) s	β^{−}	^{106}Mo	(4−)	
^{106m2}Nb	204.8(5) keV			1999	820(38) ns	IT	^{106}Nb	(3+)	
^{107}Nb	41	66	106.9315897(86)	1992	286(8) ms	β^{−} (92.6%)	^{107}Mo	(5/2+)	
^{107}Nb	41	66	106.9315897(86)	1992	286(8) ms	β^{−}, n (7.4%)	^{106}Mo	(5/2+)	
^{108}Nb	41	67	107.9360756(88)	1994	201(4) ms	β^{−} (93.7%)	^{108}Mo	(2+)	
^{108}Nb	41	67	107.9360756(88)	1994	201(4) ms	β^{−}, n (6.3%)	^{107}Mo	(2+)	
^{108m}Nb	166.6(5) keV			2012	109(2) ns	IT	^{108}Nb	6−#	
^{109}Nb	41	68	108.93914(46)	1994	106.9(49) ms	β^{−} (69%)	^{109}Mo	3/2−#	
^{109}Nb	41	68	108.93914(46)	1994	106.9(49) ms	β^{−}, n (31%)	^{108}Mo	3/2−#	
^{109m}Nb	312.5(4) keV			2011	115(8) ns	IT	^{109}Nb	7/2+#	
^{110}Nb	41	69	109.94384(90)	1994	75(1) ms	β^{−} (60%)	^{110}Mo	5+#	
^{110}Nb	41	69	109.94384(90)	1994	75(1) ms	β^{−}, n (40%)	^{109}Mo	5+#	
^{110m}Nb	100(50)# keV			2020	94(9) ms	β^{−} (60%)	^{110}Mo	2+#	
^{110m}Nb	100(50)# keV			2020	94(9) ms	β^{−}, n (40%)	^{109}Mo	2+#	
^{111}Nb	41	70	110.94744(32)#	1997	54(2) ms	β^{−}	^{111}Mo	3/2−#	
^{112}Nb	41	71	111.95269(32)#	1997	38(2) ms	β^{−}	^{112}Mo	1+#	
^{113}Nb	41	72	112.95683(43)#	1997	32(4) ms	β^{−}	^{113}Mo	3/2−#	
^{113m}Nb	135 keV			2022	700(400) ns	IT	^{113}Nb		
^{114}Nb	41	73	113.96247(54)#	2010	17(5) ms	β^{−}	^{114}Mo	2−#	
^{115}Nb	41	74	114.96685(54)#	2010	23(8) ms	β^{−}	^{115}Mo	3/2−#	
^{116}Nb	41	75	115.97291(32)#	2018	12# ms [>550 ns]			1−#	
^{117}Nb	41	76		2021					
This table header & footer:

== Niobium-92 ==
Niobium-92 is an extinct radionuclide with a half-life of 34.7 million years, decaying predominantly via β^{+} decay. Its abundance relative to the stable ^{93}Nb in the early Solar System, estimated at 1.7×10^{−5}, has been measured to investigate the origin of p-nuclei. A higher initial abundance of ^{92}Nb has been estimated for material in the outer protosolar disk (sampled from the meteorite NWA 6704), suggesting that this nuclide was predominantly formed via the gamma process (photodisintegration) in a nearby core-collapse supernova.

Niobium-92, along with niobium-94, has been detected in refined samples of terrestrial niobium and may originate from bombardment by cosmic ray muons in Earth's crust.

== See also ==
Daughter products other than niobium

- Isotopes of molybdenum
- Isotopes of zirconium
