= Marshall Brucer =

American medical researcher

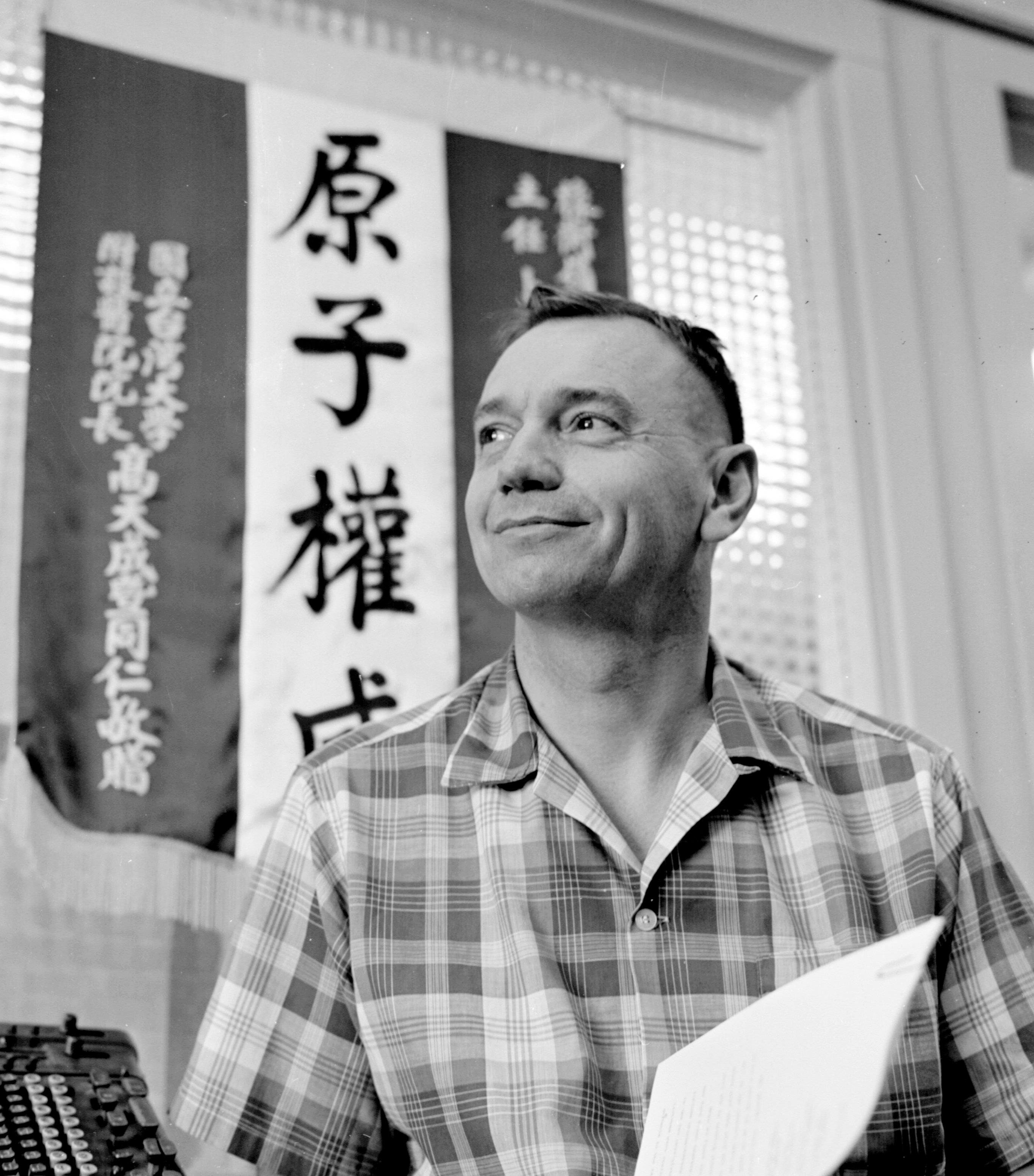
portrait of Dr. Marshall Brucer

Dr Marshall Brucer (1913–1994) was an American medical researcher from Chicago, Illinois. He was appointed Chairman of the Medical Division of Oak Ridge Institute of Nuclear Studies in 1949, where he researched the applications of radiation in the treatment of cancer and other malignant diseases. He retired as Division chairman in 1962. A compendium of his writing entitled "A Chronology of Nuclear Medicine" was published by Robert R. Butaine in September 1990.

== Career ==
Brucer was educated at Northwestern University and the University of Chicago. He graduated with a Bachelor of Science and a Doctor of Medicine. He was an intern at Mallory Institute of Pathology in Boston. During the late 1930s he studied human physiological responses to the increasing pace and changing nature of modern life, including blood pressure and heart conditions. He also identified correlations between body shape and blood pressure.

Brucer joined the United States Army in 1942, and was released in 1946 as a lieutenant colonel. He served as surgeon of the Airborne Command at Camp Mackall, North Carolina.

He then joined the University of Texas' Medical School staff. In 1949, Brucer became the Chairman of the Medical Division of the Oak Ridge Institute of Nuclear Studies, where he researched the application of radiation in the treatment of cancers and other malignant diseases.

In 1951, Brucer directed tests of the use of radioactive cobalt in prospective radiotherapy. The instruments used were manufactured by General Electric.

In 1952, Brucer was supervising a hospital staff of 60 people, including doctors, physicists, radiologists, nurses and others. The hospital was sponsored by 29 southern American universities. Patients volunteered to receive experimental therapies at the hospital. They were given atomic "cocktails" to drink and injections of radio-isotopes, and became temporarily radioactive. While not guaranteed that the treatments would be successful, patients were assured that none of the new medicines would cause harm.

Brucer was also involved in discussions regarding the establishment of a nuclear reactor at the University of Houston for the production of radio-isotopes in 1952.

In 1953, Brucer gave testimony to a House Commerce Committee on the medical applications of nuclear energy. The Committee hoped to establish what the Atomic Energy Commission was achieving in the field of nuclear medicine.

In 1954, a new radiotherapy device using cesium as the gamma radiation source was scheduled to be tested in Rockford, Illinois. Brucer was a spokesperson for the project, which was funded by the Atomic Energy Commission. The machine was to be tested on animal subjects prior to its application to human cancer patients. The device benefited from military research in computer control, and was pioneering in its degree of automation.

In 1955, Brucer dedicated a new cobalt-based radiotherapy machine at the Cedars of Lebanon Hospital in Los Angeles, California. The dedication was made with Senator J. William Fulbright and industrialist Paul G. Hoffman. Another was dedicated a City of Hope Medical Center, Duarte. Brucer invented an "iron maiden" containing radioactive sand which was tested for the treatment of breast cancer. That year he also announced the intention to produce cesium-137 for radiotherapy by 1957. Brucer told a conference that the use of radio-isotopes of iodine, gold and phosphorus was becoming increasingly commonplace. He said that shipments of radioactive drugs from Oak Ridge numbered 50,000 units of radio-iodine, 50,000 units of radio-gold and 13,000 units of radio-phosphorus each month.

In 1956, Brucer said of progress in his field:

Isotopes remain potentially wonderful but the challenge now is how to handle them right, how to watch our step. Their role in physics and chemistry is highly technical, yet can be accurately measured. Our toughest obstacle in their correct use is human biology. Their effects differ person to person and sometimes even hourly in the same person. Against cancer we have the same problem with isotopes as with the x-ray and radium- minimizing the damage to good cells while killing the wild cells.

In 1957, Brucer was elected president of the Society of Nuclear Medicine. In 1958, Brucer tested experimental treatments for leukemia, involving the application of full body radiation and bone marrow transplants. Brucer said of the work:

The amount of radiation between wiping out the bone marrow and the amount needed to kill a patient is a very fine line... it is not yet good therapy, but most [of the patients at Oak Ridge] are terminal cases anyhow and maybe it is justifiable to deprive some of a few months of life to give life to those that are not killed.

In 1959, Brucer collaborated with Dr Melvin L. Jacobs and physicist Leon Pape on the establishment of a new facility at the City of Hope Medical Center for research into full body radiation.

Brucer was also involved in the promotion of research grants and gave occasional presentations and radio broadcasts on nuclear medicine in the 1950s around the United States.

In 1961, Brucer presented a research paper to the Journal of the American Medical Association which suggested that the question of whether all radiation exposure was harmful was still open. He also argued for the relaxation of permissible dosage limits, telling a group of doctors at St. Paul's Hospital that he daily took four times the maximum accepted dosage of exposure to cobalt-58. He added that he "would very happily take up to one hundred times the maximum permissible dose" and referred to the maximum permissible dose at the time as "ridiculous". In 1960 the maximum permissible dose for radiation workers was set at 12 rads per year.

In 1961, Brucer gave a presentation at the Armed Forces Nuclear Medicine Symposium at Sandia Base. His presentation was on the topic of treatment of acute radiation damage.

He retired as division chairman in 1962, and later moved to Tucson, Arizona.

In 1965, Brucer was awarded the Atomic Energy Commission's citation for outstanding service. By this time he had published over 200 scientific papers and four books, and was acting as an editor of the International Journal of Applied Radiation and Radioisotopes.

In 1967, Brucer was appointed to the medical advisory committee of the Arizona Atomic Energy Commission.

In the 1970s, the University of Arizona presented the Marshall Brucer Award for distinguished effort in radiation.

=== Commentary on nuclear weapons test fallout and nuclear hazards ===
In 1958, Brucer participated in scientific discussions of the hazards of nuclear fallout. He said of his own medical research work that he "had not seen any somatic (bodily) damage" during his application of radiotherapy. He stated that damage had only been observed when radiation was applied for the purpose of deliberately damaging tissue. He then wrote an opinion editorial later that year that stated that "fallout radiation from atom bomb testing is of the same order of magnitude as natural radiation. It is a tiny addition to our natural environment." In the same piece he argued that it was far easier to kill someone with an automobile than with radiation and made reassuring statements about the relative safety of American nuclear facilities. The piece was written in response to questions posed by the public following the irradiation of eight people at the Oak Ridge National Laboratory in an accident there. His article was printed in various newspapers in 1958 and 1959.

In 1959, Brucer went on to speak of nuclear weapon test fallout, predicting that public anxiety on the subject would peak in 1961 or 1962. He told a group of doctors that there was "already some evidence that this manufactured public hysteria is shifting from the scare headline 'fallout' to an equally large scare headline 'waste disposal'."

He continued to present and speak on these topics in 1960. In 1961 he reinforced his view that exposure to nuclear weapons testing fall out was "no cause for panic." He also stated that the ability to measure radioactive fallout was a recent development, but simply being able to measure it didn't mean that it was significant. He also stated that the genetic effects of exposure to fallout on humans was unknown. He stated that "there is no proof that any distant fallout has ever caused any effect on any person."

In 1961, Brucer suggested that the basement of a domestic residence would be sufficient protection from distant fallout, and raised concern regarding the impact of an accidental detonation of a nuclear weapon from the American inventory. In 1962, Brucer described a means of testing for radiation exposure by combing one's hair with a rubber comb and testing the resultant static electricity's ability to pick up a small piece of paper.

Following his retirement in 1962, the American Medical Association continued to repeat Brucer's warning that "over-emphasis on radiation hazard could easily cause us to curtail the use of roentgen rays in medicine, in which case medicine as we now know it would disappear. It might cause us to curtain the use of roentgen rays in dentistry. It could cause us to stop radiation therapy and diagnosis with radioactive isotopes... the neglect of these things would be even more dangerous than under-emphasis of radiation safety."
