= Édouard Pecher =

Belgian lawyer and politician

- Born: Edouard Gustave Charles Marie Pecher; 24 November 1885; Antwerp, Belgium
- Died: 27 December 1926 (aged 41); Brussels, Belgium
- Occupations: politician, lawyer

Édouard Gustave Charles Marie Pecher (24 November 1885 – 27 December 1926) was a Belgian lawyer and liberal politician. He was president of the Liberal Party from 1921 until 1926.

Pecher was a doctor in law and became a member of parliament (1912–1919 and 1921–1926) for the district Antwerp. He was briefly Minister of the Colonies (1926) and died in office. From 1924 up to 1926, he was President of the Liberal Party.

His son was Charles Pecher.
