= IsoRay =

America medical company

Isoray Inc.
- Company type: Public
- Traded as: AMEX: ISR
- Industry: healthcare
- Founded: 2004
- Headquarters: Richland, Washington
- Website: http://www.isoray.com

Isoray Inc. (Isoray) is a national isotope-based medical company and the sole producer of Cesium brachytherapy sources, which are expanding brachytherapy treatments for difficult to treat cancers. Isoray is a registered manufacturer with the FDA and holds multiple 510(k) clearances for brachytherapy devices. The brachytherapy isotopes are sold under the brandname Blu.

The company went public in 2005. Isoray’s corporate headquarters is located at 350 Hills Street, Suite 106, Richland WA 99354.
