= Isotopes of yttrium =

Isotopes of yttrium (_{39}Y)
Main isotopes			Decay	
Isotope	abundance	half-life (t_{1/2})	mode	product
^{87}Y	synth	79.8 h	ε	^{87}Sr
^{88}Y	synth	106.63 d	ε	^{88}Sr
^{89}Y	100%	stable		
^{90}Y	synth	64.05 h	β^{−}	^{90}Zr
^{91}Y	synth	58.51 d	β^{−}	^{91}Zr

Standard atomic weight A_{r}°(Y)
- 88.905838±0.000002; 88.906±0.001 (abridged)

Natural yttrium (_{39}Y) is composed of the single stable isotope, ^{89}Y. The most stable radioisotopes are ^{88}Y, which has a half-life of 106.63 days, and ^{91}Y, with a half-life of 58.51 days. All the other isotopes and isomers have half-lives of less than 15 hours, except ^{87}Y with 79.8 hours and ^{90}Y with 64.05 hours. The dominant decay mode below the stable ^{89}Y is electron capture to isotopes of strontium and the dominant mode after it is beta emission to isotopes of zirconium.

In total, the isotopes characterized range from ^{76}Y to ^{109}Y.

In products of nuclear fission, ^{90}Y exists in equilibrium with its parent isotope strontium-90. This isotope alone is also used in medicine; see yttrium-90.

== List of isotopes ==
Nuclide (Note: ^{m}Y – Excited nuclear isomer.)	Z	N	Isotopic mass (Da) (Note: ( ) – Uncertainty (1σ) is given in concise form in parentheses after the corresponding last digits.) (Note: # – Atomic mass marked #: value and uncertainty derived not from purely experimental data, but at least partly from trends from the Mass Surface (TMS).)	Discovery year	Half-life (Note: # – Values marked # are not purely derived from experimental data, but at least partly from trends of neighboring nuclides (TNN).)	Decay mode (Note: Modes of decay: IT: / Isomeric transition; n: / Neutron emission; p: / Proton emission)	Daughter isotope (Note: Bold italics symbol as daughter – Daughter product is nearly stable.) (Note: Bold symbol as daughter – Daughter product is stable.)	Spin and parity (Note: ( ) spin value – Indicates spin with weak assignment arguments.)	Isotopic abundance
Nuclide	Excitation energy			Discovery year	Half-life	Decay mode	Daughter isotope	Spin and parity	Isotopic abundance
^{76}Y	39	37	75.95894(32)#	2001	28(9) ms	β^{+}?	^{76}Sr	1−#	
^{76}Y	39	37	75.95894(32)#	2001	28(9) ms	p?	^{75}Sr	1−#	
^{76}Y	39	37	75.95894(32)#	2001	28(9) ms	β^{+}, p?	^{75}Rb	1−#	
^{77}Y	39	38	76.95015(22)#	1999	63(17) ms	β^{+}	^{77}Sr	5/2+#	
^{77}Y	39	38	76.95015(22)#	1999	63(17) ms	p?	^{76}Sr	5/2+#	
^{77}Y	39	38	76.95015(22)#	1999	63(17) ms	β^{+}, p?	^{76}Rb	5/2+#	
^{78}Y	39	39	77.94399(32)#	1992	54(5) ms	β^{+}	^{78}Sr	(0+)	
^{78}Y	39	39	77.94399(32)#	1992	54(5) ms	β^{+}, p?	^{77}Rb	(0+)	
^{78m}Y (Note: Order of ground state and isomer is uncertain.)	~300 keV (Note: Measured mass is 77.944220(16) Da.)			1998	5.8(6) s	β^{+}	^{78}Sr	(5+)	
^{78m}Y	~300 keV			1998	5.8(6) s	β^{+}, p?	^{77}Rb	(5+)	
^{79}Y	39	40	78.937752(14)	1992	14.8(6) s	β^{+}	^{79}Sr	5/2+#	
^{80}Y	39	41	79.9343548(67)	1981	30.1(5) s	β^{+}	^{80}Sr	4−	
^{80m1}Y	228.5(1) keV			1998	4.8(3) s	IT (81%)	^{80}Y	1−	
^{80m1}Y	228.5(1) keV			1998	4.8(3) s	β^{+} (19%)	^{80}Sr	1−	
^{80m2}Y	312.6(9) keV			1997	4.7(3) μs	IT	^{80}Y	(2+)	
^{81}Y	39	42	80.9294459(30)	1981	70.4(10) s	β^{+}	^{81}Sr	(5/2+)	
^{82}Y	39	43	81.9269302(59)	1980	8.30(20) s	β^{+}	^{82}Sr	1+	
^{82m1}Y	402.63(14) keV			1993	258(22) ns	IT	^{82}Y	4−	
^{82m2}Y	507.50(13) keV			1993	148(6) ns	IT	^{82}Y	6+	
^{83}Y	39	44	82.922484(20)	1962	7.08(8) min	β^{+}	^{83}Sr	(9/2+)	
^{83m}Y	62.04(10) keV			1973	2.85(2) min	β^{+} (60%)	^{83}Sr	(3/2−)	
^{83m}Y	62.04(10) keV			1973	2.85(2) min	IT (40%)	^{83}Y	(3/2−)	
^{84}Y	39	45	83.9206711(46)	1962	39.5(8) min	β^{+}	^{84}Sr	(6+)	
^{84m1}Y	67.0(2) keV			1976	4.6(2) s	β^{+}	^{84}Sr	1+	
^{84m2}Y	210.42(16) keV			2005	292(10) ns	IT	^{84}Y	4−	
^{85}Y	39	46	84.916433(20)	1952	2.68(5) h	β^{+}	^{85}Sr	(1/2)−	
^{85m1}Y	19.68(17) keV			1963	4.86(20) h	β^{+}	^{85}Sr	(9/2)+	
^{85m1}Y	19.68(17) keV			1963	4.86(20) h	IT?	^{85}Y	(9/2)+	
^{85m2}Y	266.18(10) keV			1977	178(7) ns	IT	^{85}Y	(5/2)−	
^{86}Y	39	47	85.914886(15)	1951	14.74(2) h	β^{+}	^{86}Sr	4−	
^{86m1}Y	218.21(9) keV			1961	47.4(4) min	IT (99.31%)	^{86}Y	(8+)	
^{86m1}Y	218.21(9) keV			1961	47.4(4) min	β^{+} (0.69%)	^{86}Sr	(8+)	
^{86m2}Y	302.18(9) keV			2000	125.3(55) ns	IT	^{86}Y	6+	
^{87}Y	39	48	86.9108761(12)	1940	79.8(3) h	β^{+}	^{87}Sr	1/2−	
^{87m}Y	380.82(7) keV			1940	13.37(3) h	IT (98.43%)	^{87}Y	9/2+	
^{87m}Y	380.82(7) keV			1940	13.37(3) h	β^{+} (1.57%)	^{87}Sr	9/2+	
^{88}Y	39	49	87.9095013(16)	1948	106.629(24) d	β^{+}	^{88}Sr	4−	
^{88m1}Y	392.86(9) keV			1955	301(3) μs	IT	^{88}Y	1+	
^{88m2}Y	674.55(4) keV			1962	13.98(17) ms	IT	^{88}Y	8+	
^{89}Y (Note: Fission product)	39	50	88.90583816(36)	1923	Stable			1/2−	1.0000
^{89m}Y	908.97(3) keV			1951	15.663(5) s	IT	^{89}Y	9/2+	
^{90}Y	39	51	89.90714175(38)	1937	64.05(5) h	β^{−}	^{90}Zr	2−	
^{90m}Y	682.01(5) keV			1961	3.226(11) h	IT	^{90}Y	7+	
^{90m}Y	682.01(5) keV			1961	3.226(11) h	β^{−} (0.0018%)	^{90}Zr	7+	
^{91}Y	39	52	90.9072980(20)	1943	58.51(6) d	β^{−}	^{91}Zr	1/2−	
^{91m}Y	555.58(5) keV			1943	49.71(4) min	IT	^{91}Y	9/2+	
^{91m}Y	555.58(5) keV			1943	49.71(4) min	β^{−}?	^{91}Zr	9/2+	
^{92}Y	39	53	91.9089458(98)	1940	3.54(1) h	β^{−}	^{92}Zr	2−	
^{92m}Y	807(50)# keV			2009	3.7(5) μs	IT	^{92}Y	7+#	
^{93}Y	39	54	92.909578(11)	1948	10.18(8) h	β^{−}	^{93}Zr	1/2−	
^{93m}Y	758.719(21) keV			1971	820(40) ms	IT	^{93}Y	9/2+	
^{94}Y	39	55	93.9115921(68)	1948	18.7(1) min	β^{−}	^{94}Zr	2−	
^{94m}Y	1202.3(10) keV			1999	1.304(12) μs	IT	^{94}Y	(5+)	
^{95}Y	39	56	94.9128197(73)	1959	10.3(1) min	β^{−}	^{95}Zr	1/2−	
^{95m}Y	1087.6(6) keV			1982	48.6(5) μs	IT	^{95}Y	9/2+	
^{96}Y	39	57	95.9159093(65)	1975	5.34(5) s	β^{−}	^{96}Zr	0−	
^{96m1}Y	1540(9) keV			1975	9.6(2) s	β^{−}	^{96}Zr	8+	
^{96m2}Y	1655.0(11) keV			2017	181(9) ns	IT	^{96}Y	(6+)	
^{97}Y	39	58	96.9182867(72)	1970	3.75(3) s	β^{−} (99.945%)	^{97}Zr	1/2−	
^{97}Y	39	58	96.9182867(72)	1970	3.75(3) s	β^{−}, n (0.055%)	^{96}Zr	1/2−	
^{97m1}Y	667.52(23) keV			1978	1.17(3) s	β^{−} (>99.2%)	^{97}Zr	9/2+	
^{97m1}Y	667.52(23) keV			1978	1.17(3) s	IT (<0.7%)	^{97}Y	9/2+	
^{97m1}Y	667.52(23) keV			1978	1.17(3) s	β^{−}, n (0.11%)	^{96}Zr	9/2+	
^{97m2}Y	3522.6(4) keV			1986	142(8) ms	IT (94.8%)	^{97}Y	(27/2−)	
^{97m2}Y	3522.6(4) keV			1986	142(8) ms	β^{−} (5.2%)	^{97}Zr	(27/2−)	
^{98}Y	39	59	97.9223948(85)	1970	548(2) ms	β^{−} (99.67%)	^{98}Zr	0−	
^{98}Y	39	59	97.9223948(85)	1970	548(2) ms	β^{−}, n (0.33%)	^{97}Zr	0−	
^{98m1}Y	170.78(5) keV			2017	615(8) ns	IT	^{98}Y	2−	
^{98m2}Y	465.7(7) keV			1977	2.32(8) s	β^{−} (96.56%)	^{98}Zr	(6,7)+	
^{98m2}Y	465.7(7) keV			1977	2.32(8) s	β^{−}, n (3.44%)	^{97}Zr	(6,7)+	
^{98m2}Y	465.7(7) keV			1977	2.32(8) s	IT?	^{98}Y	(6,7)+	
^{98m3}Y	496.10(11) keV			2017	6.90(54) μs	IT	^{98}Y	(4)−	
^{98m4}Y	594(10) keV			2017	180(7) ns	IT	^{98}Y	(3−,4−)	
^{98m5}Y	972.17(20) keV			1970	450(150) ns	IT	^{98}Y	(8+)	
^{98m6}Y	1181.50(18) keV			2017	762(14) ns	IT	^{98}Y	(10−)	
^{99}Y	39	60	98.9241608(71)	1975	1.484(7) s	β^{−} (98.23%)	^{99}Zr	5/2+	
^{99}Y	39	60	98.9241608(71)	1975	1.484(7) s	β^{−}, n (1.77%)	^{98}Zr	5/2+	
^{99m}Y	2141.65(19) keV			1985	8.2(4) μs	IT	^{99}Y	(17/2+)	
^{100}Y	39	61	99.927728(12)	1977	940(30) ms	β^{−}	^{100}Zr	4+	
^{100}Y	39	61	99.927728(12)	1977	940(30) ms	β^{−}, n?	^{99}Zr	4+	
^{100m}Y	144(16) keV			1977	727(6) ms	β^{−} (98.92%)	^{100}Zr	1+#	
^{100m}Y	144(16) keV			1977	727(6) ms	β^{−}, n (1.08%)	^{99}Zr	1+#	
^{101}Y	39	62	100.9301608(76)	1983	426(20) ms	β^{−} (97.7%)	^{101}Zr	5/2+	
^{101}Y	39	62	100.9301608(76)	1983	426(20) ms	β^{−}, n (2.3%)	^{100}Zr	5/2+	
^{101m}Y	1205.0(10) keV			2009	870(90) ns	IT	^{101}Y	13/2−#	
^{102}Y	39	63	101.9343285(44)	1983	360(40) ms	β^{−} (>97.4%)	^{102}Zr	(5−)	
^{102}Y	39	63	101.9343285(44)	1983	360(40) ms	β^{−}, n (<2.6%)	^{101}Zr	(5−)	
^{102m}Y	100(100)# keV			1991	300(100) ms	β^{−} (>97.4%)	^{102}Zr	(0−,1−)	
^{102m}Y	100(100)# keV			1991	300(100) ms	β^{−}, n (<2.6%)	^{101}Zr	(0−,1−)	
^{102m}Y	100(100)# keV			1991	300(100) ms	IT?	^{102}Y	(0−,1−)	
^{103}Y	39	64	102.937244(12)	1994	239(12) ms	β^{−} (92.0%)	^{103}Zr	5/2+#	
^{103}Y	39	64	102.937244(12)	1994	239(12) ms	β^{−}, n (8.0%)	^{102}Zr	5/2+#	
^{104}Y	39	65	103.94194(22)#	1994	197(4) ms	β^{−} (66%)	^{104}Zr	(0+,1+)#	
^{104}Y	39	65	103.94194(22)#	1994	197(4) ms	β^{−}, n (34%)	^{103}Zr	(0+,1+)#	
^{104}Y	39	65	103.94194(22)#	1994	197(4) ms	β^{−}, 2n?	^{102}Zr	(0+,1+)#	
^{105}Y	39	66	104.94571(43)#	1994	95(9) ms	β^{−}	^{105}Zr	5/2+#	
^{105}Y	39	66	104.94571(43)#	1994	95(9) ms	β^{−}, n (<82%)	^{104}Zr	5/2+#	
^{105}Y	39	66	104.94571(43)#	1994	95(9) ms	β^{−}, 2n?	^{103}Zr	5/2+#	
^{106}Y	39	67	105.95084(54)#	1997	75(6) ms	β^{−}	^{106}Zr	2+#	
^{106}Y	39	67	105.95084(54)#	1997	75(6) ms	β^{−}, n?	^{105}Zr	2+#	
^{106}Y	39	67	105.95084(54)#	1997	75(6) ms	β^{−}, 2n?	^{104}Zr	2+#	
^{107}Y	39	68	106.95494(54)#	1997	33.5(3) ms	β^{−}	^{107}Zr	5/2+#	
^{107}Y	39	68	106.95494(54)#	1997	33.5(3) ms	β^{−}, n?	^{106}Zr	5/2+#	
^{107}Y	39	68	106.95494(54)#	1997	33.5(3) ms	β^{−}, 2n?	^{105}Zr	5/2+#	
^{108}Y	39	69	107.96052(64)#	2010	30(5) ms	β^{−}	^{108}Zr	6−#	
^{108}Y	39	69	107.96052(64)#	2010	30(5) ms	β^{−}, n?	^{107}Zr	6−#	
^{108}Y	39	69	107.96052(64)#	2010	30(5) ms	β^{−}, 2n?	^{106}Zr	6−#	
^{109}Y	39	70	108.96513(75)#	2010	25(5) ms	β^{−}	^{109}Zr	5/2+#	
^{109}Y	39	70	108.96513(75)#	2010	25(5) ms	β^{−}, n?	^{108}Zr	5/2+#	
^{109}Y	39	70	108.96513(75)#	2010	25(5) ms	β^{−}, 2n?	^{107}Zr	5/2+#	
^{110}Y	39	71		2021					
^{111}Y	39	72		2021					
This table header & footer:

== See also ==
Daughter products other than yttrium

- Isotopes of zirconium
- Isotopes of strontium
- Isotopes of rubidium
