= Reactor-grade plutonium =

Reactor-grade plutonium (RGPu) is the isotopic grade of plutonium that is found in spent nuclear fuel after the uranium-235 primary fuel that a nuclear power reactor uses has burnt up. The uranium-238 from which most of the plutonium isotopes derive by neutron capture is found along with the U-235 in the low enriched uranium fuel of civilian reactors.

In contrast to the low burnup of weeks or months that is commonly required to produce weapons-grade plutonium (WGPu/^{239}Pu), the long time in the reactor that produces reactor-grade plutonium leads to transmutation of much of the fissile, relatively long half-life isotope ^{239}Pu into a number of other isotopes of plutonium that are less fissile or more radioactive. When ^{239}Pu absorbs a neutron, it does not always undergo nuclear fission. Sometimes neutron absorption will instead produce ^{240}Pu at the neutron temperatures and fuel compositions present in typical light water reactors, with the concentration of ^{240}Pu steadily rising with longer irradiation, producing lower and lower grade plutonium as time goes on.

Generation II thermal-neutron reactors (today's most numerous nuclear power stations) can reuse reactor-grade plutonium only to a limited degree as MOX fuel, and only for a second cycle. Fast-neutron reactors, of which there are a handful operating today with a half dozen under construction, can use reactor-grade plutonium fuel as a means to reduce the transuranium content of spent nuclear fuel/nuclear waste. Russia has also produced a new type of Remix fuel that directly recycles reactor grade plutonium at 1% or less concentration into fresh or re-enriched uranium fuel imitating the 1% plutonium level of high-burnup fuel.

== Classification by isotopic composition ==
	<1976	>1976
<7%	Weapons grade	
7-19%	Reactor grade	Fuel grade
>19%	Reactor grade	Reactor grade

At the beginning of the industrial scale production of plutonium-239 in war era production reactors, trace contamination or co-production with plutonium-240 was initially observed, with these trace amounts resulting in the dropping of the Thin Man weapon-design as unworkable. The difference in purity, of how much, continues to be important in assessing significance in the context of nuclear proliferation and weapons-usability.

Percentages are of each nuclide's total transmutation rate in a LWR, which is low for many nonfissile actinides. After leaving reactor only decay occurs.

The DOE definition of reactor grade plutonium changed in 1976. Before this, three grades were recognised. The change in the definition for reactor grade, from describing plutonium with greater than 7% Pu-240 content prior to 1976, to reactor grade being defined as containing 19% or more Pu-240, coincides with the 1977 release of information about a 1962 "reactor grade nuclear test". The question of which definition or designation applies, that of the old or new scheme, to the 1962 "reactor-grade" test, has not been officially disclosed.

- Super weapons grade, less than 3% Pu-240,
- Weapons grade, less than 7% Pu-240 and
- Reactor grade, 7% or more Pu-240.

From 1976, four grades were recognised:

- Super weapons grade, less than 3% Pu-240
- Weapons grade, less than 7% Pu-240,
- Fuel grade, 7% to 19% Pu-240 and
- Reactor grade, more than 19% Pu-240.

Reprocessing or recycling of the spent fuel from the most common class of civilian-electricity-generating or power reactor design, the LWR, (with examples being the PWR or BWR) recovers reactor grade plutonium (as defined since 1976), not fuel grade.

The physical mixture of isotopes in reactor-grade plutonium make it extremely difficult to handle and form and therefore explains its undesirability as a weapon-making substance, in contrast to weapons grade plutonium, which can be handled relatively safely with thick gloves.

To produce weapons grade plutonium, the uranium nuclear fuel must spend no longer than several weeks in the reactor core before being removed, creating a low fuel burnup. For this to be carried out in a pressurized water reactor - the most common reactor design for electricity generation - the reactor would have to prematurely reach cold shut down after only recently being fueled, meaning that the reactor would need to cool decay heat and then have its reactor pressure vessel be depressurized, followed by a fuel rod defueling. If such an operation were to be conducted, it would be easily detectable, and require prohibitively costly reactor modifications.

One example of how this process could be detected in PWRs, is that during these periods, there would be a considerable amount of down time, that is, large stretches of time that the reactor is not producing electricity to the grid. On the other hand, the modern definition of "reactor grade" plutonium is produced only when the reactor is run at high burnups and therefore producing a high electricity generating capacity factor. According to the US Energy Information Administration (EIA), in 2009 the capacity factor of US nuclear power stations was higher than all other forms of energy generation, with nuclear reactors producing power approximately 90.3% of the time and Coal thermal power plants at 63.8%, with down times being for simple routine maintenance and refuelling.

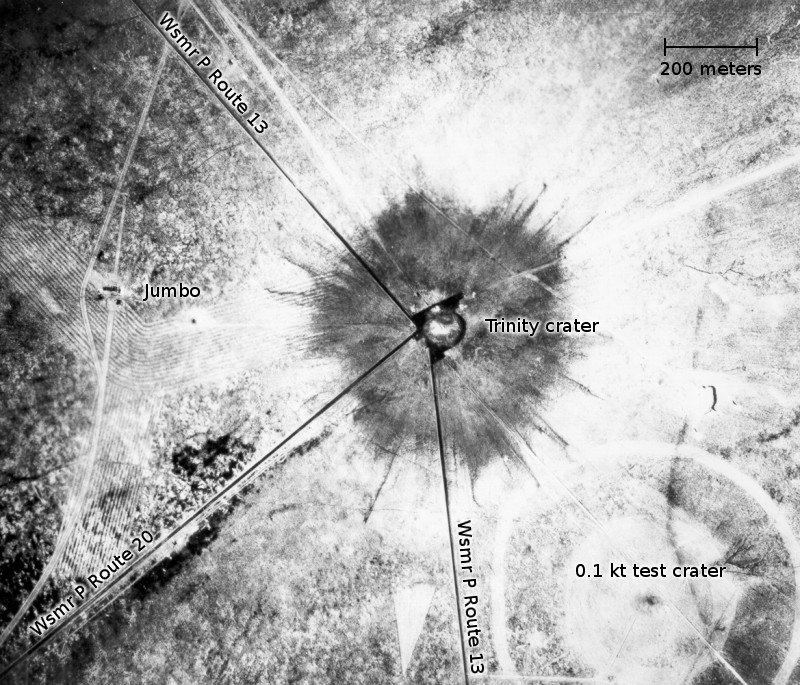
An aerial photograph of the Trinity (nuclear test) crater shortly after the test. With an almost identical design to the Fat Man bomb used in Nagasaki, both used what now would be defined as super weapons grade plutonium, It employed a natural uranium tamper that contributed approximately 1/4 of the final explosive energy and in total released an estimated energy of 22 kiloton or 22,000 tons of TNT equivalent. (Note: The energy of the blast wave was equivalent to that of 10 kiloton of TNT, whereas the remaining ~12 kiloton of energy was emitted as nuclear radiations : X-ray, gamma, beta, nuclear fallout etc.) The smaller crater in the southeast corner was from the earlier calibration test explosion, that used a conventional mass of high explosives of 0.1 kiloton or 108 tons of TNT (450 GJ).

The degree to which typical Generation II reactor high burn-up produced reactor-grade plutonium is less useful than weapons-grade plutonium for building nuclear weapons is somewhat debated, with many sources arguing that the maximum probable theoretical yield would be bordering on a fizzle explosion of the range 0.1 to 2 kiloton in a Fat Man type device. As computations state that the energy yield of a nuclear explosive decreases by one and two orders of magnitude if the 240 Pu content increases from 5% (nearly weapons-grade plutonium) to 15%( 2 kt) and 25%,(0.2 kt) respectively. These computations are theoretical and assume the non-trivial issue of dealing with the heat generation from the higher content of non-weapons usable Pu-238 could be overcome. As the premature initiation from the spontaneous fission of Pu-240 would ensure a low explosive yield in such a device, the surmounting of both issues in the construction of an Improvised nuclear device is described as presenting "daunting" hurdles for a Fat Man-era implosion design, and the possibility of terrorists achieving this fizzle yield being regarded as an "overblown" apprehension with the safeguards that are in place.

Others disagree on theoretical grounds and state that while they would not be suitable for stockpiling or being emplaced on a missile for long periods of time, dependably high non-fizzle level yields can be achieved, arguing that it would be "relatively easy" for a well funded entity with access to fusion boosting tritium and expertise to overcome the problem of pre-detonation created by the presence of Pu-240, and that a remote manipulation facility could be utilized in the assembly of the highly radioactive gamma ray emitting bomb components, coupled with a means of cooling the weapon pit during storage to prevent the plutonium charge contained in the pit from melting, and a design that kept the implosion mechanisms high explosives from being degraded by the pit's heat. However, with all these major design considerations included, this fusion boosted reactor grade plutonium primary will still fizzle if the fission component of the primary does not deliver more than 0.2 kilotons of yield, which is regarded as the minimum energy necessary to start a fusion burn. The probability that a fission device would fail to achieve this threshold yield increases as the burnup value of the fuel increases.

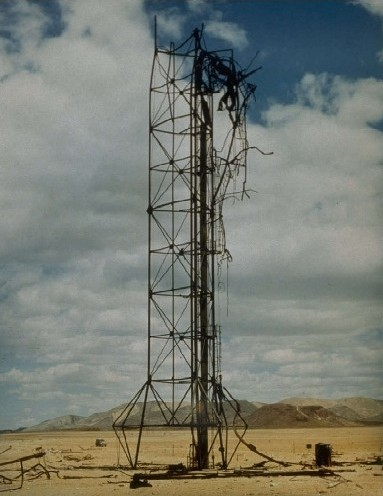
Tower of the Upshot–Knothole Ruth test. During the early development of nuclear explosive devices, available fissile material that differed from the conventional special nuclear material forms, were tested. Pictured, is the results of a uranium hydride device. Post-shot limited structural damage from the fizzle explosion, estimated as equivalent to the same nuclear energy emitted as 200 tons of the chemical energy in TNT(0.2 kilotons) failed to demolish the testing tower, only somewhat damaging it.

No information available in the public domain suggests that any well funded entity has ever seriously pursued creating a nuclear weapon with an isotopic composition similar to modern, high burnup, reactor grade plutonium. All nuclear weapon states have taken the more conventional path to nuclear weapons by either uranium enrichment or producing low burnup, "fuel-grade" and weapons-grade plutonium, in reactors capable of operating as production reactors, the isotopic content of reactor-grade plutonium, created by the most common commercial power reactor design, the pressurized water reactor, never directly being considered for weapons use.

As of April 2012, there were thirty-one countries that have civil nuclear power plants, of which nine have nuclear weapons, and almost every nuclear weapons state began producing weapons first instead of commercial nuclear power plants. The re-purposing of civilian nuclear industries for military purposes would be a breach of the Non-proliferation treaty.

As nuclear reactor designs come in a wide variety and are sometimes improved over time, the isotopic ratio of what is deemed "reactor grade plutonium" in one design, as it compares to another, can differ substantially. For example, the British Magnox reactor, a Generation I gas cooled reactor(GCR) design, can rarely produce a fuel burnup of more than 2-5 GWd/tU. Therefore, the "reactor grade plutonium" and the purity of Pu-239 from discharged magnox reactors is approximately 80%, depending on the burn up value. In contrast, the generic civilian Pressurized water reactor, routinely does (typical for 2015 Generation II reactor) 45 GWd/tU of burnup, resulting in the purity of Pu-239 being 50.5%, alongside a Pu-240 content of 25.2%, The remaining portion includes much more of the heat generating Pu-238 and Pu-241 isotopes than are to be found in the "reactor grade plutonium" from a Magnox reactor.

== "Reactor-grade" plutonium nuclear tests ==
The reactor grade plutonium nuclear test was a "low-yield (under 20 kilotons)" underground nuclear test using non-weapons-grade plutonium conducted at the US Nevada Test Site in 1962. Some information regarding this test was declassified in July 1977, under instructions from President Jimmy Carter, as background to his decision to prohibit nuclear reprocessing in the US.

The plutonium used for the 1962 test device was produced by the United Kingdom, and provided to the US under the 1958 US-UK Mutual Defence Agreement.

The initial codename for the Magnox reactor design amongst the government agency which mandated it, the UKAEA, was the Pressurised Pile Producing Power and Plutonium (PIPPA) and as this codename suggests, the reactor was designed as both a power plant and, when operated with low fuel "burn-up"; as a producer of plutonium-239 for the nascent nuclear weapons program in Britain. This intentional dual-use approach to building electric power-reactors that could operate as production reactors in the early Cold War era, was typical of many nations' Generation I reactors. With these being designs all focused on giving access to fuel after a short burn-up, which is known as Online refuelling.

The 2006 North Korean nuclear test, the first by the DPRK, is also said to have had a Magnox reactor as the root source of its plutonium, operated in Yongbyon Nuclear Scientific Research Center in North Korea. This test detonation resulted in the creation of a low-yield fizzle explosion, producing an estimated yield of approximately 0.48 kilotons, from an undisclosed isotopic composition. The 2009 North Korean nuclear test likewise was based on plutonium. Both produced a yield of 0.48 to 2.3 kiloton of TNT equivalent respectively and both were described as fizzle events due to their low yield, with some commentators even speculating whether, at the lower yield estimates for the 2006 test, the blast may have been the equivalent of US$100,000 worth of ammonium nitrate.

The isotopic composition of the 1962 US-UK test has similarly not been disclosed, other than the description reactor grade, and it has not been disclosed which definition was used in describing the material for this test as reactor grade. According to Alexander DeVolpi, the isotopic composition of the plutonium used in the US-UK 1962 test could not have been what we now consider to be reactor-grade, and the DOE now implies, but doesn't assert, that the plutonium was fuel grade. Likewise, the World Nuclear Association suggests that the US-UK 1962 test had at least 85% plutonium-239, a much higher isotopic concentration than what is typically present in the spent fuel from the majority of operating civilian reactors.

In 2002 former Deputy Director General of the IAEA, Bruno Pelaud, stated that the DoE statement was misleading and that the test would have the modern definition of fuel-grade with a Pu-240 content of only 12%

In 1997 political analyst Matthew Bunn and presidential technology advisor John Holdren, both of the Belfer Center for Science and International Affairs, cited a 1990s official U.S. assessment of programmatic alternatives for plutonium disposition. While it does not specify which RGPu definition is being referred to, it nonetheless states that "reactor-grade plutonium (with an unspecified isotopic composition) can be used to produce nuclear weapons at all levels of technical sophistication," and "advanced nuclear weapon states such as the United States and Russia, using modern designs, could produce weapons from "reactor-grade plutonium" having reliable explosive yields, weight, and other characteristics generally comparable to those of weapons made from weapon-grade plutonium"

In a 2008 paper, Kessler et al. used a thermal analysis to conclude that a hypothetical nuclear explosive device was "technically unfeasible" using reactor grade plutonium from a reactor that had a burn up value of 30 GWd/t using "low technology" designs akin to Fat Man with spherical explosive lenses, or 55 GWd/t for "medium technology" designs.

According to the Kessler et al. criteria, "high-technology" hypothetical nuclear explosive devices (HNEDs), that could be produced by the experienced nuclear weapons states (NWSs) would be technically unfeasible with reactor-grade plutonium containing more than approximately 9% of the heat generating Pu-238 isotope.

== Typical isotopic composition of reactor grade plutonium ==
The British Magnox reactor, a Generation I gas cooled reactor (GCR) design, can rarely produce a fuel burnup of more than 2-5 GWd/tU. The Magnox reactor design was codenamed PIPPA (Pressurised Pile Producing Power and Plutonium) by the UKAEA to denote the plant's dual commercial (power reactor) and military (production reactor) role. The purity of Pu-239 from discharged magnox reactors is approximately 80%, depending on the burn up value.

In contrast, for example, a generic civilian Pressurized water reactor's spent nuclear fuel isotopic composition, following a typical Generation II reactor 45 GWd/tU of burnup, is 1.11% plutonium, of which 0.56% is Pu-239, and 0.28% is Pu-240, which corresponds to a Pu-239 content of 50.5% and a Pu-240 content of 25.2%. For a lower generic burn-up rate of 43,000 MWd/t, as published in 1989, the plutonium-239 content was 53% of all plutonium isotopes in the reactor spent nuclear fuel. The US NRC has stated that the commercial fleet of LWRs presently powering homes, had an average burnup of approximately 35 GWd/MTU in 1995, while in 2015, the average had improved to 45 GWd/MTU.

The odd numbered fissile plutonium isotopes present in spent nuclear fuel, such as Pu-239, decrease significantly as a percentage of the total composition of all plutonium isotopes (which was 1.11% in the first example above) as higher and higher burnups take place, while the even numbered non-fissile plutonium isotopes (e.g. Pu-238, Pu-240 and Pu-242) increasingly accumulate in the fuel over time.

As power reactor technology develops, one goal is to reduce the spent nuclear fuel volume by increasing fuel efficiency and simultaneously reducing down times as much as possible to increase the economic viability of electricity generated from fission-electric stations. To this end, the reactors in the U.S. have doubled their average burn-up rates from 20 to 25 GWd/MTU in the 1970s to over 45 GWd/MTU in the 2000s. Generation III reactors under construction have a designed-for burnup rate in the 60 GWd/tU range and a need to refuel once every 2 years or so. For example, the European Pressurized Reactor has a designed-for 65 GWd/t, and the AP1000 has a designed for average discharge burnup of 52.8 GWd/t and a maximum of 59.5 GWd/t. In-design generation IV reactors will have burnup rates yet higher still.

== Reuse in reactors ==
Separation of uranium and plutonium from spent nuclear fuel by the 1940s-1950s wet-chemical PUREX method. This chemical process is controversial as it is likewise the path that produces chemically pure WGPu.

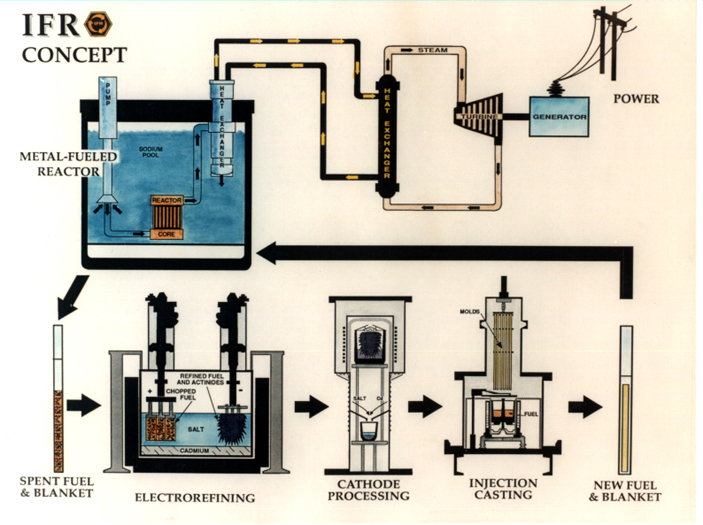
The 200+ GWd/TU of burnup fuel-cycle, proposed in the 1990s Integral fast reactor(IFR) concept (color), an animation of the pyroprocessing technology is also available. As opposed to the standard practice worldwide of PUREX separation, plutonium is not separated on its own in this pilot-scale, reprocessing cycle, rather all actinides are "electro-won" or "refined" from the "true waste" of fission products in spent fuel. The plutonium therefore instead comes over mixed with all the gamma and alpha emitting actinides, species that "self-protect" in numerous possible theft scenarios. For a reactor to operate on a full loading of this mixed actinide fuel, Fast neutron-spectrum reactors are without exception, the only variant considered possible.

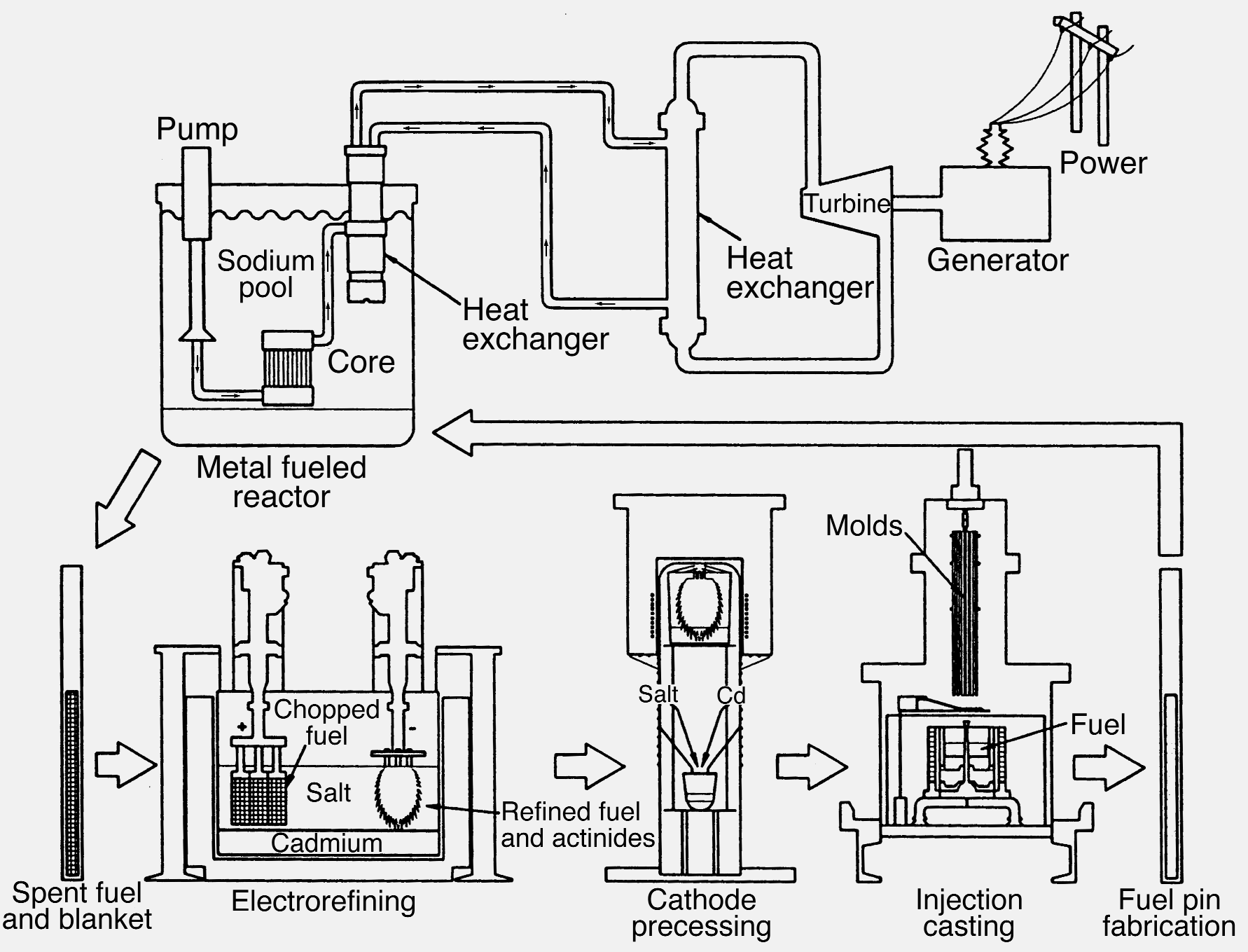
IFR concept (Black and White with clearer text). The pyroprocessing cycle is not limited to sodium-fast-reactors such as the depicted IFR, many other conceptual reactors such as the Stable salt reactor are designed to rely on fuel from it, rather than PUREX.

Today's moderated/thermal reactors primarily run on the once-through fuel cycle though they can reuse once-through reactor-grade plutonium to a limited degree in the form of mixed-oxide or MOX fuel, which is a routine commercial practice in most countries outside the US as it increases the sustainability of nuclear fission and lowers the volume of high level nuclear waste.

One third of the energy/fissions at the end of the practical fuel life in a thermal reactor are from plutonium, the end of cycle occurs when the U-235 percentage drops, the primary fuel that drives the neutron economy inside the reactor and the drop necessitates fresh fuel being required, so without design change, one third of the fissile fuel in a new fuel load can be fissile reactor-grade plutonium with one third less of Low enriched uranium needing to be added to continue the chain reactions anew, thus achieving a partial recycling.

A typical 5.3% reactor-grade plutonium MOX fuel bundle, is transmutated when it itself is again burnt, a practice that is typical in French thermal reactors, to a twice-through reactor-grade plutonium, with an isotopic composition of 40.8% ^{239}Pu and 30.6% ^{240}Pu at the end of cycle (EOC). (Note: with the rest being 14.9% ^{241}Pu, 10.6% ^{242}Pu and 3.1% ^{238}Pu) MOX grade plutonium (MGPu) is generally defined as having more than 30% ^{240}Pu.

A limitation in the number of recycles exists within thermal reactors, as opposed to the situation in fast reactors, as in the thermal neutron spectrum only the odd-mass isotopes of plutonium are fissile, the even-mass isotopes thus accumulate, in all high thermal-spectrum burnup scenarios. Plutonium-240, an even-mass isotope is, within the thermal neutron spectrum, a fertile material like uranium-238, becoming fissile plutonium-241 on neutron capture; however, the even-mass plutonium-242 not only has a low neutron capture cross section within the thermal spectrum, it also requires 3 neutron captures before becoming a fissile nuclide.

While most thermal neutron reactors must limit MOX fuel to less than half of the total fuel load for nuclear stability reasons, due to the reactor design operating within the limitations of a thermal spectrum of neutrons, Fast neutron reactors on the other hand can use plutonium of any isotopic composition, operate on completely recycled plutonium and in the fast "burner" mode, or fuel cycle, fission and thereby eliminate all the plutonium present in the world stockpile of once-through spent fuel. The modernized IFR design, known as the S-PRISM concept and the Stable salt reactor concept, are two such fast reactors that are proposed to burn-up/eliminate the plutonium stockpiles in Britain that was produced from operating its fleet of Magnox reactors generating the largest civilian stockpile of fuel-grade/"reactor-grade plutonium" in the world.

In the fast breeder reactor cycle, or fast breeder mode, as opposed to the fast-burner, the French Phénix reactor uniquely demonstrated multi-recycling and reuses of its reactor grade plutonium. Similar reactor concepts and fuel cycling, with the most well known being the Integral Fast Reactor are regarded as one of the few that can realistically achieve "planetary scale sustainability", powering a world of 10 billion, whilst still retaining a small environmental footprint. In breeder mode, fast reactors are therefore often proposed as a form of renewable or sustainable nuclear energy. Though the "[reactor-grade]plutonium economy" it would generate, presently returns social distaste and varied arguments about proliferation-potential, in the public mindset.

As is typically found in civilian European thermal reactors, a 5.3% plutonium MOX fuel-bundle, produced by conventional wet-chemical/PUREX reprocessing of an initial fuel assembly that generated 33 GWd/t before becoming spent nuclear fuel, creates, when it itself is burnt in the thermal reactor, a spent nuclear fuel with a plutonium isotopic composition of 40.8% ^{239}Pu and 30.6% ^{240}Pu.

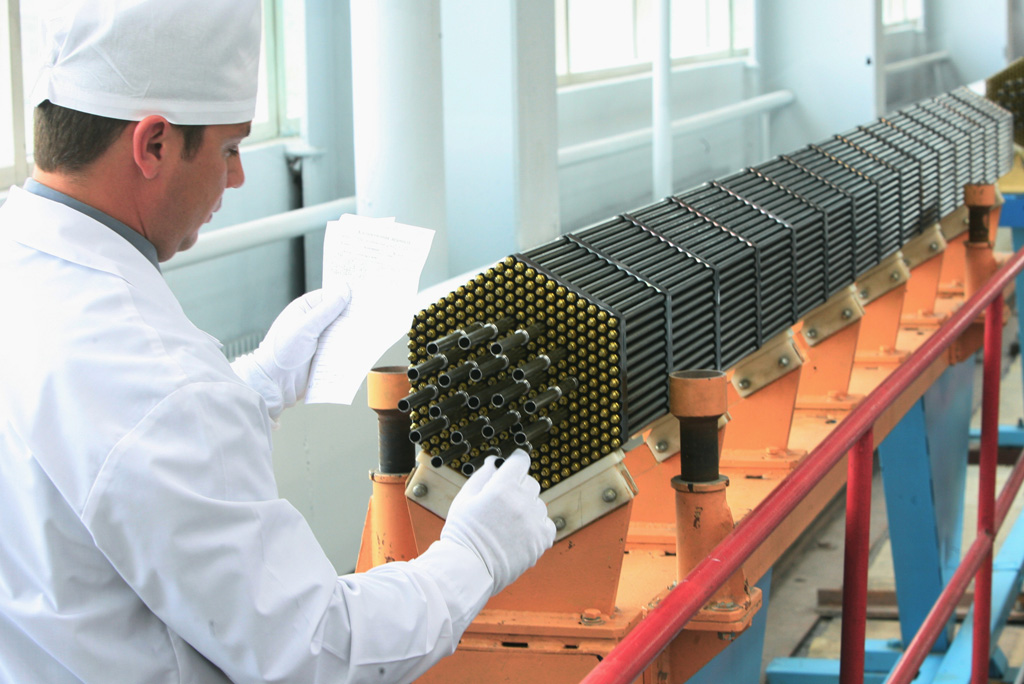
A fresh nuclear fuel rod assembly bundle, being inspected before entering a reactor

Computations state that the energy yield of a nuclear explosive decreases by two orders of magnitude if the ^{240}Pu content increases to 25%,(0.2 kt).

Reprocessing, which mainly takes the form of recycling reactor-grade plutonium back into the same or a more advanced fleet of reactors, was planned in the US in the 1960s. At that time the uranium market was anticipated to become crowded and supplies tight so together with recycling fuel, the more efficient fast breeder reactors were thereby seen as immediately needed to efficiently use the limited known uranium supplies. This became less urgent as time passed, with both reduced demand forecasts and increased uranium ore discoveries, for these economic reasons, fresh fuel and the reliance on solely fresh fuel remained cheaper in commercial terms than recycled.

In 1977 the Carter administration placed a ban on reprocessing spent fuel, in an effort to set an international example, as within the US, there is the perception that it would lead to nuclear weapons proliferation. This decision has remained controversial and is viewed by many US physicists and engineers as fundamentally in error, having cost the US taxpayer and the fund generated by US reactor utility operators, with cancelled programs and the over 1 billion dollar investment into the proposed alternative, that of Yucca Mountain nuclear waste repository ending in protests, lawsuits and repeated stop-and-go decisions depending on the opinions of new incoming presidents.

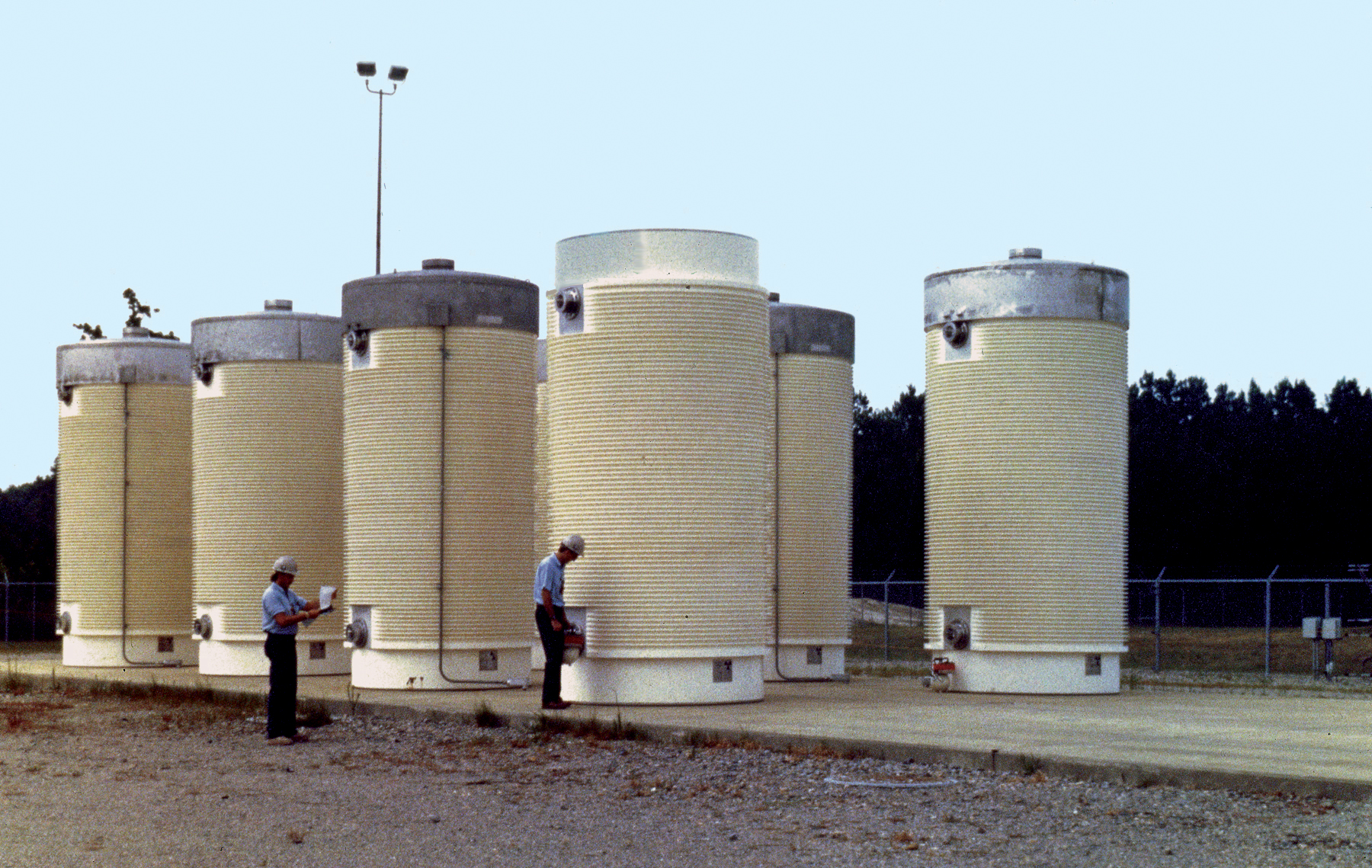
Following interim storage in a spent fuel pool, the bundles of used fuel assemblies of a typical nuclear power station are often stored on site in the likes of the eight dry cask storage vessels pictured above. At Yankee Rowe Nuclear Power Station, which generated 44 billion kilowatt hours of electricity over its lifetime in the US, its complete spent fuel inventory is contained within sixteen casks. They are now awaiting a shipment decision towards a geological repository or to a domestic/foreign reprocessing facility.

As the "undesirable" contaminant from a weapons manufacturing viewpoint, ^{240}Pu, decays faster than the ^{239}Pu, with half-lives of 6500 and 24,000 years respectively, the quality of the plutonium grade increases with time (although its total quantity decreases during that time as well). Thus, physicists and engineers have pointed out, as hundreds/thousands of years pass, the alternative to fast reactor "burning" or recycling of the plutonium from the world fleet of reactors until it is all burnt up, the alternative to burning most frequently proposed, that of deep geological repository, such as Onkalo spent nuclear fuel repository, have the potential to become "plutonium mines", from which weapons-grade material for nuclear weapons could be acquired by simple PUREX extraction, in the centuries-to-millennia to come.

== Nuclear terrorism target ==
Aum Shinrikyo, who succeeded in developing Sarin and VX nerve gas is regarded to have lacked the technical expertise to develop, or steal, a nuclear weapon. Similarly, Al Qaeda was exposed to numerous scams involving the sale of radiological waste and other non-weapons-grade material. The RAND corporation suggested that their repeated experience of failure and being scammed has possibly led to terrorists concluding that nuclear acquisition is too difficult and too costly to be worth pursuing.

== See also ==
- Uranium hydride bombs - produced a yield of about 0.2 kiloton
