= Integral fast reactor =

Nuclear reactor design

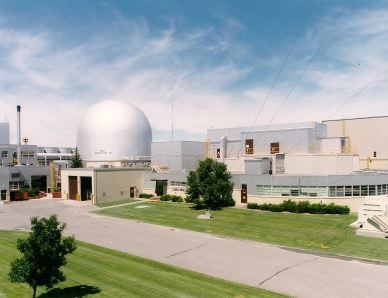
Experimental Breeder Reactor II, which served as the prototype for the integral fast reactor (IFR)

The integral fast reactor (IFR), originally the advanced liquid-metal reactor (ALMR), is a design for a nuclear reactor using fast neutrons and no neutron moderator (a "fast" reactor). IFRs can breed more fuel and are distinguished by a nuclear fuel cycle that uses reprocessing via electrorefining at the reactor site. The IFR was a sodium-cooled fast reactor (SFR) is its closest surviving fast breeder reactor, a type of Generation IV reactor.

The U.S. Department of Energy (DOE) began designing an IFR in 1984 and built a prototype, the Experimental Breeder Reactor II. On April 3, 1986, two tests demonstrated the safety of the IFR concept. These tests simulated accidents involving loss of coolant flow. Even with its normal shutdown devices disabled, the reactor shut itself down safely without overheating anywhere in the system. The IFR project was canceled by the US Congress in 1994, three years before completion.

S-PRISM (from SuperPRISM), also called PRISM (power reactor innovative small module), is the name of a nuclear power plant design by GE Vernova Hitachi Nuclear Energy based on the IFR. In 2022, GE Vernova Hitachi Nuclear Energy and TerraPower began exploring locating five Natrium SFR-based nuclear power plants in Kemmerer, Wyoming; the design incorporates a PRISM reactor plus TerraPower's Traveling Wave design with a molten salt storage system.

== History ==
Research on IFR reactors began in 1984 at Argonne National Laboratory in Argonne, Illinois, as a part of the U.S. Department of Energy's national laboratory system, and currently operated on a contract by the University of Chicago.

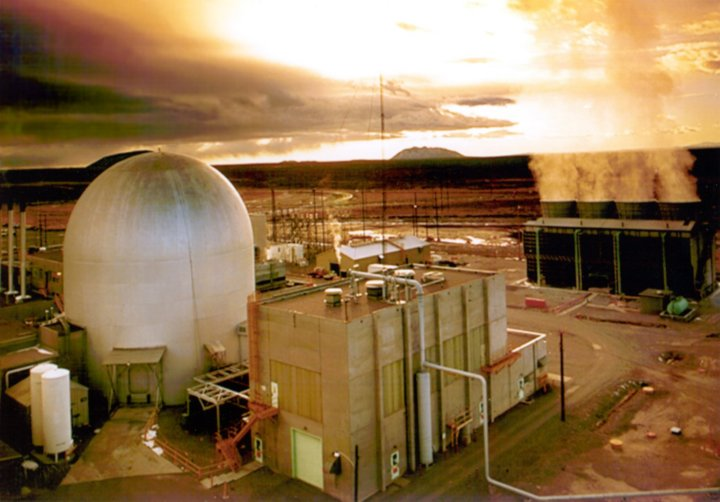
The Experimental Breeder Reactor II (EBR II)

Argonne previously had a branch campus named "Argonne West" in Idaho Falls, Idaho, that is now part of the Idaho National Laboratory. In the past, at the branch campus, physicists from Argonne West built what was known as the Experimental Breeder Reactor II (EBR-II). In the meantime, physicists at Argonne designed the IFR concept, and it was decided that the EBR-II would be converted to an IFR. Charles Till, a Canadian physicist from Argonne, was the head of the IFR project, and Yoon Chang was the deputy head. Till was positioned in Idaho, while Chang was in Illinois. Chang later served as acting director of Argonne.

The IFR concept is described in detail in Plentiful Energy: The Story of the Integral Fast Reactor.

=== Cancellation ===
With the election of President Bill Clinton in 1992, and the appointment of Hazel O'Leary as the Secretary of Energy, there was pressure from the top to cancel the IFR. Senator John Kerry (D-MA) and O'Leary led the opposition to the reactor, arguing that it would be a threat to non-proliferation efforts, and that it was a continuation of the Clinch River Breeder Reactor Project that had been canceled by Congress. Charles Till related that when he told Frank N. von Hippel, a science advisor to President Clinton, that it would cost more to terminate the research program and destroy the reactor than to finish the program and mothball the reactor, von Hippel replied "I know; it's a symbol. It has to go."

Simultaneously, in 1994 Energy Secretary O'Leary awarded the lead IFR scientist with $10,000 and a gold medal, with the citation stating his work to develop IFR technology provided "improved safety, more efficient use of fuel and less radioactive waste".

IFR opponents also presented a report by the DOE's Office of Nuclear Safety regarding a former Argonne employee's allegations that Argonne had retaliated against him for raising concerns about safety, as well as about the quality of research done on the IFR program. The report received international attention, with a notable difference in the coverage it received from major scientific publications. The British journal Nature entitled its article "Report backs whistleblower", and also noted conflicts of interest on the part of a DOE panel that assessed IFR research. In contrast, the article that appeared in Science was entitled "Was Argonne Whistleblower Really Blowing Smoke?".

=== Since 2000 ===
In 2001, as part of the Generation IV roadmap, the DOE tasked a 242-person team of scientists from DOE, UC Berkeley, Massachusetts Institute of Technology (MIT), Stanford, ANL, Lawrence Livermore National Laboratory, Toshiba, Westinghouse, Duke, EPRI, and other institutions to evaluate 19 of the best reactor designs on 27 different criteria. The IFR ranked #1 in their study which was released April 9, 2002.

At present, there are no integral fast reactors in commercial operation. However, the BN-800 reactor, a very similar fast reactor operated as a burner of plutonium stockpiles, became commercially operational in 2016.

== Technical overview ==
The IFR is cooled by liquid sodium and fueled by an alloy of uranium and plutonium. The fuel is contained in steel cladding with liquid sodium filling in the space between the fuel and the cladding. A void above the fuel allows helium and radioactive xenon to be collected safely without significantly increasing pressure inside the fuel element, and also allows the fuel to expand without breaching the cladding, making metal rather than oxide fuel practical. The advantages of liquid sodium coolant, as opposed to liquid metal lead, are that liquid sodium is far less dense and far less viscous (reduced pumping costs), is not corrosive (via dissolution) to common steels, and creates essentially no radioactive neutron activation byproducts. The disadvantage of sodium coolant, as opposed to lead coolant, is that sodium is chemically reactive, especially with water or air. Lead may be substituted for the eutectic alloy of lead and bismuth, as used as reactor coolant in Soviet Alfa-class submarines.

=== Basic design decisions ===
==== Metallic fuel ====
Metal fuel with a sodium-filled void inside the cladding to allow fuel expansion has been demonstrated in EBR-II. Pyroprocessing is primarily used for the reprocessing of metallic fuel.

Fabrication of metallic fuel is easier and cheaper than ceramic (oxide) fuel, especially under remote handling conditions.

Metallic fuel has better heat conductivity and lower heat capacity than oxide, which has safety advantages.

==== Sodium coolant ====
The use of liquid metal coolant removes the need for a pressure vessel around the reactor. Sodium has excellent nuclear characteristics, a high heat capacity and heat transfer capacity, low density, low viscosity, a reasonably low melting point and a high boiling point, and excellent compatibility with other materials including structural materials and fuel. The high heat capacity of the coolant and the elimination of water from the reactor core increase the inherent safety of the core.

==== Pool design rather than loop ====
Containing all of the primary coolant in a pool produces several safety and reliability advantages.

==== Onsite reprocessing using pyroprocessing ====
Reprocessing is essential to achieve most of the benefits of a fast reactor, improving fuel usage and reducing radioactive waste by several orders of magnitude.

Onsite processing is what makes the IFR "integral". This and the use of pyroprocessing both reduce proliferation risk.

Pyroprocessing (using an electrorefiner) has been demonstrated at EBR-II as practical on the scale required. Compared to the PUREX aqueous process, it is economical in capital cost, and is unsuitable for the production of weapons material, again unlike PUREX which was developed for weapons programs.

Pyroprocessing makes metallic fuel the fuel of choice. The two decisions are complementary.

== Advantages ==
Breeder reactors (such as the IFR) could in principle extract almost all of the energy contained in uranium or thorium, decreasing fuel requirements by nearly two orders of magnitude compared to traditional once-through reactors, which extract less than 0.65% of the energy in mined uranium, and less than 5% of the enriched uranium with which they are fueled. This could greatly dampen concern about fuel supply or energy used in mining.

What is more important today is why fast reactors are fuel-efficient: because fast neutrons can fission or "burn out" all the transuranic waste components. Transuranic waste consists of actinides – reactor-grade plutonium and minor actinides – many of which last tens of thousands of years or longer and make conventional nuclear waste disposal so problematic. Most of the radioactive fission products produced by an IFR have much shorter half-lives: they are intensely radioactive in the short term but decay quickly. Through many cycles, the IFR ultimately causes 99.9% of the uranium and transuranium elements to undergo fission and produce power; so, its only waste is the nuclear fission products. These have much shorter half-lives; in 300 years, their radioactivity will fall below that of the original uranium ore. The fact that 4th generation reactors are being designed to use the waste from 3rd generation plants could change the nuclear story fundamentally—potentially making the combination of 3rd and 4th generation plants a more attractive energy option than 3rd generation by itself would have been, both from the perspective of waste management and energy security.

"Integral" refers to on-site reprocessing by electrochemical pyroprocessing. This process separates spent fuel into 3 fractions: uranium, plutonium isotopes and other transuranium elements, and nuclear fission products. The uranium and transuranium elements are recycled into new fuel rods, and the fission products are eventually converted to glass and metal blocks for safer disposal. Because the combined transuranium elements and the fission products are highly radioactive, fuel-rod transfer and reprocessing operations use robotic or remote-controlled equipment. An additional claimed benefit of this is that since fissile material never leaves the facility (and would be lethal to handle if it did), this greatly reduces the proliferation potential of possible diversion of fissile material.

== Safety ==
In traditional light-water reactors (LWRs) the core must be maintained at a high pressure to keep the water liquid at high temperatures. In contrast, since the IFR is a liquid metal cooled reactor, the core could operate at close to ambient pressure, dramatically reducing the danger of a loss-of-coolant accident. The entire reactor core, heat exchangers, and primary cooling pumps are immersed in a pool of liquid sodium or lead, making a loss of primary coolant extremely unlikely. The coolant loops are designed to allow for cooling through natural convection, meaning that in the case of a power loss or unexpected reactor shutdown, the heat from the reactor core would be sufficient to keep the coolant circulating even if the primary cooling pumps were to fail.

The IFR also has passive safety advantages as compared with conventional LWRs. The fuel and cladding are designed such that when they expand due to increased temperatures, more neutrons would be able to escape the core, thus reducing the rate of the fission chain reaction. In other words, an increase in the core temperature acts as a feedback mechanism that decreases the core power. This attribute is known as a negative temperature coefficient of reactivity. Most LWRs also have negative reactivity coefficients; however, in an IFR, this effect is strong enough to stop the reactor from reaching core damage without external action from operators or safety systems. This was demonstrated in a series of safety tests on the prototype. Pete Planchon, the engineer who conducted the tests for an international audience, quipped "Back in 1986, we actually gave a small [20 MWe] prototype advanced fast reactor a couple of chances to melt down. It politely refused both times."

Liquid sodium presents safety problems because it ignites spontaneously on contact with air and can cause explosions on contact with water. This was the case at the Monju Nuclear Power Plant in a 1995 accident and fire. To reduce the risk of explosions following a leak of water from the steam turbines, the IFR design (as with other SFRs) includes an intermediate liquid-metal coolant loop between the reactor and the steam turbines. The purpose of this loop is to ensure that any explosion following the accidental mixing of sodium and turbine water would be limited to the secondary heat exchanger and not pose a risk to the reactor itself. Alternative designs use lead instead of sodium as the primary coolant. The disadvantages of lead are its higher density and viscosity, which increases pumping costs, and radioactive activation products resulting from neutron absorption. A lead-bismuth eutectate, as used in some Russian submarine reactors, has lower viscosity and density, but the same activation product problems can occur.

== Efficiency and fuel cycle ==
Medium-lived fission products
Nuclide	t_{1/2}	Yield	Q (Note: Decay energy is split among β, neutrino, and γ if any.)	βγ
	(a)	(%) (Note: Per 65 thermal neutron fissions of ^{235}U and 35 of ^{239}Pu.)	(keV)	
^{155}Eu	4.74	0.0803 (Note: Neutron poison; in thermal reactors, most is destroyed by further neutron capture.)	252	βγ
^{85}Kr	10.73	0.2180 (Note: Less than 1/4 of mass-85 fission products as most bypass ground state: ^{85}Br → ^{85m}Kr → ^{85}Rb.)	687	βγ
^{113m}Cd	13.9	0.0008	316	β
^{90}Sr	28.91	4.505	2826 (Note: Has decay energy 546 keV; its decay product ^{90}Y has decay energy 2.28 MeV with weak gamma branching.)	β
^{137}Cs	30.04	6.337	1176	βγ
^{121m}Sn	43.9	0.00005	390	βγ
^{151}Sm	94.6	0.5314	77	β

The goals of the IFR project were to increase the efficiency of uranium usage by breeding plutonium and to eliminate the need for transuranic isotopes to ever leave the site. The reactor was an unmoderated design running on fast neutrons, designed to allow any transuranic isotope to be consumed (and in some cases used as fuel).

Compared to current light-water reactors with a once-through fuel cycle that induces fission (and derives energy) from less than 1% of the uranium found in nature, a breeder reactor like the IFR has a very efficient fuel cycle (99.5% of uranium undergoes fission). The basic scheme uses pyroelectric separation, a common method in other metallurgical processes, to remove transuranics and actinides from the wastes and concentrate them. These concentrated fuels are then reformed, on-site, into new fuel elements.

The available fuel metals are never separated from the plutonium isotopes nor from all the fission products, and are therefore relatively difficult to use in nuclear weapons. Also, as plutonium never has to leave the site, it is far less open to unauthorized diversion.

Another important benefit of removing the long-half-life transuranics from the waste cycle is that the remaining waste becomes a much shorter-term hazard. After the actinides (reprocessed uranium, plutonium, and minor actinides) are recycled, the remaining radioactive waste isotopes are fission products – with half-lives of 90 years (Sm-151) and less, or 211,100 years (Tc-99) and more – plus any activation products from the non-fuel reactor components.

== Comparisons to light-water reactors ==
Transmutation flow between ^{238}Pu and ^{244}Cm in a LWR. Current thermal-neutron fission reactors cannot fission actinide nuclides that have an even number of neutrons. Thus, these build up and are generally treated as transuranic waste after conventional reprocessing. An argument for fast reactors is that they can fission all actinides.

=== Nuclear waste ===
The waste products of IFR reactors either have a short half-life, which means that they decay quickly and become relatively safe, or a long half-life, which means that they are only slightly radioactive. Neither of the two forms of IFR waste produced contain plutonium or other actinides. Due to pyroprocessing, the total volume of true waste/fission products is 1/20th the volume of spent fuel produced by a light-water plant of the same power output, and is often considered to be all unusable waste. 70% of fission products are either stable or have half-lives under one year. Technetium-99 and iodine-129, which constitute 6% of fission products, have very long half-lives but can be transmuted to isotopes with very short half-lives (15.46 seconds and 12.36 hours) by neutron absorption within a reactor, effectively destroying them (see more: long-lived fission products). Zirconium-93, another 5% of fission products, could in principle be recycled into fuel-pin cladding, where it does not matter that it is radioactive. Excluding the contribution from transuranic waste (TRU) – which are isotopes produced when uranium-238 captures a slow thermal neutron in an LWR but does not fission – all high level waste/fission products remaining after reprocessing the TRU fuel is less radiotoxic (in sieverts) than natural uranium (in a gram-to-gram comparison) within 200–400 years, and continues to decline afterward.

The on-site reprocessing of fuel means that the volume of high-level nuclear waste leaving the plant is tiny compared to LWR spent fuel. (Note: Estimates from Argonne National Laboratory place the output of waste of a 1,000 MWe plant operating at 70% capacity at 1,700 pounds/year.) In fact, in the U.S. most spent LWR fuel has remained in storage at the reactor site instead of being transported for reprocessing or placement in a geological repository. The smaller volumes of high level waste from reprocessing could stay at reactor sites for some time, but are intensely radioactive from medium-lived fission products (MLFPs) and need to be stored securely, like in dry cask storage vessels. In its first few decades of use, before the MLFPs decay to lower levels of heat production, geological repository capacity is constrained not by volume but by heat generation. This limits early repository emplacement. Decay heat generation of MLFPs from IFRs is about the same per unit power as from any kind of fission reactor.

The potential complete removal of plutonium from the waste stream of the reactor reduces the concern that now exists with spent nuclear fuel from most other reactors, namely that a spent fuel repository could be used as a plutonium mine at some future date. Also, despite the million-fold reduction in radiotoxicity offered by this scheme, (Note: Radioactivity and its associated dangers are roughly divided by an isotope's half-life. For example, given the 213,000-year half-life of technetium-99, combined with the IFR's 1/20 volume reduction, produces about 1/4,000,000 of the radiotoxicity of light-water reactor waste. The small size (about 1.5 tonnes per gigawatt-year) permits expensive disposal methods such as insoluble synthetic rock. The hazards are far less than those from fossil fuel wastes or dam failures.) there remain concerns about radioactive longevity:

[Some believe] that actinide removal would offer few if any significant advantages for disposal in a geologic repository because some of the fission product [sic] nuclides of greatest concern in scenarios such as leaching into groundwater actually have longer half-lives than the radioactive actinides. The concern about a waste cannot end after hundreds of years even if all the actinides are removed when the remaining waste contains radioactive fission products such as technetium-99, iodine-129, and cesium-135 with the half-lives between 213,000 and 15.7 million years.

However, these concerns do not consider the plan to store such materials in insoluble Synroc, and do not measure hazards in proportion to those from natural sources such as medical x-rays, cosmic rays, or naturally radioactive rocks (such as granite). Furthermore, some of the radioactive fission products are being targeted for transmutation, belaying even these comparatively low concerns. For example, the IFR's positive void coefficient could be reduced to an acceptable level by adding technetium to the core, helping destroy the long-lived fission product technetium-99 by nuclear transmutation in the process.

=== Carbon dioxide ===
Both IFRs and LWRs do not emit CO_{2} during operation, although construction and fuel processing result in CO_{2} emissions (if via energy sources which are not carbon neutral, such as fossil fuels) and CO_{2}-emitting cements are used in the construction process.

A 2012 Yale University review analyzing CO_{2} life cycle assessment (LCA) emissions from nuclear power determined that:

The collective LCA literature indicates that life cycle GHG [greenhouse gas] emissions from nuclear power are only a fraction of traditional fossil sources and comparable to renewable technologies.

Although the paper primarily dealt with data from Generation II reactors, and did not analyze the CO_{2} emissions by 2050 of the Generation III reactors presently under construction, it did summarize the LCA findings of in-development reactor technologies:

Theoretical FBRs [fast breeder reactors] have been evaluated in the LCA literature. The limited literature that evaluates this potential future technology reports median life cycle GHG emissions... similar to or lower than LWRs [light water reactors] and purports to consume little or no uranium ore.

Actinides and fission products by half-life
Actinides by decay chain				Half-life range (a)	Fission products of ^{235}U by yield
4n (Thorium)	4n + 1 (Neptunium)	4n + 2 (Radium)	4n + 3 (Actinium)	Half-life range (a)	4.5–7%	0.04–1.25%	<0.001%
^{228}Ra^{№}				4–6 a		^{155}Eu^{þ}
^{248}Bk				> 9 a
^{244}Cm^{ƒ}	^{241}Pu^{ƒ}	^{250}Cf	^{227}Ac^{№}	10–29 a	^{90}Sr	^{85}Kr	^{113m}Cd^{þ}
^{232}U^{ƒ}		^{238}Pu^{ƒ}	^{243}Cm^{ƒ}	29–97 a	^{137}Cs	^{151}Sm^{þ}	^{121m}Sn
	^{249}Cf^{ƒ}	^{242m}Am^{ƒ}		141–351 a	No fission products have a half-life in the range of 100 a–210 ka ...
	^{241}Am^{ƒ}		^{251}Cf^{ƒ}	430–900 a	No fission products have a half-life in the range of 100 a–210 ka ...
		^{226}Ra^{№}	^{247}Bk	1.3–1.6 ka	No fission products have a half-life in the range of 100 a–210 ka ...
^{240}Pu	^{229}Th	^{246}Cm^{ƒ}	^{243}Am^{ƒ}	4.7–7.4 ka	No fission products have a half-life in the range of 100 a–210 ka ...
	^{245}Cm^{ƒ}	^{250}Cm		8.3–8.5 ka	No fission products have a half-life in the range of 100 a–210 ka ...
			^{239}Pu^{ƒ}	24.1 ka	No fission products have a half-life in the range of 100 a–210 ka ...
		^{230}Th^{№}	^{231}Pa^{№}	32–76 ka	No fission products have a half-life in the range of 100 a–210 ka ...
^{236}Np^{ƒ}	^{233}U^{ƒ}	^{234}U^{№}		150–250 ka	^{99}Tc^{₡}	^{126}Sn
^{248}Cm		^{242}Pu		327–375 ka		^{79}Se^{₡}
				1.33 Ma	^{135}Cs^{₡}
	^{237}Np^{ƒ}			1.61–6.5 Ma	^{93}Zr	^{107}Pd
^{236}U			^{247}Cm^{ƒ}	15–24 Ma		^{129}I^{₡}
^{244}Pu				80 Ma	... nor beyond 15.7 Ma
^{232}Th^{№}		^{238}U^{№}	^{235}U^{ƒ№}	0.7–14.1 Ga	... nor beyond 15.7 Ma
₡, has thermal neutron capture cross section in the range of 8–50 barns; ƒ, fissile; №, primarily a naturally occurring radioactive material (NORM); þ, neutron poison (thermal neutron capture cross section greater than 3k barns)

=== Fuel cycle ===
Fast reactor fuel must be at least 20% fissile, greater than the low-enriched uranium used in LWRs. The fissile material can initially include highly enriched uranium or plutonium from LWR spent fuel, decommissioned nuclear weapons, or other sources. During operation, the reactor breeds more fissile material from fertile material – at most about 5% more from uranium and 1% more from thorium.

The fertile material in fast reactor fuel can be depleted uranium (mostly uranium-238), natural uranium, thorium, or reprocessed uranium from spent fuel from traditional LWRs, and even include nonfissile isotopes of plutonium and minor actinide isotopes. Assuming no leakage of actinides to the waste stream during reprocessing, a 1 GWe IFR-style reactor would consume about 1 ton of fertile material per year and produce about 1 ton of fission products.

The IFR fuel cycle's reprocessing by pyroprocessing (in this case, electrorefining) does not need to produce pure plutonium, free of fission product radioactivity, as the PUREX process is designed to do. The purpose of reprocessing in the IFR fuel cycle is simply to reduce the level of those fission products that are neutron poisons; even these need not be completely removed. The electrorefined spent fuel is highly radioactive, but because new fuel need not be precisely fabricated like LWR fuel pellets but can simply be cast, remote fabrication can be used, reducing exposure to workers.

Like any fast reactor, by changing the material used in the blankets, the IFR can be operated over a spectrum from breeder to self-sufficient to burner. In breeder mode (using U-238 blankets) the reactor produces more fissile material than it consumes. This is useful for providing fissile material for starting up other plants. Using steel reflectors instead of U-238 blankets, the reactor operates in pure burner mode and is not a net creator of fissile material; on balance, it will consume fissile and fertile material and, assuming loss-free reprocessing, output no actinides but only fission products and activation products. The amount of fissile material needed could be a limiting factor to very widespread deployment of fast reactors if stocks of surplus weapons plutonium and LWR spent fuel plutonium are not sufficient. To maximize the rate at which fast reactors can be deployed, they can be operated in maximum breeding mode.

Reprocessing nuclear fuel using pyroprocessing and electrorefining has not yet been demonstrated on a commercial scale, so investing in a large IFR-style plant may be a higher financial risk than a conventional LWR.

=== Passive safety ===
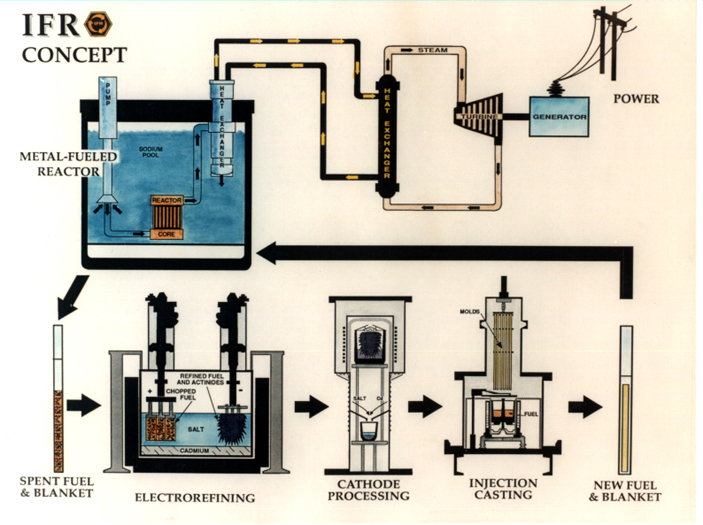
IFR concept (color); an animation of the pyroprocessing cycle is also available.

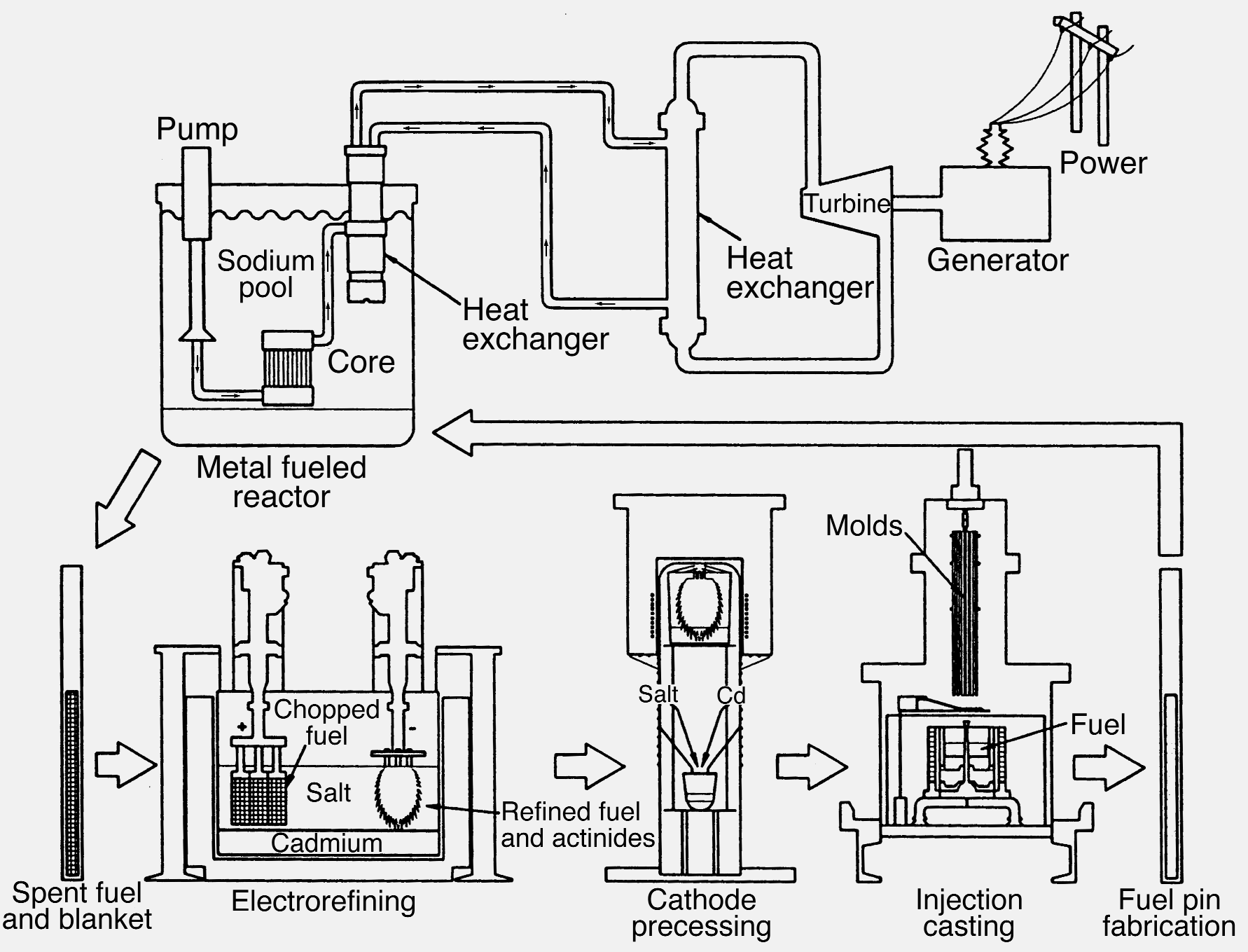
IFR concept (black and white with clearer text)

The IFR uses metal alloy fuel (uranium, plutonium, and/or zirconium), which is a good conductor of heat, unlike the uranium oxide used by LWRs (and even some fast breeder reactors), which is a poor conductor of heat and reaches high temperatures at the center of fuel pellets. The IFR also has a smaller volume of fuel, since the fissile material is diluted with fertile material by a ratio of 5 or less, compared to about 30 for LWR fuel. The IFR core requires more heat removal per core volume during operation than the LWR core; but on the other hand, after a shutdown, there is far less trapped heat that is still diffusing out and needs to be removed. However, decay heat generation from short-lived fission products and actinides is comparable in both cases, starting at a high level and decreasing with time elapsed after shutdown. The high volume of liquid sodium primary coolant in the pool configuration is designed to absorb decay heat without reaching fuel melting temperature. The primary sodium pumps are designed with flywheels so they will coast down slowly (90 seconds) if power is removed. This coast-down further aids core cooling upon shutdown. If the primary cooling loop were to be somehow suddenly stopped, or if the control rods were suddenly removed, the metal fuel can melt, as accidentally demonstrated in EBR-I; however, the melting fuel is then extruded up the steel fuel cladding tubes and out of the active core region leading to permanent reactor shutdown and no further fission heat generation or fuel melting. With metal fuel, the cladding is not breached and no radioactivity is released even in extreme overpower transients.

Self-regulation of the IFR's power level depends mainly on thermal expansion of the fuel, which allows more neutrons to escape, damping the chain reaction. LWRs have less effect from thermal expansion of fuel (since much of the core is the neutron moderator) but have strong negative feedback from Doppler broadening (which acts on thermal and epithermal neutrons, not fast neutrons) and negative void coefficient from boiling of the water moderator/coolant; the less dense steam returns fewer and less-thermalized neutrons to the fuel, which are more likely to be captured by U-238 than induce fissions. However, the IFR's positive void coefficient could be reduced to an acceptable level by adding technetium to the core, helping destroy the long-lived fission product named technetium-99 by nuclear transmutation in the process.

IFRs are able to withstand both a loss of flow without SCRAM and loss of heat sink without SCRAM. In addition to the passive shutdown of the reactor, the convection current generated in the primary coolant system will prevent fuel damage (core meltdown). These capabilities were demonstrated in the EBR-II. The ultimate goal is that no radioactivity is released under any circumstance.

The flammability of sodium is a risk to operators. Sodium burns easily in air and will ignite spontaneously on contact with water. The use of an intermediate coolant loop between the reactor and the turbines minimizes the risk of a sodium fire in the reactor core.

Under neutron bombardment, sodium-24 is produced. This is highly radioactive, emitting an energetic gamma ray of 2.7 MeV followed by a beta decay to form magnesium-24. Half-life is only 15 hours, so this isotope is not a long-term hazard. Nevertheless, the presence of sodium-24 further necessitates the use of the intermediate coolant loop between the reactor and the turbines.

=== Proliferation ===
IFRs and light-water reactors (LWRs) both produce reactor grade plutonium – which even at high burnups remains weapons-usable – but the IFR fuel cycle has some design features that make proliferation more difficult than the current PUREX recycling of spent LWR fuel. For one thing, it may operate at higher burnups and therefore increase the relative abundance of the non-fissile, but fertile, isotopes plutonium-238, plutonium-240, and plutonium-242.

Unlike PUREX reprocessing, the IFR's electrolytic reprocessing of spent fuel does not separate out pure plutonium. Instead, it is left mixed with minor actinides and some rare earth fission products, which makes the theoretical ability to make a bomb directly out of it considerably dubious. Rather than being transported from a large centralized reprocessing plant to reactors at other locations – as is common now in France, from La Hague to its dispersed nuclear fleet of LWRs – the IFR pyroprocessed fuel would be much more resistant to unauthorized diversion. The material with the mix of plutonium isotopes in an IFR would stay at the reactor site and then be burnt up practically in-situ; alternatively, if operated as a breeder reactor, some of the pyroprocessed fuel could be consumed by the reactor (or other reactors located elsewhere). However, as is the case with conventional aqueous reprocessing, it would remain possible to chemically extract all the plutonium isotopes from the pyroprocessed fuel. In fact, it would be much easier to do so from the recycled product than from the original spent fuel. However, doing so would still be more difficult when compared to another conventional recycled nuclear fuel, MOX, as the IFR recycled fuel contains more fission products and, due to its higher burnup, more proliferation-resistant Pu-240 than MOX.

An advantage to the removal and burn up of actinides (include plutonium) from the IFR's spent fuel is the elimination of concerns about leaving spent fuel (or indeed conventional – and therefore comparatively lower burnup – spent fuel, which can contain weapons-usable plutonium isotope concentrations) in a geological repository or dry cask storage, which could be mined in the future for the purpose of making weapons.

Because reactor-grade plutonium contains isotopes of plutonium with high spontaneous fission rates, and the ratios of these troublesome isotopes (from a weapons manufacturing point of view) only increases as the fuel is burnt up for longer and longer, it is considerably more difficult to produce fission nuclear weapons of substantial yield from highly burnt up spent fuel than from (conventional) moderately burnt up LWR spent fuel.

Therefore, proliferation risks are considerably reduced with the IFR system by many metrics, but not entirely eliminated. The plutonium from advanced liquid metal reactor (ALMR) recycled fuel would have an isotopic composition similar to that obtained from other highly burnt up spent nuclear fuel sources. Although this makes the material less attractive for weapons production, it could nonetheless be used in less sophisticated weapons or with fusion boosting.

In 1962, the U.S. government detonated a nuclear device using then-defined "reactor-grade plutonium", although in more recent categorizations it would instead be considered as fuel-grade plutonium, typical of that produced by low burn up Magnox reactors.

Plutonium produced in the fuel of a breeder reactor generally has a higher fraction of the isotope plutonium-240 than that produced in other reactors, making it less attractive for weapons use, particularly in first-generation nuclear weapon designs similar to Fat Man. This offers an intrinsic degree of proliferation resistance. However, if a blanket of uranium is used to surround the core during breeding, the plutonium made in the blanket is usually of a high Pu-239 quality, containing very little Pu-240, making it highly attractive for weapons use.

If operated as a breeder instead of a burner, the IFR has proliferation potential:

Although some recent proposals for the future of the ALMR/IFR concept have focused more on its ability to transform and irreversibly use up plutonium, such as the conceptual PRISM (reactor) and the in operation (2014) BN-800 reactor in Russia, the developers of the IFR acknowledge that it is 'uncontested that the IFR can be configured as a net producer of plutonium'. If instead of processing spent fuel, the ALMR system were used to reprocess irradiated fertile (breeding) material [that is, if a blanket of breeding U-238 was used] in the electrorefiner, the resulting plutonium would be a superior material, with a nearly ideal isotope composition for nuclear weapons manufacture.

=== Reactor design and construction ===
A commercial version of the IFR, S-PRISM, can be built in a factory and transported to the site. This small modular design (311 MWe modules) reduces costs and allows nuclear plants of various sizes (311 MWe and any integer multiple) to be economically constructed.

Cost assessments taking account of the complete life cycle show that fast reactors could be no more expensive than water-moderated water-cooled reactors, currently the most widely used reactors in the world.

=== Liquid metal sodium coolant ===
Unlike reactors that use relatively slow low energy (thermal) neutrons, fast-neutron reactors need nuclear reactor coolant that does not moderate or block neutrons (like water does in an LWR) so that they have sufficient energy to fission actinide isotopes that are fissionable but not fissile. The core must also be compact and contain the least amount of neutron-moderating material as possible. Metal sodium coolant in many ways has the most attractive combination of properties for this purpose. In addition to not being a neutron moderator, desirable physical characteristics include:

- Low melting temperature
- Low vapor pressure
- High boiling temperature
- Excellent thermal conductivity
- Low viscosity
- Light weight
- Thermal and radiation stability

Additional benefits to using liquid sodium include:

- Abundant and low-cost material
- Cleaning with chlorine produces non-toxic table salt
- Compatible with other materials used in the core (does not react or dissolve stainless steel), so no special corrosion protection measures are needed
- Low pumping power (from lightweight and low viscosity)
- Protects other components from corrosion by maintaining an oxygen- and water-free environment (sodium would react with any trace amounts to make sodium oxide or sodium hydroxide and hydrogen)
- Lightweight (low density) improves resistance to seismic inertia events (earthquakes)

Significant drawbacks to using sodium are its extreme fire hazardousness in the presence of any significant amounts of air (oxygen) and its spontaneous combustion with water, rendering sodium leaks and flooding dangerous. This was the case at the Monju Nuclear Power Plant in a 1995 accident and fire. Reactions with water produce hydrogen which can be explosive. The sodium activation product (isotope) ^{24}Na releases dangerous energetic photons when it decays (albeit having only short half-life of 15 hours). The reactor design keeps ^{24}Na in the reactor pool and carries away heat for power production using a secondary sodium loop, but this adds costs to construction and maintenance.

== See also ==
- Gas-cooled fast reactor – Type of nuclear reactor cooled by a gas
- Generation IV reactor – New nuclear reactor technologies under development
- Lead-cooled fast reactor – Fast-neutron nuclear reactor cooled by molten lead
- Molten salt reactor – Type of nuclear reactor cooled by molten salt
- Traveling wave reactor – Type of nuclear fission reactor
