= Pyroprocessing =

High temperature industrial processes

Pyroprocessing (from Greek Πυρος = fire) is a process in which materials are subjected to high temperatures (typically over 800 °C) in order to bring about a chemical or physical change. Pyroprocessing encompasses ore-roasting, calcination and sintering. Equipment for pyroprocessing includes kilns, electric arc furnaces and reverberatory furnaces.

Solvents are molten salts (e.g. LiCl + KCl or LiF + CaF_{2}) and molten metals (e.g. cadmium, bismuth, magnesium) rather than water and organic compounds. Electrorefining, distillation, and solvent-solvent extraction are common steps.

These processes were pioneered at Argonne National Laboratory with ongoing research in Russia, at CRIEPI in Japan, the Nuclear Research Institute of Řež in Czech Republic, Indira Gandhi Centre for Atomic Research in India and KAERI in South Korea.

Cement manufacturing is a common application. The raw material mix (raw meal) is fed to a kiln. As with most industries, pyroprocessing is the most energy-intensive part of the industrial process. The technique is under investigation for use in spent fuel reprocessing.

== Advantages ==
- Well-understood principles, and no significant technical barriers
- Applicable to high-burnup spent fuel
- Requires little cooling time, based on high operating temperatures
- Avoids hydrogen and carbon solvents, which are neutron moderators creating risk of criticality accidents and can absorb the fission product tritium and the activation product carbon-14 in dilute solutions that cannot be separated later.
  - Alternatively, voloxidation can recover 99% of the tritium from used fuel in solution suitable to supply tritium.
- More compact than aqueous methods, allowing on-site reprocessing at the reactor site
- Can avoid transporting spent fuel with its security issues, instead storing a much smaller volume of fission products on site as high-level waste. Integral Fast Reactor and Molten Salt Reactor fuel cycles are based on on-site pyroprocessing.
- It can separate many or even all actinides at once and produce highly radioactive fuel which is harder to manipulate for theft or making nuclear weapons. (However, the difficulty has been questioned.) In contrast the PUREX process was designed to separate plutonium only for weapons, and it also leaves the minor actinides (americium and curium) behind, producing waste with more long-lived radioactivity.
- Most of the radioactivity in roughly 10^{2} to 10^{5} years after the use of the nuclear fuel is produced by the actinides, since there are no fission products with half-lives in this range. These actinides can fuel fast reactors, so extracting and reusing (fissioning) them increases energy production per kg of fuel, as well as reducing the long-term radioactivity of the wastes.
- Fluoride volatility (see below) produces salts that can readily be used in molten salt reprocessing such as pyroprocessing.
- The ability to process "fresh" spent fuel reduces the needs for spent fuel pools (even if the recovered short-lived radionuclides are "only" sent to storage, that still requires less space as the bulk of the mass, uranium, can be stored separately from them). Uranium – even higher-specific-activity reprocessed uranium – does not need cooling for safe storage.
- Short-lived radionuclides can be recovered from "fresh" spent fuel, allowing either their direct use in industry science or medicine or the recovery of their decay products without contamination by other isotopes (for example: ruthenium in spent fuel decays to rhodium, all isotopes of which other than ^{103}Rh further decay to stable isotopes of palladium. Palladium derived from the decay of fission ruthenium and rhodium will be nonradioactive, but fission palladium contains significant contamination with long-lived ^{107}Pd. Ruthenium-107 and rhodium-107 both have half-lives on the order of minutes and decay to palladium-107 before reprocessing under most circumstances).
- Possible fuels for radioisotope thermoelectric generators (RTGs) that are mostly decayed in spent fuel, that has significantly aged, can be recovered in sufficient quantities to make their use worthwhile. Examples include materials with half-lives around two years such as ^{134}Cs, ^{125}Sb, ^{147}Pm. While those would perhaps not be suitable for lengthy space missions, they can be used to replace diesel generators in off-grid locations where refueling is possible once a year. (Note: a radioisotope with a two-year half-life will retain 0.5^0.5 or over 70% of its power after a year – all those isotopes have half-lives longer than two years and would thus retain even more power. Even if the yearly refueling window were to be missed, over half the power would still remain for the second refueling window) Antimony would be particularly interesting because it forms a stable alloy with lead and can thus be transformed relatively easily into a partially self-shielding and chemically inert form. Shorter-lived RTG fuels present the further benefit of reducing the risk of orphan sources as the activity will decline relatively quickly if no refueling is undertaken.

== Disadvantages ==
- Reprocessing as a whole is not currently (2005) in favor, and places that do reprocess already have PUREX plants constructed. Consequently, there is little demand for new pyrometallurgical systems, although there could be if the Generation IV reactor programs become reality.
- The used salt from pyroprocessing is less suitable for conversion into glass than the waste materials produced by the PUREX process.
- If the goal is to reduce the longevity of spent nuclear fuel in burner reactors, then better recovery rates of the minor actinides need to be achieved.
- Working with "fresh" spent fuel requires more shielding and better ways to deal with heat production than working with "aged" spent fuel does. If the facilities are built in such a way as to require high specific activity material, they cannot handle older "legacy waste" except blended with fresh spent fuel.

== Spent-fuel recycling ==
Argonne National Laboratory (ANL) pioneered the development of pyroprocessing for recycling spent fuel into fuel. Argonne demonstrated it paired with the EBR-II and proposed commercializing it in the Integral Fast Reactor. The latter was cancelled by the Clinton Administration in 1994. As of 2016, ANL researchers were developing and refining pyroprocessing technologies for both light water and fast reactors, with most based on electrorefining rather than conventional wet-chemical/PUREX.

Pyroprocessing of nuclear fuel rods attempts to combine separated plutonium with other elements such as neptunium, americium, or curium. Theoretically, you could still reuse mixed, pyroprocessed plutonium to generate nuclear power, but it wouldn’t be pure enough for other uses.

In South Korea, due to the historical Section 123 Agreement between ROK and the U.S., neither enrichment nor PUREX related reprocessing were permitted, with researchers therefore increasingly viewing the "proliferation resistant" pyroprocessing cycle, as the solution for the nation's growing spent fuel inventory, in 2017 forming a collaboration with the U.S and Japan to advance the economics of the process. In 2019, proponents of molten salt reactor (MSR) fuel cycles, frequently argue pairing the uncommercialized MSR with the pyroprocessing fuel cycle, as the MSR fuel is already in molten salt form, eliminating two process conversion steps, that of to-and-from metallic fuel, that both the commercially proposed IFR would have required and its antecedent physically demonstrated, when pyroprocessing was fielded in the EBR-II.
