= PUREX =

Spent fuel reprocessing process for plutonium and uranium recovery

Reprocessing of spent nuclear fuel by the PUREX method, first developed in the 1940s to produce plutonium for nuclear weapons, was demonstrated commercially in Belgium to partially re-fuel a LWR in the 1960s. This aqueous chemical process continues to be used commercially to separate reactor grade plutonium (RGPu) for reuse as MOX fuel. It remains controversial, as plutonium can be used to make nuclear weapons.

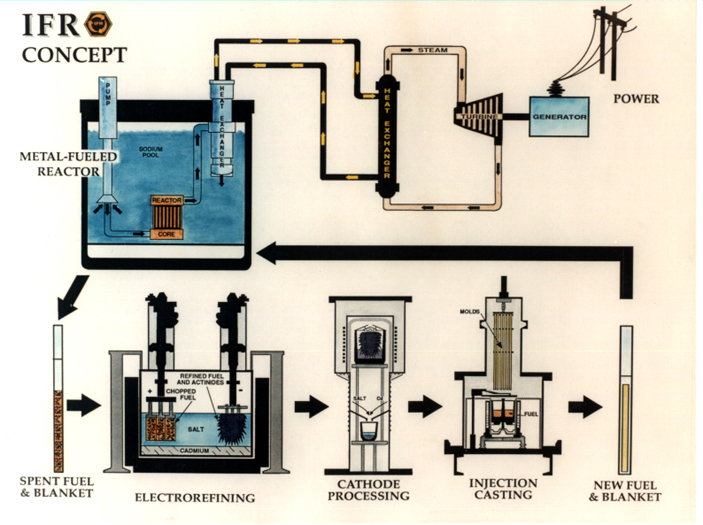
The most developed, though commercially unfielded, alternative reprocessing method, is pyroprocessing, suggested as part of the depicted metallic-fueled, integral fast reactor (IFR) a sodium fast reactor concept of the 1990s. After the spent fuel is dissolved in molten salt, all of the recyclable actinides, consisting largely of plutonium and uranium though with important minor constituents, are extracted using electrorefining/electrowinning. The resulting mixture keeps the plutonium at all times in an unseparated gamma and alpha emitting actinide form which is also mildly self-protecting in theft scenarios.

PUREX (plutonium uranium reduction extraction) is a chemical method used to purify fuel for nuclear reactors or nuclear weapons. It is based on liquid–liquid extraction ion-exchange. PUREX is the de facto standard aqueous nuclear reprocessing method for the recovery of uranium and plutonium from used nuclear fuel (spent nuclear fuel, or irradiated nuclear fuel). It is also the standard process used in industrial scale operations.

PUREX is applied to spent nuclear fuel, which consists primarily of very high atomic-weight (actinoid or "actinide") elements (e.g. uranium, plutonium, americium) along with smaller amounts of material composed of lighter atoms, notably the fission products produced by reactor operation.

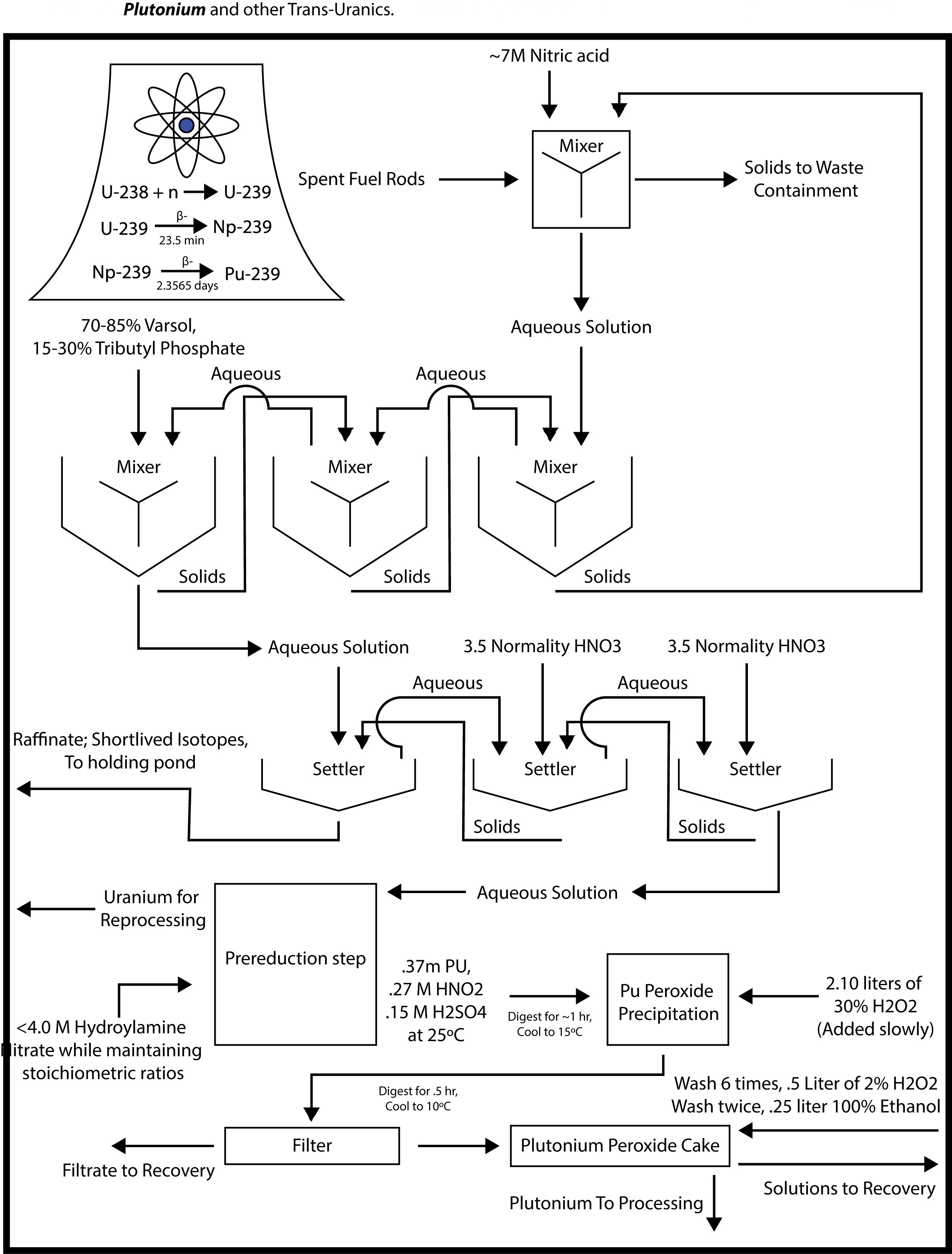
A simplified plutonium extraction flow chart.

The actinoid elements in this case consist primarily of the unconsumed remains of the original fuel (typically U-235, U-238, and/or Pu-239).

== Chemical process ==
Structure of uranyl nitrate complex that is extracted in PUREX.

The fuel is first dissolved in nitric acid at a concentration around 7 M. Solids are removed by filtration to avoid the formation of emulsions, referred to as third phases in the solvent extraction community.

The organic solvent consists of 30% tributyl phosphate (TBP) in a hydrocarbon such as kerosene. Uranyl(VI) UO^{2+}_{2} ions are extracted in the organic phase as UO_{2}(NO_{3})_{2}·2TBP complexes; plutonium is extracted as similar complexes. The heavier actinides, primarily americium and curium, and the fission products remain in the aqueous phase. The nature of uranyl nitrate complexes with trialkyl phosphates has been characterized.

Plutonium is separated from uranium by treating the TBP-kerosene solution with reducing agents to convert the plutonium to its +3 oxidation state, which will pass into the aqueous phase. Typical reducing agents include N,N-diethyl-hydroxylamine, ferrous sulfamate, and hydrazine. Uranium is then stripped from the kerosene solution by back-extraction into nitric acid at a concentration around 0.2 M.

== PUREX raffinate ==
The term PUREX raffinate describes the mixture of metals in nitric acid which are left behind when the uranium and plutonium have been removed by the PUREX process from a nuclear fuel dissolution liquor. This mixture is often known as high level nuclear waste.

Two PUREX raffinates exist. The most highly active raffinate from the first cycle is the one which is most commonly known as PUREX raffinate. The other is from the medium-active cycle in which the uranium and plutonium are refined by a second extraction with tributyl phosphate.

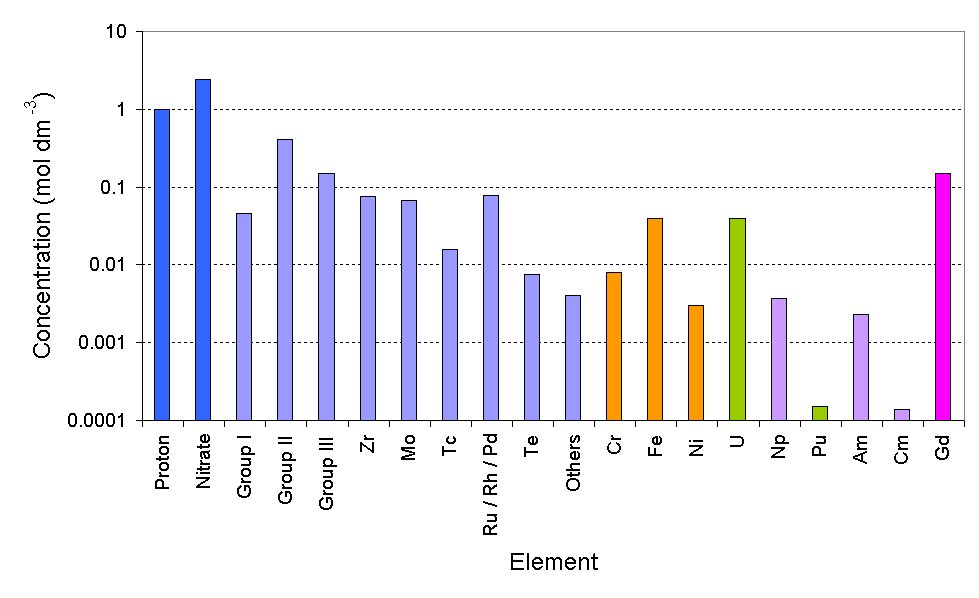

Deep blue is the bulk ions, light blue is the fission products (group I is Rb/Cs; group II is Sr/Ba; group III is Y and the lanthanides), orange is the corrosion products (from stainless steel pipework), green are the major actinides, violet are the minor actinides and magenta is the neutron poison.

Currently PUREX raffinate is stored in stainless steel tanks before being converted into glass. The first cycle PUREX raffinate is very radioactive. It has almost all of the fission products, corrosion products such as iron, nickel, traces of uranium, plutonium, and the minor actinides.

== Pollution ==
Waste from the commercial PUREX process include acidic aqueous raffinate with high levels of radioactive materials (HLLW) as well as high volumes of lower-level waste streams and degraded organic solvents. The PUREX plant at the Hanford Site was responsible for producing 'copious volumes of liquid wastes', resulting in the radioactive contamination of groundwater.

Greenpeace measurements in La Hague and Sellafield indicated that radioactive pollutants are steadily released into the sea, and the air. Therefore, people living near these processing plants are exposed to higher radiation levels than the naturally occurring background radiation. According to Greenpeace, this additional radiation is small but not negligible.

== History ==
The PUREX process was invented by Herbert H. Anderson and Larned B. Asprey at the Metallurgical Laboratory at the University of Chicago, as part of the Manhattan Project under Glenn T. Seaborg; their patent "Solvent Extraction Process for Plutonium" filed in 1947, mentions tributyl phosphate as the major reactant which accomplishes the bulk of the chemical extraction.

== List of nuclear reprocessing sites ==
- La Hague site
- Mayak
- Magnox Reprocessing Plant and Thermal Oxide Reprocessing Plant at Sellafield, both ended operation
- Tokaimura nuclear accidents
- West Valley Demonstration Project
- Savannah River Site
- Hanford Site
- Idaho Chemical Processing Plant, now Idaho National Laboratory
- Radiochemical Engineering Development Center, Oak Ridge National Laboratory

== See also ==
- Nuclear fuel cycle
- Breeder reactor
- Spent nuclear fuel shipping cask
- International Framework for Nuclear Energy Cooperation announced February, 2006
