= PRISM (reactor) =

Nuclear reactor design

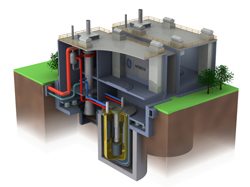
Drawing of the PRISM Reactor

PRISM (Power Reactor Innovative Small Module, sometimes S-PRISM from SuperPRISM) is a nuclear power plant design by GE Vernova Hitachi Nuclear Energy (GVH).

== Design ==
The S-PRISM represents GVH's Generation IV reactor solution to closing the nuclear fuel cycle and is also part of its Advanced Recycling Center (ARC) proposition to the U.S. Congress to deal with nuclear waste. S-PRISM is a commercial implementation of the Integral Fast Reactor developed by Argonne National Laboratory between 1984 and 1994.

It is a sodium-cooled fast breeder reactor, based on the Experimental Breeder Reactor II (EBR-II) design, scaled up by a factor of ten.

The design utilizes reactor modules, each having a power output of 311 MWe, to enable factory fabrication at low cost.

In an identical fashion to the EBR-II that it is based on, the reactor would transition to a much lower power level whenever temperatures rise significantly, moreover the reactor vessel modules are pool type, as opposed to loop type, with the pool conferring substantial thermal inertia and the final key safety feature includes a "RVACS", which is a passive reactor vessel air cooling system to remove decay heat. These safety systems are passive and therefore always operate and are to prevent core damage when no other means of heat removal are available.

As of 2022, the PRISM design is not under active consideration.

== History ==
=== Integral fast reactor ===
The integral fast reactor was developed at the West Campus of the Argonne National Laboratory in Idaho Falls, Idaho and was an extension (inc fuel reprocessing) to the Experimental Breeder Reactor II, which achieved first criticality in 1965 and ran for 30 years. The Integral Fast Reactor project (and EBR II) was shut down by the U.S. Congress in 1994. GE-Hitachi (GEH) continued work on the concept until 2001.

=== Possible US demonstration reactor ===
In October 2010, GEH signed a memorandum of understanding with the operators of the Department of Energy's (DOE) Savannah River site, which should allow the construction of a demonstration reactor prior to the design receiving full NRC licensing approval.

=== UK interest in PRISM - 2012 ===
In October 2011, The Independent reported that the UK Nuclear Decommissioning Authority (NDA) and senior advisers within the Department of Energy and Climate Change (DECC) had asked for technical and financial details of the PRISM, partly as a means of reducing the country's plutonium stockpile. In July 2012, GEH submitted a feasibility report to the NDA showing that the PRISM could provide a cost-effective way of quickly dealing with the UK's plutonium stockpile. The feasibility report includes an assessment from the consultancy firm DBD Limited suggesting there are "no fundamental impediment(s)" to the licensing of the PRISM in the UK. A 2012 Guardian article pointed out that a new generation of fast reactors such as the PRISM "could dispose of the waste problem, reducing the threat of radiation and nuclear proliferation, and at the same time generate vast amounts of low-carbon energy". David J. C. MacKay, chief scientist at the DECC, was quoted as saying that British plutonium contains enough energy to run the country's electricity grid for 500 years. Recent announcements of planned expansion of nuclear power in the UK have made no reference to PRISM.

=== Possible role in the Versatile Test Reactor program ===
In 2018 PRISM was selected by Battelle Energy Alliance to support the DOE decision making on the Versatile Test Reactor (VTR) program. In February 2019, DOE expected to complete the initial stage of deciding whether to proceed with the VTR within a few weeks. The VTR program was scrapped in 2022.

=== Evolution into Natrium ===
In 2020, GE Hitachi partnered with TerraPower to develop the Natrium reactor, which incorporates PRISM's 840 MWt pool-type sodium-cooled architecture. This design replaces waste recycling with a once-through HALEU metallic fuel system and adds a molten salt energy storage island.

== See also ==
- Small modular reactor
- Sodium-cooled fast reactor
