= Weapons-grade nuclear material =

Nuclear material pure enough to be used for nuclear weapons

Actinides and fission products by half-life
Actinides by decay chain				Half-life range (a)	Fission products of ^{235}U by yield
4n (Thorium)	4n + 1 (Neptunium)	4n + 2 (Radium)	4n + 3 (Actinium)	Half-life range (a)	4.5–7%	0.04–1.25%	<0.001%
^{228}Ra^{№}				4–6 a		^{155}Eu^{þ}
^{248}Bk				> 9 a
^{244}Cm^{ƒ}	^{241}Pu^{ƒ}	^{250}Cf	^{227}Ac^{№}	10–29 a	^{90}Sr	^{85}Kr	^{113m}Cd^{þ}
^{232}U^{ƒ}		^{238}Pu^{ƒ}	^{243}Cm^{ƒ}	29–97 a	^{137}Cs	^{151}Sm^{þ}	^{121m}Sn
	^{249}Cf^{ƒ}	^{242m}Am^{ƒ}		141–351 a	No fission products have a half-life in the range of 100 a–210 ka ...
	^{241}Am^{ƒ}		^{251}Cf^{ƒ}	430–900 a	No fission products have a half-life in the range of 100 a–210 ka ...
		^{226}Ra^{№}	^{247}Bk	1.3–1.6 ka	No fission products have a half-life in the range of 100 a–210 ka ...
^{240}Pu	^{229}Th	^{246}Cm^{ƒ}	^{243}Am^{ƒ}	4.7–7.4 ka	No fission products have a half-life in the range of 100 a–210 ka ...
	^{245}Cm^{ƒ}	^{250}Cm		8.3–8.5 ka	No fission products have a half-life in the range of 100 a–210 ka ...
			^{239}Pu^{ƒ}	24.1 ka	No fission products have a half-life in the range of 100 a–210 ka ...
		^{230}Th^{№}	^{231}Pa^{№}	32–76 ka	No fission products have a half-life in the range of 100 a–210 ka ...
^{236}Np^{ƒ}	^{233}U^{ƒ}	^{234}U^{№}		150–250 ka	^{99}Tc^{₡}	^{126}Sn
^{248}Cm		^{242}Pu		327–375 ka		^{79}Se^{₡}
				1.33 Ma	^{135}Cs^{₡}
	^{237}Np^{ƒ}			1.61–6.5 Ma	^{93}Zr	^{107}Pd
^{236}U			^{247}Cm^{ƒ}	15–24 Ma		^{129}I^{₡}
^{244}Pu				80 Ma	... nor beyond 15.7 Ma
^{232}Th^{№}		^{238}U^{№}	^{235}U^{ƒ№}	0.7–14.1 Ga	... nor beyond 15.7 Ma
₡, has thermal neutron capture cross section in the range of 8–50 barns; ƒ, fissile; №, primarily a naturally occurring radioactive material (NORM); þ, neutron poison (thermal neutron capture cross section greater than 3k barns)

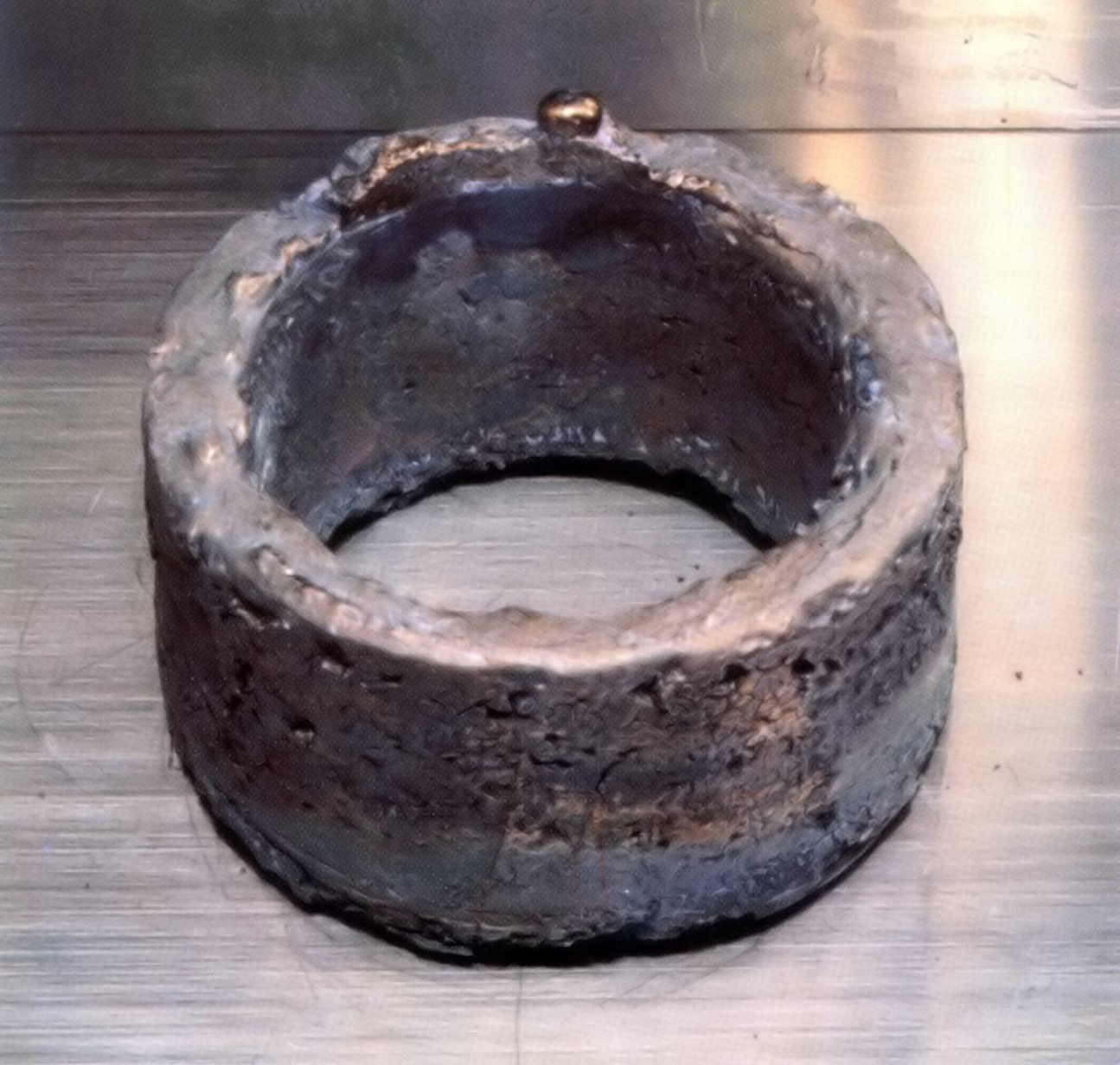
A weapons-grade ring of electrorefined plutonium, typical of the rings refined at Los Alamos and sent to Rocky Flats for fabrication. The ring has a purity of 99.96%, weighs 5.3 kg, and is approx 11 cm in diameter. It is enough plutonium for one bomb core. The ring shape helps with criticality safety (less concentrated material).

Weapons-grade nuclear material is any fissionable nuclear material that is pure enough to make a nuclear weapon and has properties that make it particularly suitable for nuclear weapons use. Plutonium and uranium in grades normally used in nuclear weapons are the most common examples. (These nuclear materials have other categorizations based on their purity.)

Only fissile isotopes of certain elements have the potential for use in nuclear weapons. For such use, the concentration of fissile isotopes uranium-235 and plutonium-239 in the element used must be sufficiently high. Uranium from natural sources is enriched by isotope separation, and plutonium is produced in a suitable nuclear reactor.

Experiments have been conducted with uranium-233 (the fissile material at the heart of the thorium fuel cycle). Neptunium-237 and some isotopes of americium might be usable, but it is not clear that this has ever been implemented. The latter substances are part of the minor actinides in spent nuclear fuel.

== Critical mass ==
Any weapons-grade nuclear material must have a critical mass that is small enough to justify its use in a weapon. The critical mass for any material is the smallest amount needed for a sustained nuclear chain reaction. Moreover, different isotopes have different critical masses, and the critical mass for many radioactive isotopes is infinite, because the mode of decay of one atom cannot induce similar decay of more than one neighboring atom. For example, the critical mass of uranium-238 is infinite, while the critical masses of uranium-233 and uranium-235 are finite.

The critical mass for any isotope is influenced by any impurities and the physical shape of the material. The shape with minimal critical mass and the smallest physical dimensions is a sphere. Bare-sphere critical masses at normal density of some actinides are listed in the accompanying table. Most information on bare sphere masses is classified, but some documents have been declassified.

Nuclide	Half-life (y)	Critical mass (kg)	Diameter (cm)	Ref
uranium-232	68.9	3.7	7.2	
uranium-233	159,200	15	11	
uranium-235	704,000,000	52	17	
neptunium-236	153,000	7	8.7	
neptunium-237	2,144,000	60	18	
plutonium-238	87.7	9.04–10.07	9.5–9.9	
plutonium-239	24,110	10	9.9	
plutonium-240	6561	40	15	
plutonium-241	14.33	12	10.5	
plutonium-242	375,000	75–100	19–21	
americium-241	432.6	55–77	20–23	
americium-242m	141	9–14	11–13	
americium-243	7350	180–280	30–35	
curium-243	29.1	7.34–10	10–11	
curium-244	18.11	13.5–30	12.4–16	
curium-245	8250	9.41–12.3	11–12	
curium-246	4700	39–70.1	18–21	
curium-247	15,600,000	6.94–7.06	9.9	
berkelium-247	1380	75.7	11.8-12.2	
berkelium-249	0.896	192	16.1-16.6	
californium-249	351	6	9	
californium-251	900	5.46	8.5	
californium-252	2.645	2.73	6.9	
einsteinium-254	0.755	9.89	7.1	

== Countries that have produced weapons-grade nuclear material ==
At least ten countries have produced weapons-grade nuclear material:

- Five recognized "nuclear-weapon states" under the terms of the Nuclear Non-Proliferation Treaty (NPT): the United States (first nuclear weapon tested and two bombs used as weapons in 1945), Russia (first weapon tested in 1949), the United Kingdom (1952), France (1960), and China (1964)
- Three other declared nuclear states that are not signatories of the NPT: India (not a signatory, weapon tested in 1974), Pakistan (not a signatory, weapon tested in 1998), and North Korea (withdrew from the NPT in 2003, weapon tested in 2006)
- Israel, which is widely known to have developed nuclear weapons (likely first tested in the 1960s or 1970s) but has not openly declared its capability
- South Africa, which also had enrichment capabilities and developed nuclear weapons (possibly tested in 1979), but disassembled its arsenal and joined the NPT in 1991

== Weapons-grade uranium ==
Natural uranium is made weapons-grade through isotopic enrichment. Initially only about 0.7% of it is fissile U-235, with the rest being almost entirely uranium-238 (U-238). They are separated by their differing masses. Highly enriched uranium is considered weapons-grade when it has been enriched to about 90% U-235.

U-233 is produced from thorium-232 by neutron capture. The U-233 produced thus does not require enrichment and can be relatively easily chemically separated from residual Th-232. It is therefore regulated as a special nuclear material only by the total amount present. U-233 may be intentionally down-blended with U-238 to remove proliferation concerns.

While U-233 would thus seem ideal for weaponization, a significant obstacle to that goal is the co-production of trace amounts of uranium-232 due to side-reactions. U-232 hazards, a result of its highly radioactive decay products such as thallium-208, are significant even at 5 parts per million. Implosion nuclear weapons require U-232 levels below 50 PPM (above which the U-233 is considered "low grade"; cf. "Standard weapon grade plutonium requires a Pu-240 content of no more than 6.5%." which is 65,000 PPM, and the analogous Pu-238 was produced in levels of 0.5% (5000 PPM) or less). Gun-type fission weapons would require low U-232 levels and low levels of light impurities on the order of 1 PPM.

== Weapons-grade plutonium ==
Pu-239 is produced artificially in nuclear reactors when a neutron is absorbed by U-238, forming U-239, which then decays in a rapid two-step process into Pu-239. It can then be separated from the uranium in a nuclear reprocessing plant.

Weapons-grade plutonium is defined as being predominantly Pu-239, typically about 93% Pu-239. Pu-240 is produced when Pu-239 absorbs an additional neutron and fails to fission. Pu-240 and Pu-239 are not separated by reprocessing. Pu-240 has a high rate of spontaneous fission, which can cause a nuclear weapon to pre-detonate, producing a fizzle. This makes plutonium unsuitable for use in gun-type nuclear weapons. To reduce the concentration of Pu-240 in the plutonium produced, weapons program plutonium production reactors (e.g. B Reactor) irradiate the uranium for a far shorter time than is normal for a nuclear power reactor. More precisely, weapons-grade plutonium is obtained from uranium irradiated to a low burnup.

This represents a fundamental difference between these two types of reactor. In a nuclear power station, high burnup is desirable. Power stations such as the obsolete British Magnox and French UNGG reactors, which were designed to produce either electricity or weapons material, were operated at low power levels with frequent fuel changes using online refuelling to produce weapons-grade plutonium. Such operation is not possible with the light water reactors most commonly used to produce electric power. In these the reactor must be shut down and the pressure vessel disassembled to gain access to the irradiated fuel.

Plutonium recovered from LWR spent fuel, while not weapons grade, can be used to produce nuclear weapons at all levels of sophistication, though in simple designs it may produce only a fizzle yield. Weapons made with reactor-grade plutonium would require special cooling to keep them in storage and ready for use. A 1962 test at the U.S. Nevada National Security Site (then known as the Nevada Proving Grounds) used non-weapons-grade plutonium produced in a Magnox reactor in the United Kingdom. The plutonium used was provided to the United States under the 1958 US–UK Mutual Defence Agreement. Its isotopic composition has not been disclosed, other than the description reactor grade, and it has not been disclosed which definition was used in describing the material this way. The plutonium was apparently sourced from the Magnox reactors at Calder Hall or Chapelcross. The content of Pu-239 in material used for the 1962 test was not disclosed, but has been inferred to have been at least 85%, much higher than typical spent fuel from currently operating reactors.

Occasionally, low-burnup spent fuel has been produced by a commercial LWR when an incident such as a fuel cladding failure has required early refuelling. If the period of irradiation has been sufficiently short, this spent fuel could be reprocessed to produce weapons grade plutonium.
