= Plutonium-240 =

Isotope of plutonium

General
- Symbol: ^{240}Pu
- Names: plutonium-240
- Protons (Z): 94
- Neutrons (N): 146

Nuclide data
- Natural abundance: Trace
- Half-life (t_{1/2}): 6561(7) years
- Isotope mass: 240.053812 Da
- Decay products: ^{236}U

Decay modes
- Decay mode: Decay energy (MeV)
- Alpha decay: 5.256

Plutonium-240 (^{240}Pu or Pu-240) is an isotope of plutonium formed when plutonium-239 captures a neutron without undergoing fission. The detection of its spontaneous fission led to its discovery in 1944 at Los Alamos and had important consequences for the Manhattan Project.

As with the other major plutonium isotopes, the normal decay leads to a more-stable isotope of uranium (^{236}U) and in effect no further decay chain on human timescales. Over geologic time it would follow the thorium series.

^{240}Pu undergoes spontaneous fission as a secondary decay mode at a small but significant rate. The presence of ^{240}Pu limits plutonium's use in a nuclear bomb, because the neutron flux from spontaneous fission initiates the chain reaction prematurely, causing an early release of energy that physically disperses the core before full implosion is reached (a "fizzle").

== Nuclear properties ==
About 62% to 73% of the time when ^{239}Pu captures a neutron, it undergoes fission; the remainder of the time, it forms ^{240}Pu. The longer a nuclear fuel element remains in a nuclear reactor, the greater the relative percentage of ^{240}Pu in the fuel becomes.

The isotope ^{240}Pu has about the same thermal neutron capture cross section as ^{239}Pu (289.5±1.4 vs. 269.3±2.9 barns), but only a tiny thermal neutron fission cross section (0.064 barns). When the isotope ^{240}Pu captures a neutron, it is about 4500 times more likely to become plutonium-241 than to fission. In general, isotopes of odd mass numbers are more likely to absorb a neutron, and can undergo fission upon neutron absorption more easily than isotopes of even mass number. Thus, even mass isotopes tend to accumulate, especially in a thermal reactor.

== Nuclear weapons ==
The inevitable presence of some ^{240}Pu in a plutonium-based nuclear warhead core complicates its design, and pure ^{239}Pu is considered optimal. This is for a few reasons:

- ^{240}Pu has a high rate of spontaneous fission. A single stray neutron that is introduced while the core is supercritical will cause it to detonate almost immediately, even before it has been crushed to an optimal configuration. The presence of ^{240}Pu would thus randomly cause fizzles, with an explosive yield well below the potential yield.
- Isotopes besides ^{239}Pu release significantly more radiation, which complicates its handling by workers.
- Isotopes besides ^{239}Pu produce more decay heat, which can cause phase change distortions of the precision core if allowed to build up.

The spontaneous fission problem was extensively studied by the scientists of the Manhattan Project during World War II. It blocked the use of plutonium in gun-type nuclear weapons in which the assembly of fissile material into its optimal supercritical mass configuration can take up to a millisecond to complete, and made it necessary to develop implosion-style weapons where the assembly occurs in a few microseconds. Even with this design, it was estimated in advance of the Trinity test that ^{240}Pu impurity would cause a 12% chance of the explosion failing to reach its maximum yield.

The minimization of the amount of ^{240}Pu, as in weapons-grade plutonium (less than 7% ^{240}Pu) is achieved by reprocessing the fuel after just 90 days of use. Such rapid fuel cycles are highly impractical for civilian power reactors and are normally only carried out with dedicated weapons plutonium production reactors. Plutonium from spent civilian power reactor fuel typically has under 70% ^{239}Pu and around 26% ^{240}Pu, the rest being made up of other plutonium isotopes (the short-lived 238 and 241 are problematic with respect to handling, storage, and decay heat), making it more difficult to use it for the manufacturing of nuclear weapons. For nuclear weapon designs introduced after the 1940s, however, there has been considerable debate over the degree to which ^{240}Pu poses a barrier for weapons construction; see the article Reactor-grade plutonium.

== See also ==
- Burnup
- Isotopes of plutonium

Lighter: plutonium-239	Plutonium-240 is an isotope of plutonium	Heavier: plutonium-241
Decay product of: curium-244 (α) neptunium-240 (β^{−})	Decay chain of plutonium-240	Decays to: uranium-236 (α)
