= Activation product =

Materials made radioactive by neutron activation

An activation product is a material that has been made radioactive by the process of neutron activation.

== Process ==
Fission products and actinides produced by neutron absorption of nuclear fuel itself are normally referred to by those specific names, and activation product reserved for products of neutron capture by other materials, such as structural components of the nuclear reactor or nuclear bomb, the reactor coolant, control rods or other neutron poisons, or materials in the environment. In these cases their production is undesired and they need to be handled as radioactive waste. Some nuclides can be produced both as activation products or as fission products. For example molybdenum-99 which is an important nuclide in "molybdenum cows" used in medical diagnostics can be produced either by fissioning ^{235}U or by neutron irradiation of ^{98}Mo.

== Practical uses ==
However, neutron activation (usually in a dedicated research reactor, but sometimes also in power reactors like the CANDUs at Bruce nuclear generating station) is also used deliberately to produce desired radioisotopes for uses in food irradiation, nuclear medicine and to sterilize equipment via gamma radiation emitted from isotopes such as Cobalt-60.

Activation products in a reactor's primary coolant loop are a main reason reactors use a chain of two or even three coolant loops linked by heat exchangers.

Fusion reactors will not produce radioactive waste from the fusion product nuclei themselves, which are normally just helium-4, but generate high neutron fluxes, so activation products are a particular concern.

== List of activation products ==
Activation product radionuclides include:

Half-lives and decay branching fractions for activation products
Nuclide	Half-life	Decay mode	branching fraction	Source	Notes
^{3}_{1}H	12.312 ± 0.025 y	β^{−}	1.0	LNHB	
^{10}_{4}Be	( 1.51 ± 0.06 ) × 10^{6} y	β^{−}	1.0	ENSDF	
^{14}_{6}C	( 5.7 ± 0.03 ) × 10^{3} y	β^{−}	1.0	LNHB	
^{15}_{6}C	2.449 ± 0.005 s	β^{−}	1.0	ENSDF	
^{16}_{7}N	7.13 ± 0.02 s	β^{−}	1.0	ENSDF	
^{19}_{8}O	26.88 ± 0.05 s	β^{−}	1.0	ENSDF	
^{22}_{11}Na	950.57 ± 0.23 d	ε	0.1011 ± 0.0002a	IAEA-CRP-XG	[1]
^{22}_{11}Na	950.57 ± 0.23 d	β^{+}	0.8989 ± 0.0002a	IAEA-CRP-XG	[1]
^{24}_{11}Na	0.62329 ± 0.00006 d	β^{−}	1.0	IAEA-CRP-XG	
^{27}_{12}Mg	9.458 ± 0.012 m	β^{−}	1.0	ENSDF	
^{26}_{13}Al	( 7.17 ± 0.24 ) × 10^{5} y	ε	0.1825 ± 0.0023b	LNHB	[2]
^{26}_{13}Al	( 7.17 ± 0.24 ) × 10^{5} y	β^{+}	0.8175 ± 0.0023b	LNHB	[2]
^{35}_{16}S	87.32 ± 0.16 d	β^{−}	1.0	LNHB	
^{36}_{17}Cl	( 0.01 ± 0.03 ) × 10^{5} y	ε	0.019 ± 0.001	LNHB	
^{36}_{17}Cl	( 0.01 ± 0.03 ) × 10^{5} y	β^{−}	0.981 ± 0.001	LNHB	
^{39}_{18}Ar	269 ± 3 y	β^{−}	1.0	ENSDF	
^{41}_{18}Ar	109.61 ± 0.04 m	β^{−}	1.0	ENSDF	
^{40}_{19}K	( 4.563 ± 0.013 ) × 10^{11} d	ε	0.1086 ± 0.0013a	IAEA-CRP-XG	[1]
^{40}_{19}K	( 4.563 ± 0.013 ) × 10^{11} d	β^{−}	0.8914 ± 0.0013a	IAEA-CRP-XG	[1]
^{42}_{19}K	12.36 ± 0.012 h	β^{−}	1.0	ENSDF	
^{41}_{20}Ca	( 1.02 ± 0.07 ) × 10^{5} y	ε	1.0	ENSDF	
^{45}_{20}Ca	162.61 ± 0.09 d	β^{−}	1.0	ENSDF	
^{47}_{21}Sc	3.3492 ± 0.0006 d	β^{−}	1.0	ENSDF	
^{48}_{21}Sc	43.67 ± 0.09 h	β^{−}	1.0	ENSDF	
^{51}_{24}Cr	27.7009 ± 0.002 d	ε	1.0	IAEA-CRP-XG	
^{54}_{25}Mn	312.29 ± 0.26 d	ε	1.0	IAEA-CRP-XG	
^{56}_{25}Mn	0.107449 ± 0.000019 d	β^{−}	1.0	IAEA-CRP-XG	
^{55}_{26}Fe	( 1.0027 ± 0.0023 ) × 10^{3} d	ε	1.0	IAEA-CRP-XG	
^{59}_{26}Fe	44.494 ± 0.013 d	β^{−}	1.0	IAEA-CRP-XG	
^{57}_{27}Co	271.8 ± 0.05 d	ε	1.0	IAEA-CRP-XG	
^{58}_{27}Co	70.86 ± 0.06 d	β^{+}	0.15 ± 0.0020a	IAEA-CRP-XG	[1]
^{58}_{27}Co	70.86 ± 0.06 d	ε	0.85 ± 0.0020a	IAEA-CRP-XG	[1]
^{60}_{27}Co	( 1.92523 ± 0.00027 ) × 10^{3} d	β^{−}	1.0	IAEA-CRP-XG	
^{59}_{28}Ni	( 7.6 ± 0.5 ) × 10^{4} y	ε	1.0	ENSDF	
^{63}_{28}Ni	98.7 ± 2.4 y	β^{−}	1.0	LNHB	
^{65}_{28}Ni	2.51719 ± 0.00026 h	β^{−}	1.0	ENSDF	
^{64}_{29}Cu	0.52929 ± 0.00018 d	β^{+}	0.179 ± 0.002a	IAEA-CRP-XG	[1]
^{64}_{29}Cu	0.52929 ± 0.00018 d	β^{−}	0.39 ± 0.003a	IAEA-CRP-XG	[1]
^{64}_{29}Cu	0.52929 ± 0.00018 d	ε	0.431 ± 0.005a	IAEA-CRP-XG	[1]
^{66}_{29}Cu	5.12 ± 0.014 m	β^{−}	1.0	ENSDF	
^{65}_{30}Zn	243.86 ± 0.2 d	β^{+}	0.0142 ± 0.0001a	IAEA-CRP-XG	[1]
^{65}_{30}Zn	243.86 ± 0.2 d	ε	0.9858 ± 0.0001a	IAEA-CRP-XG	[1]
^{93m}_{41}Nb	( 5.73 ± 0.22 ) × 10^{3} d	IT	1.0	IAEA-CRP-XG	
^{93}_{42}Mo	( 4.0 ± 0.8 ) × 10^{3} y	ε	1.0	ENSDF	
^{99m}_{43}Tc	0.250281 ± 0.000022 d	β^{−}	0.000037 ± 0.000006a	IAEA-CRP-XG	[1]
^{99m}_{43}Tc	0.250281 ± 0.000022 d	IT	0.999963 ± 0.000006a	IAEA-CRP-XG	[1]
^{110m}_{47}Ag	249.85 ± 0.1 d	IT	0.0136 ± 0.0008a	IAEA-CRP-XG	[1]
^{110m}_{47}Ag	249.85 ± 0.1 d	β^{−}	0.9864 ± 0.0008a	IAEA-CRP-XG	[1]
^{115m}_{49}In	4.486 ± 0.004 h	β^{−}	0.05 ± 0.008	ENSDF	
^{115m}_{49}In	4.486 ± 0.004 h	IT	0.95 ± 0.008	ENSDF	
^{126}_{53}I	12.93 ± 0.05 d	β^{−}	0.473 ± 0.006	ENSDF	
^{126}_{53}I	12.93 ± 0.05 d	ε	0.527 ± 0.006	ENSDF	
^{175}_{72}Hf	70 ± 2 d	ε	1.0	ENSDF	
^{181}_{72}Hf	42.39 ± 0.06 d	β^{−}	1.0	ENSDF	
^{182}_{73}Ta	114.43 ± 0.04 d	β^{−}	1.0	ENSDF	
^{181}_{74}W	121.2 ± 0.2 d	ε	1.0	ENSDF	
^{185}_{74}W	75.1 ± 0.3 d	β^{−}	1.0	ENSDF	
^{187}_{74}W	23.72 ± 0.06 h	β^{−}	1.0	ENSDF	
^{198}_{79}Au	2.695 ± 0.0007 d	β^{−}	1.0	IAEA-CRP-XG	
^{197}_{80}Hg	64.14 ± 0.05 h	ε	1.0	ENSDF	
^{203}_{80}Hg	46.594 ± 0.012 d	β^{−}	1.0	IAEA-CRP-XG	

LNHB	Laboratoire National Henri Becquerel, Recommended Data, http://www.nucleide.org/DDEP_WG/DDEPdata.htm, 5 June 2008.
IAEA-CRP-XG	M.-M. Bé, V.P. Chechev, R. Dersch, O.A.M. Helene, R.G. Helmer, M. Herman, S. Hlav ác, A. Marcinkowski, G.L. Molnár, A.L. Nichols, E. Schönfeld, V.R. Vanin, M.J. Woods, IAEA CRP "Update of X Ray and Gamma Ray Decay Data Standards for Detector Calibration and Other Applications", IAEA Scientific and Technical Information report STI/PUB/1287, May 2007, International Atomic Energy Agency, Vienna, Austria, ISBN 92-0-113606-4.
ENSDF	Evaluated Nuclear Structure Data File, http://www-nds.iaea.org/ensdf/, 5 June 2008.

[1] Branching fractions from LNHB database.

[2] Branching fractions renormalised to sum to 1.0..
