= Experimental Breeder Reactor II =

Decommissioned experimental nuclear reactor in Idaho, USA

Coordinates: 43.595039°N 112.657156°W

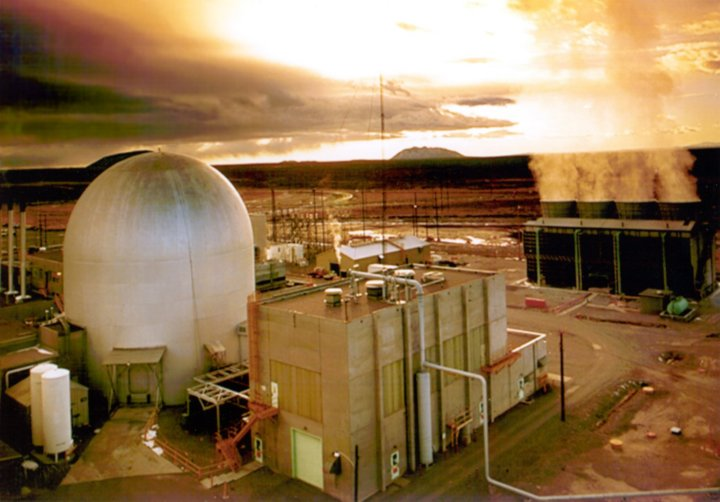
The Experimental Breeder Reactor II

Experimental Breeder Reactor-II (EBR-II) was a sodium-cooled fast reactor designed, built and operated by Argonne National Laboratory at the National Reactor Testing Station in Idaho. It was shut down in 1994. Custody of the reactor was transferred to Idaho National Laboratory after its founding in 2005.

Initial operations began in July 1964 and it achieved criticality in 1965 at a total cost of more than US$32 million ($327 million in 2025 dollars). The original emphasis in the design and operation of EBR-II was to demonstrate a complete breeder-reactor power plant with on-site reprocessing of solid metallic fuel. Fuel elements enriched to about 67% uranium-235 were sealed in stainless steel tubes and removed when they reached about 65% enrichment. The tubes were unsealed and reprocessed to remove neutron poisons, mixed with fresh U-235 to increase enrichment, and placed back in the reactor.

Testing of the original breeder cycle ran until 1969, after which time the reactor was used to test concepts for the Integral Fast Reactor (IFR) concept. In this role, the high-energy neutron environment of the EBR-II core was used for testing fuels and materials for future, larger, liquid metal reactors. As part of these experiments, in 1986 EBR-II underwent an experimental shutdown simulating complete cooling pump failure. It demonstrated its ability to self-cool its fuel through natural convection of the sodium coolant during the decay heat period following the shutdown. It was used in the IFR support role, and many other experiments, until it was decommissioned in September 1994.

At full power operation, which it reached in September 1969, EBR-II produced about 62.5 megawatts of heat and 20 megawatts of electricity through a conventional three-loop steam turbine system and tertiary forced-air cooling tower. Over its lifetime it has generated over two billion kilowatt-hours of electricity, providing a majority of the electricity and also heat to the facilities of the Argonne National Laboratory-West.

== Design ==
The fuel consists of uranium rods 5 millimetres (0.20 in) in diameter and 33 cm (13 in) long. Enriched to 67% uranium-235 when fresh, the concentration dropped to approximately 65% upon removal. The rods also contained 10% zirconium. Each fuel element is placed inside a thin-walled stainless steel tube along with a small amount of sodium metal. The tube is welded shut at the top to form a unit 73 cm (29 in) long. The purpose of the sodium is to function as a heat-transfer agent. As more and more of the uranium undergoes fission, it develops fissures and the sodium enters the voids. It extracts an important fission product, caesium-137, and hence becomes intensely radioactive. The void above the uranium collects fission gases, mainly krypton-85. Clusters of the pins inside hexagonal stainless steel jackets 234 cm (92 in) long are assembled honeycomb-like; each unit has about 4.5 kg (9.9 lb) of uranium. Altogether, the core contains about 308 kg (679 lb) of uranium fuel, and this part is called the driver.

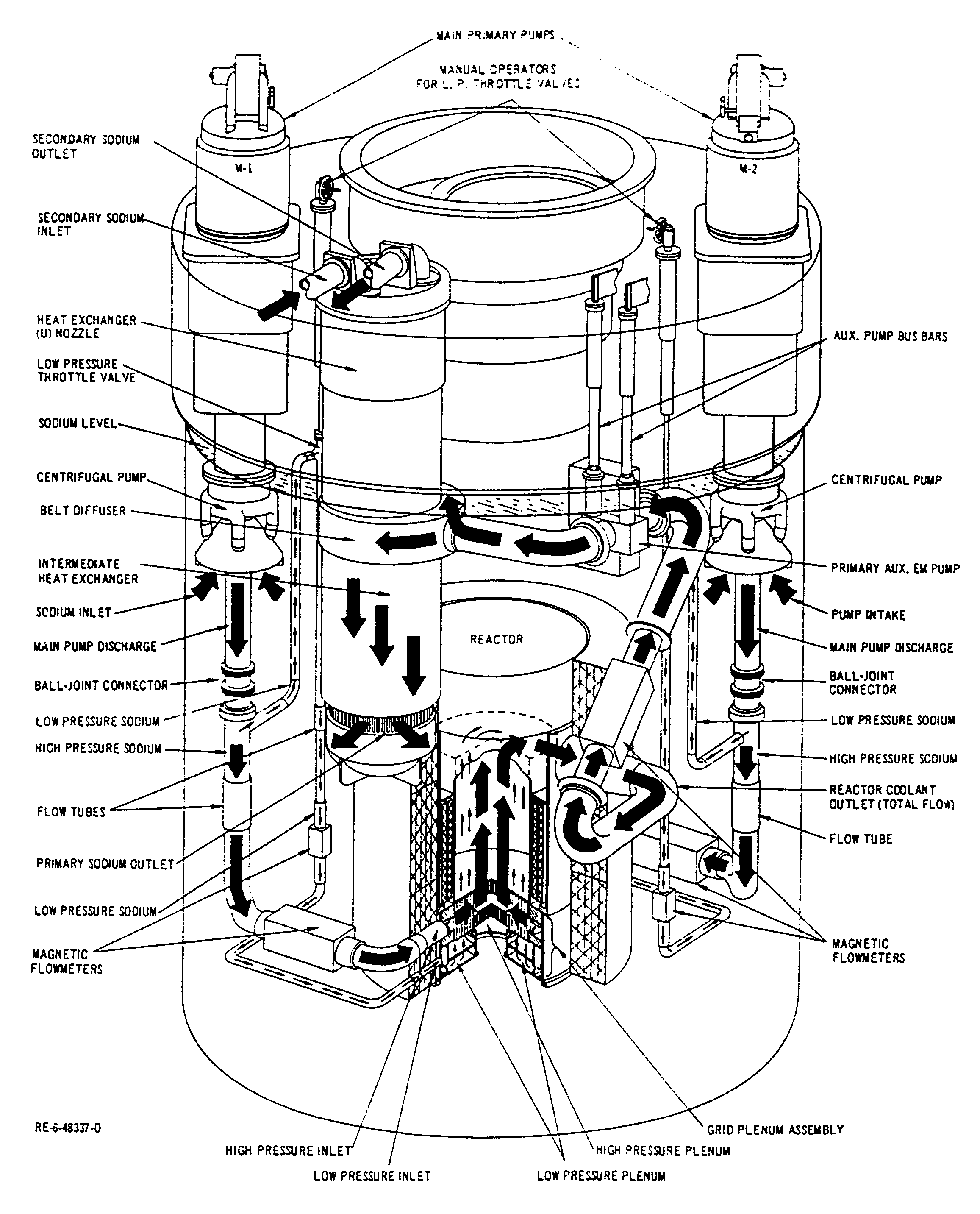
Drawing of the reactor vessel of the EBR-II

The EBR-II core can accommodate as many as 65 experimental sub-assemblies for irradiation and operational reliability tests, fueled with a variety of metallic and ceramic fuels—the oxides, carbides, or nitrides of uranium and plutonium, and metallic fuel alloys such as uranium-plutonium-zirconium fuel. Other sub-assembly positions may contain structural-material experiments.

== Passive safety ==
The pool-type reactor design of the EBR-II provides passive safety: the reactor core, its fuel handling equipment, and many other systems of the reactor are submerged under molten sodium. By providing a fluid which readily conducts heat from the fuel to the coolant, and which operates at relatively low temperatures, the EBR-II takes maximum advantage of expansion of the coolant, fuel, and structure during off-normal events which increase temperatures. The expansion of the fuel and structure in an off-normal situation causes the system to shut down even without human operator intervention. In April 1986, two special tests were performed on the EBR-II, in which the main primary cooling pumps were shut off with the reactor at full power (62.5 megawatts, thermal). By not allowing the normal shutdown systems to interfere, the reactor power dropped to near zero within about 300 seconds. No damage to the fuel or the reactor resulted. The same day, this demonstration was followed by another important test. With the reactor again at full power, flow in the secondary cooling system was stopped. This test caused the temperature to increase, since there was nowhere for the reactor heat to go. As the primary (reactor) cooling system became hotter, the fuel, sodium coolant, and structure expanded, and the reactor shut down. This test showed that it will shut down using inherent features such as thermal expansion, even if the ability to remove heat from the primary cooling system is lost.

EBR-II is now defueled. The EBR-II shutdown activity also includes the treatment of its discharged spent fuel using an electrometallurgical fuel treatment process in the Fuel Conditioning Facility located next to the EBR-II.

The clean-up process for EBR-II includes the removal and processing of the sodium coolant, cleaning of the EBR-II sodium systems, removal and passivating of other chemical hazards and placing the deactivated components and structure in a safe condition.

== Decommissioning ==
The reactor was shut down in September 1994. The initial phase of decommissioning activities, reactor de-fueling, was completed in December 1996. From 2000, the coolants were removed and processed. This was completed in March 2001. The third and final phase of the decommissioning activity was "the placement of the reactor and non-reactor systems in a radiological and industrially safe condition".

Between 2012 and 2015, some components of the below-ground reactor were removed. The cost for removal actions in the reactor building were about $25.7 million. The basement with the reactor was filled with grout. The three-year decontamination and entombment project cost $730 million. In a later stage, the large concrete dome that surrounds the EBR-II reactor would be removed and a concrete cap placed over the remaining structure.

In 2018, the plans were changed. The removal of the dome was stopped and in 2019, a new floor was poured and the dome got a fresh paint to prepare the building for industrial use. The building will be used for a research facility on top of the entombed reactor. The dome is an integral part of the tomb along with a "Site-Wide Long-Term Management and Control Program". The use of the site will be industrial in nature for a 100-year period and likely in the indefinite future thereafter.

== Related facilities ==
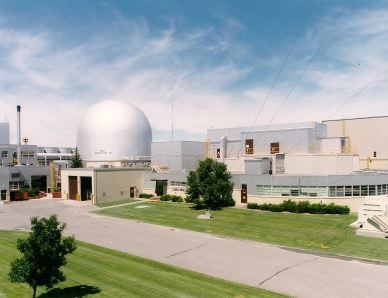
The EBR-II and the Fuel Conditioning Facility

The objective of the EBR-II was to demonstrate the operation of a sodium-cooled fast reactor power plant with on-site reprocessing of metallic fuel. In order to meet this objective of on-site reprocessing, the EBR-II was part of a wider complex of facilities, consisting of

- Fuel Conditioning Facility: facility for reprocessing and treating spent fuel from the EBR-II and other reactors, using an electrorefiner for electrometallurgical treatment of spent fuel
- Fuel Manufacturing Facility: facility for the manufacturing of metallic fuel elements
- Hot Fuels Examination Facility: a "hot-cell" complex for handling and examining highly radioactive materials remotely
- Sodium Processing Facility: facility for processing of reactive sodium into low-level waste

== Integral Fast Reactor ==
The EBR-II has served as prototype of the Integral Fast Reactor (IFR), which was the intended successor to the EBR-II. The IFR program was started in 1983, but funding was withdrawn by U.S. Congress in 1994, three years before the intended completion of the program.

== Gallery ==
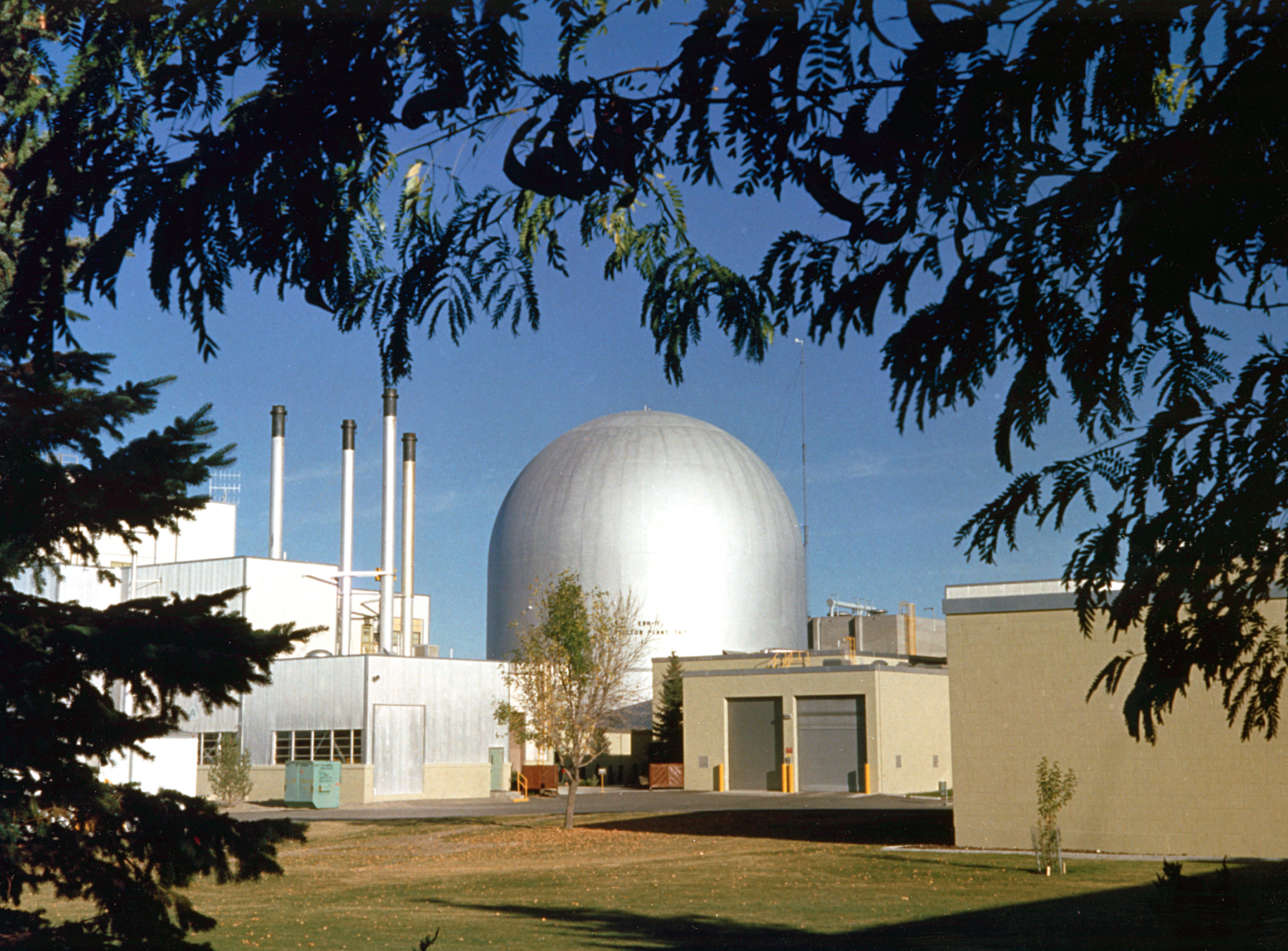
EBR-II

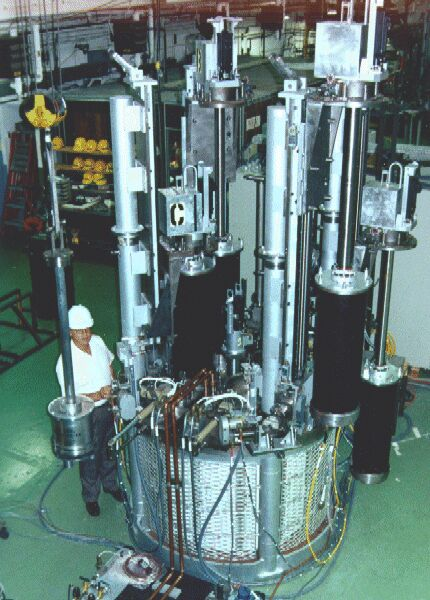
Electrorefiner

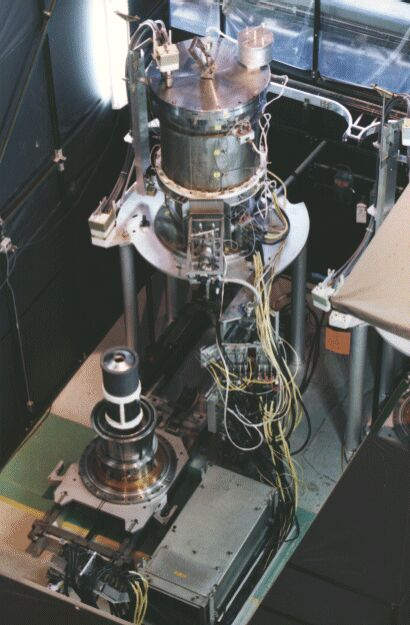
Cathode processor

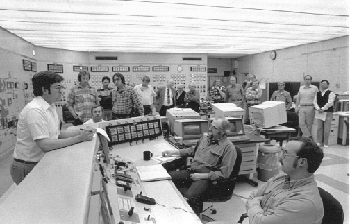
Control room of the EBR-II in 1986

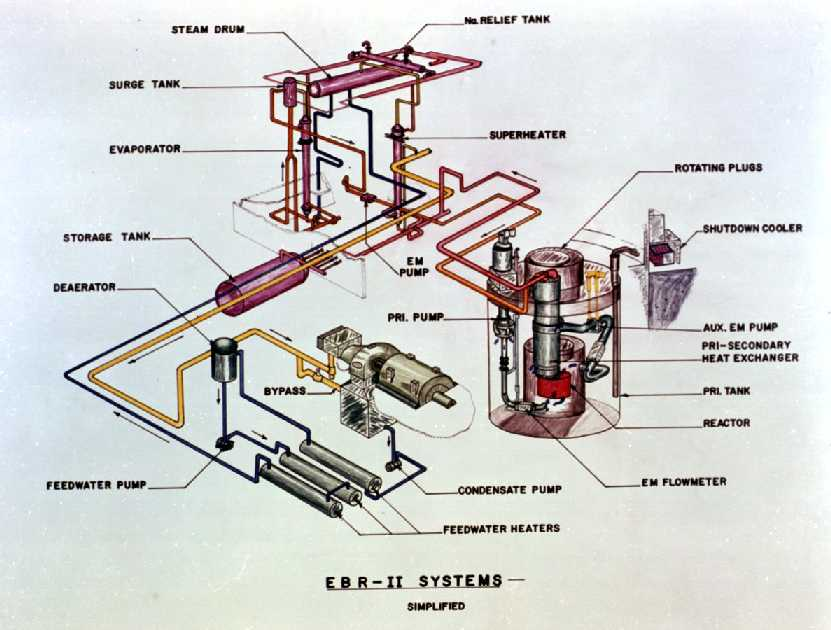
Schema of the EBR-II

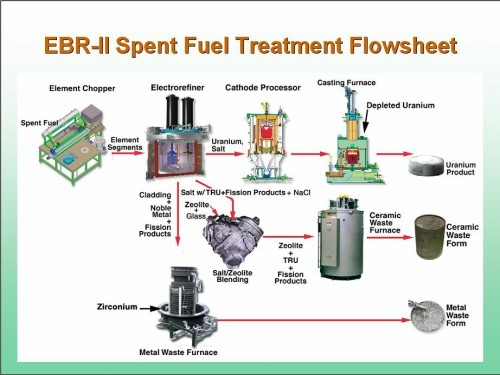
Schema of the spent fuel treatment process

== See also ==
- EBR-I
