= Waste valorization =

Concept in economics

Waste valorization, beneficial reuse, value recovery or waste reclamation is the process of waste products or residues from an economic process being valorized (given economic value), by reuse or recycling in order to create economically useful materials. The term comes from practices in sustainable manufacturing and economics, industrial ecology and waste management. The term is usually applied in industrial processes where residue from creating or processing one good is used as a raw material or energy feedstock for another industrial process. Industrial wastes in particular are good candidates for valorization because they tend to be more consistent and predictable than other waste, such as household waste.

Increased regulation of residual materials and socioeconomic changes, such as the introduction of ideas about sustainable development and circular economy in the 1990s and 2000s increased focus on industrial practices to recover resources as value add materials.

== Biomass ==
=== Crop residue ===
Crop residue, such as corncob, and other residues from the food processing industry, such as residues from biorefineries, have high potential for use in further processes, such as producing biofuel, bioplastics, and other biomaterials for industrial processes.

=== Food waste ===
One of the more fruitful fields of work is food waste—when deposited in landfills, food waste produces the greenhouse gas methane and other toxic compounds that can be dangerous to humans and local ecosystems. Landfill gas utilization and municipal composting can capture and use the organic nutrients. Food waste collected from non-industrial sources is harder to use, because it often has much greater diversity than other sources of waste—different locations and different windows of time produce very different compositions of material, making it hard to use for industrial processes.

Transforming food waste into either food products, feed products, or converting it to or extracting food or feed ingredients is termed food waste valorisation. Valorisation of food waste offers an economical and environmental opportunity, which can reduce the problems of its conventional disposal. Food wastes have been demonstrated to be valuable bioresources that can be utilised to obtain a number of useful products, including biofertilizers, bioplastics, biofuels, chemicals, and nutraceuticals. There is much potential to recycle food wastes by conversion to insect protein.

=== Human excreta ===
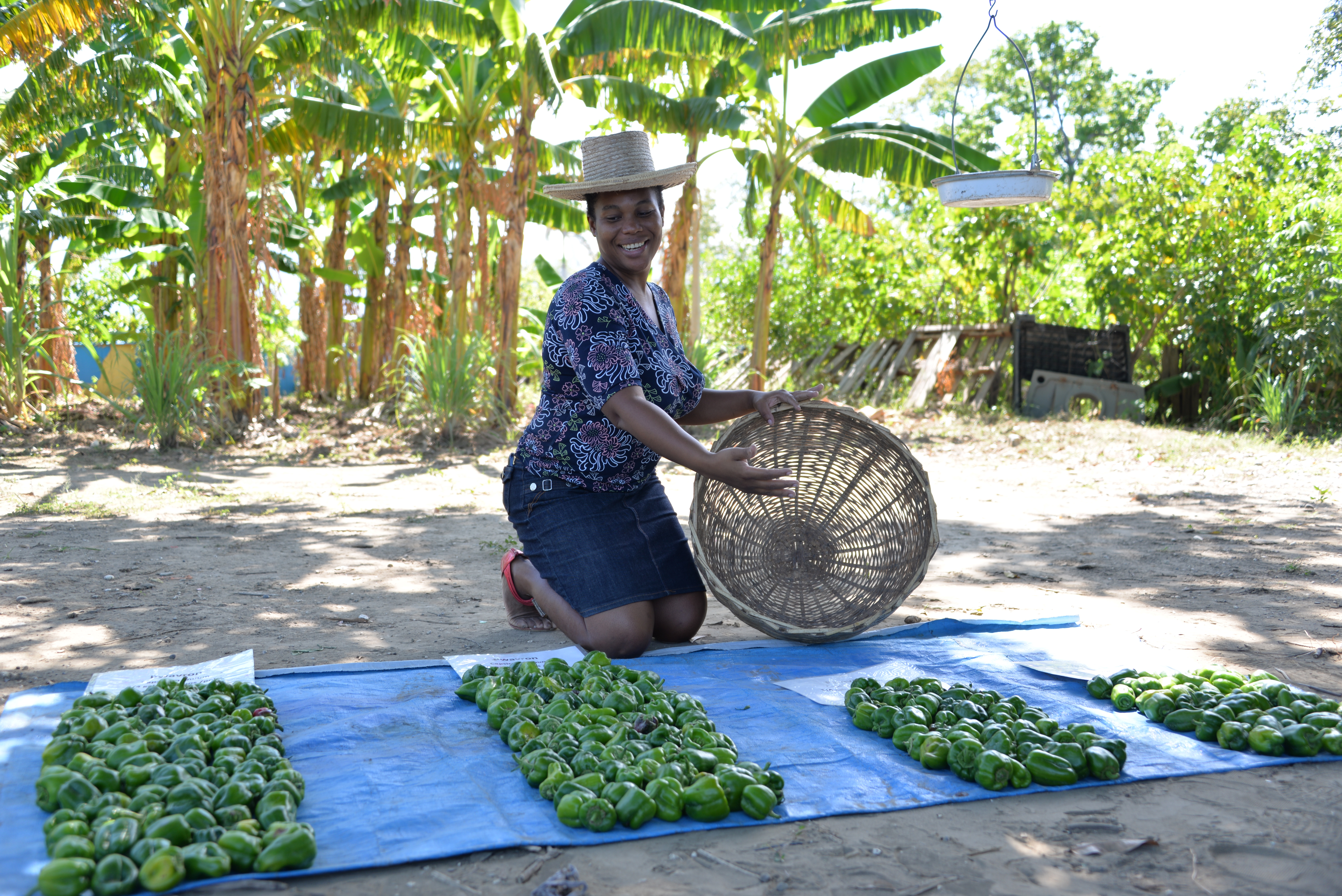
Harvest of capsicum grown with compost made from human excreta at an experimental garden in Haiti

Reuse of human excreta can be safe or unsafe. This article only discusses safe, beneficial use of treated human excreta after applying suitable treatment steps and risk management approaches that are customized for the intended reuse application. Beneficial uses of the treated excreta may focus on using the plant-available nutrients (mainly nitrogen, phosphorus and potassium) that are contained in the treated excreta. They may also make use of the organic matter and energy contained in the excreta. To a lesser extent, reuse of the excreta's water content might also take place, although this is better known as water reclamation from municipal wastewater. The intended reuse applications for the nutrient content may include: soil conditioner or fertilizer in agriculture or horticultural activities. Other reuse applications, which focus more on the organic matter content of the excreta, include use as a fuel source or as an energy source in the form of biogas.

There is a large and growing number of treatment options to make excreta safe and manageable for the intended reuse option. Options include urine diversion and dehydration of feces (urine-diverting dry toilets), composting (composting toilets or external composting processes), sewage sludge treatment technologies and a range of fecal sludge treatment processes. They all achieve various degrees of pathogen removal and reduction in water content for easier handling. Pathogens of concern are enteric bacteria, virus, protozoa, and helminth eggs in feces. As the helminth eggs are the pathogens that are the most difficult to destroy with treatment processes, they are commonly used as an indicator organism in reuse schemes. Other health risks and environmental pollution aspects that need to be considered include spreading micropollutants, pharmaceutical residues and nitrate in the environment which could cause groundwater pollution and thus potentially affect drinking water quality.

== Mine wastes ==
Mine tailings and other mining residues can be very large in volume and cause significant environmental issues even when stored correctly (such as tailings dam failures and acid mine drainage). Additionally, demand for the rare minerals found in tailings is increasing.

Sometimes reuse can be done on site to address other problems from mining, such as using alkaline rocks to abate acid mine drainage.

Red mud is a byproduct of the Bayer process which is the main process employed to generate alumina from bauxite. Numerous uses of the highly alkaline substance have been proposed, among them mitigating acid mine drainage.

The largest waste by volume - especially in open pit mining - is usually overburden which is either used to fill the mine back in when mining ceases or can be used for various construction purposes, as aggregate or to create infill. However, depending on the composition of the material, this may come with risks and hazards if pollutants like heavy metals contaminate the material. In mining operations that remove significant amounts of material even after filling the overburden back in, the resulting land is often below the natural water table. In Germany the former lignite pits were thus turned into the Lusatian Lake District, the Central German Lake District and other similar areas.

== Nuclear waste ==
While low and intermediate level waste are usually not the subject of much public attention, they make up the bulk (by volume and mass) of nuclear waste. However, spent fuel is responsible for the vast majority of the radioactivity produced by nuclear power plants.

There are active industrial scale applications of waste valorization using spent nuclear fuel - primarily nuclear reprocessing using the PUREX process which yields reactor grade plutonium for use in MOX-fuel as well as reprocessed uranium. In addition to that process, there are numerous proposals and small scale applications of recovering various substances for use. While over 90% of spent fuel is uranium, the rest (namely fission products, minor actinides and plutonium) has also attracted considerable attention. High value products contained in spent fuel have both radioactive applications such as Americium-241 for use in smoke detectors, Tritium, Neptunium-237 for use as a precursor to Plutonium-238 or various industrial radionuclides like Krypton-85, Caesium-137 or Strontium-90, as well as nonradioactive applications as some fission products decay quickly to stable or essentially stable nuclides. Elements in the latter category include xenon, ruthenium or rhodium. There are also proposals to use the decay heat of spent fuel, which is currently "wasted" in the spent fuel pool, to generate power and/or district heating. Strontium-90 is suitable as a fuel for a radioisotope thermoelectric generator and has been extracted from spent nuclear fuel for this purpose in the past. However, the need to process the highly reactive metal into the inert perovskite form Strontium titanate reduces the power density to "only" about 0.46 watts per gram. Caesium-137 can also be used for food irradiation.

== See also ==
- Waste & Biomass Valorization (ISSN 1877-265X)
- Journal of Industrial Ecology
- Journal of Environmental Management
