= Remix Fuel =

Type of nuclear fuel

REMIX-Fuel (REgenerated MIXture of U, Pu oxides) was developed in Russia to simplify the reprocessing process, reuse spent fuel, reduce the consumption of natural uranium and to enable multi-recycling.

== Compared to "conventional" MOX-fuel ==
MOX or mixed oxide fuel as deployed in some western European and East Asian nations generally consists of depleted uranium oxide mixed with between 4% and 7% reactor grade plutonium oxide. Only a few Generation II and about half of Generation III reactor designs are MOX fuel compliant allowing them to use a 100% MOX fuel load with no safety concerns.

=== Nuclear physics background ===
All moderated reactors using lightly enriched uranium fuel produce plutonium in the course of normal operation as uranium-238 (typically 94% to 97% of the uranium content in lightly enriched uranium) captures neutrons and undergoes successive beta decays until it is transmuted to plutonium-239. This internally produced plutonium increases in percentage until it is common enough that a growing percentage of fission reactions within the fuel are within the plutonium generated during the fuel cycle. Approximately half of the plutonium-239 "bred" during the fuel cycle is fissioned and another 25% is transmuted through additional neutron capture into other plutonium isotopes, primarily Pu-240. Virtually all of the minor actinides present in spent nuclear fuel are produced by successive neutron capture of the plutonium produced and as decay products of the more short lived isotopes. As a consequence of these factors the fresh uranium oxide fuel initially generates all of its fission reactions from U-235 but at the end of the cycle this has shifted to 50% U-235/50% Pu-239 fission reactions. In total about 33% of the energy generated by uranium fuel at the end of its life cycle comes from the bred and consumed Pu-239. Because the thermal neutron spectrum is not very good for fissioning Pu-239 the fuel shifts from 100% uranium at start of cycle to 96% uranium, 1% plutonium and 3% mixture of transuranic minor actinides and fission products. The longer the fuel remains in the reactor undergoing fission the more the uranium percentage decreases while the other materials increase. In effect all power reactors have been long known to be capable of operating with a mixed fissionable core containing 1% reactor grade plutonium without issues arising like those caused by the more highly concentrated MOX fuel used in western reactors. Ultimately, the spent fuel is removed from power reactors long before all available "fuel" is consumed, as neutron poisons and minor actinides with undesirable properties build up to unacceptable levels and alter the reaction parameters too much. Nuclear reprocessing is primarily done to remove undesirable parts of the spent fuel and either re-use the other parts or store them as waste. Reprocessed uranium for example, which is derived from spent fuel, usually has a higher uranium-235 content than natural uranium.

== Process ==
Russia spent nearly a decade developing techniques similar to nuclear pyroprocessing that allows them to reprocess spent nuclear fuel without separating the recycled uranium and plutonium as is done in the PUREX chemical reprocessing system used to manufacture MOX fuel. Small volumes of enriched uranium are added to this recovered mixture of non-separated uranium and plutonium so that it performs similarly to the fuel made only from freshly enriched uranium. After extensive testing in a reactor starting in 2016 Russia is now deploying Remix Fuel as replacement fuel for their VVER pressurized water reactors as of February 2020.

== Experiments at Balakovo Nuclear Power Plant ==
Balakovo Nuclear Power Plant is used for the pilot program. In December 2024 the third final 18-month phase of the program has started with the goal to achieve closed nuclear cycle for VVER reactors. A mixture of enriched uranium with recycled uranium and plutonium received from the used nuclear fuel at VVER reactors is used instead of a standard enriched uranium. After the first 2 stages of 3, fuel elements were inspected and were approved for the 3rd final stage. The 3rd stage should conclude in 2026 when the fuel will be unloaded and further studied. Remix fuel has a lower plutonium content of up to 5% compared with MOX fuel.
