= Title X (disambiguation) =

Title 10 may refer to:

- Title 10 of the United States Code
- Title 10 of the Code of Federal Regulations
- Title X of the Public Health Service Act, US federal grant program
- Title X of the Patriot Act
