= Petrolithium =

Petrolithium is lithium derived from petroleum brine, the mineral-rich salt solution that is brought to the surface during oil and gas production and exploration.

Oil companies manage petroleum brine as a waste product, usually by reinjecting the brine back into the ground for enhanced oil recovery or disposal. A small percent is also used for "beneficial reuse," which can include production of drilling fluids, irrigation or dust and ice control.

In recent years, several companies have explored technologies to extract the abundant minerals that are found in brines, including from petroleum brine. These minerals include lithium, silicon, magnesium and potassium.

== Process ==
Petrolithium is extracted using a patented nanofiltration process that allows for rapid extraction of lithium. Lithium chloride is separated from the oilfield wastewater in a matter of hours, rather than the months or years required in conventional extraction methods of solar evaporation or hard-rock mining.

== Companies ==
Several companies have explored lithium extraction technologies from brines. In 2012, California-based Simbol Materials developed a technology to separate lithium from brine produced by geothermal power plants. In 2013, Korean multinational steel company Posco developed a method to extract the mineral from continental brine. In 2017, MGX Minerals is developing a technology to extract lithium from petroleum brine. The company is building a pilot plant that would process 300 barrels per day.
