= Reprocessing =

Reprocessing may refer to:

- Nuclear reprocessing
- Recycling
