= Nozick =

Nozick is a surname. Notable people with the surname include:

- Bruce Nozick, American actor
- Linda Nozick, American civil and transportation engineer
- Robert Nozick (1938–2002), American philosopher
