= Nuclear Waste Technical Review Board =

The U.S. Nuclear Waste Technical Review Board was established in the 1987 Nuclear Waste Policy Amendments Act (NWPAA) (P.L. 100–203) to "...evaluate the technical and scientific validity of activities [related to managing and disposing of spent nuclear fuel and high-level radioactive waste] undertaken by the Secretary [of Energy], including

1. site characterization activities; and
2. activities relating to the packaging or transportation of high-level radioactive waste or spent nuclear fuel."

According to the Legislative History of the NWPAA, the purpose of the Board is to provide independent expert advice to Congress and the Secretary of Energy on technical and scientific issues and to review the technical and scientific validity of the U.S. Department of Energy's (DOE) implementation of the Nuclear Waste Policy Act (NWPA) (P.L. 97-425, as amended). In accordance with this mandate, the Board conducts ongoing technical and scientific peer review of DOE activities related to the management and disposition of commercial spent nuclear fuel (SNF) and of DOE SNF and high-level radioactive waste (HLW). The Board reports its findings, conclusions, and recommendations to Congress and the Secretary of Energy.

The Board is composed of eleven members who serve on a part-time basis and are appointed by the President from a list of nominees submitted by the National Academy of Sciences. Nominees to the Board must be eminent in a field of science or engineering and are selected solely on the basis of established records of distinguished service. The Board is nonpartisan and apolitical. By law, no nominee to the Board may be an employee of DOE, of a National Laboratory under contract to DOE, or of an entity performing HLW or SNF activities under contract to DOE.

The NWPAA grants significant investigatory powers to the Board: “The Board may hold such hearings, sit and act at such times and places, take such testimony, and receive such evidence as it considers appropriate.” At the request of the Board, and subject to existing law, DOE is required to provide all information necessary for the Board to conduct its technical review, including drafts of work products. According to the Legislative History of the NWPAA, Congress provided such access to allow the Board to review and comment on DOE decisions as they occur, not after the fact.

By Law, the Board shall cease to exist not later than 1 year after the date on which the Secretary begins disposal of HLW or SNF in a repository.

The Board is headquartered in Arlington, Virginia.

== History ==
For more than 20 years, DOE focused on developing a deep geologic repository for the permanent disposal of SNF and HLW at Yucca Mountain in Nevada, and the Board provided technical and scientific findings, conclusions, and recommendations on the technical and scientific validity of DOE's efforts. DOE submitted a license application for a Yucca Mountain repository to the U.S. Nuclear Regulatory Commission (NRC) in June 2008. In early 2010, DOE petitioned the NRC for permission to withdraw the license application. In August 2013, the U.S. Court of Appeals for the DC Circuit ruled that NRC must resume its review of the Yucca Mountain license application. The Board continues to evaluate the validity of DOE activities related to implementing the NWPA and reports the results of its review to Congress and the Secretary of Energy.

In January 2025 the United States Office of Personnel Management sent a letter to nine of the ten serving members of the board, asking them to resign or they would be terminated from their positions. By July 2025 there was only one remaining member on the board, Dr Peter Swift.

== See also ==
- Low-level radioactive waste policy of the United States
- Nuclear energy policy of the United States
- Title 10 of the Code of Federal Regulations
