= Spent fuel pool =

Storage pools for spent nuclear fuel

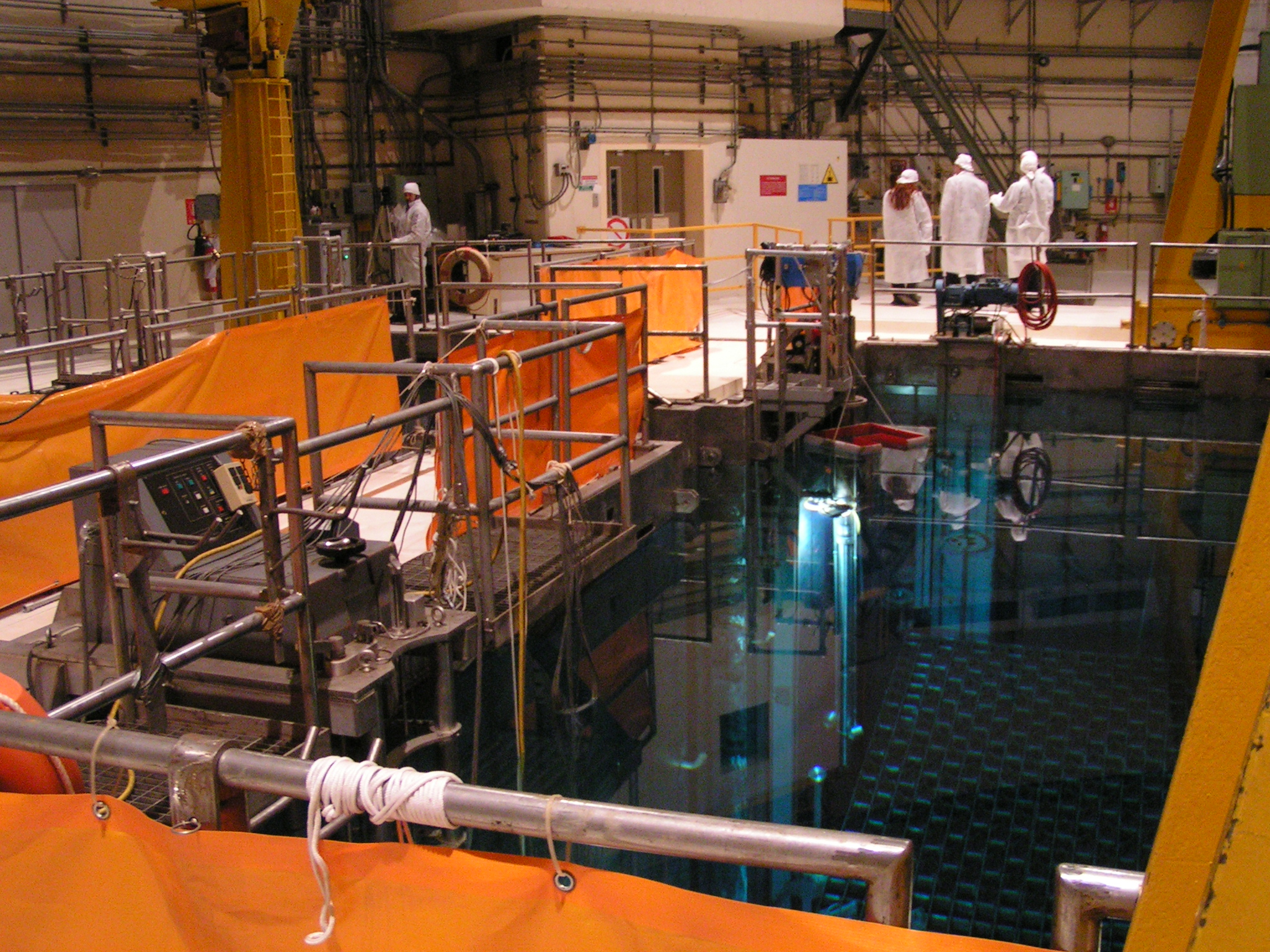
Example of a spent fuel pool from the shut-down Caorso Nuclear Power Plant. This pool is not holding large amounts of material.

Spent fuel pools (SFP) are storage pools (or "ponds" in the United Kingdom) for spent fuel from nuclear reactors. They are typically 40 or more feet (12 m) deep, with the bottom 14 feet (4.3 m) equipped with storage racks designed to hold fuel assemblies removed from reactors. A reactor's local pool is specially designed for the reactor in which the fuel was used and is situated at the reactor site. Such pools are used for short-term cooling of the fuel rods. This allows short-lived isotopes to decay and thus reduces the ionizing radiation and decay heat emanating from the rods. The water cools the fuel and provides radiological protection from its radiation.

Pools also exist on sites remote from reactors, for longer-term storage such as the Independent Spent Fuel Storage Installation (ISFSI), located at the Morris Operation, or as a production buffer for 10 to 20 years before being sent for reprocessing or dry cask storage.

While only about 20 feet (about 6 m) of water are needed to keep radiation levels below acceptable levels, the extra depth provides a safety margin and allows fuel assemblies to be manipulated without special shielding to protect the operators.

== Operation ==
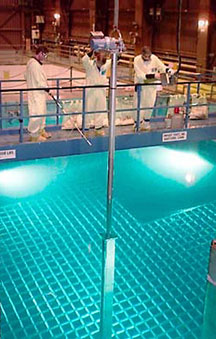
Spent fuel pool

About a quarter to a third of the total fuel load of a reactor is removed from the core every 12 to 24 months and replaced with fresh fuel. Spent fuel rods generate heat and radiation that must be contained. Fuel is moved from the reactor and manipulated in the pool generally by automated handling systems, although some manual systems are still in use. In the SFP at a pressurized water reactor (PWR), the fuel bundles fresh from the core are normally segregated for several months for initial cooling before being sorted into other parts of the pool to wait for final disposal. Metal racks keep the fuel in controlled positions for physical protection and for ease of tracking and rearrangement. High-density racks also incorporate boron-10, often as boron carbide (Metamic, Boraflex, Boral, Tetrabor and Carborundum) or other neutron-absorbing material to ensure subcriticality. Water quality is tightly controlled to prevent the fuel or its cladding from degrading. This can include monitoring the water for contamination by actinides, which could indicate a leaking fuel rod. In addition, boric acid may be added to the water in PWR spent fuel pools to further increase the margin to criticality. Current regulations in the United States permit re-arranging of the spent rods so that maximum efficiency of storage can be achieved.

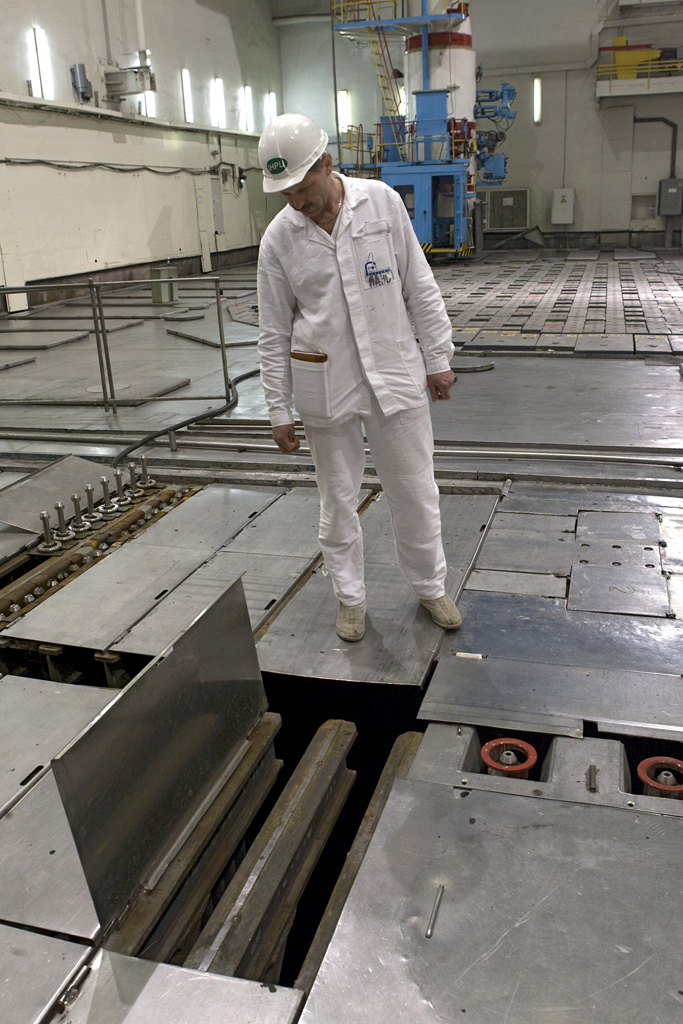
Worker examines a pond for storing spent fuel rods at the Leningrad nuclear power plant in Sosnovy Bor.

The maximum temperature of the spent fuel bundles decreases significantly between two and four years, and less from four to six years. The fuel pool water is continuously cooled to remove the heat produced by the spent fuel assemblies. Pumps circulate water from the spent fuel pool to heat exchangers, then back to the spent fuel pool. The water temperature in normal operating conditions is held below 50 °C (120 °F). Radiolysis, the dissociation of molecules by radiation, is of particular concern in wet storage, as water may be split by residual radiation and hydrogen gas may accumulate increasing the risk of explosions. For this reason the air in the room of the pools, as well as the water, must be continually monitored and treated.

== Other possible configurations ==
Rather than manage the pool's inventory to minimize the possibility of continued fission activity, China is building a 200 MW nuclear reactor to run on used fuel from nuclear power stations to generate process heat for district heating and desalination. Essentially an SFP operated as a deep swimming pool reactor; it will operate at atmospheric pressure, which will reduce the engineering requirements for safety.

Other research envisions a similar low-power reactor using spent fuel where instead of limiting the production of hydrogen by radiolysis, it is encouraged by the addition of catalysts and ion scavengers to the cooling water. This hydrogen would then be removed to use as fuel.

== Risks ==
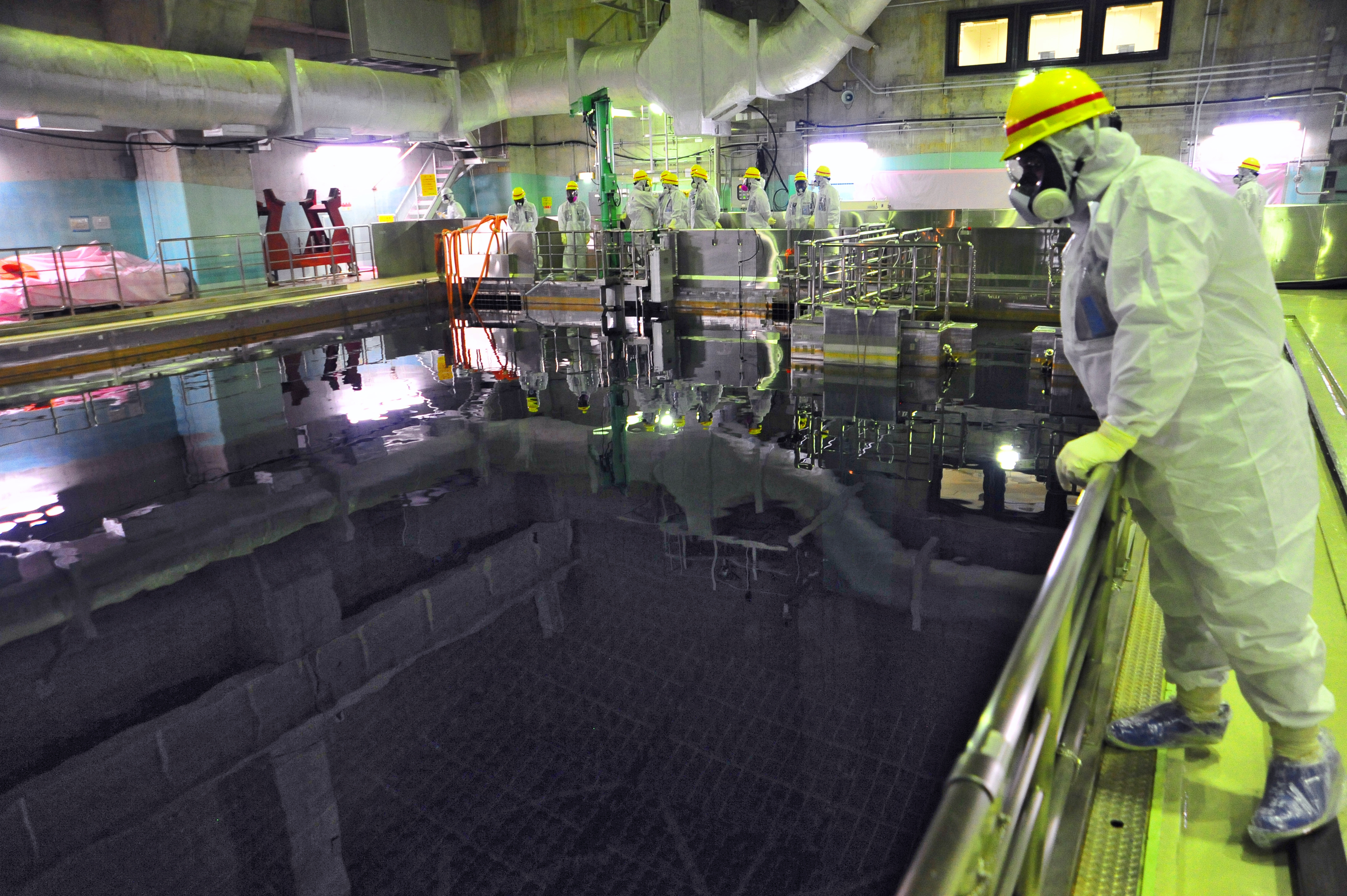
Pool inspected by IAEA following the Fukushima nuclear disaster.

The neutron absorbing materials in spent fuel pools have been observed to degrade over time, reducing the safety margins of maintaining subcriticality; in addition, it has been shown that the in-site measurement technique used to evaluate these neutron absorbers (Boron Areal Density Gauge for Evaluating Racks, or BADGER) has an unknown degree of uncertainty.

If there is a prolonged interruption of cooling due to emergency situations, the water in the spent fuel pools may boil off, possibly resulting in radioactive elements being released into the atmosphere.

In the magnitude 9 earthquake that struck the Fukushima nuclear plants in March 2011, three of the spent fuel pools were in buildings which had been damaged and were seen to be emitting water vapour. The US NRC wrongly stated that the pool at reactor 4 had boiled dry—this was denied at the time by the Government of Japan and found to be incorrect in subsequent inspection and data examination.

According to nuclear plant safety specialists, the chances of criticality in a spent fuel pool are very small, usually avoided by the dispersal of the fuel assemblies, inclusion of a neutron absorber in the storage racks and overall by the fact that the spent fuel has too low an enrichment level to self-sustain a fission reaction. They also state that if the water covering the spent fuel evaporates, there is no element to enable a chain reaction by moderating neutrons.

According to Dr. Kevin Crowley of the Nuclear and Radiation Studies Board, "successful terrorist attacks on spent fuel pools, though difficult, are possible. If an attack leads to a propagating zirconium cladding fire, it could result in the release of large amounts of radioactive material." After the September 11, 2001 attacks the Nuclear Regulatory Commission required American nuclear plants "to protect with high assurance" against specific threats involving certain numbers and capabilities of assailants. Plants were also required to "enhance the number of security officers" and to improve "access controls to the facilities".

On August 31, 2010, a diver servicing the spent fuel pool at the Leibstadt Nuclear Power Plant (KKL) was exposed to radiation in excess of statutory annual dose limits after being told by his supervisor to retrieve by hand an unidentified section of tubing that had fallen to the floor of the pool. This object was later identified as a segment of protective tubing that shielded a radiation monitor in the reactor core, where it had been rendered highly radioactive by neutron flux. The section of tubing had been accidentally sheared off during fuel transfer four years prior and had lain on the floor of the fuel pool until the day of the accident. The diver placed the tubing in his tool bag and began his ascent to the surface. His personal dosimeter immediately sounded an alarm but its klaxon was drowned out by bubble noise from the diver's respirator. The reactor hall's radiation sensors also immediately sounded as the tool bag was passed to other workers at the rim of the fuel pool. The bag was quickly returned to the water. The diver received a hand dose of about 1 Sievert, nearly twice the statutory whole-body limit of 0.5 Sv. According to KKL authorities the diver has suffered no long-term consequences from his exposure. Disciplinary action against the supervisor was found not to be warranted.

== See also ==
- Deep geological repository
- Dry cask storage
- Lists of nuclear disasters and radioactive incidents
- Nuclear fuel cycle
- Radioactive waste
- Spent nuclear fuel shipping cask
- Cherenkov radiation
