= Linda Nozick =

American transportation engineer

Linda K. Nozick
- Born: Linda K. Nozick
- Education: George Washington University (B.S. 1989); University of Pennsylvania (M.S.E. 1990, Ph.D. 1992)
- Awards: Presidential Early Career Award (PECASE) (1997); National Science Foundation CAREER Award (1997); DOE-OSTI Winter Simulation Conference Best Contributed Paper (2021)
- Engineering career
- Discipline: Systems engineering, civil engineering, operations research
- Practice name: School of Civil and Environmental Engineering at Cornell (Director); Cornell Systems Engineering Program (Co-founder & Director)
- Projects: Time-dependent routing algorithms for hazardous-materials transport Mathematical modeling of disaster recovery and critical infrastructure resilience Stochastic optimization for fleet planning

Linda Karen Nozick is an American civil engineer and transportation engineer whose research has applied methods from operations research and systems engineering to problems including fleet management, optimal facility location for product distribution, emergency planning for shelters and transportation in extreme weather, the robustness of electrical grids to natural disasters and terrorist attacks, and the global supply chain. She is a professor at Cornell University, where she directs Cornell's School of Civil and Environmental Engineering.

Nozick majored in Systems Analysis and Engineering at George Washington University, graduating in 1989. She continued her studies at the University of Pennsylvania, where she received a master's degree in 1990 and completed her Ph.D. in 1992. Her dissertation, A model of intermodal rail-truck service for operations management, investment planning, and costing, was supervised by Edward K. Morlok.

She was a 1997 recipient of the Presidential Early Career Award for Scientists and Engineers, given "for development of innovative solutions to problems associated with transportation of hazardous waste and incorporating non-traditional skills into undergraduate transportation engineering courses". In 2011, she was appointed by president Barack Obama to the Nuclear Waste Technical Review Board.
