= Reprocessed uranium =

Uranium recovered from spent nuclear fuel reprocessing

Reprocessed uranium (RepU) is the uranium recovered from nuclear reprocessing, as done commercially in France, the UK and Japan and by nuclear weapons states' military plutonium production programs. This uranium makes up the bulk of the material separated during reprocessing.

Commercial LWR spent nuclear fuel contains on average (excluding cladding) only four percent plutonium, minor actinides and fission products by weight. Despite it often containing more fissile material than natural uranium, reuse of reprocessed uranium has not been common because of low prices in the uranium market of recent decades, and because it contains undesirable isotopes of uranium.

Isotopic composition of reprocessed uranium
Isotope	Proportion	Characteristics
uranium-238	98.5%	Fertile material
uranium-237	0%	Around 0.001% at discharge, but half-life only 1 week. Produces soluble, long-lived neptunium-237 which is hard to contain in a geological repository. ^{237}Np is the feedstock for the production of ^{238}Pu which is used in radioisotope thermoelectric generators
uranium-236	0.4–0.6%	Neither fissile nor fertile. Affects reactivity.
uranium-235	0.5–1.0%	Fissile material
uranium-234	>0.02%	Fertile material but can affect reactivity differently
uranium-233	trace	Fissile material
uranium-232	trace	Fertile material, decay product thallium-208 emits strong gamma radiation making handling difficult

Given sufficiently high uranium prices, it is feasible for reprocessed uranium to be re-enriched and reused. It requires a higher enrichment level than natural uranium to compensate for its higher levels of ^{236}U which is lighter than ^{238}U and therefore concentrates in the enriched product. As enrichment concentrates lighter isotopes on the "enriched" side and heavier isotopes on the "depleted" side, ^{234}U will inevitably be enriched slightly stronger than ^{235}U, which is a negligible effect in a once-through fuel cycle due to the low (55 ppm) share of ^{234}U in natural uranium can become relevant after successive passes through an enrichment-burnup-reprocessing-enrichment cycle, depending on enrichment and burnup characteristics. ^{234}U readily absorbs thermal neutrons and converts to fissile ^{235}U, which needs to be taken into account if it reaches significant proportions of the fuel material. If ^{235}U interacts with a fast neutron there is a chance of a (n,2n) "knockout" reaction. Depending on the characteristics of the reactor and burnup, this can be a larger source of ^{234}U in spent fuel than enrichment. If fast breeder reactors ever come into widespread commercial use, reprocessed uranium, like depleted uranium, will be usable in their breeding blankets.

There have been some studies involving the use of reprocessed uranium in CANDU reactors. CANDU is designed to use natural uranium as fuel; the ^{235}U content remaining in spent PWR/BWR fuel is typically greater than that found in natural uranium, which is about 0.72% ^{235}U, allowing the re-enrichment step to be skipped. Fuel cycle tests also have included the DUPIC (Direct Use of spent PWR fuel In CANDU) fuel cycle, where used fuel from a pressurized water reactor (PWR) is packaged into a CANDU fuel bundle with only physical reprocessing (cut into pieces) but no chemical reprocessing. Opening the cladding inevitably releases volatile fission products like xenon, tritium or krypton-85. Some variations of the DUPIC fuel cycle make deliberate use of this by including a voloxidation step whereby the fuel is heated to drive off semi-volatile fission products or subjected to one or more reduction / oxidation cycles to transform nonvolatile oxides into volatile native elements and vice versa.

The direct use of recovered uranium to fuel a CANDU reactor was first demonstrated at Qinshan Nuclear Power Plant in China. The first use of re-enriched uranium in a commercial LWR was in 1994 at the Cruas Nuclear Power Plant in France.

In 2020, France, one of the countries with the biggest reprocessing capacity, held a stock of 40,020 tonnes (39,390 long tons; 44,110 short tons) of reprocessed uranium, up from 24,100 tonnes (23,700 long tons; 26,600 short tons) in 2010. Every year France processes 1,100 tonnes (1,100 long tons; 1,200 short tons) of spent fuel into 11 tonnes (11 long tons; 12 short tons) reactor grade plutonium (for immediate further processing into MOX fuel) and 1,045 tonnes (1,028 long tons; 1,152 short tons) of reprocessed uranium which is largely stockpiled. There are provisions in place for the storage of this reprocessed uranium for up to 250 years for potential future use. Given France's domestic uranium enrichment capabilities, this stockpile constitutes a strategic reserve for the case of a major disruption of uranium supply as France does not have domestic uranium mining.
