= Title X of the Patriot Act =

Title X: Miscellaneous is the last of ten titles which comprise the USA PATRIOT Act, a bill passed in the United States after the September 11, 2001 attacks. It contains 16 sections that do not fall under other titles in the act.

== Sec. 1001. Review of the Department of Justice. ==
The Inspector General of the Department of Justice will appoint a single official who will handle all civil rights and civil liberties abuse claims. Contact information for the official will be made public through the internet, television, and radio.

== Sec. 1002. Sense of congress. ==
Congress finds that all Americans condemn the attacks of September 11, 2001. Also, Sikh-Americans should not be discriminated against.

== Sec. 1003. Definition of 'electronic surveillance'. ==
In FISA, one of the definitions of electronic surveillance is amended to read: "Electronic surveillance is the acquisition by an electronic, mechanical, or other surveillance device of the contents of any wire communication to or from a person in the United States, without the consent of any party thereto, if such acquisition occurs in the United States, but does not include the acquisition of those communications of computer trespassers that would be permissible under section 2511 (2)(i) of title 18." There are 3 other definitions of electronic surveillance in FISA.

== Sec. 1004. Venue in money laundering cases. ==
The jurisdiction and venue for prosecution of money laundering is expanded to allow for arrest and prosecution in any area that money laundering takes place or where transactions are made.

== Sec. 1005. First responders assistance act. ==
Up to $25 million is allowed to be appropriated each year from 2003 to 2007 for state-level terrorism prevention and anti-terrorism training grants.

== Sec. 1006. Inadmissibility of aliens engaged in money laundering. ==
Aliens who are known to have participated in money laundering or are attempting to enter the U.S. to participate in money laundering may not be admitted into the United States.

== Sec. 1007. Authorization of funds for DEA police training in South and Central Asia ==
President Bush must provide at least $5 million in 2002 to the Republic of Turkey for drug enforcement and South and East Asia for chemical controls.

== Sec. 1008. Feasibility study on use of biometric identifier scanning system with access to the FBI integrated automated fingerprint identification system at overseas consular posts and points of entry to the United States. ==
The Attorney General will create a study on the feasibility of using biometric identifiers to identify people as they attempt to enter the United States. It will be connected to the FBI's database to flag suspected criminals.

== Sec. 1009. Study of access. ==
Up to $250,000 will be provided to the FBI so it can provide a computer-based list of suspected terrorists' names to the airlines.

== Sec. 1010. Temporary authority to contract with local and State governments for performance of security functions at United States military installations. ==
The Department of Defense's funding may be used for private contracts for security purposes.

== Sec. 1011. Crimes against charitable Americans. ==
Charity fraud is amended. Solicitors must promptly tell the person they call that they are calling to solicit money or something else of value.

== Sec. 1012. Limitation on issuance of hazmat licenses ==
Before getting a license to transport hazardous materials, the driver must have a background check and demonstrate that they are fit to handle the materials.

== Sec. 1013. Expressing the sense of the senate concerning the provision of funding for bioterrorism preparedness and response. ==
The Senate feels that the United States is not prepared to defend against terrorist attacks and must put an effort into preparing at all levels from city to state to federal.

== Sec. 1014. Grant program for State and local domestic preparedness support. ==
States will receive money to buy equipment and training for first responders (police, fire, ambulance.).

== Sec. 1015. Expansion and reauthorization of the crime identification technology act for antiterrorism grants to States and localities. ==
Extends the $250,000 yearly appropriations for counter-terrorism grants to states and territories from 2003 to 2007.
