= Title 10 of the Code of Federal Regulations =

US title on nuclear energy

Title 10 of the Code of Federal Regulations is one of 50 titles composing the United States Code of Federal Regulations (CFR) and contains the principal set of rules and regulations issued by federal agencies regarding nuclear energy. It is available in digital and printed form and can be referenced online using the Electronic Code of Federal Regulations (e-CFR).

== Structure ==
The table of contents, as reflected in the e-CFR updated December 20, 2023, is as follows:

Chapter	Parts ^{[1]}	Regulatory Entity
I	1-199	Nuclear Regulatory Commission
II	200-699	Department of Energy
III	700-999	Department of Energy
X	1000-1099	Department of Energy (General Provisions)
XIII	1300-1399	Nuclear Waste Technical Review Board
XVII	1700-1799	Defense Nuclear Facilities Safety Board
XVIII	1800-1899	Northeast Interstate Low-Level Radioactive Waste Commission

Parts 0 to 199 are the requirements (and reserved for the requirements) prescribed by the United States Nuclear Regulatory Commission (NRC) and binding on all persons and organizations who receive a license from NRC to use nuclear materials or operate nuclear facilities. Licensing is required for the design, manufacture, construction, operation and decommissioning of nuclear reactors. These facilities can be commercial, research or test reactors. The authority is broad covering the licensing of individual facilitatory operators to the entities which operate these facilities.
