= MOX fuel =

Type of nuclear fuel

Mixed oxide fuel (MOX fuel) is nuclear fuel that contains more than one oxide of fissile material, usually consisting of plutonium blended with natural uranium, reprocessed uranium, or depleted uranium. MOX fuel is an alternative to the low-enriched uranium fuel used in the light-water reactors that predominate nuclear power generation.

For example, a mixture of 7% plutonium and 93% natural uranium reacts similarly, although not identically, to low-enriched uranium fuel (3 to 5% uranium-235). MOX usually consists of two phases, UO_{2} and PuO_{2}, and/or a single phase solid solution (U,Pu)O_{2}. The content of PuO_{2} may vary from 1.5 wt.% to 25–30 wt.% depending on the type of nuclear reactor.

One attraction of MOX fuel is that it is a way of utilizing surplus weapons-grade plutonium, an alternative to storage of surplus plutonium, which would need to be secured against the risk of theft for use in nuclear weapons. On the other hand, some studies warned that normalizing the global commercial use of MOX fuel and the associated expansion of nuclear reprocessing would increase, rather than reduce, the risk of nuclear proliferation, by encouraging increased separation of plutonium from spent fuel in the civil nuclear fuel cycle.

== Overview ==
In every uranium-based nuclear reactor core there is both fission of uranium isotopes such as uranium-235, and the formation of new, heavier isotopes due to neutron capture, primarily by uranium-238. Most of the fuel mass in a reactor is uranium-238. By neutron capture and two successive beta decays, uranium-238 becomes plutonium-239, which, by successive neutron capture, becomes plutonium-240, plutonium-241, plutonium-242, and (after further beta decays) other transuranic or actinide nuclides. Plutonium-239 and plutonium-241 are fissile, like uranium-235. Small quantities of uranium-236, neptunium-237 and plutonium-238 are formed similarly from uranium-235.

Normally, with low-enriched uranium fuel being changed every five years or so, most of the plutonium-239 is "burned" in the reactor. It behaves like uranium-235, with a slightly higher cross section for fission, and its fission releases a similar amount of energy. Typically, about one percent of the spent fuel discharged from a reactor is plutonium, and some two-thirds of the plutonium is plutonium-239. Worldwide, almost 100 tonnes of plutonium in spent fuel arises each year.

Reprocessing the plutonium into usable fuel increases the energy derived from the original uranium by some 12%, and if the uranium-235 is also recycled by re-enrichment, this becomes about 20%. Plutonium is only reprocessed and used once as MOX fuel; spent MOX fuel, with a high proportion of minor actinides and plutonium isotopes, is stored as waste.

Existing nuclear reactors must be re-licensed before MOX fuel can be introduced because using it changes the operating characteristics of a reactor, and the plant must be designed or adapted slightly to take it; for example, more control rods are needed. Often only a third to half of the fuel load is switched to MOX, but for more than 50% MOX loading, significant changes are necessary and a reactor needs to be designed accordingly. The System 80 reactor design deployed at the U.S. Palo Verde Nuclear Generating Station near Phoenix, Arizona was designed for 100% MOX core compatibility, but so far has always operated on fresh low enriched uranium. In theory, the three Palo Verde reactors could use the MOX arising from seven conventionally fueled reactors each year and would no longer require fresh uranium fuel.

Fast neutron BN-600 and BN-800 reactors are designed for 100% MOX loading. In 2022, the BN-800 was fully loaded with MOX fuel for the first time.

According to Atomic Energy of Canada Limited (AECL), CANDU reactors could use 100% MOX cores without physical modification. AECL reported to the United States National Academy of Sciences committee on plutonium disposition that it has extensive experience in testing the use of MOX fuel containing from 0.5 to 3% plutonium.

== Spent MOX fuel ==
The content of un-burnt plutonium in spent MOX fuel from thermal reactors is significant – greater than 50% of the initial plutonium loading. However, during the burning of MOX the ratio of fissile (odd numbered) isotopes to non-fissile (even) drops from around 65% to 20%, depending on burn up. This makes any attempt to recover the fissile isotopes difficult and any bulk Pu recovered would require such a high fraction of Pu in any second generation MOX that it would be impractical. This means that such a spent fuel would be difficult to reprocess for further reuse (burning) of plutonium. Regular reprocessing of biphasic spent MOX is difficult because of the low solubility of PuO_{2} in nitric acid.

As of 2015, the only demonstration of twice-recycled, high-burnup fuel occurred in the Phénix fast reactor.

== Applications ==
A used MOX, which has 63 GW days (thermal) of burnup and has been examined with a scanning electron microscope using electron microprobe attachment. The lighter the pixel in the right hand side the higher the plutonium content of the material at that spot

Reprocessing of commercial nuclear fuel to make MOX is performed in France and to a lesser extent in Russia, India and Japan. In the UK THORP operated from 1994 to 2018. China plans to develop fast breeder reactors and reprocessing. Reprocessing of spent commercial-reactor nuclear fuel is not permitted in the United States due to nonproliferation considerations. Germany had plans for a reprocessing plant at Wackersdorf but as this failed to materialize, it instead relied on French nuclear reprocessing capabilities until legally outlawing the transport of German spent fuel for reprocessing in 2005.

The United States was building a MOX fuel plant at the Savannah River Site in South Carolina. Although the Tennessee Valley Authority (TVA) and Duke Energy expressed interest in using MOX reactor fuel from the conversion of weapons-grade plutonium, TVA (the most likely customer) said in April 2011 that it would delay a decision until it could see how MOX fuel performed in the nuclear accident at Fukushima Daiichi. In May 2018, the Department of Energy reported that the plant would require another $48 billion to complete, on top of the $7.6 billion already spent. Construction was cancelled.

=== Thermal reactors ===
Most modern thermal reactors using high burn up uranium oxide fuel produce a significant proportion of their output towards the end of core life from fission of plutonium produced by neutron capture in uranium 238 earlier in the life of the core, so adding some plutonium oxide to the fuel at manufacture is not in principle a very radical step. About 30 thermal reactors in Europe (Belgium, the Netherlands, Switzerland, Germany and France) are using MOX and an additional 20 have been licensed to do so. Most reactors use it as about one third of their core, but some will accept up to 50% MOX assemblies. In France, EDF aims to have all its 900 MWe series of reactors running with at least one-third MOX. Japan aimed to have one third of its reactors using MOX by 2010, and has approved construction of a new reactor with a complete fuel loading of MOX. As 2011, of the total nuclear fuel used, MOX provides about 2%.

Licensing and safety issues of using MOX fuel include:

- Plutonium oxide is substantially more toxic than uranium oxide, making fuel manufacture more difficult and expensive.
- As plutonium isotopes absorb more neutrons than uranium fuels, reactor control systems may need modification.
- MOX fuel tends to run hotter because of lower thermal conductivity, which may be an issue in some reactor designs.
- Fission gas release in MOX fuel assemblies may limit the maximum burn-up time of MOX fuel.

About 30% of the plutonium originally loaded into MOX fuel is consumed by use in a thermal reactor. In theory, if one third of the core fuel load is MOX and two-thirds uranium fuel, there is zero net change in the mass of plutonium in the spent fuel and the cycle could be repeated, but there are multiple difficulties in reprocessing spent MOX fuel. As of 2010, plutonium is only recycled once in thermal reactors, and spent MOX fuel is separated from the rest of the spent fuel to be stored as waste.

All plutonium isotopes are either fissile or fertile, although plutonium-242 needs to absorb 3 neutrons before becoming fissile curium-245; in thermal reactors isotopic degradation limits the plutonium recycle potential. About 1% of spent nuclear fuel from current LWRs is plutonium, with approximate isotopic composition 52% ^{239}_{94}Pu, 24% ^{240}_{94}Pu, 15% ^{241}_{94}Pu, 6% ^{242}_{94}Pu and 2% ^{238}_{94}Pu when the fuel is first removed from the reactor.

=== Fast reactors ===
Because the fission-to-capture ratio of high energy or fast neutrons changes to favour fission for almost all of the actinides, including ^{238}_{92}U, fast reactors could use all of them for fuel. All actinides can undergo neutron induced fission with unmoderated or fast neutrons. A fast reactor is therefore more efficient than a thermal reactor for using plutonium and higher actinides as fuel.

These fast reactors are better suited for the transmutation of other actinides than thermal reactors. Because thermal reactors use slow or moderated neutrons, the actinides that are not fissionable with thermal neutrons tend to absorb the neutrons instead of fissioning. This leads to a buildup of heavier actinides and lowers the number of thermal neutrons available to continue the chain reaction. A subcritical reactor with an external neutron source could either be run in the fast neutron spectrum (without the need for highly enriched fuels as otherwise common in fast reactors) or use thermal neutrons to breed fissile materials, compensating the loss of neutrons by increasing the flux from the neutron source.

== Fabrication ==
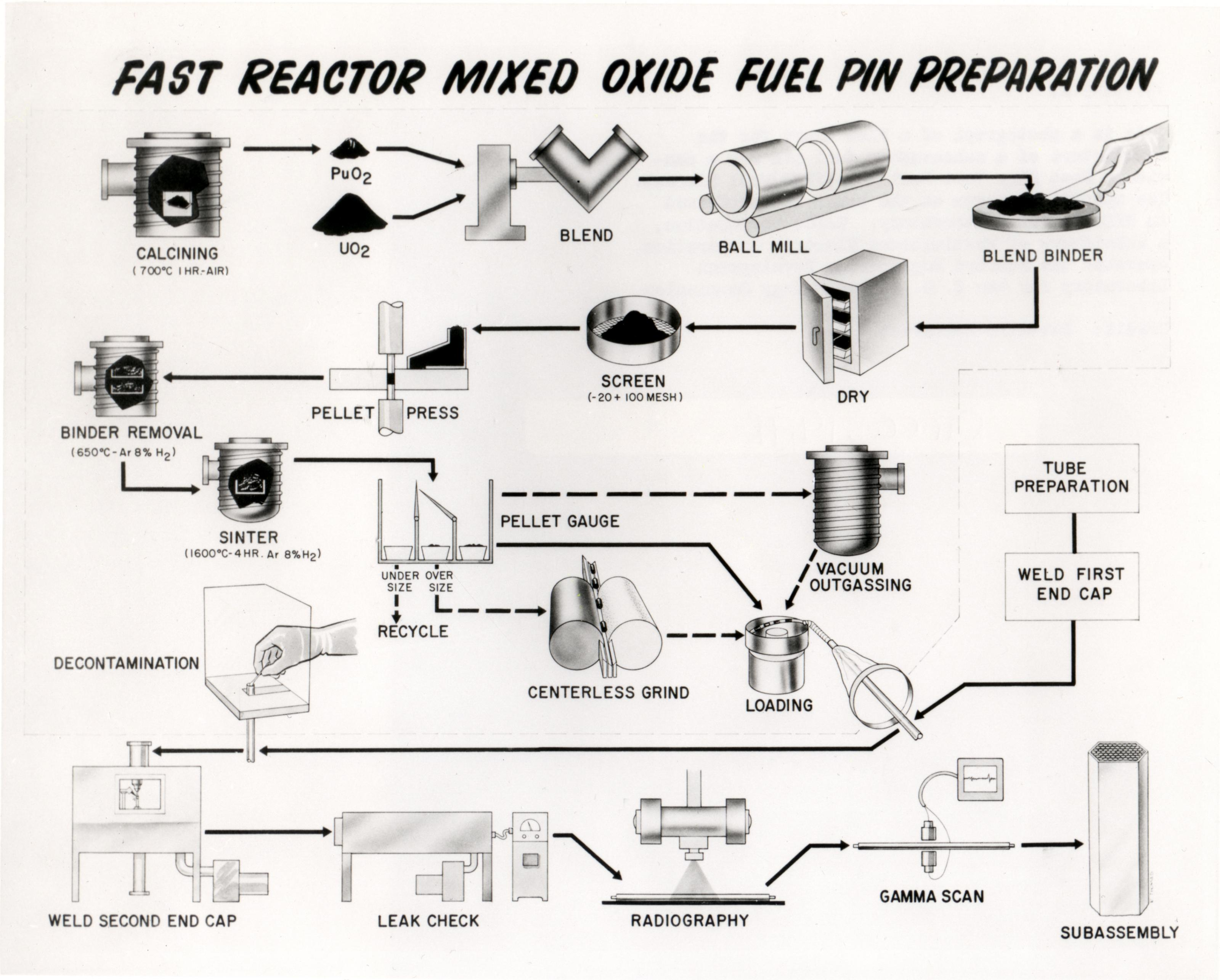
Fabrication process for mixed oxide fuel.

=== Plutonium separation ===
The first step is separating the plutonium from the remaining uranium (about 96% of the spent fuel) and the fission products with other wastes (together about 3%) using the PUREX process.

=== Dry mixing ===
MOX fuel can be made by grinding together uranium oxide (UO_{2}) and plutonium oxide (PuO_{2}) before the mixed oxide is pressed into pellets, but this process has the disadvantage of forming much radioactive dust.

=== Coprecipitation ===
A mixture of uranyl nitrate and plutonium nitrate in nitric acid is converted by treatment with a base such as ammonia to form a mixture of ammonium diuranate and plutonium hydroxide. After heating in a mixture of 5% hydrogen and 95% argon will form a mixture of uranium dioxide and plutonium dioxide. Using a base, the resulting powder can be run through a press and converted into pellets. The pellets can then be sintered into mixed uranium and plutonium oxide.

== Americium content ==
Plutonium from reprocessed fuel is usually fabricated into MOX within less than five years of its production to avoid problems resulting from impurities produced by the decay of short-lived isotopes of plutonium. In particular, plutonium-241 decays to americium-241 with a 14-year half-life. Because americium-241 is a gamma ray emitter, its presence is a potential occupational health hazard. It is possible, however, to remove the americium from the plutonium by a chemical separation process. Even under the worst conditions, the americium/plutonium mixture is less radioactive than a spent-fuel dissolution liquor, so it should be relatively straightforward to recover the plutonium by PUREX or another aqueous reprocessing method.

== Curium content ==
It is possible that both americium and curium could be added to a U/Pu MOX fuel before it is loaded into a fast reactor or a subcritical reactor run in "Actinide burner mode". This is one means of transmutation. Work with curium is much harder than americium because curium is a neutron emitter, the MOX production line would need to be shielded with both lead and water to protect the workers.

Also, the neutron irradiation of curium generates the higher actinides, such as californium, which increase the neutron dose associated with the used nuclear fuel; this has the potential to pollute the fuel cycle with strong neutron emitters. As a result, it is likely that curium will be excluded from most MOX fuels. A subcritical reactor such as the Accelerator Driven System could "burn" such fuels if the problems associated with their handling and transportation are solved. However, to avoid power excursions due to unintended criticality, the neutronics must be known precisely at any given point in time, including the effect of build-up or consumption of neutron emitting nuclides as well as neutron poisons.

== Thorium MOX ==
MOX fuel containing thorium and plutonium oxides is also being tested. According to a Norwegian study, "the coolant void reactivity of the thorium-plutonium fuel is negative for plutonium contents up to 21%, whereas the transition lies at 16% for MOX fuel." The authors concluded, "Thorium-plutonium fuel seems to offer some advantages over MOX fuel with regards to control rod and boron worths, CVR and plutonium consumption."

== See also ==
- Hanford Site
- Nuclear breeder reactor
- Nuclear fission
- Nuclear fuel cycle
- Nuclear power
- Nuclear power plant
- Remix Fuel
- Spent nuclear fuel shipping cask
