= Nuclear reprocessing =

Chemical separation of spent nuclear fuel

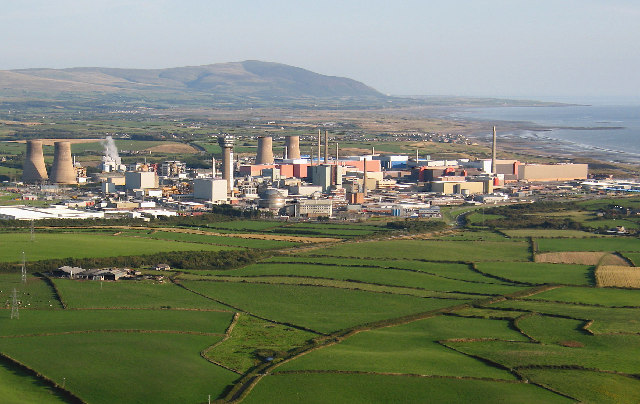
Sellafield nuclear reprocessing site, UK

Nuclear reprocessing is the chemical separation of fission products and actinides from spent nuclear fuel. Originally, reprocessing was used to extract plutonium for producing nuclear weapons. With commercialization of nuclear power, reprocessed plutonium was recycled into MOX nuclear fuel for thermal reactors. Reprocessed uranium can in principle be re-used as fuel. Nuclear reprocessing may include the reprocessing of other nuclear reactor material, such as Zircaloy cladding.

The high radioactivity of spent fuel means that reprocessing must be controlled and executed in advanced facilities by specialized personnel. Numerous processes exist, dominated by the chemical-based PUREX process. Alternatives include heating to drive off volatile elements, oxidation, and fluoride volatility (which uses reactive fluorine gas). Each process results in some form of refined nuclear product, with radioactive waste as a byproduct. Because this could allow production of weapons grade nuclear material, nuclear reprocessing is a concern for nuclear proliferation.

Spent fuel reprocessing is relatively expensive compared to the once-through fuel cycle, but fuel use can be increased and waste volumes decreased. Reprocessing is performed routinely in Europe, Russia, and Japan. The United States halted commercial reprocessing plans in the 1970s but has continued to pursue reprocessing-related scientific research. Most nuclear fuel does not require reprocessing. Breeder reactors can use recycled plutonium and uranium as well as other actinides, closing the nuclear fuel cycle and potentially multiplying the energy extracted from natural uranium by ~60-fold and dramatically reducing long-lived high-level radioactive waste.

Spent nuclear fuel contains abundant fertile uranium and traces of fissile materials. Methods such as the PUREX process can be used to remove useful actinides for the production of active nuclear fuel.

Another option is to reuse specific isotopes. Caesium-137, strontium-90 and other isotopes are extracted for food irradiation and radioisotope thermoelectric generators. While re-use does not eliminate the need to manage radioisotopes, it can reduce the quantity of remaining waste.

== Separated components and disposition ==
The potentially useful components dealt with in nuclear reprocessing comprise specific actinides (plutonium, uranium, and some minor actinides). The lighter elements components include fission products, activation products, and cladding.

material	disposition
plutonium, minor actinides, reprocessed uranium	fission in fast, fusion fission hybrid, or subcritical reactor or use as MOX fuel
reprocessed uranium, filters	less stringent storage as intermediate-level waste
long-lived fission and activation products	nuclear transmutation or geological repository
medium-lived fission products ^{137}Cs and ^{90}Sr	medium-term storage as high-level waste; decay heat could be used to drive a Stirling engine
useful radionuclides, rare earths (lanthanides), and noble metals	industrial and medical uses
cladding, fission product zirconium	re-use for zircalloy cladding or storage as intermediate level waste

== History ==
The first large-scale nuclear reactors were built during World War II. These reactors were designed for the production of plutonium for use in nuclear weapons. The only reprocessing required, therefore, was the extraction of the plutonium (free of fission-product contamination) from the spent natural uranium fuel. In 1943, several methods were proposed for separating the relatively small quantity of plutonium from the uranium and fission products. The first method selected, a precipitation process called the bismuth phosphate process, was developed and tested at Oak Ridge National Laboratory (ORNL) between 1943 and 1945. It produced plutonium for evaluation and use in US weapons programs. ORNL produced the first macroscopic quantities (grams) of separated plutonium with this process.

The bismuth phosphate process was first operated on a large scale at the Hanford Site, in the later part of 1944. It successfully separated plutonium, but it had a significant weakness: it could not recover uranium.

The PUREX process was the first successful solvent extraction process for uranium and plutonium, developed at ORNL in 1949. It remains the current method. Separation plants were constructed at Savannah River Site and a smaller plant at West Valley Reprocessing Plant, which closed by 1972 because of its inability to meet new regulatory requirements.

In October 1976, concern of nuclear weapons proliferation (especially after India demonstrated nuclear weapons capabilities using reprocessing technology) led President Gerald Ford to issue a Presidential directive to indefinitely suspend the commercial reprocessing and recycling of plutonium in the U.S. On 7 April 1977, President Jimmy Carter banned the reprocessing of commercial reactor spent nuclear fuel. The key issue driving this policy was the risk of nuclear weapons proliferation by diversion of plutonium from the civilian fuel cycle, and to encourage other nations to follow the US lead. After that, only countries that already had large investments in reprocessing infrastructure continued to reprocess spent nuclear fuel. President Reagan lifted the ban in 1981, but did not provide the substantial subsidy that would have been necessary to start up commercial reprocessing.

Civilian fuel is reprocessed at the COGEMA La Hague site in France, the Sellafield site in the United Kingdom, the Mayak Chemical Combine in Russia, and at sites such as the Tokai plant in Japan, and the Tarapur plant in India.

In March 1999, the U.S. Department of Energy (DOE) reversed its policy and signed a contract with a consortium of Duke Energy, COGEMA, and Stone & Webster (DCS) to design and operate a mixed oxide (MOX) fuel fabrication facility. Site preparation at the Savannah River Site (South Carolina) began in October 2005. In 2011 the New York Times reported "...11 years after the government awarded a construction contract, the cost of the project has soared to nearly $5 billion. The vast concrete and steel structure is a half-finished hulk, and the government has yet to find a single customer, despite offers of lucrative subsidies." TVA (the most likely customer) said in April 2011 that it would delay a decision until it could see how MOX fuel performed in the nuclear accident at Fukushima Daiichi.

== Separation technologies ==
=== Water and organic solvents ===
==== PUREX ====
PUREX is the standard method as of 2026. It is an acronym standing for Plutonium and Uranium Recovery by EXtraction. The PUREX process is a liquid-liquid extraction method used to separately extract uranium and plutonium.

When used on power reactor fuel, the plutonium extracted typically contains too much ^{240}Pu to be considered weapons-grade plutonium. Nevertheless, reliable nuclear weapons can be built at all sophistication levels using reactor-grade plutonium. Moreover, reactors that are capable of frequent refueling can be used to produce weapons-grade plutonium, which can be recovered using PUREX.

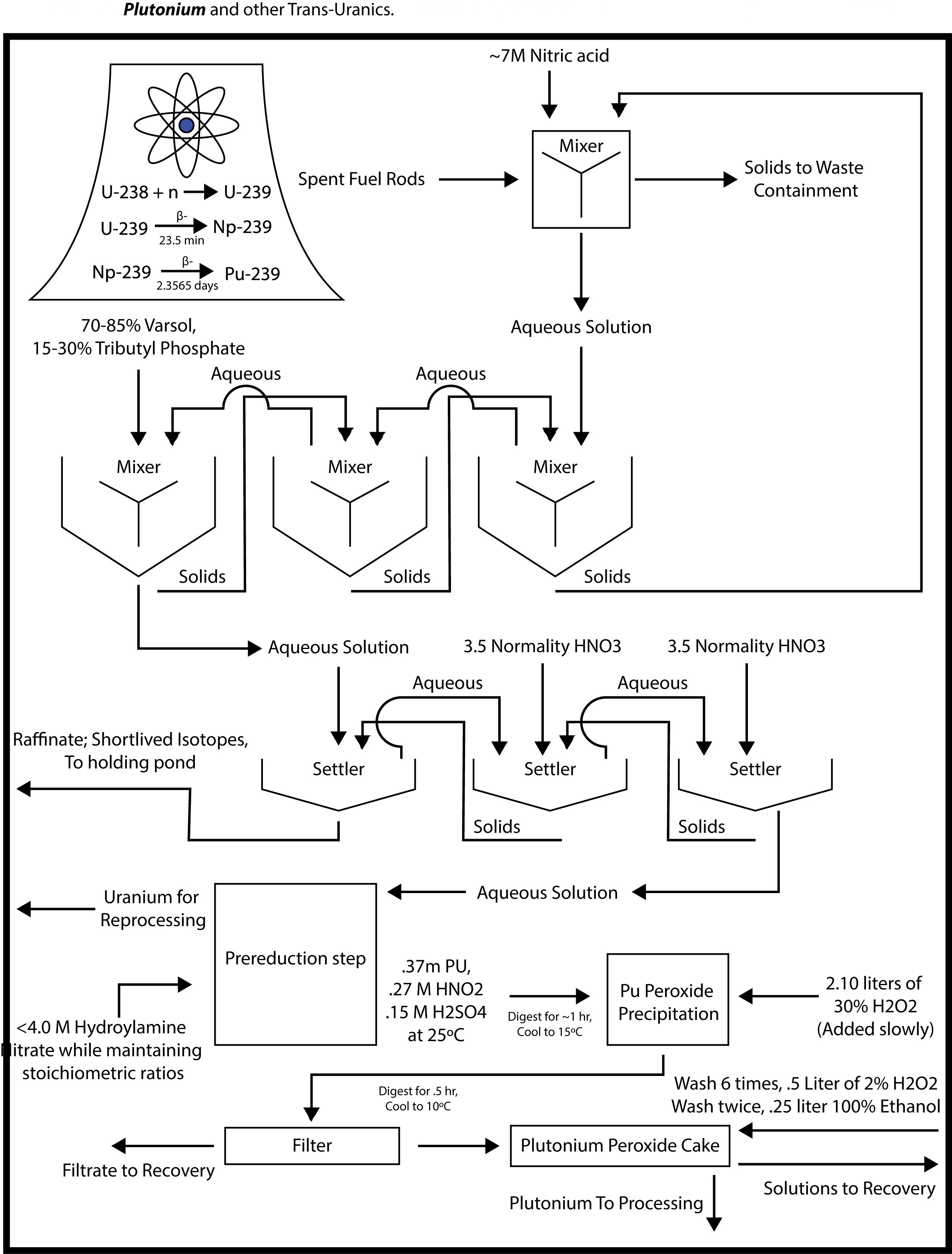
Plutonium Processing

==== Modifications ====
Many of these concepts, particularly those that separate the minor actinides once U and Pu have been extracted, are extracted via advanced reprocessing.

===== UREX =====
UREX (URanium EXtraction) process is a modified form of PUREX that can save space inside disposal sites by removing the uranium that makes up the majority of the mass and volume and recycling it.

UREX avoids separating pure plutonium. This can be done by adding a plutonium reductant before the first extraction step. In the UREX process, ~99.9% of the uranium and >95% of technetium are separated. The key is the addition of acetohydroxamic acid (AHA) to the extraction and scrub sections of the process. The addition of AHA diminishes the extractability of plutonium and neptunium, providing somewhat greater proliferation resistance than with PUREX.

===== TRUEX =====
Adding a second extraction agent, octyl(phenyl)-N, N-dibutyl carbamoylmethyl phosphine oxide (CMPO) in combination with tributylphosphate, (TBP), PUREX can become TRUEX (TRansUranic EXtraction). TRUEX was invented by Argonne National Laboratory and is designed to remove the transuranic metals (Americum/Curium) from waste. The idea is that by lowering alpha activity, the majority can be disposed of more easily. Like PUREX TRUEX operates by solvation.

===== DIAMEX =====
The DIAMEX (DIAMide EXtraction) process avoids the formation of organic materials that contains elements other than carbon, hydrogen, nitrogen, and oxygen. Such organic waste can be burned without the formation of acidic gases. The French CEA works on DIAMEX. The process is sufficiently mature that an industrial plant could be constructed.DIAMEX operates by a solvation mechanism.

===== SANEX =====
Selective ActiNide EXtraction. As part of the management of minor actinides it has been proposed that the lanthanides and trivalent minor actinides should be removed from the PUREX raffinate by a process such as DIAMEX or TRUEX. To allow the actinides such as americium to be either reused in industrial sources or used as fuel, the lanthanides must be removed. Several lanthanides have large neutron cross-sections and poison a neutron-driven nuclear reactions. To date the extraction system has not been defined, but research groups are working towards a process. For instance CEA is working on a bis-triazinyl pyridine (BTP) process. Other systems such as dithiophosphinic acids are under investigation.

===== UNEX =====
The UNiversal EXtraction process was developed in Russia and the Czech Republic; it is designed to remove the most troublesome radioisotopes (strontium, caesium and minor actinides) from the raffinate remaining after the extraction of uranium and plutonium. The chemistry is based upon Cs and Sr interaction with polyethylene glycol and a cobalt carborane anion (known as chlorinated cobalt dicarbollide). The actinides are extracted by CMPO, with diluents such as a polar aromatic such as nitrobenzene. Other diluents such as meta-nitrobenzotrifluoride and phenyl trifluoromethyl sulfone have been suggested.

==== Electrochemical and ion exchange methods ====
One exotic method uses electrochemistry and ion exchange in ammonium carbonate. Other ion exchange methods use alkaline carbonate and "fumed" lead oxide.

==== Obsolete methods ====
===== Bismuth phosphate =====
The bismuth phosphate process is an obsolete process that adds significant unnecessary material to the final radioactive waste. The bismuth phosphate process has been replaced by solvent extraction processes. The bismuth phosphate process was designed to extract plutonium from aluminium-clad nuclear fuel rods, containing uranium. The fuel was decladded by boiling it in caustic soda. After decladding, the uranium metal was dissolved in nitric acid.

The plutonium at this point is in the +4 oxidation state. It was then precipitated out of the solution by the addition of bismuth nitrate and phosphoric acid to form the bismuth phosphate. The plutonium was coprecipitated with this. The supernatant liquid (containing many of the fission products) was separated from the solid. The precipitate was then dissolved in nitric acid before the addition of an oxidant (such as potassium permanganate) to produce PuO_{2}^{2+}. The plutonium was maintained in the +6 oxidation state by addition of a dichromate salt.

The bismuth phosphate was next re-precipitated, leaving the plutonium in solution, and an iron(II) salt (such as ferrous sulfate) was added. The plutonium was again re-precipitated using a bismuth phosphate carrier and a combination of lanthanum salts and fluoride added, forming a solid lanthanum fluoride carrier for the plutonium. Addition of an alkali produced an oxide. The combined lanthanum plutonium oxide was collected and extracted with nitric acid to form plutonium nitrate.

===== Hexone or REDOX =====
This is a liquid-liquid extraction process which uses methyl isobutyl ketone codenamed hexone as the extractant. The extraction is by a solvation mechanism. This process has the disadvantage of requiring the use of a salting-out reagent (aluminium nitrate) to increase the nitrate concentration in the aqueous phase to obtain a reasonable distribution ratio (D value). Also, hexone is degraded by concentrated nitric acid. This process was used in 1952-1956 on the Hanford S plant (REDOX plant) and has been replaced by the PUREX process.

Pu^{4+} + 4NO^{−}_{3} + 2S → [Pu(NO_{3})_{4}S_{2}]

===== Butex, β,β'-dibutyoxydiethyl ether =====
A process based on a solvation extraction process using the triether extractant named above. This process has the disadvantage of requiring the use of a salting-out reagent (aluminium nitrate) to increase the nitrate concentration in the aqueous phase to obtain a reasonable distribution ratio. This process was used at Windscale in 1951–1964. This process has been replaced by PUREX, which was shown to be a superior technology for larger scale reprocessing.

===== Sodium acetate =====
The sodium uranyl acetate process was used by the early Soviet nuclear industry to recover plutonium from irradiated fuel. It was never used in the West; the idea is to dissolve the fuel in nitric acid, alter the oxidation state of the plutonium, and then add acetic acid and base. This would convert the uranium and plutonium into a solid acetate salt.

Explosion of the crystallized acetates-nitrates in a non-cooled waste tank caused the Kyshtym disaster in 1957.

== Alternatives to PUREX ==
Some alternatives are compatible with PUREX (i.e. the residue from one process could be used as feedstock for the other) while others are wholly incompatible. None of these had (as of the 2020s) reached widespread use, although large scale tests and firm commitments point towards their future implementation.

=== Pyroprocessing ===
Pyroprocessing (from Greek Πυρος = fire) is a process in which materials are subjected to high temperatures (typically over 800 °C) in order to bring about a chemical or physical change. Pyroprocessing encompasses ore-roasting, calcination and sintering. Equipment for pyroprocessing includes kilns, electric arc furnaces and reverberatory furnaces.

Solvents are molten salts (e.g. LiCl + KCl or LiF + CaF_{2}) and molten metals (e.g. cadmium, bismuth, magnesium) rather than water and organic compounds. Electrorefining, distillation, and solvent-solvent extraction are common steps.

These processes were pioneered at Argonne National Laboratory with ongoing research in Russia, at CRIEPI in Japan, the Nuclear Research Institute of Řež in Czech Republic, Indira Gandhi Centre for Atomic Research in India and KAERI in South Korea.

Cement manufacturing is a common application. The raw material mix (raw meal) is fed to a kiln. As with most industries, pyroprocessing is the most energy-intensive part of the industrial process. The technique is under investigation for use in spent fuel reprocessing.

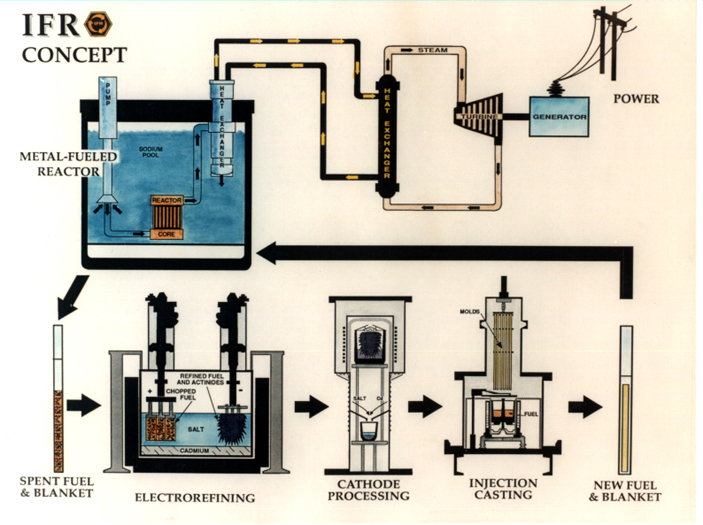
The most developed, though commercially unfielded, alternative reprocessing method, is Pyroprocessing, suggested as part of the depicted metallic-fueled, Integral fast reactor (IFR) a sodium fast reactor concept of the 1990s. After the spent fuel is dissolved in molten salt, all of the recyclable actinides, consisting largely of plutonium and uranium though with important minor constituents, are extracted using electrorefining/electrowinning. The resulting mixture keeps the plutonium at all times in an unseparated gamma and alpha emitting actinide form, that is also mildly self-protecting in theft scenarios.

=== Electrolysis ===
The electrolysis methods are based on the difference in the standard potentials of uranium, plutonium and minor actinides in a molten salt. The standard potential of uranium is the lowest, therefore when a potential is applied, the uranium will be reduced at the cathode out of the molten salt solution before the other elements.

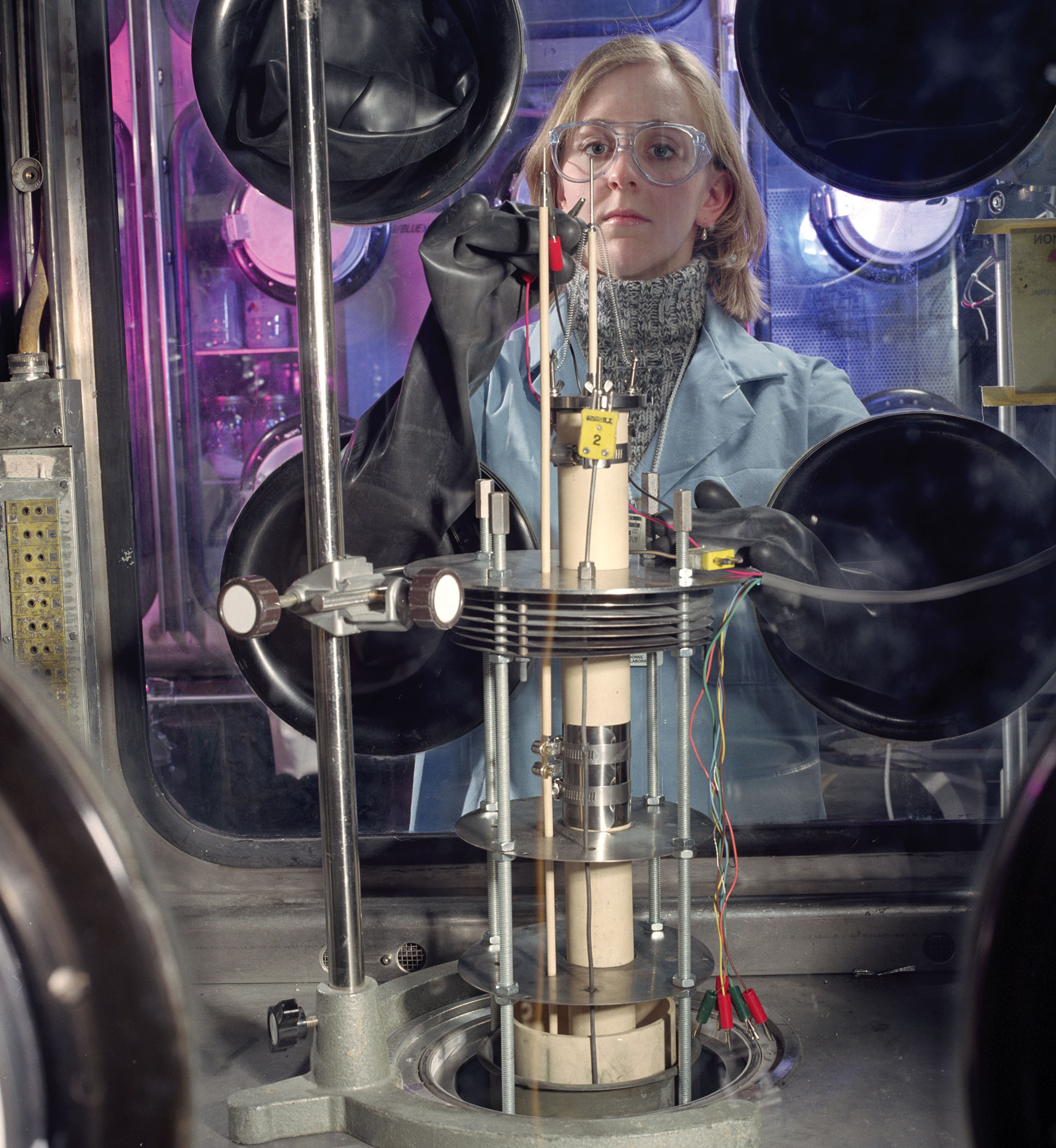
Experimental electro refinement cell at Argonne National Laboratory

==== PYRO-A and -B for IFR ====
These processes were developed by Argonne National Laboratory and used in the Integral Fast Reactor project.

PYRO-A is a means of separating actinides (elements within the actinide family, generally heavier than U-235) from non-actinides. The spent fuel is placed in an anode basket which is immersed in a molten salt electrolyte. An electric current is applied, causing the uranium metal (or sometimes oxide, depending on the spent fuel) to plate out on a solid metal cathode while the other actinides (and the rare earths) can be absorbed into a liquid cadmium cathode. Many of the fission products (such as caesium, zirconium and strontium) remain in the salt. As alternatives to the molten cadmium electrode it is possible to use a molten bismuth cathode, or a solid aluminium cathode.

As an alternative to electrowinning, the wanted metal can be isolated by using a molten alloy of an electropositive metal and a less reactive metal.

Since the majority of the long term radioactivity, and volume, of spent fuel comes from actinides, removing the actinides produces waste that is more compact, and not nearly as dangerous over the long term. The radioactivity of this waste will then drop to the level of various naturally occurring minerals and ores within a few hundred, rather than thousands of, years.

The mixed actinides produced by pyrometallic processing can be used again as nuclear fuel, as they are virtually all either fissile, or fertile, though many of these materials would require a fast breeder reactor to be burned efficiently. In a thermal neutron spectrum, the concentrations of several heavy actinides (curium-242 and plutonium-240) can become quite high, creating fuel that is substantially different from the usual uranium or mixed uranium-plutonium oxides (MOX) that most current reactors were designed to use.

Another pyrochemical process, the PYRO-B process, has been developed for the processing and recycling of fuel from a transmuter reactor ( a fast breeder reactor designed to convert transuranic nuclear waste into fission products ). A typical transmuter fuel is free from uranium and contains recovered transuranics in an inert matrix such as metallic zirconium. In the PYRO-B processing of such fuel, an electrorefining step is used to separate the residual transuranic elements from the fission products and recycle the transuranics to the reactor for fissioning. Newly generated technetium and iodine are extracted for incorporation into transmutation targets, and the other fission products are sent to waste.

=== Voloxidation ===
Voloxidation (for volumetric oxidation or volatile oxidation) involves heating oxide fuel with oxygen, sometimes with alternating oxidation and reduction, or alternating oxidation by ozone to uranium trioxide with decomposition by heating back to triuranium octoxide. A major purpose is to capture tritium as tritiated water vapor before further processing where it would be difficult to retain the tritium. Tritium is a difficult contaminant to remove from aqueous solution, as it cannot be separated from water except by isotope separation. However, tritium is also a valuable product used in industry science and nuclear weapons, so recovery of a stream of hydrogen or water with a high tritium content can make targeted recovery economically worthwhile. Other volatile elements leave the fuel and must be recovered, especially iodine, technetium, and carbon-14. Voloxidation also breaks up the fuel or increases its surface area to enhance penetration of reagents in following reprocessing steps.

==== Advantages ====
- The process is simple and requires no complex machinery or chemicals above and beyond that required in all reprocessing (hot cells, remote handling equipment).
- Products such as krypton-85 or tritium, as well as xenon (whose isotope are either stable, very nearly stable, or quickly decay), can be recovered and sold for use in industry, science or medicine.
- Driving off volatile fission products allows for safer storage in interim storage or deep geological repository.
- Nuclear proliferation risks are low as no separation of plutonium occurs.
- Radioactive material is not chemically mobilized beyond what should be accounted for in long-term storage anyway. Substances that are inert as native elements or oxides remain so.
- The product can be used as fuel in a CANDU reactor or even downblended with similarly treated spent CANDU fuel if too much fissile material is left in the spent fuel.
- The resulting product can be further processed by any of the other processes mentioned above and below. Removal of volatile fission products means that transportation becomes slightly easier compared to spent fuel with damaged or removed cladding.
- All volatile products of concern (while helium will be present in the spent fuel, there won't be any radioactive isotopes of helium) can in principle be recovered in a cold trap cooled by liquid nitrogen (temperature: 77 K (−196.2 °C; −321.1 °F) or lower). However, this requires significant amounts of cooling to counteract the effect of decay heat from radioactive volatiles like krypton-85. Tritium will be present in the form of tritiated water, which is a solid at the temperature of liquid nitrogen.
- Technetium heptoxide can be removed as a gas by heating above its boiling point of 583.8 K (310.6 °C; 591.2 °F) which reduces the issues presented by technetium contamination in processes like fluoride volatility or PUREX; ruthenium tetroxide (gaseous above 129.6 K (−143.6 °C; −226.4 °F)) can likewise be removed from the spent fuel and recovered for sale or disposal.

==== Disadvantages ====
- Further processing is needed if the resulting product is to be used for re-enrichment or fabrication of MOX-fuel.
- If volatile fission products escape to the environment this presents a radiation hazard, mostly due to ^{129}I, Tritium and ^{85}Kr. Their safe recovery and storage requires further equipment.
- An oxidizing agent / reducing agent has to be used for reduction/oxidation steps whose recovery can be difficult, energy consuming or both.

=== Volatilization in isolation ===
Simply heating spent oxide fuel in an inert atmosphere or vacuum at a temperature between 700 °C (1,292 °F) and 1,000 °C (1,830 °F) as a first reprocessing step can remove several volatile elements, including caesium whose isotope caesium-137 emits about half of the heat produced by the spent fuel over the following 100 years of cooling (however, most of the other half is from strontium-90, which has a similar half-life). The estimated overall mass balance for 20,000 g of processed fuel with 2,000 g of cladding is:

	Input	Residue	Zeolite filter	Carbon filter	Particle filters
Palladium	28	14	14		
Tellurium	10	5	5		
Molybdenum	70		70		
Caesium	46		46		
Rubidium	8		8		
Silver	2		2		
Iodine	4			4	
Cladding	2000	2000			
Uranium	19218	19218			?
Others	614	614			?
Total	22000	21851	145	4	0

==== Advantages ====
- Requires no chemical processes at all.
- Can in theory be done "self heating" via the decay heat of sufficiently "fresh" spent fuel.
- Caesium-137 has uses in food irradiation and can be used to power radioisotope thermoelectric generators. However, its contamination with stable ^{133}Cs and long lived ^{135}Cs reduces efficiency of such uses while contamination with ^{134}Cs in relatively fresh spent fuel makes the curve of overall radiation and heat output much steeper until most of the ^{134}Cs has decayed.
- Can potentially recover elements like ruthenium whose ruthenate ion is particularly troublesome in PUREX and which has no isotopes significantly longer lived than a year, allowing possible recovery of the metal for use.
- A "third phase recovery" can be added to the process if substances that melt but don't vaporize at the temperatures involved are drained to a container for liquid effluents and allowed to re-solidify. To avoid contamination with low-boiling products which melt at low temperatures, a melt plug could be used to open the container for liquid effluents only once a certain temperature is reached by the liquid phase.
- Strontium, which is present in the form of the particularly troublesome mid-lived fission product ^{90}Sr is liquid above 1,050 K (780 °C; 1,430 °F). However, Strontium oxide remains solid below 2,804 K (2,531 °C; 4,588 °F) and if strontium oxide is to be recovered with other liquid effluents, it has to be reduced to the native metal before the heating step. Both Strontium and Strontium oxide form soluble Strontium hydroxide and hydrogen upon contact with water, which can be used to separate them from non-soluble parts of the spent fuel..
- As there are little to no chemical changes in the spent fuel, any chemical reprocessing methods can be used following this process

==== Disadvantages ====
- At temperatures above 1,000 K (730 °C; 1,340 °F) the native metal form of several actinides, including neptunium (melting point: 912 K (639 °C; 1,182 °F)) and plutonium (melting point: 912.5 K (639.4 °C; 1,182.8 °F)), are molten. This could be used to recover a liquid phase, raising proliferation concerns, given that uranium metal remains a solid until 1,405.3 K (1,132.2 °C; 2,069.9 °F). While neptunium and plutonium cannot be easily separated from each other by different melting points, their differing solubility in water can be used to separate them.
- If "nuclear self heating" is employed, the spent fuel with have much higher specific activity, heat production and radiation release. If an external heat source is used, significant amounts of external power are needed, which mostly go to heat the uranium.
- Heating and cooling the vacuum chamber and/or the piping and vessels to collect volatile effluents induces thermal stress. This combines with radiation damage to material and possibly neutron embrittlement if neutron sources such as californium-252 are present to a significant extent.
- In the commonly used oxide fuel, some elements will be present both as oxides and as native elements. Depending on their chemical state, they may end up in either the volatalized stream or in the residue stream. If an element is present in both states to a significant degree, separation of that element may be impossible without converting it all to one chemical state or the other.
- The temperatures involved are much higher than the melting point of lead (600.61 K (327.46 °C; 621.43 °F)) which can present issues with radiation shielding if lead is employed as a shielding material.
- If filters are used to recover volatile fission products, those become low- to intermediate level waste.

=== Fluoride volatility ===
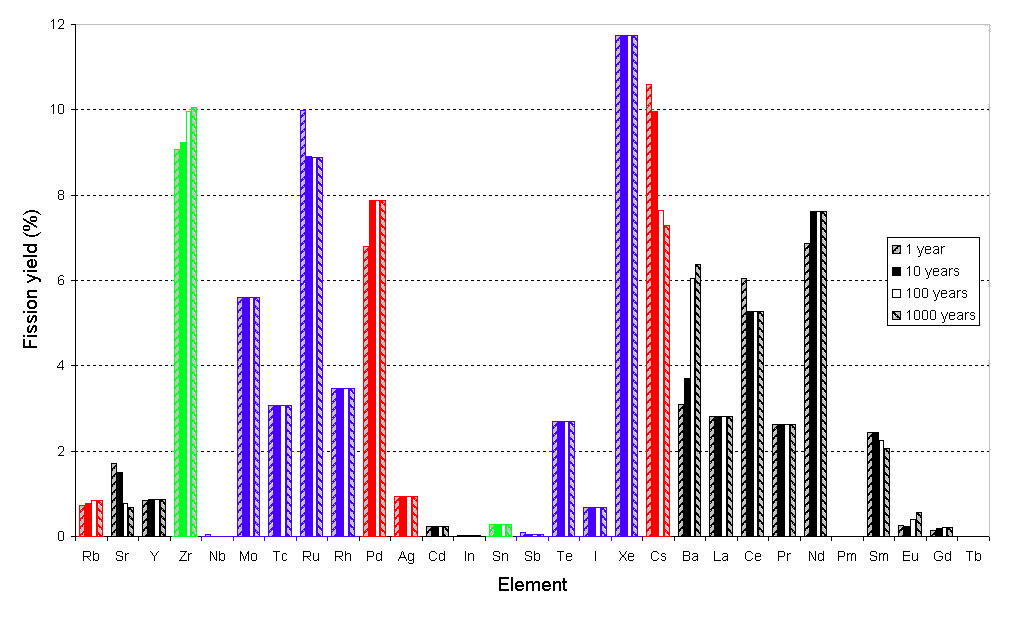
Blue elements have volatile fluorides or are already volatile; green elements do not but have volatile chlorides; red elements have neither, but the elements themselves or their oxides are volatile at very high temperatures. Yields at 10^{0,1,2,3} years after fission, not considering later neutron capture, fraction of 100% not 200%. Beta decay Kr-85→Rb, Sr-90→Zr, Ru-106→Pd, Sb-125→Te, Cs-137→Ba, Ce-144→Nd, Sm-151→Eu, Eu-155→Gd visible.

In the fluoride volatility process, fluorine is reacted with the fuel. Fluorine is so much more reactive than even oxygen that small particles of ground oxide fuel will burst into flame when dropped into a chamber full of fluorine. This is known as flame fluorination; the heat produced helps the reaction proceed. Most of the uranium, which makes up the bulk of the fuel, is converted to uranium hexafluoride, the form of uranium used in uranium enrichment, which has a very low boiling point. Technetium, the main long-lived fission product, is also efficiently converted to its volatile hexafluoride. A few other elements also form similarly volatile hexafluorides, pentafluorides, or heptafluorides. The volatile fluorides can be separated from excess fluorine by condensation, then separated from each other by fractional distillation or selective reduction. Uranium hexafluoride and technetium hexafluoride have very similar boiling points and vapor pressures, which makes complete separation more difficult.

Many of the fission products volatilized are the same ones volatilized in non-fluorinated, higher-temperature volatilization, such as iodine, tellurium and molybdenum; notable differences are that technetium is volatilized, but caesium is not.

Some transuranium elements such as plutonium, neptunium and americium can form volatile fluorides, but these compounds are not stable when the fluorine partial pressure is decreased. Most of the plutonium and some of the uranium will initially remain in ash which drops to the bottom of the flame fluorinator. The plutonium-uranium ratio in the ash may even approximate the composition needed for fast neutron reactor fuel. Further fluorination of the ash can remove all the uranium, neptunium, and plutonium as volatile fluorides; however, some other minor actinides may not form volatile fluorides and instead remain with the alkaline fission products. Some noble metals may not form fluorides at all, but remain in metallic form; however ruthenium hexafluoride is relatively stable and volatile.

Distillation of the residue at higher temperatures can separate lower-boiling transition metal fluorides and alkali metal (Cs, Rb) fluorides from higher-boiling lanthanide and alkaline earth metal (Sr, Ba) and yttrium fluorides. The temperatures involved are much higher, but can be lowered somewhat by distilling in a vacuum. If a carrier salt like lithium fluoride or sodium fluoride is being used as a solvent, high-temperature distillation is a way to separate the carrier salt for reuse.

Molten salt reactor designs carry out fluoride volatility reprocessing continuously or at frequent intervals. The goal is to return actinides to the molten fuel mixture for eventual fission, while removing fission products that are neutron poisons, or that can be more securely stored outside the reactor core while awaiting eventual transfer to permanent storage.

==== Chloride volatility and solubility ====
Many of the elements that form volatile high-valence fluorides will also form volatile high-valence chlorides. Chlorination and distillation is another possible method for separation. The sequence of separation may differ usefully from the sequence for fluorides; for example, zirconium tetrachloride and tin tetrachloride have relatively low boiling points of 331 °C (628 °F) and 114.1 °C (237.4 °F). Chlorination has even been proposed as a method for removing zirconium fuel cladding, instead of mechanical decladding.

Chlorides are likely to be easier than fluorides to later convert back to other compounds, such as oxides.

Chlorides remaining after volatilization may also be separated by solubility in water. Chlorides of alkaline elements like americium, curium, lanthanides, strontium, caesium are more soluble than those of uranium, neptunium, plutonium, and zirconium.

==== Advantages of halogen volatility ====
- Chlorine (and to a lesser extent fluorine) is a readily available industrial chemical that is produced in mass quantity.
- Fractional distillation allows many elements to be separated from each other in a single step or iterative repetition of the same step.
- Uranium will be produced directly as Uranium hexafluoride, the form used in enrichment.
- Many volatile fluorides and chlorides are volatile at relatively moderate temperatures reducing thermal stress. This is especially important as the boiling point of uranium hexafluoride is below that of water, allowing to conserve energy in the separation of high boiling fission products (or their fluorides) from one another as this can take place in the absence of uranium, which makes up the bulk of the mass.
- Some fluorides and chlorides melt at relatively low temperatures allowing a "liquid phase separation" if desired. Those low melting salts could be further processed by molten salt electrolysis.
- Fluorides and chlorides differ in water solubility depending on the cation. This can be used to separate them by aqueous solution. However, some fluorides violently react with water, which has to be taken into account.

==== Disadvantages of halogen volatility ====
- Many compounds of fluorine or chlorine as well as the native elements themselves are toxic, corrosive and react violently with air, water or both.
- Uranium hexafluoride and Technetium hexafluoride have very similar boiling points (329.6 K (56.5 °C; 133.6 °F) and 328.4 K (55.3 °C; 131.4 °F) respectively), making it hard to completely separate them from one another by distillation.
- Fractional distillation as used in petroleum refining requires large facilities and huge amounts of energy. To process thousands of tons of uranium would require smaller facilities than processing billions of tons of petroleum — however, unlike petroleum refineries, the entire process would have to take place inside radiation shielding and there would have to be provisions made to prevent leaks of volatile, poisonous and radioactive fluorides.
- Plutonium hexafluoride boils at 335 K (62 °C; 143 °F) this means that any facility capable of separating uranium hexafluoride from Technetium hexafluoride is capable of separating plutonium hexafluoride from either, raising proliferation concerns.
- The presence of alpha emitters induces some (α,n) reactions in fluorine, producing both radioactive ^{22}Na and neutrons. This effect can be reduced by separating alpha emitters and fluorine as fast as feasible. Interactions between chlorine's two stable isotopes ^{35}Cl and ^{37}Cl on the one hand and alpha particles on the other are of lesser concern as they do not have as high a cross section and do not produce neutrons or long lived radionuclides.
- If carbon is present in the spent fuel it'll form halogenated hydrocarbons which are extremely potent greenhouse gases, and hard to chemically decompose. Some of those are toxic as well.

=== Radioanalytical separations ===
To determine the distribution of radioactive metals for analytical purposes, Solvent Impregnated Resins (SIRs) can be used. SIRs are porous particles, which contain an extractant inside their pores. This approach avoids the liquid-liquid separation step required in conventional liquid-liquid extraction. For the preparation of SIRs for radioanalytical separations, organic Amberlite XAD-4 or XAD-7 can be used. Possible extractants are e.g. trihexyltetradecylphosphonium chloride(CYPHOS IL-101) or N,N0-dialkyl-N,N0-diphenylpyridine-2,6-dicarboxyamides (R-PDA; R = butyl, octy I, decyl, dodecyl).

== Economics ==
The relative economics of reprocessing-waste disposal and interim storage-direct disposal was the focus of much debate over the first decade of the 2000s. Studies have modeled the total fuel cycle costs of a reprocessing-recycling system based on one-time recycling of plutonium in existing thermal reactors (as opposed to the proposed breeder reactor cycle) and compare this to the total costs of an open fuel cycle with direct disposal. The range of results produced by these studies is very wide, but all agreed that under then-current economic conditions the reprocessing-recycle option is the more costly one. While the uranium market – particularly its short term fluctuations – has only a minor impact on the cost of electricity from nuclear power, long-term trends in the uranium market do significantly affect the economics of nuclear reprocessing. If uranium prices were to rise and remain consistently high, "stretching the fuel supply" via MOX fuel, breeder reactors or even the thorium fuel cycle could become more attractive. However, if uranium prices remain low, reprocessing will remain less attractive.

If reprocessing is undertaken only to reduce the radioactivity level of spent fuel it should be taken into account that spent nuclear fuel becomes less radioactive over time. After 40 years its radioactivity drops by 99.9%, though it still takes over a thousand years for the level of radioactivity to approach that of natural uranium. However the level of transuranic elements, including plutonium-239, remains high for over 100,000 years, so if not reused as nuclear fuel, then those elements need secure disposal because of nuclear proliferation reasons as well as radiation hazard.

On 25 October 2011 a commission of the Japanese Atomic Energy Commission revealed during a meeting calculations about the costs of recycling nuclear fuel for power generation. These costs could be twice the costs of direct geological disposal of spent fuel: the cost of extracting plutonium and handling spent fuel was estimated at 1.98 to 2.14 yen per kilowatt-hour of electricity generated. Discarding the spent fuel as waste would cost only 1 to 1.35 yen per kilowatt-hour.

In July 2004 Japanese newspapers reported that the Japanese Government had estimated the costs of disposing radioactive waste, contradicting claims four months earlier that no such estimates had been made. The cost of non-reprocessing options was estimated to be between a quarter and a third ($5.5–7.9 billion) of the cost of reprocessing ($24.7 billion). At the end of the year 2011 it became clear that Masaya Yasui, who had been director of the Nuclear Power Policy Planning Division in 2004, had instructed his subordinate in April 2004 to conceal the data. The fact that the data were deliberately concealed obliged the ministry to re-investigate the case and to reconsider whether to punish the officials involved.

== List of sites ==
Country	Reprocessing site	Fuel type	Procedure	Reprocessing capacity tHM/yr	Commissioning or operating period
Belgium	Mol	LWR, MTR (Material test reactor)		80	1966–1974
China	intermediate pilot plant			60–100	1968-early 1970s
China	Plant 404			50	2004
China, Gansu Province	Gansu Nuclear Technology Industrial Park, Jinta				under construction (2030)
Germany	Karlsruhe, WAK	LWR		35	1971–1990
France	Marcoule, UP 1	Military		1200	1958-1997
France	Marcoule, CEA APM	FBR	PUREX DIAMEX SANEX	6	1988–present
France	La Hague, UP 2	LWR	PUREX	900	1967–1974
France	La Hague, UP 2–400	LWR	PUREX	400	1976–1990
France	La Hague, UP 2–800	LWR	PUREX	800	1990
France	La Hague, UP 3	LWR	PUREX	800	1990
UK	Windscale, B204	Magnox, LWR	BUTEX	750	1956–1962, 1969-1973
UK	Sellafield, Magnox Reprocessing Plant	Magnox, LWR, FBR	PUREX	1500	1964-2022
UK	Dounreay	FBR		8	1980
UK	THORP	AGR, LWR	PUREX	900	1994-2018
Italy	Rotondella	Thorium		5	1968 (shutdown)
India	Trombay	Military	PUREX	60	1965
India	Tarapur	PHWR	PUREX	100	1982
India	Kalpakkam	PHWR and FBTR	PUREX	100	1998
India	Tarapur	PHWR		100	2011
Israel	Dimona	Military		60–100	~1960–present
Japan	Tokai	LWR		210	1977-2006
Japan	Rokkasho	LWR		800	under construction (2024)
Pakistan	New Labs, Rawalpindi	Military/Plutonium/Thorium		80	1982–present
Pakistan	Khushab Nuclear Complex, Atomic City of Pakistan	HWR/Military/Tritium		22 kg	1986–present
Russia	Mayak Plant B	Military		400	1948-196?
Russia	Mayak Plant BB, RT-1	LWR	PUREX + Np separation	400	1978
Russia	Tomsk-7 Radiochemical Plant	Military		6000	1956
Russia	Zheleznogorsk (Krasnoyarsk-26)	Military		3500	1964–~2010
Russia	Zheleznogorsk, RT-2	VVER		800	under construction (2030)
USA, WA	Hanford Site	Military	bismuth phosphate, REDOX, PUREX		1944–1988
USA, SC	Savannah River Site	Military/LWR/HWR/Tritium	PUREX, REDOX, THOREX, Np separation	5000	1952–2002
USA, NY	West Valley	LWR	PUREX	300	1966–1972
USA, SC	Barnwell	LWR	PUREX	1500	Never permitted to operate (Note: Construction completed in 1976)
USA, ID	INL	LWR	PUREX	–	

== See also ==
- Nuclear fuel cycle
- Breeder reactor
- Nuclear fusion-fission hybrid
- Spent nuclear fuel shipping cask
- Taylor Wilson's nuclear waste-fired small reactor
- Global Nuclear Energy Partnership announced February 2006
