= Spent nuclear fuel =

Nuclear fuel that has been irradiated in a nuclear reactor

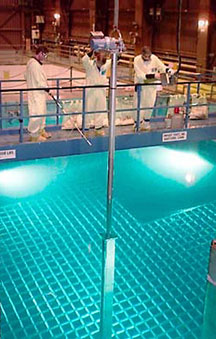
Spent fuel pool at a nuclear power plant

Spent nuclear fuel, occasionally called used nuclear fuel, is nuclear fuel that has been irradiated in a nuclear reactor (usually at a nuclear power plant). It is no longer useful in sustaining a nuclear reaction in an ordinary thermal-neutron reactor and, depending on its point along the nuclear fuel cycle, it will have different isotopic constituents than when it started.

Nuclear fuel rods become progressively more radioactive (and less thermally useful) due to neutron activation as they are fissioned, or "burnt", in the reactor. A fresh rod of low-enriched uranium pellets (which can be safely handled with gloved hands) will become a highly lethal gamma emitter after 1–2 years of core irradiation, unsafe to approach unless under many feet of water shielding. This makes their invariable accumulation and safe temporary storage in spent fuel pools a prime source of high-level radioactive waste and a major ongoing issue for future permanent disposal.

== Nature of spent fuel ==
=== Nanomaterial properties ===
In the oxide fuel, intense temperature gradients exist that cause fission products to migrate. The zirconium tends to move to the centre of the fuel pellet where the temperature is highest, while the lower-boiling fission products move to the edge of the pellet. The pellet is likely to contain many small bubble-like pores that form during use; the fission product xenon migrates to these voids. Some of this xenon will then decay to form caesium, hence many of these bubbles contain a large concentration of ^{135}Cs.

In the case of mixed oxide (MOX) fuel, the xenon tends to diffuse out of the plutonium-rich areas of the fuel, and it is then trapped in the surrounding uranium dioxide. The neodymium tends to not be mobile.

Also metallic particles of an alloy of Mo-Tc-Ru-Pd tend to form in the fuel. Other solids form at the boundary between the uranium dioxide grains, but the majority of the fission products remain in the uranium dioxide as solid solutions. A paper describing a method of making a non-radioactive "uranium active" simulation of spent oxide fuel exists.

=== Fission products ===
Spent nuclear fuel contains 3% by mass of fission products of ^{235}U and ^{239}Pu (also indirect products in the decay chain); these are considered radioactive waste or may be separated further for various industrial and medical uses. The fission products include every element from zinc through to the lanthanides; much of the fission yield is concentrated in two peaks, one in the second transition row (Zr, Mo, Tc, Ru, Rh, Pd, Ag) and the other later in the periodic table (I, Xe, Cs, Ba, La, Ce, Nd). Many of the fission products are either non-radioactive or only short-lived radioisotopes, but a considerable number are medium to long-lived radioisotopes such as ^{90}Sr, ^{137}Cs, ^{99}Tc and ^{129}I. Research has been conducted by several different countries into segregating the rare isotopes in fission waste including the "fission platinoids" (Ru, Rh, Pd) and silver (Ag) as a way of offsetting the cost of reprocessing; this is not currently being done commercially.

The fission products can modify the thermal properties of the uranium dioxide; the lanthanide oxides tend to lower the thermal conductivity of the fuel, while the metallic nanoparticles slightly increase the thermal conductivity of the fuel.

==== Table of chemical data ====
The chemical forms of fission products in uranium dioxide
Element	Gas	Metal	Oxide	Solid solution
Br Kr	Yes	-	-	-
Rb	Yes	-	Yes	-
Sr	-	-	Yes	Yes
Y	-	-	-	Yes
Zr	-	-	Yes	Yes
Nb	-	-	Yes	-
Mo	-	Yes	Yes	-
Tc Ru Rh Pd Ag Cd In Sb	-	Yes	-	-
Te	Yes	Yes	Yes	Yes
I Xe	Yes	-	-	-
Cs	Yes	-	Yes	-
Ba	-	-	Yes	Yes
La Ce Pr Nd Pm Sm Eu	-	-	-	Yes

=== Plutonium ===
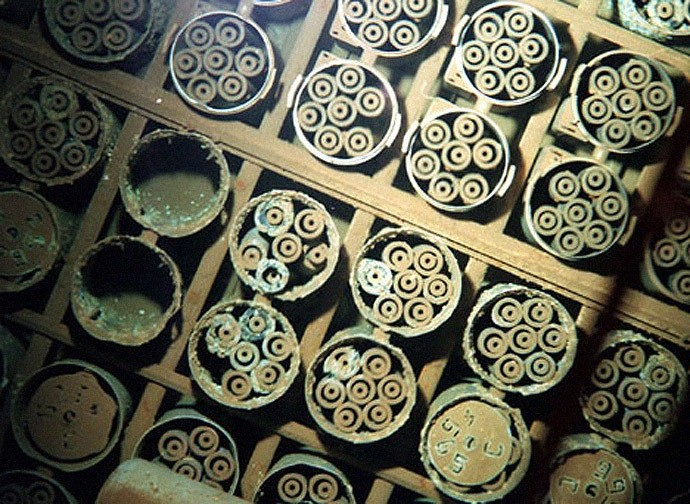
Spent nuclear fuel stored underwater and uncapped at the Hanford site in Washington, US

About 1% of the mass is ^{239}Pu and ^{240}Pu resulting from conversion of ^{238}U, which may be considered either as a useful byproduct, or as dangerous and inconvenient waste. One of the main concerns regarding nuclear proliferation is to prevent this plutonium from being used by states, other than those already established as nuclear weapons states, to produce nuclear weapons. If the reactor has been used normally, the plutonium is reactor-grade, not weapons-grade: it contains more than 19% ^{240}Pu and less than 80% ^{239}Pu, which makes it not ideal for making bombs. If the irradiation period has been short then the plutonium is weapons-grade (more than 93%).

=== Uranium ===
96% of the mass is the remaining uranium: most of the original ^{238}U and a little ^{235}U. Usually ^{235}U would be less than 0.8% of the mass along with 0.4% ^{236}U.

Reprocessed uranium will contain ^{236}U, which is not found in nature; this is one isotope that can be used as a fingerprint for spent reactor fuel.

If using a thorium fuel to produce fissile ^{233}U, the SNF (Spent Nuclear Fuel) will have ^{233}U, with a half-life of 159,200 years (unless this uranium is removed from the spent fuel by a chemical process). The presence of ^{233}U will affect the long-term radioactive decay of the spent fuel. If compared with MOX fuel, the activity around one million years in the cycles with thorium will be higher due to the presence of the not fully decayed ^{233}U.

For natural uranium fuel, fissile component starts at 0.7% ^{235}U concentration in natural uranium. At discharge, total fissile component is still 0.5% (0.2% ^{235}U, 0.3% fissile ^{239}Pu, ^{241}Pu). Fuel is discharged not because fissile material is fully used-up, but because the neutron-absorbing fission products have built up and the fuel becomes significantly less able to sustain a nuclear reaction.

Some natural uranium fuels use chemically active cladding, such as Magnox, and need to be reprocessed because long-term storage and disposal is difficult.

=== Minor actinides ===
Spent reactor fuel contains traces of the minor actinides. These are actinides other than uranium and plutonium and include neptunium, americium and curium. The amount formed depends greatly upon the nature of the fuel used and the conditions under which it was used. For instance, the use of MOX fuel (^{239}Pu in a ^{238}U matrix) is likely to lead to the production of more ^{241}Am and heavier nuclides than a uranium/thorium based fuel (^{233}U in a ^{232}Th matrix).

For highly enriched fuels used in marine reactors and research reactors, the isotope inventory will vary based on in-core fuel management and reactor operating conditions.

== Spent fuel decay heat ==
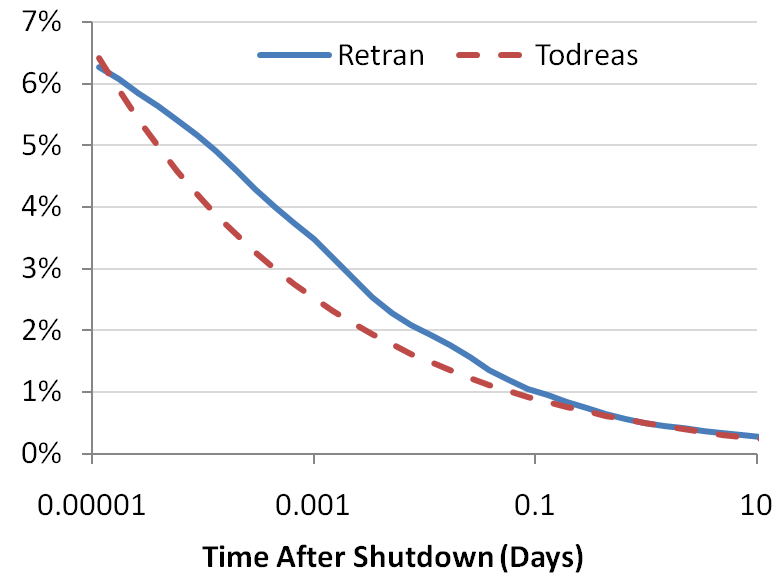
Decay heat as fraction of full power for a reactor SCRAMed from full power at time 0, using two different correlations

When a nuclear reactor has been shut down and the nuclear fission chain reaction has ceased, a significant amount of heat will still be produced in the fuel due to the beta decay of fission products. For this reason, at the moment of reactor shutdown, decay heat will be about 7% of the previous core power if the reactor has had a long and steady power history. About 1 hour after shutdown, the decay heat will be about 1.5% of the previous core power. After a day, the decay heat falls to 0.4%, and after a week it will be 0.2%. The decay heat production rate will continue to slowly decrease over time.

Spent fuel that has been removed from a reactor is ordinarily stored in a water-filled spent fuel pool for a year or more (in some sites 10 to 20 years) in order to cool it and provide shielding from its radioactivity. Practical spent fuel pool designs generally do not rely on passive cooling but rather require that the water be actively pumped through heat exchangers. If there is a prolonged interruption of active cooling due to emergency situations, the water in the spent fuel pools may therefore boil off, possibly resulting in radioactive elements being released into the atmosphere.

== Fuel composition and long term radioactivity ==
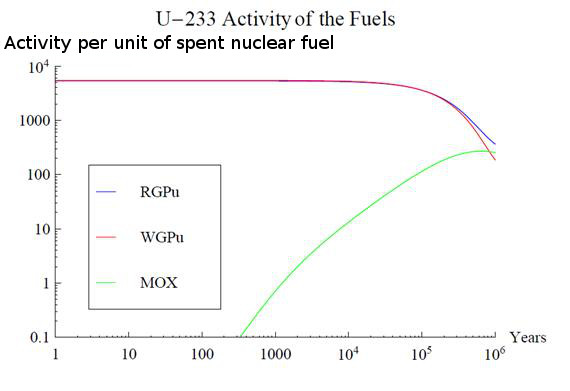
Activity of U-233 for three fuel types. In the case of MOX, the U-233 increases for the first 650,000 years as it is produced by decay of Np-237 that was created in the reactor by absorption of neutrons by U-235.

Total activity for three fuel types. In region 1 we have radiation from short-lived nuclides, and in region 2 from Sr-90 and Cs-137. On the far right we see the decay of Np-237 and U-233.

The use of different fuels in nuclear reactors results in different SNF composition, with varying activity curves.

Long-lived radioactive waste from the back end of the fuel cycle is especially relevant when designing a complete waste management plan for SNF. When looking at long-term radioactive decay, the actinides in the SNF have a significant influence due to their characteristically long half-lives. Depending on what a nuclear reactor is fueled with, the actinide composition in the SNF will be different.

An example of this effect is the use of nuclear fuels with thorium. Th-232 is a fertile material that can undergo a neutron capture reaction and two beta minus decays, resulting in the production of fissile U-233. Its radioactive decay will strongly influence the long-term activity curve of the SNF around a million years. A comparison of the activity associated to U-233 for three different SNF types can be seen in the figure on the top right. The burnt fuels are Thorium with Reactor-Grade Plutonium (RGPu), Thorium with Weapons-Grade Plutonium (WGPu) and Mixed Oxide fuel (MOX, no thorium). For RGPu and WGPu, the initial amount of U-233 and its decay around a million years can be seen. This has an effect in the total activity curve of the three fuel types. The initial absence of U-233 and its daughter products in the MOX fuel results in a lower activity in region 3 of the figure on the bottom right, whereas for RGPu and WGPu the curve is maintained higher due to the presence of U-233 that has not fully decayed. Nuclear reprocessing can remove the actinides from the spent fuel so they can be used or destroyed (see Long-lived fission product#Actinides).

== Spent fuel corrosion ==
=== Noble metal nanoparticles and hydrogen ===
According to the work of corrosion electrochemist David W. Shoesmith, the nanoparticles of Mo-Tc-Ru-Pd have a strong effect on the corrosion of uranium dioxide fuel. For instance his work suggests that when hydrogen (H_{2}) concentration is high (due to the anaerobic corrosion of the steel waste can), the oxidation of hydrogen at the nanoparticles will exert a protective effect on the uranium dioxide. This effect can be thought of as an example of protection by a sacrificial anode, where instead of a metal anode reacting and dissolving it is the hydrogen gas that is consumed.

== Storage, treatment, and disposal ==
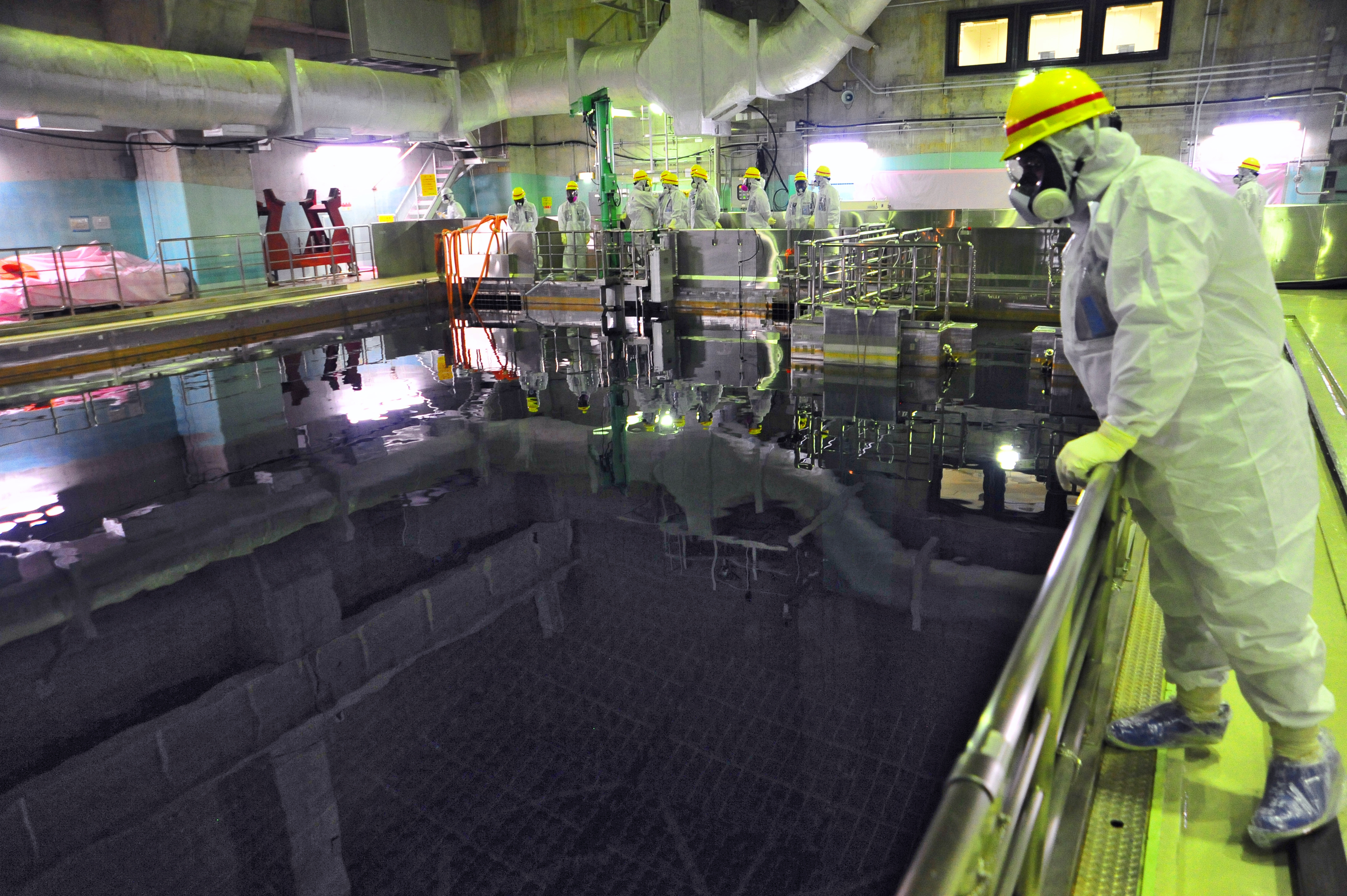
Spent fuel pool at TEPCO's Fukushima Daiichi Nuclear Power Plant on 27 November 2013

Spent nuclear fuel is stored either in spent fuel pools (SFPs) or in dry casks. In the United States, SFPs and casks containing spent fuel are located either directly on nuclear power plant sites or on Independent Spent Fuel Storage Installations (ISFSIs). ISFSIs can be adjacent to a nuclear power plant site, or may reside away-from-reactor (AFR ISFSI). The vast majority of ISFSIs store spent fuel in dry casks. The Morris Operation is currently the only ISFSI with a spent fuel pool in the United States.

Nuclear reprocessing can separate spent fuel into various combinations of reprocessed uranium, plutonium, minor actinides, fission products, remnants of zirconium or steel cladding, activation products, and the reagents or solidifiers introduced in the reprocessing itself. If these constituent portions of spent fuel were reused, and additional wastes that may come as a byproduct of reprocessing are limited, reprocessing could ultimately reduce the volume of waste that needs to be disposed.

Alternatively, the intact spent nuclear fuel can be directly disposed of as high-level radioactive waste. The United States originally had planned disposal in deep geological formations, such as the Yucca Mountain nuclear waste repository, where it would be shielded and packaged to prevent its migration to humans' immediate environment for thousands of years. On March 5, 2009, however, Energy Secretary Steven Chu told a Senate hearing that "the Yucca Mountain site no longer was viewed as an option for storing reactor waste." As of 2019, the status of the Yucca Mountain site is in political limbo.

Geological disposal has been approved in Finland, using the KBS-3 process.

In Switzerland, the Federal Council approved in 2008, the plan for the deep geological repository for radioactive waste.

=== Remediation ===
Algae has shown selectivity for strontium in studies, where most plants used in bioremediation have not shown selectivity between calcium and strontium, often becoming saturated with calcium, which is present in greater quantities in nuclear waste. Strontium-90 is a radioactive byproduct produced by nuclear reactors used in nuclear power. It is a component of nuclear waste and spent nuclear fuel. The half-life is long, around 30 years, and is classified as high-level waste.

Researchers have looked at the bioaccumulation of strontium by Scenedesmus spinosus (algae) in simulated wastewater. The study claims a highly selective biosorption capacity for strontium of S. spinosus, suggesting that it may be appropriate for use of nuclear wastewater. A study of the pond alga Closterium moniliferum using non-radioactive strontium found that varying the ratio of barium to strontium in water improved strontium selectivity.

== Risks ==
Spent nuclear fuel stays a radiation hazard for extended periods of time with half-lifes as high as 24,000 years. For example 10 years after removal from a reactor, the surface dose rate for a typical spent fuel assembly still exceeds 10,000 rem/hour—far greater than the fatal whole-body dose for humans of about 500 rem received all at once.

There is debate over whether spent fuel stored in a pool is susceptible to incidents such as earthquakes or terrorist attacks that could potentially result in a release of radiation.

In the rare occurrence of a fuel failure during normal operation, the primary coolant can enter the element. Visual techniques are normally used for the postirradiation inspection of fuel bundles.

Since the September 11 attacks, the Nuclear Regulatory Commission has instituted a series of rules mandating that all fuel pools be impervious to natural disaster and terrorist attack. As a result, used fuel pools are encased in a steel liner and thick concrete, and are regularly inspected to ensure resilience to earthquakes, tornadoes, hurricanes, and seiches.

== See also ==
- Nuclear power
- Spent nuclear fuel shipping cask
- Nuclear meltdown
