= Minor actinide =

Category of elements in spent nuclear fuel

Transmutation flow between ^{238}Pu and ^{244}Cm in LWR. Fission percentage is 100 minus shown percentages. Total rate of transmutation varies greatly by nuclide.^{245}Cm–^{248}Cm are long-lived with negligible decay.

A minor actinide is an actinide, other than uranium or plutonium, found in spent nuclear fuel. The minor actinides include neptunium (element 93), americium (element 95), curium (element 96), berkelium (element 97), californium (element 98), einsteinium (element 99), and fermium (element 100). The most important isotopes of these elements in spent nuclear fuel are neptunium-237, americium-241, americium-243, curium-242 through -248, and californium-249 through -252.

Plutonium and the minor actinides will be responsible for the bulk of the radiotoxicity and heat generation of spent nuclear fuel in the long term (300 to 20,000 years in the future).

The plutonium from a power reactor tends to have a greater amount of plutonium-241 than the plutonium generated by the lower burnup operations designed to create weapons-grade plutonium. Because the reactor-grade plutonium contains so much ^{241}Pu, the presence of ^{241}Am makes the plutonium less suitable for making a nuclear weapon. The ingrowth of americium in plutonium is one of the methods for identifying the origin of an unknown sample of plutonium and the time since it was last separated chemically from the americium.

Americium is commonly used in industry as both an alpha particle source and as a low photon-energy gamma radiation source. For example, it is commonly used in smoke detectors. Americium can be formed by neutron capture of ^{239}Pu and ^{240}Pu, forming ^{241}Pu which then beta decays to ^{241}Am. In general, as the energy of the neutrons increases, the ratio of the fission cross section to the neutron capture cross section changes in favour of fission. Hence, if MOX is used in a thermal reactor such as a boiling water reactor (BWR) or pressurized water reactor (PWR) then more americium can be expected to be found in the spent fuel than in that from a fast neutron reactor.

Some of the minor actinides have been found in fallout from bomb tests. See Actinides in the environment for details.

Transuranics in LWR spent fuel (burnup 55 GWd_{th}/T) and mean neutron consumption via fissionNegative numbers mean net neutron producer
Isotope	Fraction	D_{LWR}	D_{fast}	D_{superthermal}
^{237}Np	0.0539	1.12	−0.59	−0.46
^{238}Pu	0.0364	0.17	−1.36	−0.13
^{239}Pu	0.451	−0.67	−1.46	−1.07
^{240}Pu	0.206	0.44	−0.96	0.14
^{241}Pu	0.121	−0.56	−1.24	−0.86
^{242}Pu	0.0813	1.76	−0.44	1.12
^{241}Am	0.0242	1.12	−0.62	−0.54
^{242m}Am	0.000088	0.15	−1.36	−1.53
^{243}Am	0.0179	0.82	−0.60	0.21
^{243}Cm	0.00011	−1.90	−2.13	−1.63
^{244}Cm	0.00765	−0.15	−1.39	−0.48
^{245}Cm	0.000638	−1.48	−2.51	−1.37
Weighted sum		−0.03	−1.16	−0.51
