= Deep Fission =

American nuclear-energy company

Deep Fission, Inc.
- Type: Public
- Traded as: Nasdaq: FISN
- Industry: Nuclear power; Small modular reactor
- Founded: 2023; 3 years ago; Berkeley, California, U.S.
- Founders: Elizabeth Muller; Richard A. Muller
- Headquarters: Berkeley, California, U.S.
- Key people: Elizabeth Muller (CEO); Richard A. Muller (CTO)
- Products: Gravity Reactor
- Website: www.deepfission.com

Deep Fission, Inc. is an American nuclear-energy company based in Berkeley, California. Founded in 2023 by Elizabeth Muller and her father, physicist Richard A. Muller, the company is developing an underground reactor concept it calls the Gravity Reactor, which it describes as a pressurized water reactor intended for emplacement in a deep borehole approximately one mile (1.6 km) below the surface. In August 2025, the U.S. Department of Energy (DOE) selected Deep Fission for its Reactor Pilot Program, a pathway for testing advanced reactors outside the national laboratories. It is a development-stage company and had not built or licensed a reactor as of 2026. Deep Fission became an SEC-reporting company through a reverse merger in 2025 and completed an initial public offering in June 2026; its shares trade on the Nasdaq under the ticker symbol FISN.

== History ==
Deep Fission was founded in 2023 by Elizabeth Muller and Richard A. Muller, who had earlier co-founded Deep Isolation, a company developing deep-borehole disposal of nuclear waste; Deep Fission applies a related deep-borehole approach to power generation. The company emerged from stealth in 2024 with a $4 million pre-seed funding round led by Joe Lonsdale's venture capital firm 8VC.

In August 2025, the DOE named Deep Fission among the initial projects selected for its Reactor Pilot Program, an initiative created under Executive Order 14301 that uses DOE authority to expedite testing of advanced reactors outside the national laboratories. The following month, the company became an SEC-reporting company through a reverse merger with Surfside Acquisition Inc. and a concurrent $30 million private placement, and in December 2025 it selected the Great Plains Industrial Park in Parsons, Kansas, as its pilot site and held a groundbreaking ceremony.

In early 2026, the company raised $80 million in a private placement and formed a strategic relationship with Blue Owl Capital's Real Assets platform, whose managed fund participated in the round, with Goldman Sachs acting as the company's financial advisor; it also agreed to purchase low-enriched uranium from Urenco USA for its demonstration and early commercial phases, and in March began drilling its first data-acquisition well at the Kansas site.

In May 2026, Deep Fission filed for an initial public offering on Nasdaq, initially seeking about $157 million at a valuation of roughly $1.66 billion before reducing the offering the following month. The offering priced on June 17, 2026, at $16 per share, the low end of the revised range, raising $40 million in gross proceeds, and the company's shares began trading on the Nasdaq Global Market on June 18, 2026, under the ticker symbol FISN, with Benchmark and Seaport Global as joint book-running managers. In its offering documents, the company disclosed that it had not generated revenue and that its independent auditors had raised substantial doubt about its ability to continue as a going concern.

== Technology ==
According to the company's securities filings and trade coverage, the Gravity Reactor is based on conventional pressurized water reactor technology, uses low-enriched uranium fuel, and targets an output of up to 8 MWe per reactor in its initial configuration and up to 15 MWe in a planned larger configuration, with multiple reactors deployable in clustered boreholes at a single site. The company states that the design is intended to use the surrounding geology and the hydrostatic pressure of the borehole as part of the plant's containment and operating conditions, rather than a conventional surface containment structure. The company's final IPO prospectus states that its intellectual-property portfolio includes issued patents and pending patent applications relating to reactor configuration, deep subsurface emplacement, drilling and casing techniques, thermal-hydraulic performance, and instrumentation and monitoring. In a 2025 article, The Economist examined the concept and described it as an attempt to address several of nuclear power's difficulties at once: placing the reactor at the bottom of a water-filled shaft about a mile deep is intended to lower the chance of a radioactive leak, simplify the handling of spent fuel, and remove much of the surface equipment that makes conventional plants costly to build and run. The magazine characterized the design as an elegant idea that remains unproven in practice.

== Regulatory status and community response ==
A test authorization under the DOE Reactor Pilot Program is distinct from the commercial reactor license that would be required from the Nuclear Regulatory Commission (NRC) for ordinary operation; Deep Fission began pre-application engagement with the NRC in 2024. Independent nuclear engineers quoted in energy-industry press have questioned whether siting and licensing an underground reactor will prove as straightforward or inexpensive as the company anticipates.

Local reporting noted that commercial operation at the Kansas site would depend on regulatory approvals and community input. In July 2026, The Wall Street Journal reported that the project had divided residents of Parsons: some local leaders welcomed it as an economic opportunity, while a residents' group formed to oppose it, citing concerns about environmental oversight and water safety, and nuclear watchdog groups and a coalition of state attorneys general challenged the federal government's expedited environmental-review process for the pilot program. The company has said the reactor would sit well below groundwater aquifers and that it plans to open a local office to answer residents' questions.

== Founders and technical background ==
Elizabeth Muller, the chief executive officer, previously was chief executive of Deep Isolation and executive director of the climate-science organization Berkeley Earth. Richard A. Muller, the chief technology officer, is a physicist and professor emeritus at the University of California, Berkeley; a MacArthur Fellow, a recipient of the Breakthrough Prize, and a member of the American Academy of Arts and Sciences.

== See also ==
- Small modular reactor
- Oklo Inc.
- X-energy
- Deep borehole disposal
- Nuclear power in the United States
