= Ocean disposal of radioactive waste =

Method to dispose of nuclear and radioactive waste

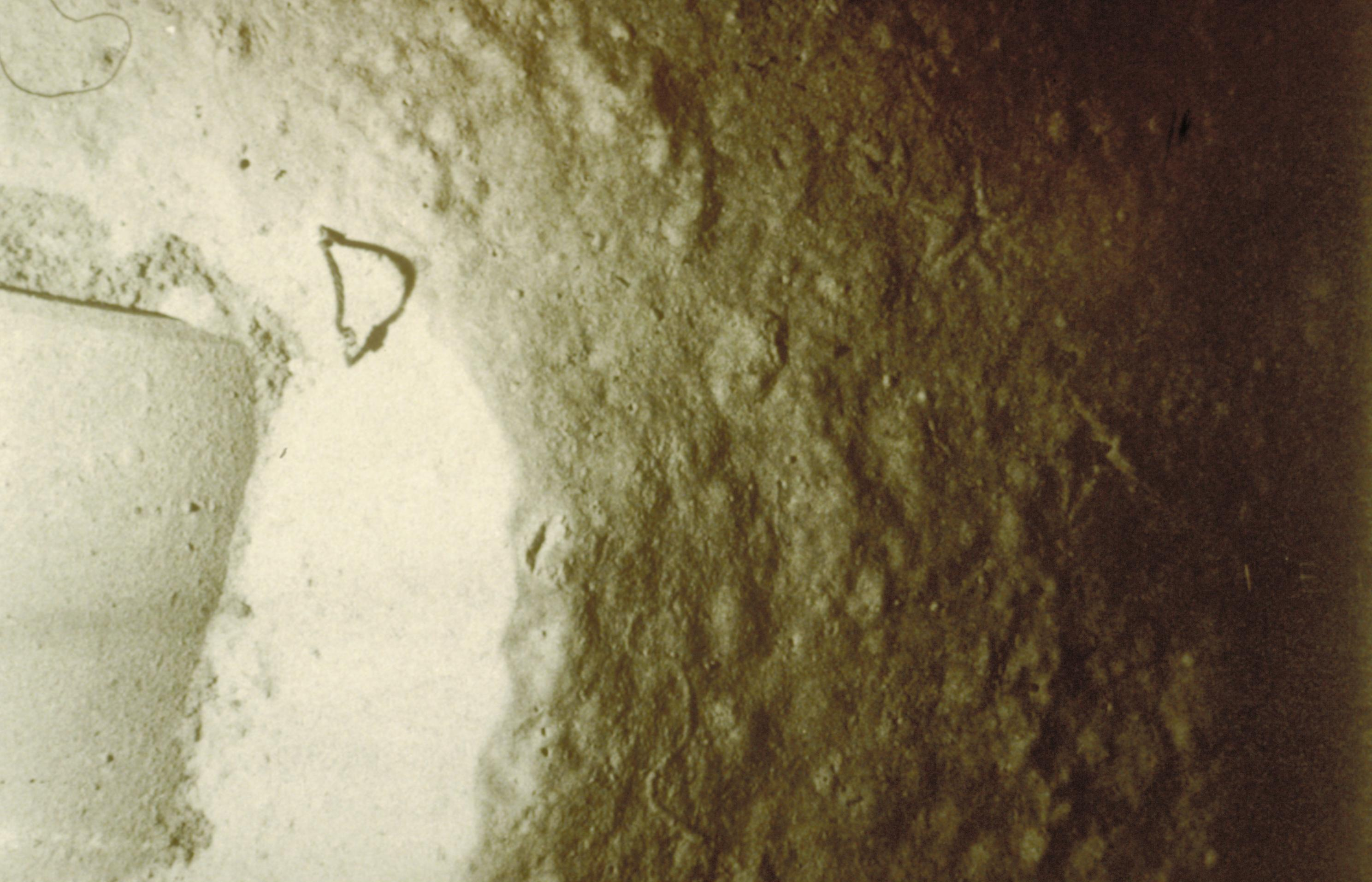
Radioactive waste container located in the North-East Atlantic dumping zone (NEA zone).

From 1946 through 1993, thirteen countries used ocean disposal or ocean dumping as a method to dispose of nuclear/radioactive waste with an approximation of 200,000 tons sourcing mainly from the medical, research and nuclear industry.

The waste materials included both liquids and solids housed in various containers, as well as reactor vessels, with and without spent or damaged nuclear fuel. Since 1993, ocean disposal has been banned by international treaties. (London Convention (1972), Basel Convention, MARPOL 73/78). There has only been the disposal of low level radioactive waste (LLW) thus far in terms of ocean dumping as high level waste has been strictly prohibited.

Ocean floor disposal (or sub-seabed disposal)—a more deliberate method of delivering radioactive waste to the ocean floor and depositing it into the seabed—was studied by the United Kingdom and Sweden, but never implemented.

== History ==
Data are from IAEA-TECDOC-1105, pages 3–4.

- 1946 First dumping operation at Northeast Pacific Ocean (about 80 km off the coast of California)
- 1957 First IAEA Advisory Group Meeting on Radioactive Waste Disposal into the Sea
- 1958 First United Nations Conference on the Law of the Sea (UNCLOS I)
- 1964 On the 21 April, a satellite failed carrying a SNAP-9A radiothermal generator. 17,000 Ci (630 TBq) plutonium metal fuel burned up.
- 1972 Adoption of the Convention on the Prevention of Marine Pollution by Dumping of Wastes and Other Matter (London Convention 1972)
- 1975 The London Convention 1972 entered into force (Prohibition of dumping of high level radioactive waste.)
- 1978 On the 24 January a satellite named Kosmos 954 failed. It was powered by a liquid sodium–potassium thermionic converter driven by a nuclear reactor containing around 50 kilograms (110 lb) of uranium-235.
- 1983 Moratorium on low-level waste dumping
- 1988 Assessing the Impact of Deep Sea Disposal of Low-level Radioactive Waste on Living Marine Resources. IAEA Technical Reports Series No. 288
- 1990 Estimation of Radiation Risks at Low Dose. IAEA-TECDOC-557
- 1993 Russia reported the dumping of high level nuclear waste including spent fuel by former USSR.
- 1994 (February 20) Total prohibition of disposal at sea came into force

== 1946–1993 ==
Data are from IAEA-TECDOC-1105. Summary of pages 27–120:

Disposal projects attempted to locate ideal dumping sites based on depth, stability and currents, and to treat, solidify and contain the waste. However, some dumping only involved diluting the waste with surface water, or used containers that imploded at depth. Even containers that survived the pressure could physically decay over time.

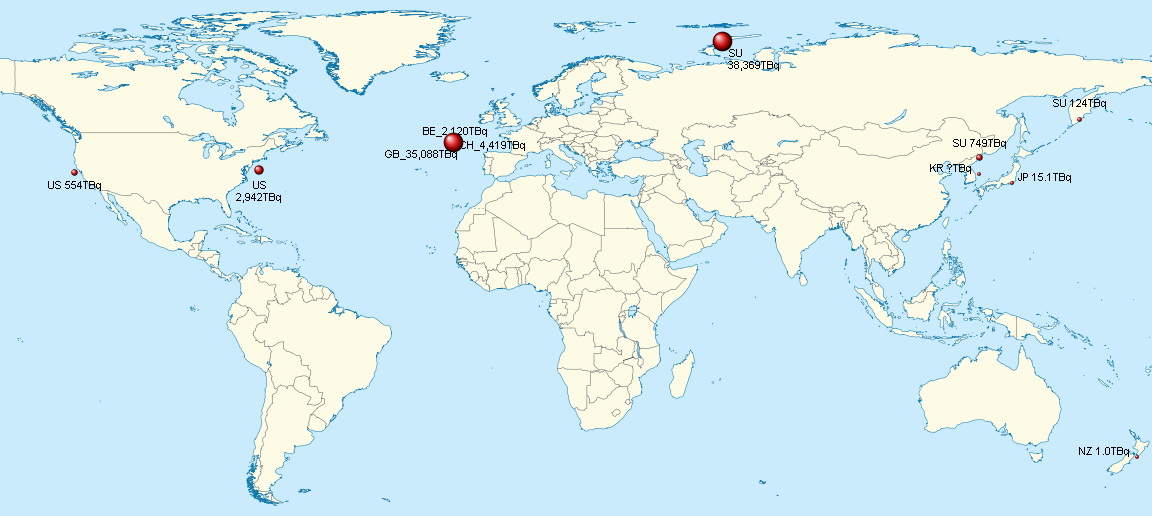
Country total at the major site. SU: Soviet Union (39,243 TBq) and Russia (2.8v TBq), GB: UK (35,088 TBq), CH: Switzerland (4,419 TBq), BE: Belgium (2,120 TBq). US: United States of America (3,496 TBq), JP: Japan (15TBq), KR: South Korea (?TBq), NZ: New Zealand (1+TBq). France (354 TBq), Germany (0.2 TBq), Italy (0.2 TBq), the Netherlands (336 TBq), and Sweden (3.2 TBq) are within the GB marker.

The countries involved – listed in order of total contributions measured in TBq (TBq=10^{12} becquerel) – were the Soviet Union, the United Kingdom, Switzerland, the United States, Belgium, France, the Netherlands, Japan, Sweden, Russia, New Zealand, Germany, Italy and South Korea. Together, they dumped a total of 85,100 TBq (85.1 × 10^{15} Bq) of radioactive waste at over 100 ocean sites, as measured in initial radioactivity at the time of dump.

For comparison:

- Global fallout of nuclear weapon tests – 2,566,087 × 10^{15} Bq.
- 1986 Chernobyl disaster total release – 12,060 × 10^{15} Bq.
- 2011 Fukushima Daiichi nuclear disaster, estimated total 340 × 10^{15} to 780 × 10^{15} Bq, with 80% falling into the Pacific Ocean.
- Fukushima Daiichi nuclear plant cooling water dumped (leaked) to the sea – TEPCO estimate 4.7 × 10^{15} Bq, Japanese Nuclear Safety Commission estimate 15 × 10^{15} Bq, French Nuclear Safety Committee estimate 27 × 10^{15} Bq.
- Naturally occurring Potassium 40 in all oceans – 14,000,000 × 10^{15} Bq.
- One container (net 400 kg) of vitrified high-level radioactive waste has an average radioactivity of 4 × 10^{15} Bq (Max 45 × 10^{15} Bq).

Ocean dumping of radioactive waste 1946–1993
Country	dumped (unit TBq=10^{12} Bq）				period	num of sites, volume, etc.*
Country	Arctic	Atlantic	Pacific	Total	period	num of sites, volume, etc.*
USSR	38,369	0	874	39,243	1959–1992	Arctic 20 sites, 222,000 m^{3} and reactor w or w/o spent fuel; Pacific Ocean (mainly sea of Japan) 12 sites, 145,000 m^{3}
UK	0	35,088	0	35,088	1948–82	NE Atlantic 15 sites, unknown number of containers, 74,052 tons and 18 sites off coast of British isles more than 9.4 TBq
Switzerland	0	4,419	0	4,419	1969–1982	NE Atlantic 3 sites, 7,420 containers, 5,321 tons
USA	0	2,942	554	3,496	1946–70	Mid/NW Atlantic (9), Gulf of Mexico (2) total 11 sites, 34,282 containers, unknown quantity; Mid/NE Pacific Ocean, total of 18 sites, 56,261 containers, ? tones
Belgium	0	2,120	0	2,120	1960–1982	NE Atlantic 6 sites, 55,324 containers, 23,100 tons
France	0	354	0	354	1967–1969	NE Atlantic 2 sites, 46,396 containers, 14,300 tons
Netherlands	0	336	0	336	1967–1982	NE Atlantic 4 sites, 28,428 containers, 19,200 tons
Japan	0	0	15.08	15.08	1955–1969	South of Honshu, 6 sites 15 times, 3,031 containers, 606,000 m^{3}
Sweden	0	3.2	0	3.2	1959,61,69	Baltic sea 1 site, 230 containers, 64 tons; NE Atlantic 1 site, 289.5 containers, 1,080 tons,
Russia	0.7	0	2.1	2.8	1992–93	Arctic 3,066 m^{3}; Pacific Ocean 6,327 m^{3}
New Zealand	0	0	1.04	1.04	1954–1976	East coast of New Zealand, 4 sites, 9 containers, 0.62 m^{3}
Germany	0	0.2	0	0.2	1967	NE Atlantic 1 site once, 480 containers, 185 tons
Italy	0	0.2	0	0.2	1969	NE Atlantic 1 site, 100 containers, 45 tons
South Korea	0	0	no data		1968–1972	Sea of Japan, 1 site 5 times?, 115 containers, 45 tons
Total	38,369	45,262	1,446	85,077		Subtotal of all volume reported is 982,394 m^{3}.
*Some countries report the mass and volume of disposed waste and some just tonnage. The US did not report tonnage or volume of 90,543 containers.

=== Types of waste and packaging ===
Data are from IAEA-TECDOC-1105.

==== Liquid waste ====
- unpackaged and diluted in surface waters
- contained in package but not solidified

==== Solid waste ====
- low level waste like resins, filters, material used for decontamination processes, etc., solidified with cement or bitumen and packaged in metal containers
- unpackaged solid waste, mainly large parts of nuclear installations (steam generators, pumps, lids of reactor pressure vessels, etc.)

==== Reactor vessels ====
- without nuclear fuel
- containing damaged spent nuclear fuel solidified with polymer agent
- special container with damaged spent nuclear fuel (icebreaker Lenin by the former Soviet Union)

Ocean disposal (unit TBq = 10^{12} Bq)
Waste type	Atlantic	Pacific Ocean	Arctic	total	note
Reactors with spent fuel	Nil	Nil	36,876	36,876	
Reactors w/o fuel	1,221	166	143	1,530	
Low level solid	44,043	821	585	45,449	
Low level liquid	<0.001	459	765	1,223	
Total	45,264	1445	38,369	85,078	

=== Dump sites ===
Data are from IAEA-TECDOC-1105. There are three dump sites in the Pacific Ocean.

==== Arctic ====
Mainly at the east coast of Novaya Zemlya at Kara Sea and relatively small proportion at Barents Sea by the Soviet Union. Dumped at 20 sites from 1959 to 1992, total of 222,000 m^{3} including reactors and spent fuel.

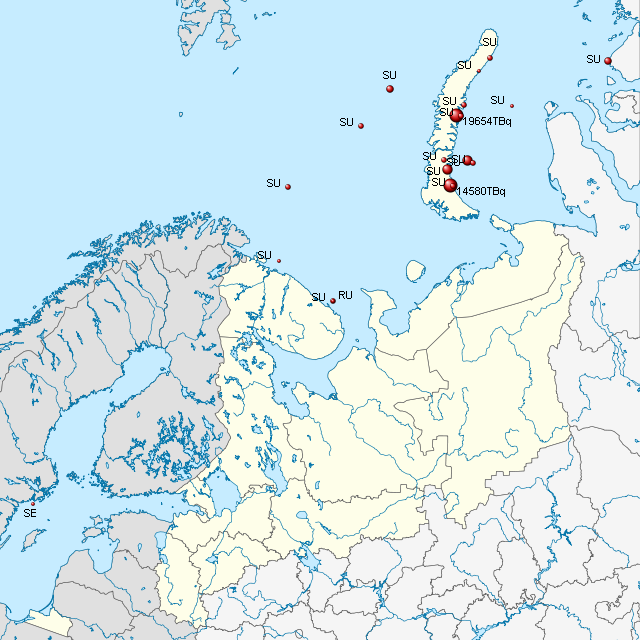
Arctic Ocean dump sites of radioactive waste. SU: Soviet Union (38,369 TBq), RU: Russia (0.7 TBq), SE: Sweden.

==== North Atlantic ====
Dumping occurred from 1948 to 1982. The UK accounts for 78% of dumping in the Atlantic (35,088 TBq), followed by Switzerland (4,419 TBq), the United States (2,924 TBq) and Belgium (2,120 TBq). Sunken Soviet nuclear submarines are not included; see List of sunken nuclear submarines

There were 137,000 tonnes dumped by eight European countries. The United States reported neither tonnage nor volume for 34,282 containers.

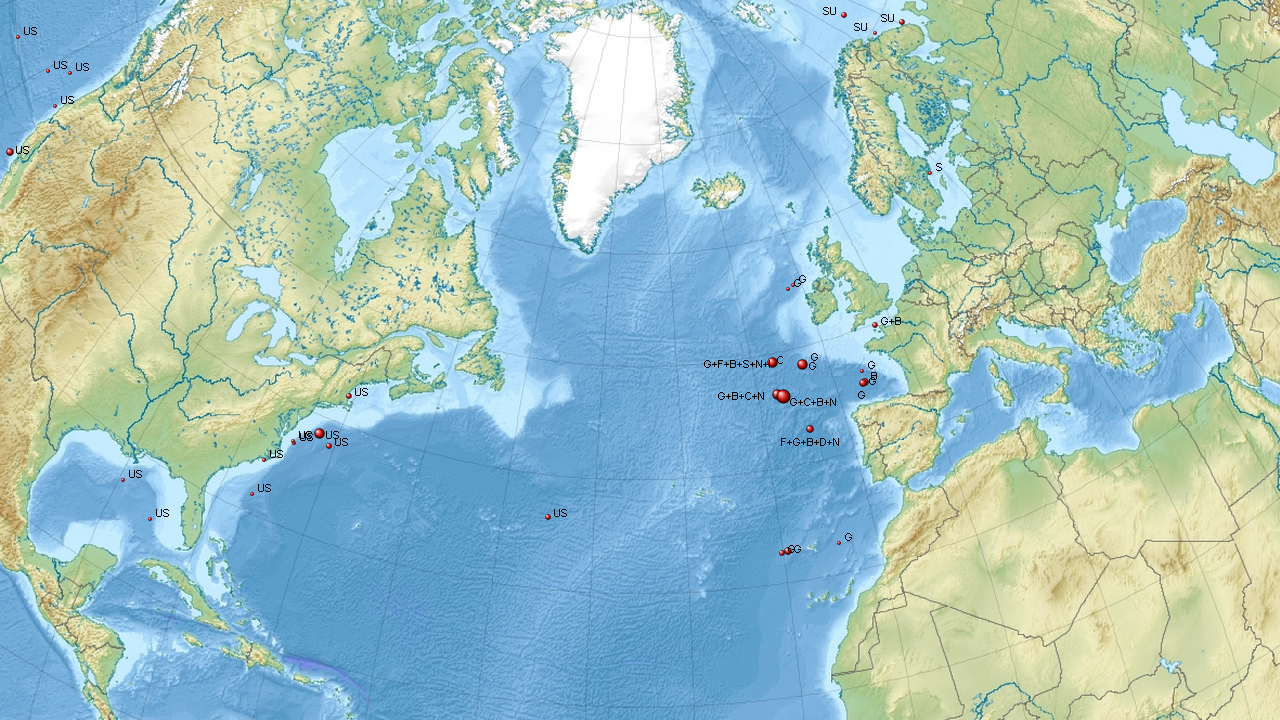
B: Belgium (2,120 TBq), F: France (354 TBq), D: Germany (0.2 TBq), I: Italy (0.2 TBq), N: the Netherlands (336 TBq), S: Sweden (3.2 TBq), C: Switzerland (4,419 TBq), G:United Kingdom (35,088 TBq), US: United States (2,942 TBq), SU: Soviet Union.

==== Pacific Ocean ====
The Soviet Union 874 TBq, US 554 TBq, Japan 606.2 Tonnes, New Zealand 1+ TBq. 751,000 m^{3} was dumped by Japan and the Soviet Union. The United States reported neither tonnage nor volume of 56,261 containers.

Dumping of contaminated water at the 2011 Fukushima nuclear accident (estimate 4,700–27,000 TBq) is not included.

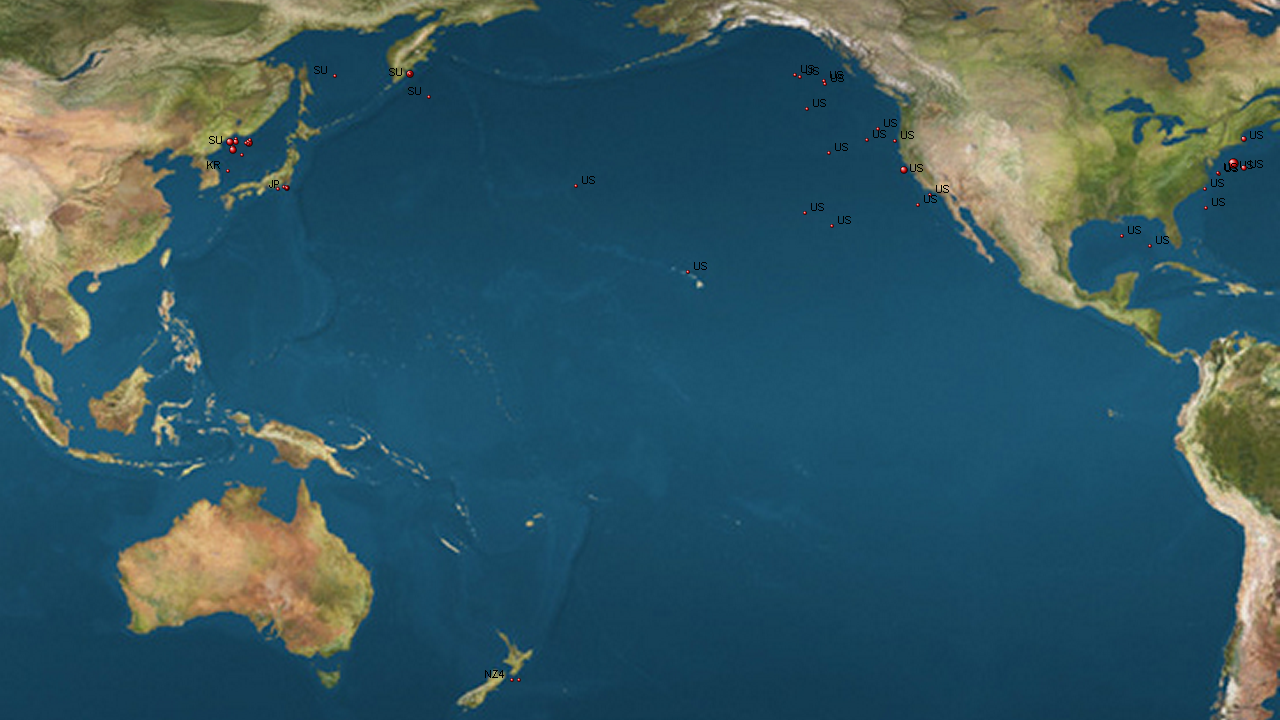
JP: Japan (15.1 TBq), KR: South Korea (? TBq), NZ: New Zealand (1+ TBq), RU: Russia (2.1 TBq), SU: Soviet Union (874 TBq), US: United States (554 TBq)

==== Sea of Japan ====
The Soviet Union dumped 749 TBq. Japan dumped 15.1 TBq south of main island. South Korea dumped 45 tonnes (unknown radioactivity value).

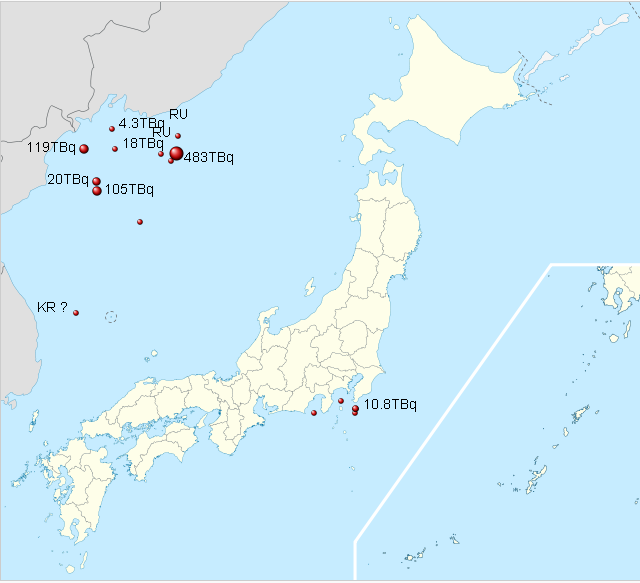
Dump sites in the Sea of Japan. Sites off coast of Nakhodka are of the Soviet Union and Russia.

== Environmental impact ==
Data are from IAEA-TECDOC-1105.

=== Arctic Ocean ===
Joint Russian-Norwegian expeditions (1992–94) collected samples from four dump sites. At immediate vicinity of waste containers, elevated levels of radionuclide were found, but had not contaminated the surrounding area.

=== North-East Atlantic Ocean ===
Dumping was undertaken by UK, Switzerland, Belgium, France, the Netherlands, Sweden, Germany and Italy. IAEA had been studying since 1977. The report of 1996, by CRESP suggests measurable leakages of radioactive material, and, concluded that environmental impact is negligible.

=== North-East Pacific Ocean, North-West Atlantic Ocean dump sites of USA ===
These sites are monitored by the United States Environmental Protection Agency and US National Oceanic and Atmospheric Administration. So far, no excess level of radionuclides was found in samples (sea water, sediments) collected in the area, except the sample taken at a location close to disposed packages that contained elevated levels of isotopes of caesium and plutonium.

=== North-West Pacific Ocean dump sites of the Soviet Union, Japan, Russia, and Korea ===
The joint Japanese-Korean-Russian expedition (1994–95) concluded that contamination resulted mainly from global fallout. The USSR dumped waste in the Sea of Japan. Japan dumped waste south of the main island.

== Policies ==
The first conversations surrounding dumping radioactive waste into the ocean began in 1958 at the United Nations Law of the Sea Conference (UNCLOS). The conference resulted in an agreement that all states should actively try to prevent radioactive waste pollution in the sea and follow any international guidelines regarding the issue. The UNCLOS also instigated research into the issues radioactive waste dumping caused.

However, by the late 1960s to early 1970s, millions of tons of waste were still being dumped into the ocean annually. By this time, governments began to realize the severe impacts of marine pollution, which led to one of the first international policies regarding ocean dumping in 1972 – the London Convention. The London Convention's main goals were to effectively control sources of marine pollution and take the proper steps to prevent it from happening, mainly accomplishing this by banning specific substances from being dumped in the ocean. The most recent version of the London Convention now bans all materials from marine dumping, except a thoroughly researched list of certain wastes. It also prohibits waste from being exported to other countries for disposal, as well as incinerating waste in the ocean. While smaller organizations like the Nuclear Energy Agency of the European Organization for Economic Cooperation and Development have produced similar regulations, the London Convention remains the central international figure of radioactive waste policies.

Although there are many existing regulations that ban ocean dumping, it is still a prevalent issue. Different countries enforce the ban on radioactive waste dumping on different levels, resulting in an inconsistent implementation of the agreed upon policies. Because of these discrepancies, it is hard to judge the effectiveness of international regulations like the London Convention.

== Ocean floor disposal ==
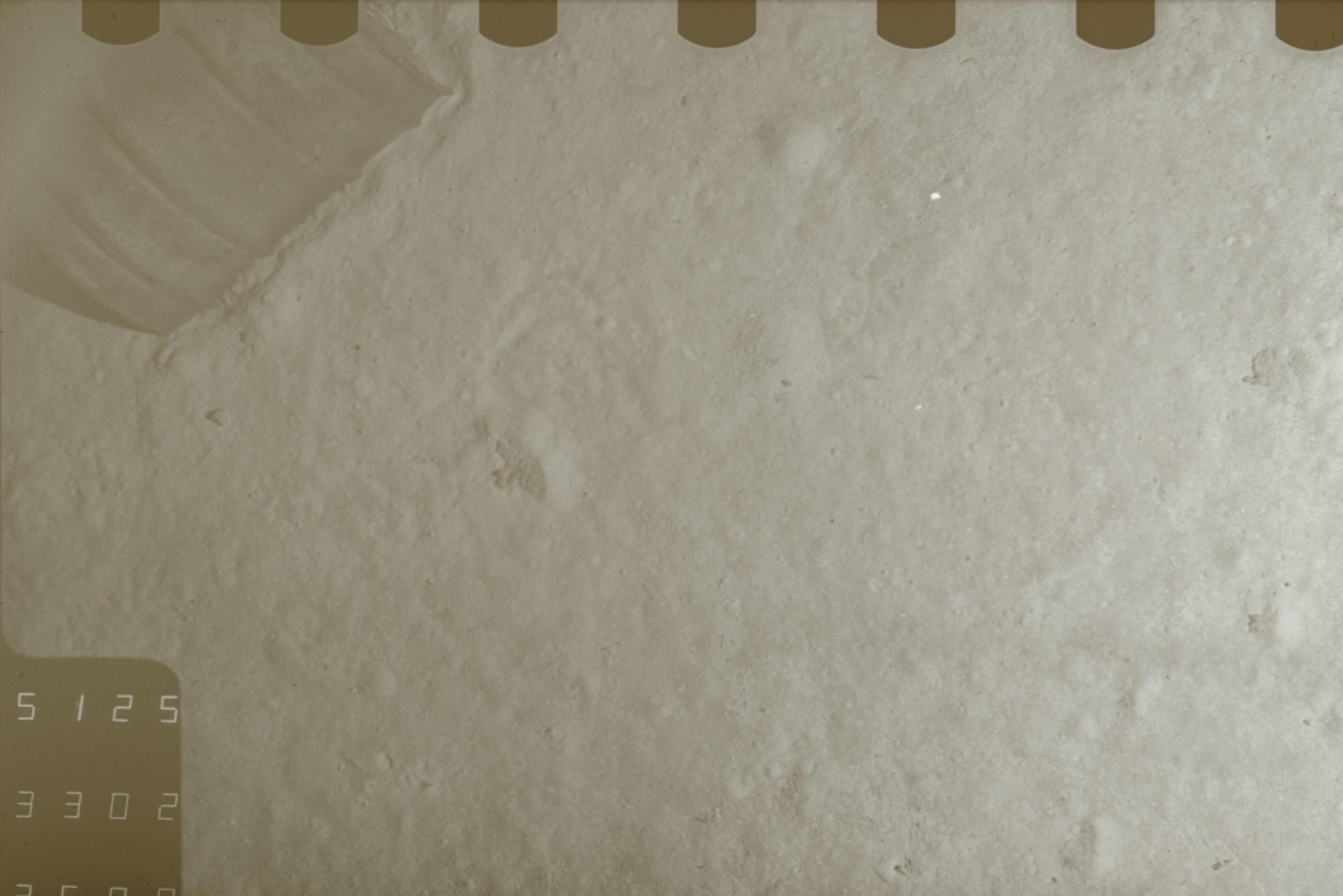
Waste contained in a drum (top left) on the ocean floor.

Ocean floor disposal is a method of sequestering radioactive waste in ocean floor sediment where it is unlikely to be disturbed either geologically or by human activity.

Several methods of depositing material in the ocean floor have been proposed, including encasing it in concrete and as the United Kingdom has previously done, dropping it in torpedoes designed to increase the depth of penetration into the ocean floor, or depositing containers in shafts drilled with techniques similar to those used in oil exploration.

Ocean floor sediment is saturated with water, but since there is no water table per se and the water does not flow through it the migration of dissolved waste is limited to the rate at which it can diffuse through dense clay. This is slow enough that it could potentially take millions of years for waste to diffuse through several tens of meters of sediment so that by the time it reaches open ocean it would be highly dilute and decayed. Large regions of the ocean floor are thought to be completely geologically inactive and it is not expected that there will be extensive human activity there in the future. Water absorbs essentially all radiation within a few meters provided the waste remains contained.

One of the problems associated with this option includes the difficulty of recovering the waste, if necessary, once it is emplaced deep in the ocean. Also, establishing an effective international structure to develop, regulate, and monitor a sub-seabed repository would be extremely difficult.

Beyond technical and political considerations, the London Convention places prohibitions on disposing of radioactive materials at sea and does not make a distinction between waste dumped directly into the water and waste that is buried underneath the ocean's floor. It remained in force until 2018, after which the sub-seabed disposal option can be revisited at 25-year intervals.

Depositing waste, in suitable containers, in subduction zones has also been suggested. Here, waste would be transported by plate tectonic movement into the Earth's mantle and rendered harmless through dilution and natural decay. Several objections have been raised to this method, including vulnerabilities during transport and disposal, as well as uncertainties in the actual tectonic processes.

== See also ==
- Horizontal drillhole disposal
- Deep borehole disposal
- Yucca Mountain nuclear waste repository
- Waste Isolation Pilot Plant
- Grigory Pasko
- Nuclear fuel cycle
- Great Lakes Basin § Nuclear power plants
- Decommissioning of Russian nuclear-powered vessels
- Toxic waste dumping by the 'Ndrangheta
