= Robert Rohde =

American physicist

- Robert Andrew Rohde
- Education: University of California, Berkeley Texas Academy of Mathematics and Science
- Known for: Work on Berkeley Earth
- Scientific career
- Fields: Experimental physics, theoretical physics, environmental science, data analysis
- Thesis: The Development and Use of the Berkeley Fluorescence Spectrometer to Characterize Microbial Content and Detect Volcanic Ash in Glacial Ice (2010)
- Doctoral advisor: Richard A. Muller

Robert Andrew Rohde is an American physicist and former graduate student at the University of California, Berkeley, where he studied under Richard A. Muller. He received his PhD in 2010 with a thesis entitled "The Development and Use of the Berkeley Fluorescence Spectrometer to Characterize Microbial Content and Detect Volcanic Ash in Glacial Ice." He is also the founder of the website Global Warming Art and a Wikipedia editor under the username "Dragons Flight".

== Research ==
While a grad student, Rohde and Muller published a letter to Nature on the topic of mass extinctions throughout Earth's history. Rohde et al. found that such extinctions occur surprisingly regularly, about every 62 million years. During this time, he also published two papers regarding microbial metabolism in ice crystals. This research, which showed that microbes can survive in such conditions for up to 100,000 years, was reported on by New Scientist at the time of its publication.

Starting in 2011, Rohde has attracted media attention because of his role in the Berkeley Earth project (also known as "BEST") as the lead scientist, and was responsible for writing software that searched databases for global temperature records, compiled the records, and merged them into a global temperature record, a task that Muller compared to "Hercules's enormous task of cleaning the Augean stables." With regard to Rohde's role in BEST, Muller also said that Rohde was responsible for extending the temperature record determined by the project back to 1753. In 2015, he and Muller co-authored another study that found that air pollution in China was responsible for the early deaths of 1.6 million people each year.
