= Richard A. Muller =

American physicist

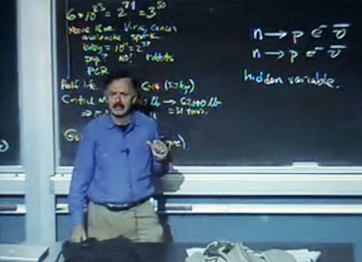
- Muller explaining antimatter
- Born: January 6, 1944 (age 82)
- Education: Columbia University (AB); University of California, Berkeley (PhD)
- Scientific career
- Fields: Physics
- Institutions: University of California, Berkeley; Lawrence Berkeley National Laboratory
- Doctoral advisor: Luis Walter Alvarez

Richard A. Muller (born January 6, 1944) is an American physicist and emeritus professor of physics at the University of California, Berkeley. He was also a faculty senior scientist at the Lawrence Berkeley National Laboratory. In early 2010, Muller and his daughter Elizabeth Muller founded the group Berkeley Earth, an independent 501(c)(3) non-profit aimed at addressing some of the major concerns of the climate change skeptics, in particular the global surface temperature record. In 2016, Richard and Elizabeth Muller co-founded Deep Isolation, a private company seeking to dispose of nuclear waste in deep boreholes.

== Early life, education and career ==
Muller, who grew up in the South Bronx, attended public schools in New York City, including PS 65 (on 141st St), Junior High School 22 (on 167th St), and the Bronx High School of Science. Muller obtained an A.B. degree at Columbia University (New York) and a Ph.D. degree in physics from University of California, Berkeley. Muller began his career as a graduate student under Nobel laureate Luis Alvarez performing particle physics experiments and working with bubble chambers. During his early years he also helped to co-create accelerator mass spectrometry and made some of the first measurements of anisotropy in the cosmic microwave background.

Subsequently, Muller branched out into other areas of science, and in particular the Earth sciences. His work has included attempting to understand the ice ages, dynamics at the core-mantle boundary, patterns of extinction and biodiversity through time, and the processes associated with impact cratering. One of his most well known proposals is the Nemesis hypothesis suggesting the Sun could have an as yet undetected companion dwarf star, whose perturbations of the Oort cloud and subsequent effects on the flux of comets entering the inner Solar System could explain an apparent 26 million year periodicity in extinction events.

In March 2011, he testified to the U.S. House Science, Space and Technology Committee that preliminary data confirmed an overall global warming trend. On July 28, 2012, he stated, "Humans are almost entirely the cause."

Along with Carl Pennypacker, Muller started The Berkeley Real Time Supernova Search, which became The Berkeley Automated Supernova Search. It then became the Supernova Cosmology Project, which discovered the accelerating expansion of the universe, for which Muller's graduate student, Saul Perlmutter, shared the 2011 Nobel Prize in Physics.

== Positions and recognition ==
In the 1980s, Muller joined the JASON advisory group, which brings together prominent scientists as consultants for the United States Department of Defense.

He was named a MacArthur Foundation Fellow in 1982. He also received the Alan T. Waterman Award in 1978 from the National Science Foundation "for highly original and innovative research which has led to important discoveries and inventions in diverse areas of physics, including astrophysics, radioisotope dating, and optics".

Muller is a founder and board member of Berkeley Earth, a non-profit organization focused on publishing independent analyses of the Earth's surface temperature records.

In 1999, he received a distinguished teaching award from UC Berkeley. His "Physics for Future Presidents" series of lectures, in which Muller teaches a synopsis of modern qualitative (i.e. without resorting to complicated math) physics, has been released publicly on YouTube by UC Berkeley and has been published in book form. It has been one of the most highly regarded courses at Berkeley. In December 2009, Muller officially retired from teaching the course, although he still occasionally gives guest lectures.

In 2015 a team including Muller received the Breakthrough Prize in Fundamental Physics for the Supernova Cosmology Project.

== MIT Technology Review ==
For several years, he was a monthly columnist with MIT's Technology Review. In his August 2003 column on the polygraph machine used in lie detection examinations, Muller asserted that "the polygraph procedure has an accuracy between 80 and 95 percent". The National Academy of Sciences found that there is "little basis for the expectation that a polygraph test could have extremely high accuracy".

In his April 2002 column on the anthrax attacks, Muller claimed "I think it likely that the anthrax terrorists were working for Osama bin Laden, and intended to murder thousands of people."

== Climate change ==
=== Hockey stick graph ===
After the Soon and Baliunas controversy led to the paper being dismissed as defective and resignations of the journal's editors, Muller wrote in his 17 December 2003 Technology Review column that, while poor papers were not uncommon, Soon and Baliunas had attracted unusual attention for their portrayal of a prominent Medieval Warm Period in contrast to the Mann, Bradley and Hughes (MBH99) reconstruction of the temperature record of the past 1000 years. This reconstruction, nicknamed the hockey stick graph, had featured prominently in the IPCC Third Assessment Report, and differed significantly from the schematic diagram shown in the IPCC First Assessment Report. Muller gave his views on the subsequent controversy. He noted the October 2003 paper by Stephen McIntyre and Ross McKitrick published in Energy and Environment which alleged that correction of errors in MBH99 would show a strong medieval warm period, and said this paper raised pertinent questions.

In an October 2004 Technology Review article, Muller discussed blog postings by McIntyre and McKitrick alleging that Mann, Bradley and Hughes did not do proper principal component analysis (PCA). In the article, Richard Muller stated:

McIntyre and McKitrick obtained part of the program that Mann used, and they found serious problems. Not only does the program not do conventional PCA, but it handles data normalization in a way that can only be described as mistaken.

Now comes the real shocker. This improper normalization procedure tends to emphasize any data that do have the hockey stick shape, and to suppress all data that do not. To demonstrate this effect, McIntyre and McKitrick created some meaningless test data that had, on average, no trends. This method of generating random data is called "Monte Carlo" analysis, after the famous casino, and it is widely used in statistical analysis to test procedures. When McIntyre and McKitrick fed these random data into the Mann procedure, out popped a hockey stick shape!

That discovery hit me like a bombshell, and I suspect it is having the same effect on many others. Suddenly the hockey stick, the poster-child of the global warming community, turns out to be an artifact of poor mathematics. How could it happen?

He went on to state "If you are concerned about global warming (as I am) and think that human-created carbon dioxide may contribute (as I do), then you still should agree that we are much better off having broken the hockey stick. Misinformation can do real harm, because it distorts predictions." In an article on the RealClimate blog on various myths about the graph, Mann mentioned Muller's article as parroting the claims of McIntyre and McKitrick. Muller's opinion piece in the reputable MIT journal helped to spread the idea that the hockey stick shape was a statistical artifact, but several peer reviewed studies showed that the PCA methodology had little effect on the shape of the graph. By 2006 there was general acceptance of the conclusion of the graph that recent warming was unprecedented in 1,000 years.

=== Berkeley Earth ===
In October 2011, Muller wrote in an op-ed in The Wall Street Journal, concerning his work with the Berkeley Earth Surface Temperature project:

When we began our study, we felt that skeptics had raised legitimate issues, and we didn't know what we'd find. Our results turned out to be close to those published by prior groups. We think that means that those groups had truly been very careful in their work, despite their inability to convince some skeptics of that. They managed to avoid bias in their data selection, homogenization and other corrections.

Global warming is real. Perhaps our results will help cool this portion of the climate debate. How much of the warming is due to humans and what will be the likely effects? We made no independent assessment of that.

While the BEST project did not delve into the proxy data sets used in the "hockey stick", the importance of the work regarding the modern temperature record is explained on the BEST web site:

Existing data used to show global warming have met with much criticism. The Berkeley Earth project attempts to resolve current criticism of the former temperature analyses by making available an open record to enable rapid response to further criticism and suggestions. Our results include our best estimate for the global temperature change and our estimates of the uncertainties in the record.

On July 28, 2012, he stated, "[G]lobal warming [is] real .... Humans are almost entirely the cause."

Foreign Policy named Muller one of its 2012 FP Top 100 Global Thinkers "for changing their minds".

=== Trends in tornado activity ===
In November 2013 Muller wrote an op-ed in The New York Times arguing that strong to violent tornado activity decreased since the 1950s and suggesting that global warming is the cause. Atmospheric scientists Paul Markowski, Harold E. Brooks, et al., replied that Muller made substantial methodological flaws and was ignorant of long established findings in severe storms meteorology. They argue that there is no discernible decrease in significant tornado activity and that attribution of tornadic activity to global warming is premature although changes, especially in regional character, are likely as the atmospheric environment changes.

== Shale gas and hydraulic fracturing ==
In a report for the Centre for Policy Studies, Muller (and Elizabeth Muller of Berkeley Earth, his daughter) wrote that the benefits of shale gas, displacing harmful air pollution from coal, far outweigh the environmental costs of fracking. According to the Mullers, air pollution, mostly from coal burning, kills over three million people each year, primarily in the developing world. The Mullers state that "Environmentalists who oppose the development of shale gas and fracking are making a tragic mistake."

== Other work ==
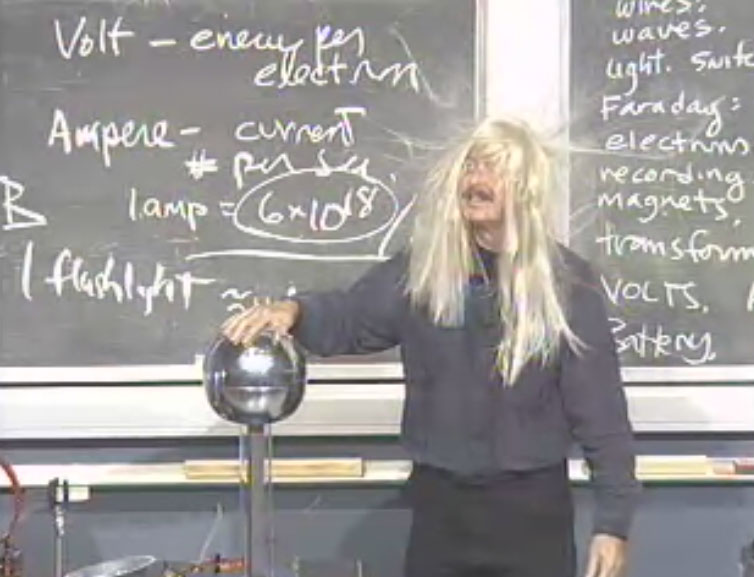
Muller demos a Van de Graaff generator

Muller is President and Chief Scientist of Muller & Associates, an international consulting group specializing in energy-related issues.

Muller is Chief Technology Officer of SoliDDD Corp., which uses advanced optical design methods to deliver improved 3D images.

Muller is co-founder and Chief Science Officer of Deep Isolation, a company offering deep borehole disposal of nuclear waste.

Muller is co-founder and Chief Technology Officer of Deep Fission, Inc., a company developing an underground reactor concept it calls the Gravity Reactor.

== Published books ==
- Nemesis: The Death Star (Weidenfeld & Nicolson, 1988) ISBN 0-7493-0465-0
- The Three Big Bangs: Comet Crashes, Exploding Stars, and the Creation of the Universe (with coauthor Phil Dauber, Addison-Wesley 1996) ISBN 0-201-15495-1
- Ice Ages and Astronomical Causes: data, spectral analysis, and mechanisms (with coauthor Gordon J. F. MacDonald, 2002) ISBN 3-540-43779-7
- The Sins of Jesus (a historical novel, Auravision Publishing 1999) ISBN 0-9672765-1-9
- Physics for Future Presidents (W. W. Norton, 2008) ISBN 978-0-393-33711-2
- The Instant Physicist: An Illustrated Guide (W. W. Norton, 2010) ISBN 978-0-393-07826-8
- Physics and Technology for Future Presidents: An Introduction to the Essential Physics Every World Leader Needs to Know (Princeton University Press, April 2010) ISBN 978-0-691-13504-5
- Energy for Future Presidents: The Science Behind the Headlines (W. W. Norton, 2012) ISBN 978-0-393-34510-0
- Now: The Physics of Time (W. W. Norton, 2016) ISBN 978-0-393-28523-9

== See also ==
- Global warming controversy
