= Physics for Future Presidents =

Book by Richard A. Muller

Physics for Future Presidents: The Science Behind the Headlines
- Author: Richard A. Muller
- Subject: Physics
- Genre: Non-fiction
- Publisher: W. W. Norton
- Publication date: 2008
- Media type: Print (hardcover and paperback)
- Pages: 384
- ISBN: 0393337111
- Preceded by: Ice Ages and Astronomical Causes
- Followed by: The Instant Physicist: An Illustrated Guide for Dummies

Physics for Future Presidents: The Science Behind the Headlines is a 2008 book by University of California, Berkeley professor Richard A. Muller. It attempts to explain many physics concepts to the educated layperson, with specific applications to current issues like terrorism, energy, and climate change.

== Contents ==
The book explains physics concepts and shows statistics as they relate to terrorism, energy, nuclear weapons, space and global warming. Muller believes that gasoline is one of the best weapons for a terrorist due to its availability and high energy density. Physics for Future Presidents is interspersed with policy recommendations, such as that future presidents should not worry about terrorists building nuclear weapons and instead focus on stopping them from flying planes. It criticizes those who distort the facts, especially with regards to climate change. “Global warming is real," Muller writes. "It is very likely caused by humans.”

== Reception ==
Physics for Future Presidents received mostly favorable reviews from critics. It received the 2009 Northern California Book Award for General Nonfiction. Heather Benjamin of Science News recommended it to people who are interested in political policies based on science.

Lisa Jardine-Wright disliked the book's first section on terrorism, which she thought focused too much on the personalities of terrorists as opposed to the actual physics. She also took issue with how the book "lacked insight into how physics and science really work - the importance of observation and experimentation that provide evidence from which we are able to draw a series of conclusions." However, she writes, "as I read beyond the emotional subject of terrorism in Muller's first section, I became much more engaged with his writing. The later parts of his book, covering issues of energy, nuclear power and global warming, were informative, easy to follow and, in my opinion, contained a lot more physics. Indeed, beginning the book with part two would have changed my first impressions significantly." Jardine believes Physics for Future Presidents's biggest strength is how "Muller reinforces the point that there are no immediate solutions to our 21st-century problems and that ultimately one must make a judgment call."
