= Nuclear fuel cycle =

Process of manufacturing and using nuclear fuel

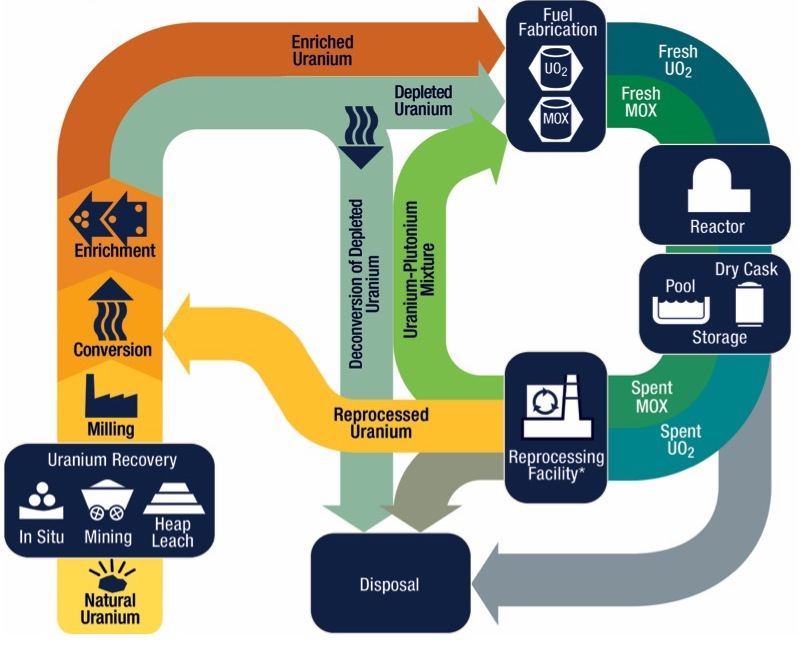
The nuclear fuel cycle describes how nuclear fuel is extracted, processed, used, and disposed of

The nuclear fuel cycle, also known as the nuclear fuel chain, is the series of stages that nuclear fuel undergoes during its production, use, and recycling or disposal. It consists of steps in the front end, which are the preparation of the fuel, steps in the service period in which the fuel is used during reactor operation, and steps in the back end, which are necessary to safely manage, contain, and either reprocess or dispose of spent nuclear fuel. If spent fuel is not reprocessed, the fuel cycle is referred to as an open fuel cycle (or a once-through fuel cycle); if the spent fuel is reprocessed, it is referred to as a closed fuel cycle.

== Basic concepts ==
Nuclear power relies on fissionable material that can sustain a chain reaction with neutrons. Examples of such materials include uranium and plutonium. Most nuclear reactors use a moderator to lower the kinetic energy of the neutrons and increase the probability that fission will occur. This allows reactors to use material with far lower concentration of fissile isotopes than are needed for nuclear weapons. Graphite and heavy water are the most effective moderators, because they slow the neutrons through collisions without absorbing them. Reactors using heavy water or graphite as the moderator can operate using natural uranium.

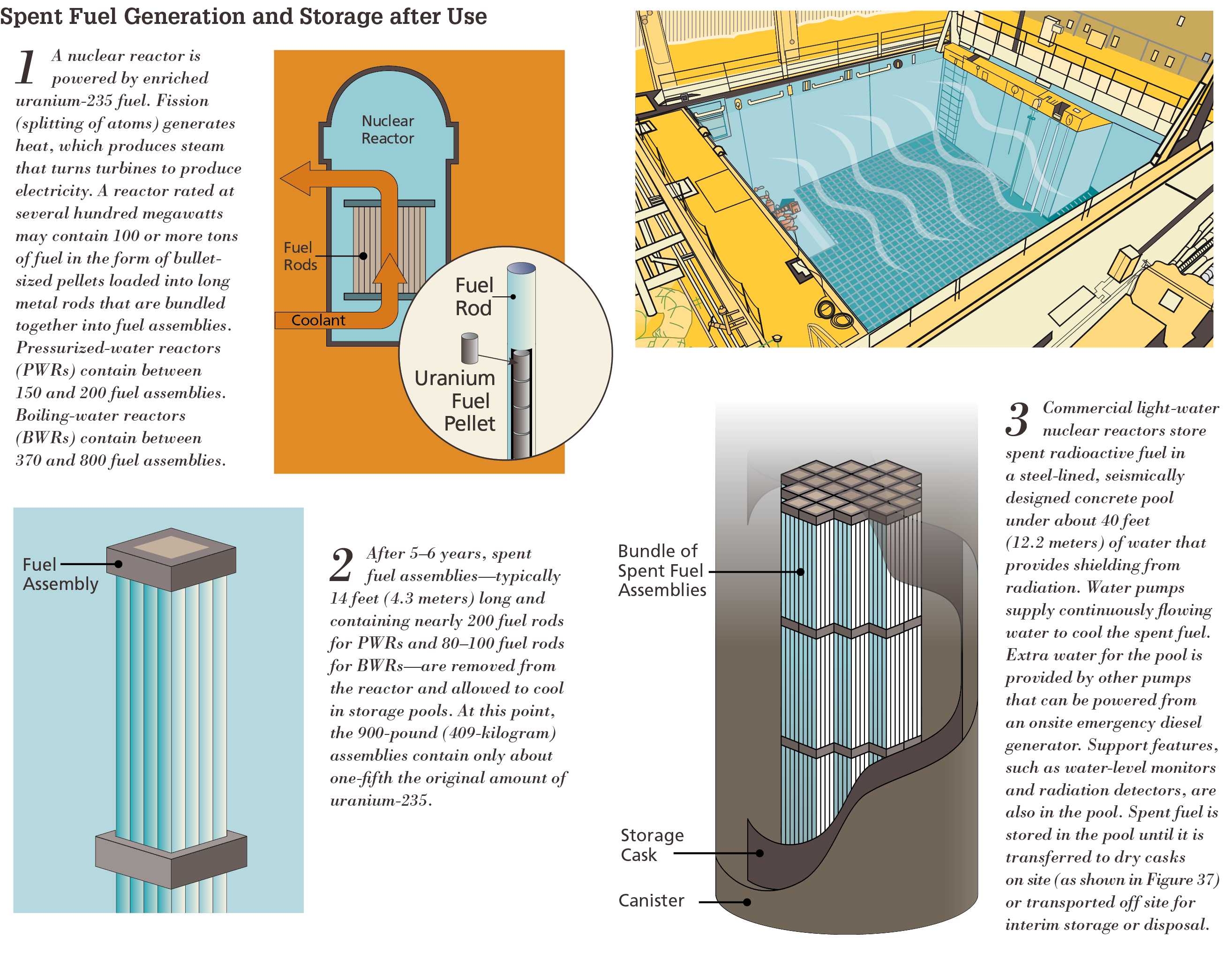
The lifecycle of fuel in the present US system. If put in one place the total inventory of spent nuclear fuel generated by the commercial fleet of power stations in the United States, would stand 7.6 metres (25 ft) tall and be 91 metres (300 ft) on a side, approximately the footprint of one American football field.

A light water reactor (LWR) uses water in the form that occurs in nature, and requires fuel enriched to higher concentrations of fissile isotopes. Typically, LWRs use uranium enriched to 3–5% U-235, the only fissile isotope that is found in significant quantity in nature. One alternative to this low-enriched uranium (LEU) fuel is mixed oxide (MOX) fuel produced by blending plutonium with natural or depleted uranium, and these fuels provide an avenue to utilize surplus weapons-grade plutonium. Another type of MOX fuel involves mixing LEU with thorium, which generates the fissile isotope U-233. Both plutonium and U-233 are produced from the absorption of neutrons by irradiating fertile materials in a reactor, in particular the common uranium isotope U-238 and thorium, respectively, and can be separated from spent uranium and thorium fuels in reprocessing plants.

Some reactors do not use moderators to slow the neutrons. Like nuclear weapons, which also use unmoderated or "fast" neutrons, these fast-neutron reactors require much higher concentrations of fissile isotopes in order to sustain a chain reaction. They are also capable of breeding fissile isotopes from fertile materials; a breeder reactor is one that generates more fissile material in this way than it consumes.

During the nuclear reaction inside a reactor, the fissile isotopes in nuclear fuel are consumed, producing more and more fission products, most of which are considered radioactive waste. The buildup of fission products and consumption of fissile isotopes eventually stop the nuclear reaction, causing the fuel to become a spent nuclear fuel. When 3% enriched LEU fuel is used, the spent fuel typically consists of roughly 1% U-235, 95% U-238, 1% plutonium and 3% fission products. Spent fuel and other high-level radioactive waste is extremely hazardous, although nuclear reactors produce orders of magnitude smaller volumes of waste compared to other power plants because of the high energy density of nuclear fuel. Safe management of these byproducts of nuclear power, including their storage and disposal, is a difficult problem for any country using nuclear power.

== Front end ==
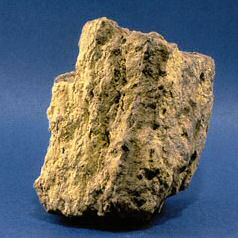
1 Uranium ore – the principal raw material of nuclear fuel

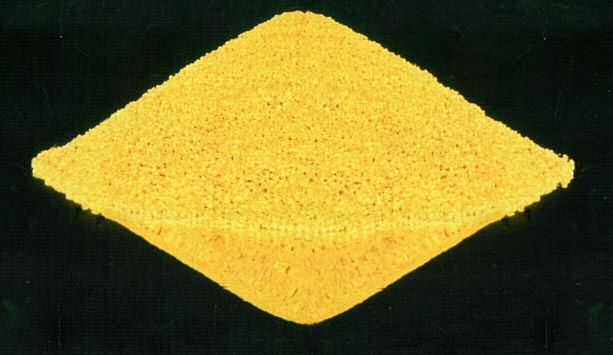
2 Yellowcake – the form in which uranium is transported to a conversion plant

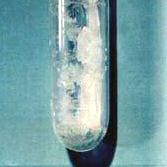
3 UF_{6} – used in enrichment

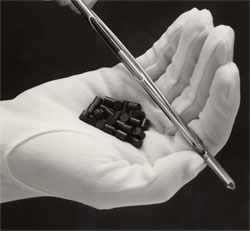
4 Nuclear fuel – a compact, inert, insoluble solid

=== Exploration ===
A deposit of uranium, such as uraninite, discovered by geophysical techniques, is evaluated and sampled to determine the amounts of uranium materials that are extractable at specified costs from the deposit. Uranium reserves are the amounts of ore that are estimated to be recoverable at stated costs.

Naturally occurring uranium consists primarily of two isotopes U-238 and U-235, with 99.28% of the metal being U-238 while 0.71% is U-235, and the remaining 0.01% is mostly U-234. The number in such names refers to the isotope's atomic mass number, which is the number of protons plus the number of neutrons in the atomic nucleus.

The atomic nucleus of U-235 will nearly always fission when struck by a free neutron, and the isotope is therefore said to be a "fissile" isotope. The nucleus of a U-238 atom on the other hand, rather than undergoing fission when struck by a free neutron, will nearly always absorb the neutron and yield an atom of the isotope U-239. This isotope then undergoes natural radioactive decay to yield Pu-239, which, like U-235, is a fissile isotope. The atoms of U-238 are said to be fertile, because, through neutron irradiation in the core, some eventually yield atoms of fissile Pu-239.

=== Mining ===
Uranium ore can be extracted through conventional mining in open pit and underground methods similar to those used for mining other metals. In situ leach mining methods also are used to mine uranium in the United States. In this technology, uranium is leached from the in-place ore through an array of regularly spaced wells and is then recovered from the leach solution at a surface plant. Uranium ores in the United States typically range from about 0.05 to 0.3% uranium oxide (U_{3}O_{8}). Some uranium deposits developed in other countries are of higher grade and are also larger than deposits mined in the United States. Uranium is also present in very low-grade amounts (50 to 200 parts per million) in some domestic phosphate-bearing deposits of marine origin. Because very large quantities of phosphate-bearing rock are mined for the production of wet-process phosphoric acid used in high analysis fertilizers and other phosphate chemicals, at some phosphate processing plants the uranium, although present in very low concentrations, can be economically recovered from the process stream.

=== Milling ===
When Uranium is mined out of the ground it does not contain enough pure uranium per pound to be used. The process of milling is how the cycle extracts the usable uranium from the rest of the materials, also known as tailings. To begin the milling process the ore is either ground into fine dust with water or crushed into dust without water. Once the materials have been physically treated, they then begin the process of being chemically treated by being doused in acids. Acids used include hydrochloric and nitrous acids, but the most common acids are sulfuric acids. Alternatively, if the material that the ore is made of is particularly resistant to acids, then an alkali is used instead. After being treated chemically, the uranium particles are dissolved into the solution used to treat them. This solution is then filtered until what solids remain are separated from the liquids that contain the uranium. The undesirable solids are disposed of as tailings. Once the solution has had the tailings removed, the uranium is extracted from the rest of the liquid solution in one of two ways: solvent exchange or ion exchange. In the first of these a solvent is mixed into the solution. The dissolved uranium binds to the solvent and floats to the top while the other dissolved materials remain in the mixture. During ion exchange a different material is mixed into the solution and the uranium binds to it. Once filtered the material is panned out and washed off. The solution will repeat this process of filtration to pull as much usable uranium out as possible. The filtered uranium is then dried out into U_{3}O_{8} uranium. The milling process commonly yields dry powder-form material consisting of natural uranium, "yellowcake," which is sold on the uranium market as U_{3}O_{8}. Note that the material is not always yellow.

=== Uranium conversion ===
Usually, milled uranium oxide, U_{3}O_{8} (triuranium octoxide), is then processed into one of two substances, depending on the intended use.

For use in most reactors, U_{3}O_{8} is usually converted to uranium hexafluoride (UF_{6}), the input stock for most commercial uranium enrichment facilities. A solid at room temperature, uranium hexafluoride becomes gaseous at 57 °C (134 °F). At this stage of the cycle, the uranium hexafluoride conversion product still has the natural isotopic mix (99.28% of U-238 plus 0.71% of U-235, plus 0.01% of the somewhat unusable U-234).

For use in reactors such as CANDU, which do not require enriched fuel, the U_{3}O_{8} may instead be converted to uranium dioxide (UO_{2}), which can be included in ceramic fuel elements.

In one conversion method, called the wet option, the yellowcake is dissolved in nitric acid then extracted using tributyl phosphate. The resulting mixture is then dried and washed resulting in uranium trioxide. The uranium trioxide is then mixed with pure hydrogen resulting in uranium dioxide and water. After that, the uranium dioxide is mixed with four parts hydrogen fluoride resulting in more water and uranium tetrafluoride. Finally the end product of uranium hexafluoride is created by simply adding more fluoride to the mixture.

In the current nuclear industry, the volume of material converted directly to UO_{2} is typically quite small compared to that converted to UF_{6}.

=== Enrichment ===
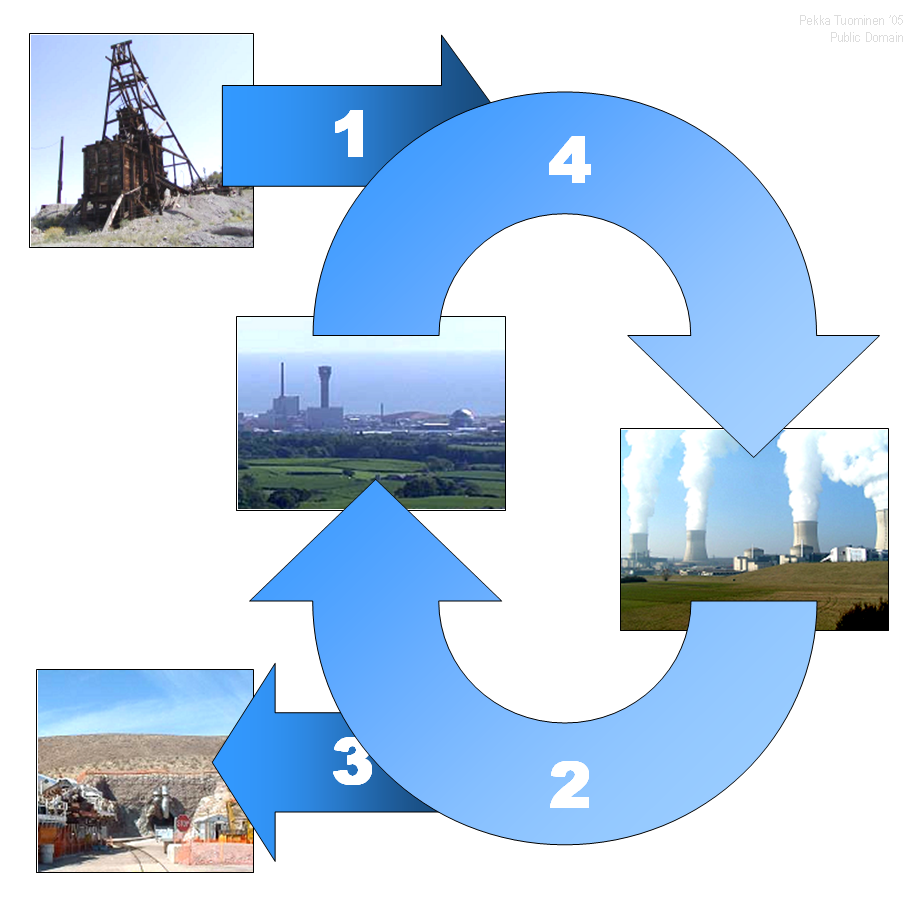
Nuclear fuel cycle begins when uranium is mined, enriched and manufactured to nuclear fuel (1) which is delivered to a nuclear power plant. After usage in the power plant the spent fuel is delivered to a reprocessing plant (if fuel is recycled) (2) or to a final repository (if no recycling is done) (3) for geological disposition. In reprocessing 95% of spent fuel can be recycled to be returned to usage in a nuclear power plant (4).

The natural concentration (0.71%) of the fissile isotope U-235 is less than that required to sustain a nuclear chain reaction in light water reactor cores. Accordingly, UF_{6} produced from natural uranium sources must be enriched to a higher concentration of the fissionable isotope before being used as nuclear fuel in such reactors. Light‑water reactor fuel is typically enriched from natural uranium to about 3–5% U‑235, with many modern cores using enrichments toward the upper end of this range (often close to 5%) to allow higher burnup and longer fuel cycles, although lower enrichments are also used for some applications. Enrichment is accomplished using any of several methods of isotope separation. Gaseous diffusion and gas centrifuge are the commonly used uranium enrichment methods, but new enrichment technologies are currently being developed.

The bulk (96%) of the byproduct from enrichment is depleted uranium (DU), which can be used for armor, kinetic energy penetrators, radiation shielding and ballast. As of 2008 there are vast quantities of depleted uranium in storage. The United States Department of Energy alone has 470,000 tonnes. About 95% of depleted uranium is stored as uranium hexafluoride (UF_{6}).

=== Fabrication ===
For use as nuclear fuel, enriched uranium hexafluoride is converted into uranium dioxide (UO_{2}) powder that is then processed into pellet form. The pellets are then fired in a high temperature sintering furnace to create hard, ceramic pellets of enriched uranium. The cylindrical pellets then undergo a grinding process to achieve a uniform pellet size. The pellets are stacked, according to each nuclear reactor core's design specifications, into tubes of corrosion-resistant metal alloy. The tubes are sealed to contain the fuel pellets: these tubes are called fuel rods. The finished fuel rods are grouped in special fuel assemblies that are then used to build up the nuclear fuel core of a power reactor.

The alloy used for the tubes depends on the design of the reactor. Stainless steel was used in the past, but most reactors now use a zirconium alloy. For the most common types of reactors, boiling water reactors (BWR) and pressurized water reactors (PWR), the tubes are assembled into bundles with the tubes spaced precise distances apart. These bundles are then given a unique identification number, which enables them to be tracked from manufacture through use and into disposal.

== Service period ==
=== Transport of radioactive materials ===
Transport is an integral part of the nuclear fuel cycle. There are nuclear power reactors in operation in several countries but uranium mining is viable in only a few areas. Also, in the course of over forty years of operation by the nuclear industry, a number of specialized facilities have been developed in various locations around the world to provide fuel cycle services and there is a need to transport nuclear materials to and from these facilities. Most transports of nuclear fuel material occur between different stages of the cycle, but occasionally a material may be transported between similar facilities. With some exceptions, nuclear fuel cycle materials are transported in solid form, the exception being uranium hexafluoride (UF_{6}) which is considered a gas. Most of the material used in nuclear fuel is transported several times during the cycle. Transports are frequently international, and are often over large distances. Nuclear materials are generally transported by specialized transport companies.

Since nuclear materials are radioactive, it is important to ensure that radiation exposure of those involved in the transport of such materials and of the general public along transport routes is limited. Packaging for nuclear materials includes, where appropriate, shielding to reduce potential radiation exposures. In the case of some materials, such as fresh uranium fuel assemblies, the radiation levels are negligible and no shielding is required. Other materials, such as spent fuel and high-level waste, are highly radioactive and require special handling. To limit the risk in transporting highly radioactive materials, containers known as spent nuclear fuel shipping casks are used which are designed to maintain integrity under normal transportation conditions and during hypothetical accident conditions.

While transport casks vary in design, material, size, and purpose, they are typically long tubes made of stainless steel or concrete with the ends sealed shut to prevent leaks. Frequently the casks' shell will have at least one layer of radiation-resistant material, such as lead. The inside of the tube will also vary depending on what is being transported. For example, casks that are transporting depleted or unused fuel rods will have sleeves that keep the rods separate, while casks that transport uranium hexafluoride typically have no internal organization. Depending on the purpose and radioactivity of the materials some casks have systems of ventilation, thermal protection, impact protection, and other features more specific to the route and cargo.

=== In-core fuel management ===
In commercial nuclear reactors, fuel rods are grouped into fuel assemblies, which are arranged to form the reactor core. Control rods are inserted between or within assemblies to regulate the fission chain reaction, while a coolant, commonly water, removes heat from the fuel and may also serve as a neutron moderator. During operation, fissile material is consumed and fission products accumulate, gradually reducing the fuel's reactivity.

To maintain reactor operation, a fraction of the spent fuel assemblies is periodically replaced with fresh fuel during refuelling outages. At the same time, fuel assemblies are often rearranged within the core to achieve a more favorable power distribution and improve fuel utilization. Because the spatial distribution of fuel characteristics strongly influences power generation, neutron economy, and operational safety margins, the selection of fresh fuel loading patterns and assembly positions is an important aspect of reactor core design.

In-core fuel management refers to the planning and optimization of fuel loading, reloading, and assembly shuffling within the reactor core. These activities belong to the class of combinatorial optimization problems, and are carried out subject to operational, engineering, and safety constraints. Modern fuel management relies on reactor physics calculations, computational optimization methods, and operating experience to identify suitable core configurations.

==== The study of used fuel ====
Used nuclear fuel is studied in Post irradiation examination, where used fuel is examined to know more about the processes that occur in fuel during use, and how these might alter the outcome of an accident. For example, during normal use, the fuel expands due to thermal expansion, which can cause cracking. Most nuclear fuel is uranium dioxide, which is a cubic solid with a structure similar to that of calcium fluoride. In used fuel the solid state structure of most of the solid remains the same as that of pure cubic uranium dioxide. SIMFUEL is the name given to the simulated spent fuel which is made by mixing finely ground metal oxides, grinding as a slurry, spray drying it before heating in hydrogen/argon to 1700 °C. (Note: A good report on the microstructure of used fuel is Lucuta, P. G.; Verrall, R. A.; Matzke, Hj.; Palmer, B. J. (1991). "Microstructural features of SIMFUEL – Simulated high-burnup UO2-based nuclear fuel". Journal of Nuclear Materials. 178 (1): 48–60. doi:10.1016/0022-3115(91)90455-G. ISSN 0022-3115.) In SIMFUEL, 4.1% of the volume of the solid was in the form of metal nanoparticles which are made of molybdenum, ruthenium, rhodium and palladium. Most of these metal particles are of the ε phase (hexagonal) of Mo-Ru-Rh-Pd alloy, while smaller amounts of the α (cubic) and σ (tetragonal) phases of these metals were found in the SIMFUEL. Also present within the SIMFUEL was a cubic perovskite phase which is a barium strontium zirconate (Ba_{x}Sr_{1−x}ZrO_{3}).

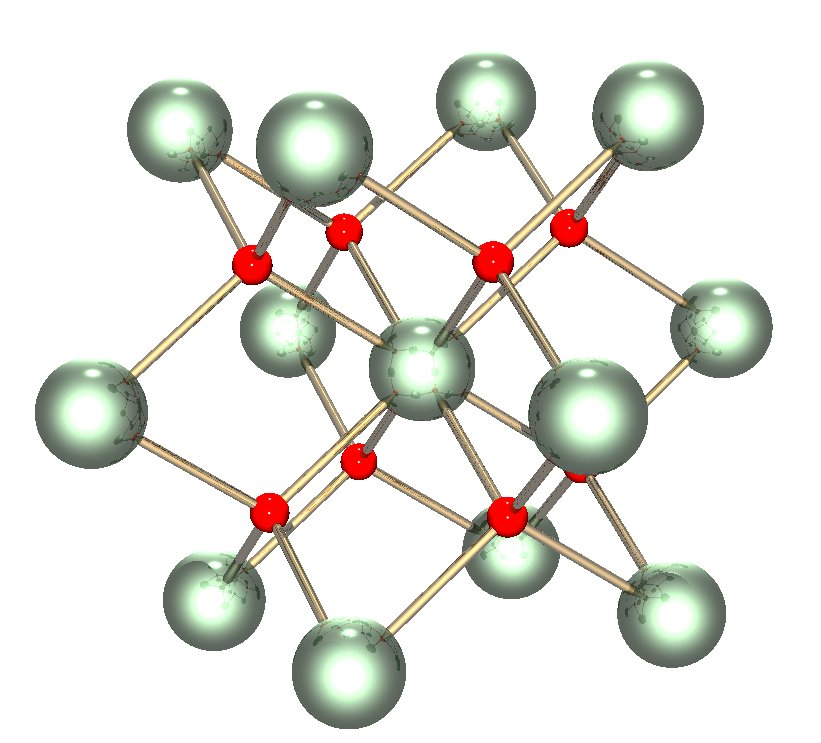
The solid state structure of uranium dioxide, the oxygen atoms are in green and the uranium atoms in red

Uranium dioxide is minimally soluble in water, but after oxidation it can be converted to uranium trioxide or another uranium(VI) compound which is much more soluble. Uranium dioxide (UO_{2}) can be oxidised to an oxygen rich hyperstoichiometric oxide (UO_{2+x}) which can be further oxidised to U_{4}O_{9}, U_{3}O_{7}, U_{3}O_{8} and UO_{3}·2H_{2}O.

Because used fuel contains alpha emitters (plutonium and the minor actinides), the effect of adding an alpha emitter (^{238}Pu) to uranium dioxide on the leaching rate of the oxide has been investigated. For the crushed oxide, adding ^{238}Pu tended to increase the rate of leaching, but the difference in the leaching rate between 0.1 and 10% ^{238}Pu was very small.

The concentration of carbonate in the water which is in contact with the used fuel has a considerable effect on the rate of corrosion, because uranium(VI) forms soluble anionic carbonate complexes such as [UO_{2}(CO_{3})_{2}]^{2−} and [UO_{2}(CO_{3})_{3}]^{4−}. When carbonate ions are absent, and the water is not strongly acidic, the hexavalent uranium compounds which form on oxidation of uranium dioxide often form insoluble hydrated uranium trioxide phases. (Note: For a review of the corrosion of uranium dioxide in a waste store which explains much of the chemistry, see Shoesmith, D. W. (2000). "Fuel corrosion processes under waste disposal conditions". Journal of Nuclear Materials. 282 (1): 1–31. doi:10.1016/S0022-3115(00)00392-5. ISSN 0022-3115.)

Thin films of uranium dioxide can be deposited upon gold surfaces by ‘sputtering’ using uranium metal and an argon/oxygen gas mixture. These gold surfaces modified with uranium dioxide have been used for both cyclic voltammetry and AC impedance experiments, and these offer an insight into the likely leaching behaviour of uranium dioxide.

==== Fuel cladding interactions ====
The study of the nuclear fuel cycle includes the study of the behaviour of nuclear materials both under normal conditions and under accident conditions. For example, there has been much work on how uranium dioxide based fuel interacts with the zirconium alloy tubing used to cover it. During use, the fuel swells due to thermal expansion and then starts to react with the surface of the zirconium alloy, forming a new layer which contains both fuel and zirconium (from the cladding). Then, on the fuel side of this mixed layer, there is a layer of fuel which has a higher caesium to uranium ratio than most of the fuel. This is because xenon isotopes are formed as fission products that diffuse out of the lattice of the fuel into voids such as the narrow gap between the fuel and the cladding. After diffusing into these voids, it decays to caesium isotopes. Because of the thermal gradient which exists in the fuel during use, the volatile fission products tend to be driven from the centre of the pellet to the rim area. (Note: Further reading on fuel cladding interactions: Tanaka, Kosuke; Maeda, Koji; Sasaki, Shinji; Ikusawa, Yoshihisa; Abe, Tomoyuki (2006). "Fuel – cladding chemical interaction in MOX fuel rods irradiated to high burnup in an advanced thermal reactor". Journal of Nuclear Materials. 357 (1): 58–68. doi:10.1016/j.jnucmat.2006.05.052. ISSN 0022-3115.) Below is a graph of the temperature of uranium metal, uranium nitride and uranium dioxide as a function of distance from the centre of a 20 mm diameter pellet with a rim temperature of 200 °C. The uranium dioxide (because of its poor thermal conductivity) will overheat at the centre of the pellet, while the other more thermally conductive forms of uranium remain below their melting points.

==== Normal and abnormal conditions ====
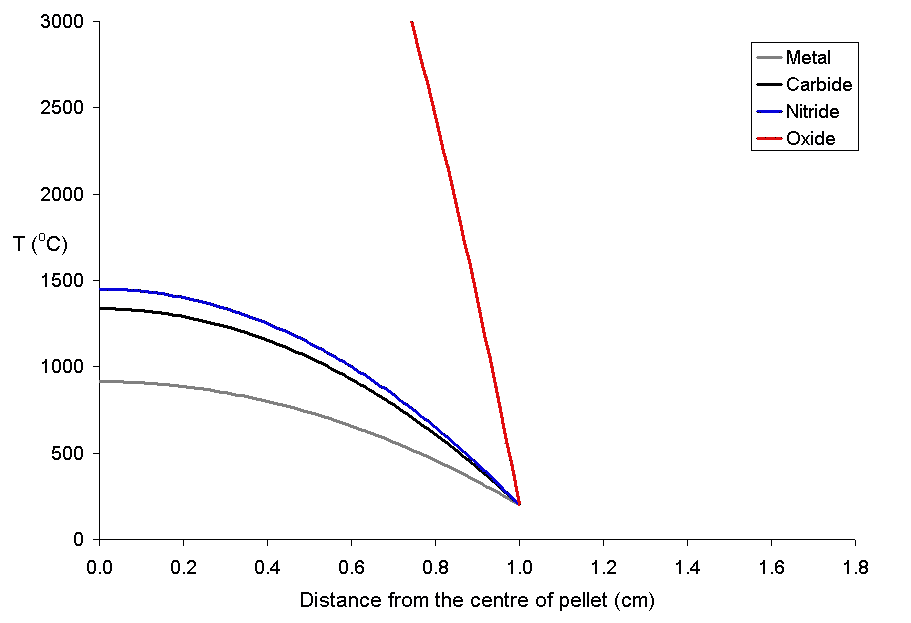
Temperature profile for a 20 mm diameter fuel pellet with a power density of 1 kW per cubic meter. The fuels other than uranium dioxide are not compromised.

The nuclear chemistry associated with the nuclear fuel cycle can be divided into two main areas; one area is concerned with operation under the intended conditions while the other area is concerned with maloperation conditions where some alteration from the normal operating conditions has occurred or (more rarely) an accident is occurring.

The releases of radioactivity from normal operations are the small planned releases from uranium ore processing, enrichment, power reactors, reprocessing plants and waste stores. These can be in different chemical/physical form from releases which could occur under accident conditions. In addition the isotope signature of a hypothetical accident may be very different from that of a planned normal operational discharge of radioactivity to the environment.

Just because a radioisotope is released it does not mean it will enter a human and then cause harm. For instance, the migration of radioactivity can be altered by the binding of the radioisotope to the surfaces of soil particles. For example, caesium (Cs) binds tightly to clay minerals such as illite and montmorillonite, hence it remains in the upper layers of soil where it can be accessed by plants with shallow roots (such as grass). Hence grass and mushrooms can carry a considerable amount of ^{137}Cs which can be transferred to humans through the food chain. But ^{137}Cs is not able to migrate quickly through most soils and thus is unlikely to contaminate well water. Colloids of soil minerals can migrate through soil so simple binding of a metal to the surfaces of soil particles does not completely fix the metal.

According to Jiří Hála's text book, the distribution coefficient K_{d} is the ratio of the soil's radioactivity (Bq g^{−1}) to that of the soil water (Bq ml^{−1}). If the radioisotope is tightly bound to the minerals in the soil, then less radioactivity can be absorbed by crops and grass growing on the soil.

- Cs-137 K_{d} = 1000
- Pu-239 K_{d} = 10000 to 100000
- Sr-90 K_{d} = 80 to 150
- I-131 K_{d} = 0.007 to 50

In dairy farming, one of the best countermeasures against ^{137}Cs is to mix up the soil by deeply ploughing the soil. This has the effect of putting the ^{137}Cs out of reach of the shallow roots of the grass, hence the level of radioactivity in the grass will be lowered. Also after a nuclear war or serious accident, the removal of top few cm of soil and its burial in a shallow trench will reduce the long-term gamma dose to humans due to ^{137}Cs, as the gamma photons will be attenuated by their passage through the soil.

Even after the radioactive element arrives at the roots of the plant, the metal may be rejected by the biochemistry of the plant. The details of the uptake of ^{90}Sr and ^{137}Cs into sunflowers grown under hydroponic conditions has been reported. The caesium was found in the leaf veins, in the stem and in the apical leaves. It was found that 12% of the caesium entered the plant, and 20% of the strontium. This paper also reports details of the effect of potassium, ammonium and calcium ions on the uptake of the radioisotopes.

In livestock farming, an important countermeasure against ^{137}Cs is to feed animals a small amount of Prussian blue. This iron potassium cyanide compound acts as an ion-exchanger. The cyanide is so tightly bonded to the iron that it is safe for a human to eat several grams of Prussian blue per day. The Prussian blue reduces the biological half-life (different from the nuclear half-life) of the caesium. The physical or nuclear half-life of ^{137}Cs is about 30 years. This is a constant which can not be changed but the biological half-life is not a constant. It will change according to the nature and habits of the organism for which it is expressed. Caesium in humans normally has a biological half-life of between one and four months. An added advantage of the Prussian blue is that the caesium which is stripped from the animal in the droppings is in a form which is not available to plants. Hence it prevents the caesium from being recycled. The form of Prussian blue required for the treatment of humans or animals is a special grade. Attempts to use the pigment grade used in paints have not been successful. (Note: Note that a source of data on the subject of caesium in Chernobyl fallout exists at (Ukrainian Research Institute for Agricultural Radiology).)

==== Release of radioactivity from fuel during normal use and accidents ====
The IAEA assume that under normal operation the coolant of a water-cooled reactor will contain some radioactivity but during a reactor accident the coolant radioactivity level may rise. The IAEA states that under a series of different conditions different amounts of the core inventory can be released from the fuel, the four conditions the IAEA consider are normal operation, a spike in coolant activity due to a sudden shutdown/loss of pressure (core remains covered with water), a cladding failure resulting in the release of the activity in the fuel/cladding gap (this could be due to the fuel being uncovered by the loss of water for 15–30 minutes where the cladding reached a temperature of 650–1250 °C) or a melting of the core (the fuel will have to be uncovered for at least 30 minutes, and the cladding would reach a temperature in excess of 1650 °C).

Based upon the assumption that a Pressurized water reactor contains 300 tons of water, and that the activity of the fuel of a 1 GWe reactor is as the IAEA predicts, then the coolant activity after an accident such as the Three Mile Island accident (where a core is uncovered and then recovered with water) can be predicted.

===== Releases from reprocessing under normal conditions =====
It is normal to allow used fuel to stand after the irradiation to allow the short-lived and radiotoxic iodine isotopes to decay away. In one experiment in the US, fresh fuel which had not been allowed to decay was reprocessed (the Green run) to investigate the effects of a large iodine release from the reprocessing of short cooled fuel. It is normal in reprocessing plants to scrub the off gases from the dissolver to prevent the emission of iodine. In addition to the emission of iodine the noble gases and tritium are released from the fuel when it is dissolved. It has been proposed that by voloxidation (heating the fuel in a furnace under oxidizing conditions) the majority of the tritium can be recovered from the fuel.

A paper was written on the radioactivity in oysters found in the Irish Sea. These were found by gamma spectroscopy to contain ^{141}Ce, ^{144}Ce, ^{103}Ru, ^{106}Ru, ^{137}Cs, ^{95}Zr and ^{95}Nb. Additionally, a zinc activation product (^{65}Zn) was found, which is thought to be due to the corrosion of magnox fuel cladding in spent fuel pools. It is likely that the modern releases of all these isotopes from the Windscale event is smaller.

=== On-load reactors ===
Some reactor designs, such as RBMKs or CANDU reactors, can be refueled without being shut down. This is achieved through the use of many small pressure tubes to contain the fuel and coolant, as opposed to one large pressure vessel as in pressurized water reactor (PWR) or boiling water reactor (BWR) designs. Each tube can be individually isolated and refueled by an operator-controlled fueling machine, typically at a rate of up to 8 channels per day out of roughly 400 in CANDU reactors. On-load refueling allows for the optimal fuel reloading problem to be dealt with continuously, leading to more efficient use of fuel. This increase in efficiency is partially offset by the added complexity of having hundreds of pressure tubes and the fueling machines to service them.

=== Interim storage ===
After its operating cycle, the reactor is shut down for refueling. The fuel discharged at that time (spent fuel) is stored either at the reactor site (commonly in a spent fuel pool) or potentially in a common facility away from reactor sites. If on-site pool storage capacity is exceeded, it may be desirable to store the now cooled aged fuel in modular dry storage facilities known as Independent Spent Fuel Storage Installations (ISFSI) at the reactor site or at a facility away from the site. The spent fuel rods are usually stored in water or boric acid, which provides both cooling (the spent fuel continues to generate decay heat as a result of residual radioactive decay) and shielding to protect the environment from residual ionizing radiation, although after at least a year of cooling they may be moved to dry cask storage.

=== Reprocessing ===
Spent fuel discharged from reactors contains appreciable quantities of fissile (U-235 and Pu-239), fertile (U-238), and other radioactive materials, including reaction poisons, which is why the fuel had to be removed. These fissile and fertile materials can be chemically separated and recovered from the spent fuel. The recovered uranium and plutonium can, if economic and institutional conditions permit, be recycled for use as nuclear fuel. This is currently not done for civilian spent nuclear fuel in the United States, however it is done in Russia and France . Russia aims to maximise recycling of fissile materials from used fuel. Hence reprocessing used fuel is a basic practice, with reprocessed uranium being recycled and plutonium used in MOX, at present only for fast reactors.

Mixed oxide, or MOX fuel, is a blend of reprocessed uranium and plutonium and depleted uranium which behaves similarly, although not identically, to the enriched uranium feed for which most nuclear reactors were designed. MOX fuel is an alternative to low-enriched uranium (LEU) fuel used in the light water reactors which predominate nuclear power generation.

Currently, plants in Europe are reprocessing spent fuel from utilities in Europe and Japan. Reprocessing of spent commercial-reactor nuclear fuel is currently not permitted in the United States due to the perceived danger of nuclear proliferation. The Bush Administration's Global Nuclear Energy Partnership proposed that the U.S. form an international partnership to see spent nuclear fuel reprocessed in a way that renders the plutonium in it usable for nuclear fuel but not for nuclear weapons.

=== Partitioning and transmutation ===
As an alternative to the disposal of the PUREX raffinate in glass or Synroc matrix, the most radiotoxic elements could be removed through advanced reprocessing. After separation, the minor actinides and some long-lived fission products could be converted to short-lived or stable isotopes by either neutron or photon irradiation. This is called transmutation. Sustained international cooperation, decades of research and substantial investments are required before partitioning and transmutation (P&T) reaches a mature industrial scale where its safety and economical feasibility can be demonstrated.

=== Waste disposal ===
Actinides and fission products by half-life
Actinides by decay chain				Half-life range (a)	Fission products of ^{235}U by yield
4n (Thorium)	4n + 1 (Neptunium)	4n + 2 (Radium)	4n + 3 (Actinium)	Half-life range (a)	4.5–7%	0.04–1.25%	<0.001%
^{228}Ra^{№}				4–6 a		^{155}Eu^{þ}
^{248}Bk				> 9 a
^{244}Cm^{ƒ}	^{241}Pu^{ƒ}	^{250}Cf	^{227}Ac^{№}	10–29 a	^{90}Sr	^{85}Kr	^{113m}Cd^{þ}
^{232}U^{ƒ}		^{238}Pu^{ƒ}	^{243}Cm^{ƒ}	29–97 a	^{137}Cs	^{151}Sm^{þ}	^{121m}Sn
	^{249}Cf^{ƒ}	^{242m}Am^{ƒ}		141–351 a	No fission products have a half-life in the range of 100 a–210 ka ...
	^{241}Am^{ƒ}		^{251}Cf^{ƒ}	430–900 a	No fission products have a half-life in the range of 100 a–210 ka ...
		^{226}Ra^{№}	^{247}Bk	1.3–1.6 ka	No fission products have a half-life in the range of 100 a–210 ka ...
^{240}Pu	^{229}Th	^{246}Cm^{ƒ}	^{243}Am^{ƒ}	4.7–7.4 ka	No fission products have a half-life in the range of 100 a–210 ka ...
	^{245}Cm^{ƒ}	^{250}Cm		8.3–8.5 ka	No fission products have a half-life in the range of 100 a–210 ka ...
			^{239}Pu^{ƒ}	24.1 ka	No fission products have a half-life in the range of 100 a–210 ka ...
		^{230}Th^{№}	^{231}Pa^{№}	32–76 ka	No fission products have a half-life in the range of 100 a–210 ka ...
^{236}Np^{ƒ}	^{233}U^{ƒ}	^{234}U^{№}		150–250 ka	^{99}Tc^{₡}	^{126}Sn
^{248}Cm		^{242}Pu		327–375 ka		^{79}Se^{₡}
				1.33 Ma	^{135}Cs^{₡}
	^{237}Np^{ƒ}			1.61–6.5 Ma	^{93}Zr	^{107}Pd
^{236}U			^{247}Cm^{ƒ}	15–24 Ma		^{129}I^{₡}
^{244}Pu				80 Ma	... nor beyond 15.7 Ma
^{232}Th^{№}		^{238}U^{№}	^{235}U^{ƒ№}	0.7–14.1 Ga	... nor beyond 15.7 Ma
₡, has thermal neutron capture cross section in the range of 8–50 barns; ƒ, fissile; №, primarily a naturally occurring radioactive material (NORM); þ, neutron poison (thermal neutron capture cross section greater than 3k barns)

A current concern in the nuclear power field is the safe disposal and isolation of either spent fuel from reactors or, if the reprocessing option is used, wastes from reprocessing plants. These materials must be isolated from the biosphere until the radioactivity contained in them has diminished to a safe level. In the U.S., under the Nuclear Waste Policy Act of 1982 as amended, the Department of Energy has responsibility for the development of the waste disposal system for spent nuclear fuel and high-level radioactive waste. Current plans call for the ultimate disposal of the wastes in solid form in a licensed deep, stable geologic structure called a deep geological repository. The Department of Energy chose Yucca Mountain as the location for the repository. Its opening has been repeatedly delayed. Since 1999 thousands of nuclear waste shipments have been stored at the Waste Isolation Pilot Plant in New Mexico.

Fast-neutron reactors can fission all actinides, while the thorium fuel cycle produces low levels of transuranics. Unlike LWRs, in principle these fuel cycles could recycle their plutonium and minor actinides and leave only fission products and activation products as waste. The highly radioactive medium-lived fission products Cs-137 and Sr-90 diminish by a factor of 10 each century; while the long-lived fission products have relatively low radioactivity, often compared favorably to that of the original uranium ore.

Horizontal drillhole disposal describes proposals to drill over one kilometer vertically, and two kilometers horizontally in the Earth's crust, for the purpose of disposing of high-level waste forms such as spent nuclear fuel, Caesium-137, or Strontium-90. After the emplacement and the retrievability period, drillholes would be backfilled and sealed. A series of tests of the technology were carried out in November 2018 and then again publicly in January 2019 by a U.S. based private company. The test demonstrated the emplacement of a test-canister in a horizontal drillhole and retrieval of the same canister. There was no actual high-level waste used in this test.

== Fuel cycles ==
Although the most common terminology is fuel cycle, some argue that the term fuel chain is more accurate, because the spent fuel is never fully recycled. Spent fuel includes fission products, which generally must be treated as waste, as well as uranium, plutonium, and other transuranic elements. Where plutonium is recycled, it is normally reused once in light water reactors, although fast reactors could lead to more complete recycling of plutonium.

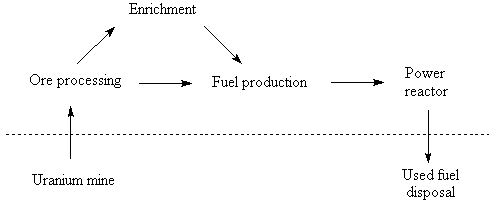
A once through (or open) fuel cycle

=== Once-through nuclear fuel cycle ===
Not a cycle per se, fuel is used once and then sent to storage without further processing save additional packaging to provide for better isolation from the biosphere. This method is favored by six countries: the United States, Canada, Sweden, Finland, Spain and South Africa. Some countries, notably Finland, Sweden and Canada, have designed repositories to permit future recovery of the material should the need arise, while others plan for permanent sequestration in a geological repository like the Yucca Mountain nuclear waste repository in the United States.

=== Plutonium cycle ===
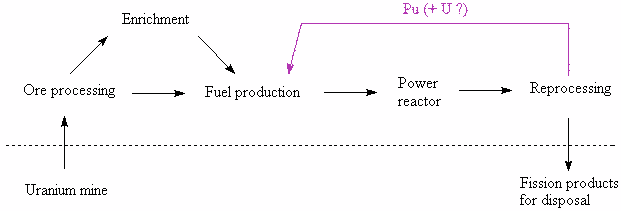
A fuel cycle in which plutonium is used for fuel

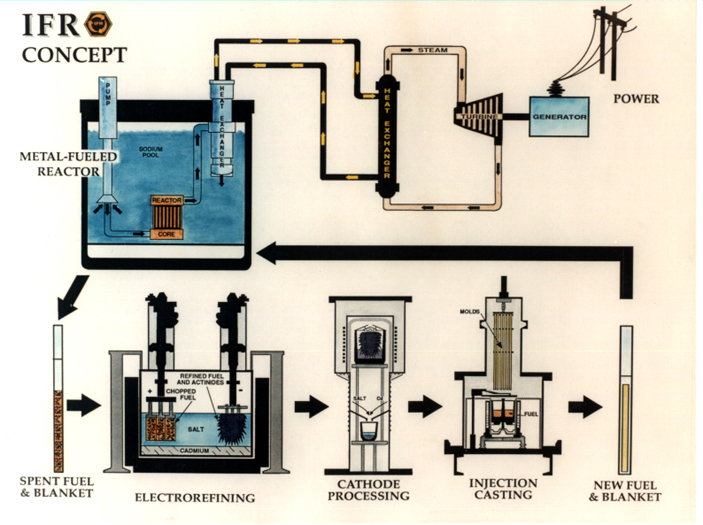
The integral fast reactor concept (color), with the reactor above and integrated pyroprocessing fuel cycle below. A more detailed animation and demonstration is available.

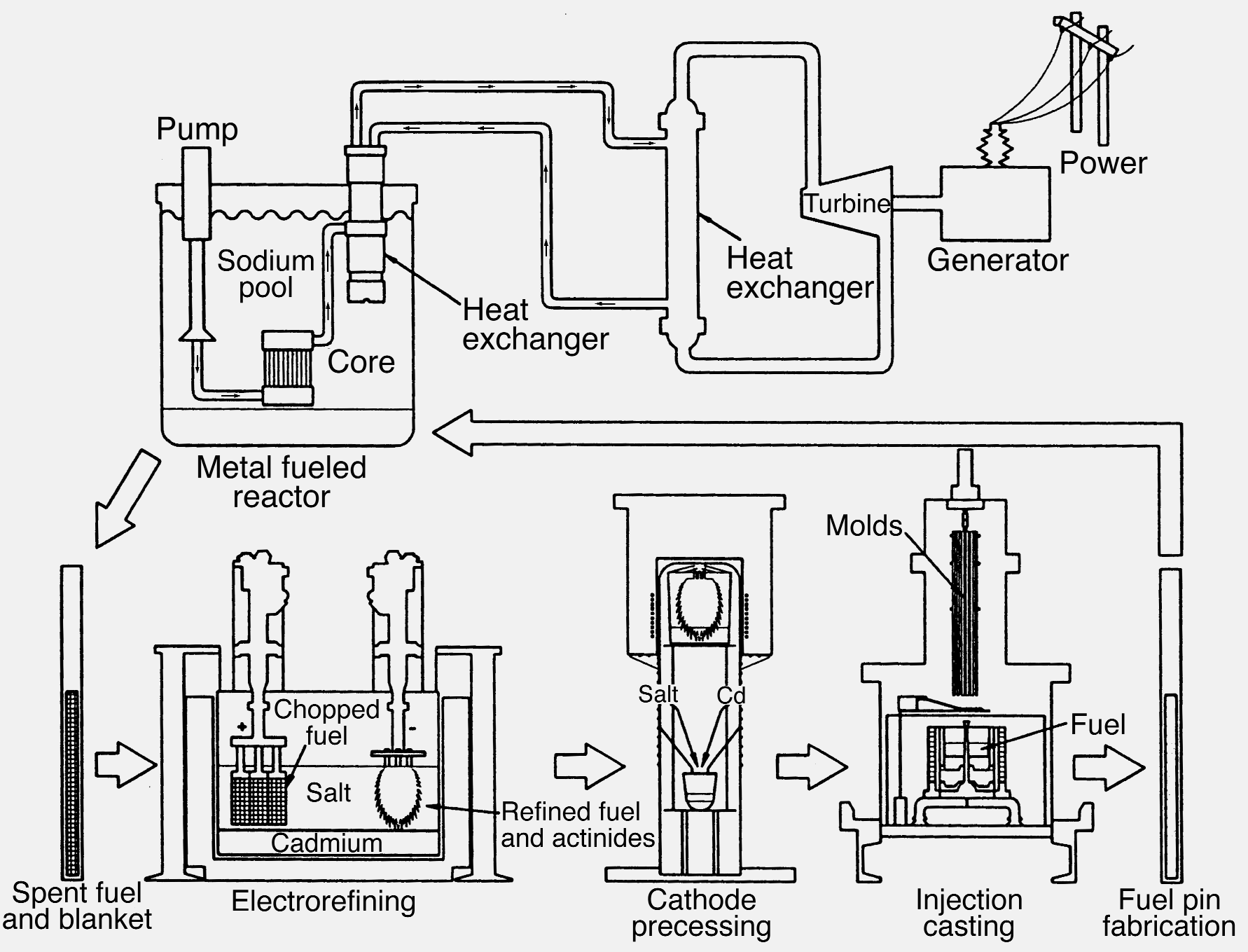
IFR concept (Black and White with clearer text)

Several countries, including Japan, Switzerland, and previously Spain and Germany, are using or have used the reprocessing services offered by Areva NC and previously THORP. Fission products, minor actinides, activation products, and reprocessed uranium are separated from the reactor-grade plutonium, which can then be fabricated into MOX fuel. Because the proportion of the non-fissile even-mass isotopes of plutonium rises with each pass through the cycle, there are currently no plans to reuse plutonium from used MOX fuel for a third pass in a thermal reactor. If fast reactors become available, they may be able to burn these, or almost any other actinide isotopes.

The use of a medium-scale reprocessing facility onsite, and the use of pyroprocessing rather than the present day aqueous reprocessing, is claimed to potentially be able to considerably reduce the nuclear proliferation potential or possible diversion of fissile material as the processing facility is in-situ. Similarly as plutonium is not separated on its own in the pyroprocessing cycle, rather all actinides are "electro-won" or "refined" from the spent fuel, the plutonium is never separated on its own, instead it comes over into the new fuel mixed with gamma and alpha emitting actinides, species that "self-protect" it in numerous possible thief scenarios.

Beginning in 2016 Russia has been testing and is now deploying Remix Fuel in which the spent nuclear fuel is put through a process like Pyroprocessing that separates the reactor Grade Plutonium and remaining Uranium from the fission products and fuel cladding. This mixed metal is then combined with a small quantity of medium enriched Uranium with approximately 17% U-235 concentration to make a new combined metal oxide fuel with 1% Reactor Grade plutonium and a U-235 concentration of 4%. These fuel rods are suitable for use in standard PWR reactors as the Plutonium content is no higher than that which exists at the end of cycle in the spent nuclear fuel. As of February 2020 Russia was deploying this fuel in some of their fleet of VVER reactors.

=== Minor actinides recycling ===
It has been proposed that in addition to the use of plutonium, the minor actinides could be used in a critical power reactor. Tests are already being conducted in which americium is being used as a fuel.

A number of reactor designs, like the Integral Fast Reactor, have been designed for this rather different fuel cycle. In principle, it should be possible to derive energy from the fission of any actinide nucleus. With a careful reactor design, all the actinides in the fuel can be consumed, leaving only lighter elements with short half-lives. Whereas this has been done in prototype plants, no such reactor has ever been operated on a large scale.

It so happens that the neutron cross-section of many actinides decreases with increasing neutron energy, but the ratio of fission to simple activation (neutron capture) changes in favour of fission as the neutron energy increases. Thus with a sufficiently high neutron energy, it should be possible to destroy even curium without the generation of the transcurium metals. This could be very desirable as it would make it significantly easier to reprocess and handle the actinide fuel.

One promising alternative from this perspective is an accelerator-driven sub-critical reactor / subcritical reactor. Here a beam of either protons (United States and European designs) or electrons (Japanese design) is directed into a target. In the case of protons, very fast neutrons will spall off the target, while in the case of the electrons, very high energy photons will be generated. These high-energy neutrons and photons will then be able to cause the fission of the heavy actinides.

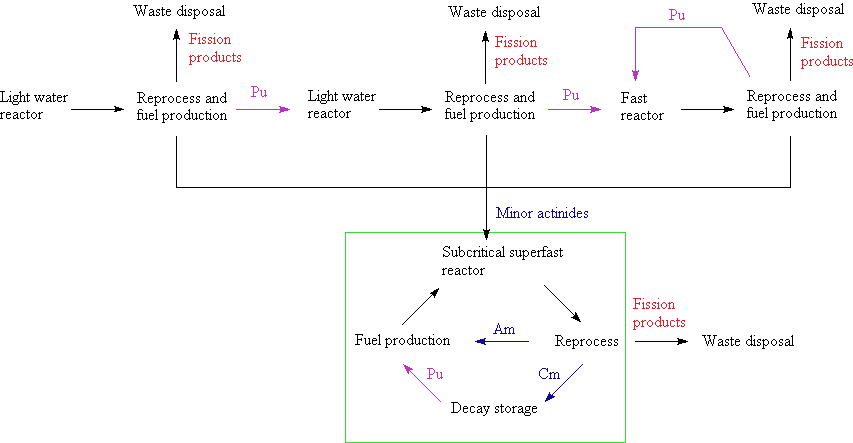
A pair of fuel cycles in which uranium and plutonium are kept separate from the minor actinides. The minor actinide cycle is kept within the green box.

Such reactors compare very well to other neutron sources in terms of neutron energy:

- Thermal 0 to 100 eV
- Epithermal 100 eV to 100 keV
- Fast (from nuclear fission) 100 keV to 3 MeV
- DD fusion 2.5 MeV
- DT fusion 14 MeV
- Accelerator driven core 200 MeV (lead driven by 1.6 GeV protons)

As an alternative, the curium-244, with a half-life of 18 years, could be left to decay into plutonium-240 before being used in fuel in a fast reactor.

==== Fuel or targets for this actinide transmutation ====
To date the nature of the fuel (targets) for actinide transformation has not been chosen.

If actinides are transmuted in a Subcritical reactor, it is likely that the fuel will have to be able to tolerate more thermal cycles than conventional fuel. Due to current particle accelerators not being optimized for long continuous operation at least the first generation of accelerator-driven sub-critical reactor is unlikely to be able to maintain a constant operation period for equally long times as a critical reactor, and each time the accelerator stops then the fuel will cool down.

On the other hand, if actinides are destroyed using a fast reactor, such as an Integral Fast Reactor, then the fuel will most likely not be exposed to many more thermal cycles than in a normal power station.

Depending on the matrix the process can generate more transuranics from the matrix. This could either be viewed as good (generate more fuel) or can be viewed as bad (generation of more radiotoxic transuranic elements). A series of different matrices exists which can control this production of heavy actinides.

Fissile nuclei (such as ^{233}U, ^{235}U, and ^{239}Pu) respond well to delayed neutrons and are thus important to keep a critical reactor stable; this limits the amount of minor actinides that can be destroyed in a critical reactor. As a consequence, it is important that the chosen matrix allows the reactor to keep the ratio of fissile to non-fissile nuclei high, as this enables it to destroy the long-lived actinides safely. In contrast, the power output of a sub-critical reactor is limited by the intensity of the driving particle accelerator, and thus it need not contain any uranium or plutonium at all. In such a system, it may be preferable to have an inert matrix that does not produce additional long-lived isotopes. Having a low fraction of delayed neutrons is not only not a problem in a subcritical reactor, it may even be slightly advantageous as criticality can be brought closer to unity, while still staying subcritical.

===== Actinides in an inert matrix =====
The actinides will be mixed with a metal which will not form more actinides; for instance, an alloy of actinides in a solid such as zirconia could be used.

The raison d’être of the Initiative for Inert Matrix Fuel (IMF) is to contribute to Research and Development studies on inert matrix fuels that could be used to utilise, reduce and dispose both weapon- and light water reactor-grade plutonium excesses. In addition to plutonium, the amounts of minor actinides are also increasing. These actinides have to be consequently disposed in a safe, ecological and economical way. The promising strategy that consists of using plutonium and minor actinides using a once-through fuel approach within existing commercial nuclear power reactors e.g. US, European, Russian or Japanese Light Water Reactors (LWR), Canadian Pressured Heavy Water Reactors, or in future transmutation units, has been emphasised since the beginning of the initiative. The approach, which makes use of inert matrix fuel is now studied by several groups in the world. This option has the advantage of reducing the plutonium amounts and potentially minor actinide contents prior to geological disposal. The second option is based on using a uranium-free fuel leachable for reprocessing and by following a multi-recycling strategy. In both cases, the advanced fuel material produces energy while consuming plutonium or the minor actinides. This material must, however, be robust. The selected material must be the result of a careful system study including inert matrix – burnable absorbent – fissile material as minimum components and with the addition of stabiliser. This yields a single-phase solid solution or more simply if this option is not selected a composite inert matrix–fissile component. In screening studies pre-selected elements were identified as suitable. In the 90s an IMF once through strategy was adopted considering the following properties:

- neutron properties i.e. low absorption cross-section, optimal constant reactivity, suitable Doppler coefficient,
- phase stability, chemical inertness, and compatibility,
- acceptable thermo-physical properties i.e. heat capacity, thermal conductivity,
- good behaviour under irradiation i.e. phase stability, minimum swelling,
- retention of fission products or residual actinides, and
- optimal properties after irradiation with insolubility for once through then out.

This once-through then out strategy may be adapted as a last cycle after multi-recycling if the fission yield is not large enough, in which case the following property is required good leaching properties for reprocessing and multi-recycling.

===== Actinides in a thorium matrix =====
Upon neutron bombardment, thorium can be converted to uranium-233. ^{233}U is fissile, and has a larger fission cross section than both ^{235}U and ^{238}U, and thus it is far less likely to produce higher actinides through neutron capture.

===== Actinides in a uranium matrix =====
If the actinides are incorporated into a uranium-metal or uranium-oxide matrix, then the neutron capture of ^{238}U is likely to generate new plutonium-239. An advantage of mixing the actinides with uranium and plutonium is that the large fission cross sections of ^{235}U and ^{239}Pu for the less energetic delayed neutrons could make the reaction stable enough to be carried out in a critical fast reactor, which is likely to be both cheaper and simpler than an accelerator driven system.

===== Mixed matrix =====
It is also possible to create a matrix made from a mix of the above-mentioned materials. This is most commonly done in fast reactors where one may wish to keep the breeding ratio of new fuel high enough to keep powering the reactor, but still low enough that the generated actinides can be safely destroyed without transporting them to another site. One way to do this is to use fuel where actinides and uranium is mixed with inert zirconium, producing fuel elements with the desired properties.

=== Uranium cycle in renewable mode ===
To fulfill the conditions required for a nuclear renewable energy concept, one has to explore a combination of processes going from the front end of the nuclear fuel cycle to the fuel production and the energy conversion using specific fluid fuels and reactors, as reported by Degueldre et al. (2019). Extraction of uranium from a diluted fluid ore such as seawater has been studied in various countries worldwide. This extraction should be carried out parsimoniously, as suggested by Degueldre (2017). An extraction rate of kilotons of U per year over centuries would not modify significantly the equilibrium concentration of uranium in the oceans (3.3 ppb). This equilibrium results from the input of 10 kilotons of U per year by river waters and its scavenging on the sea floor from the 1.37 exatons of water in the oceans. For a renewable uranium extraction, the use of a specific biomass material is suggested to adsorb uranium and subsequently other transition metals. The uranium loading on the biomass would be around 100 mg per kg. After contact time, the loaded material would be dried and burned (CO_{2} neutral) with heat conversion into electricity. The uranium ‘burning’ in a molten salt fast reactor helps to optimize the energy conversion by burning all actinide isotopes with an excellent yield for producing a maximum amount of thermal energy from fission and converting it into electricity. This optimisation can be reached by reducing the moderation and the fission product concentration in the liquid fuel/coolant. These effects can be achieved by using a maximum amount of actinides and a minimum amount of alkaline/earth alkaline elements yielding a harder neutron spectrum. Under these optimal conditions the consumption of natural uranium would be 7 tons per year and per gigawatt (GW) of produced electricity. The coupling of uranium extraction from the sea and its optimal utilisation in a molten salt fast reactor should allow nuclear energy to gain the label renewable. In addition, the amount of seawater used by a nuclear power plant to cool the last coolant fluid and the turbine would be ~2.1 giga tons per year for a fast molten salt reactor, corresponding to 7 tons of natural uranium extractable per year. This practice justifies the label renewable.

=== Thorium cycle ===
In the thorium fuel cycle thorium-232 absorbs a neutron in either a fast or thermal reactor. The thorium-233 beta decays to protactinium-233 and then to uranium-233, which in turn is used as fuel. Hence, like uranium-238, thorium-232 is a fertile material.

$$\ce{\overset{neutron}{n} + ^{232}_{90}Th -> ^{233}_{90}Th ->[\beta^-] ^{233}_{91}Pa ->[\beta^-] \overset{fuel}{^{233}_{92}U}}$$

After starting the reactor with existing U-233 or some other fissile material such as U-235 or Pu-239, a breeding cycle similar to but more efficient (Note: See thorium fuel cycle) than that with U-238 and plutonium can be created. The Th-232 absorbs a neutron to become Th-233 which quickly decays to protactinium-233. Protactinium-233 in turn decays with a half-life of 27 days to U-233. In some molten salt reactor designs, the Pa-233 is extracted and protected from neutrons (which could transform it to Pa-234 and then to U-234), until it has decayed to U-233. This is done in order to improve the breeding ratio which is low compared to fast reactors.

Thorium is at least 4-5 times more abundant in nature than all of uranium isotopes combined; thorium is fairly evenly spread around Earth with a lot of countries (Note: See Thorium occurrence for discussion of abundance.) having huge supplies of it; preparation of thorium fuel does not require difficult and expensive enrichment processes; the thorium fuel cycle creates mainly Uranium-233 contaminated with Uranium-232 which makes it harder to use in a normal, pre-assembled nuclear weapon which is stable over long periods of time (unfortunately drawbacks are much lower for immediate use weapons or where final assembly occurs just prior to usage time); elimination of at least the transuranic portion of the nuclear waste problem is possible in MSR and other breeder reactor designs.

One of the earliest efforts to use a thorium fuel cycle took place at Oak Ridge National Laboratory in the 1960s. An experimental reactor was built based on molten salt reactor technology to study the feasibility of such an approach, using thorium fluoride salt kept hot enough to be liquid, thus eliminating the need for fabricating fuel elements. This effort culminated in the Molten-Salt Reactor Experiment that used ^{232}Th as the fertile material and ^{233}U as the fissile fuel. Due to a lack of funding, the MSR program was discontinued in 1976.

Thorium was first used commercially in the Indian Point Unit 1 reactor which began operation in 1962. The cost of recovering U-233 from the spent fuel was deemed uneconomical, since less than 1% of the thorium was converted to U-233. The plant's owner switched to uranium fuel, which was used until the reactor was permanently shut down in 1974.

=== Current industrial activity ===
Currently the only isotopes used as nuclear fuel are uranium-235 (U-235), uranium-238 (U-238) and plutonium-239, although the proposed thorium fuel cycle has advantages. Some modern reactors, with minor modifications, can use thorium. Thorium is approximately three times more abundant in the Earth's crust than uranium (and 550 times more abundant than uranium-235). There has been little exploration for thorium resources, and thus the proven reserves are comparatively small. Thorium is more plentiful than uranium in some countries, notably India. The main thorium-bearing mineral, monazite is currently mostly of interest due to its content of rare earth elements and most of the thorium is simply dumped on spoils tips similar to uranium mine tailings. As mining for rare earth elements occurs mainly in China and as it is not associated in the public consciousness with the nuclear fuel cycle, Thorium-containing mine tailings – despite their radioactivity – are not commonly seen as a nuclear waste issue and are not treated as such by regulators.

Virtually all ever deployed heavy water reactors and some graphite-moderated reactors can use natural uranium, but the vast majority of the world's reactors require enriched uranium, in which the ratio of U-235 to U-238 is increased. In civilian reactors, the enrichment is increased to 3-5% U-235 and 95% U-238, but in naval reactors there is as much as 93% U-235. The fissile content in spent fuel from most light water reactors is high enough to allow its use as fuel for reactors capable of using natural uranium based fuel. However, this would require at least mechanical and/or thermal reprocessing (forming the spent fuel into a new fuel assembly) and is thus not currently widely done.

The term nuclear fuel is not normally used in respect to fusion power, which fuses isotopes of hydrogen into helium to release energy.

== See also ==
- Deep Borehole
- Deep Geological Repository
- Horizontal Drillhole
- Nuclear fuel cycle in France
