= Gravity Reactor =

The Gravity Reactor is a proposed small modular reactor design for a 15 MWe nuclear power plant which would sit at the bottom of a mile-deep, 40 inch diameter vertical borehole filled with water. The water and depth supplies the pressure used in conventional pressurized water reactors (about 2,200 psi) without the cost of a large steel pressure vessel, and eliminates the need for a thick concrete containment building. It would use four conventional LEU fuel assemblies (17 x 17 fuel pins each), and rely on natural convection for the primary coolant loop (which moves heat from the nuclear reactor core to the heat exchanger just above the core), and natural convection to bring the secondary coolant from the heat exchanger to the surface to run a steam turbine for electricity generation.

It was conceived by Richard A. Muller and his daughter Liz Muller, who started a company to commercialize the concept, Deep Fission. The startup founded in 2023 and based in Berkeley, has raised $150 million by July 2026. The company is a participant in the U.S. Department of Energy’s (DOE) Reactor Pilot Program, a federal program designed to expedite testing and licensing of new designs. The company said that their plants could cost 80% less than traditional nuclear plants, and provide a levelized cost of electricity (LCOE) of 5 to 7 cents per kWh.

They started drilling holes for a pilot project during the first quarter of 2026 in Parsons, Kansas.
