= Berkeley Earth =

Climatological research institute

- Berkeley Earth logo
- Founded: 2010
- Founder: Richard Muller and Elizabeth Muller
- Purpose: Climate science, education/communication and global warming mitigation
- Location: Berkeley, California
- Region served: Global
- Method: Scientific analysis
- Website: BerkeleyEarth.org
- Formerly called: Berkeley Earth Surface Temperature

Berkeley Earth is a Berkeley, California-based independent 501(c)(3) non-profit focused on land temperature data analysis for climate science. Berkeley Earth was founded in early 2010 (originally called the Berkeley Earth Surface Temperature project) to address the major concerns from outside the scientific community regarding global warming and the instrumental temperature record. The project's stated aim was a "transparent approach, based on data analysis." In February 2013, Berkeley Earth became an independent non-profit. In August 2013, Berkeley Earth was granted 501(c)(3) tax-exempt status by the US government. The primary product is air temperatures over land, but they also produce a global dataset resulting from a merge of their land data with HadSST.

Berkeley Earth founder Richard A. Muller told The Guardian

...we are bringing the spirit of science back to a subject that has become too argumentative and too contentious, ....we are an independent, non-political, non-partisan group. We will gather the data, do the analysis, present the results and make all of it available. There will be no spin, whatever we find. We are doing this because it is the most important project in the world today. Nothing else comes close.

Berkeley Earth has been funded by unrestricted educational grants totaling (as of December 2013) about $1,394,500. Large donors include Lawrence Berkeley National Laboratory, the Charles G. Koch Foundation, the Fund for Innovative Climate and Energy Research (FICER), and the William K. Bowes Jr. Foundation. The donors have no control over how Berkeley Earth conducts the research or what they publish.

The team's preliminary findings, data sets and programs were published beginning in December 2012. The study addressed scientific concerns including the urban heat island effect, poor station quality, and the risk of data selection bias. The Berkeley Earth group concluded that the warming trend is real, that over the past 50 years (between the decades of the 1950s and 2000s) the land surface warmed by 0.91±0.05 °C, and their results mirror those obtained from earlier studies carried out by the U.S. National Oceanic and Atmospheric Administration (NOAA), the Hadley Centre, NASA's Goddard Institute for Space Studies (GISS) Surface Temperature Analysis, and the Climatic Research Unit (CRU) at the University of East Anglia. The study also found that the urban heat island effect and poor station quality did not bias the results obtained from these earlier studies.

== Scientific team and directors ==
Berkeley Earth team members include:

- Richard A. Muller, founder and Scientific Director. Professor of Physics, UCB and Senior Scientist, Lawrence Berkeley National Laboratory. Muller is a member of the JASON Defense Advisory Group who has been critical of other climate temperature studies before this project.
- Elizabeth Muller, Founder and Executive Director
- Robert Rohde, lead scientist. Ph.D. in physics, University of California, Berkeley. Rohde's scientific interests include earth sciences, climatology, and scientific graphics. Rohde is the founder of Global Warming Art.
- Zeke Hausfather, scientist
- Steven Mosher, scientist, co-author of Climategate: The Crutape Letters
- Saul Perlmutter, Nobel Prize-winning astrophysicist at Lawrence Berkeley National Laboratory and Professor of Physics at UCB.
- Arthur H. Rosenfeld, professor of physics at UCB and former California Energy Commissioner. The research he directed at Lawrence Berkeley National Laboratory led to the development of compact fluorescent lamps.
- Jonathan Wurtele, professor of physics
- Will Graser

Former team members

- Sebastian Wickenburg, Ph.D. Candidate in Physics
- Charlotte Wickham, statistical scientist
- Don Groom, physicist
- Robert Jacobsen, Professor of Physics at UCB and an expert in analyses of large data sets.
- David Brillinger, statistical scientist. Professor of Statistics at UCB. A contributor to the theory of time series analysis.
- Judith Curry, climatologist and Chair of the School of Earth and Atmospheric Sciences at the Georgia Institute of Technology.
- Pamela Hyde, Communications and Project Director
- John Li, Energy Geoscience intern

Board of Directors

- Elizabeth Muller, president and chair, managing partner of Global Shale.
- Will Glaser, Treasurer, founded Pandora Music
- Bill Shireman, Secretary "He develops profitable business strategies that drive pollution down and profits up."
- Richard Muller, Board Director
- Art Rosenfeld, Board Director
- Marlan W. Downey, Board Director, Former President of the international subsidiary of Shell Oil; founder of Roxanna Oil; former president of Arco International
- Jim Boettcher, Board Director; investments

== Initial results ==
After completing the analysis of the full land temperature data set, consisting of more than 1.6 billion temperature measurements dating back to the 1800s from 15 sources around the world, and originating from more than 39,000 temperature stations worldwide, the group submitted four papers for peer-review and publication in scientific journals. The Berkeley Earth study did not assess temperature changes in the oceans, nor try to assess how much of the observed warming is due to human action. The Berkeley Earth team also released the preliminary findings to the public on October 20, 2011, in order to promote additional scrutiny. The data sets and programs used to analyze the information, and the papers undergoing peer review were also made available to the public.

The Berkeley Earth study addressed scientific concerns raised by skeptics including urban heat island effect, poor station quality, and the risk of data selection bias. The team's initial conclusions are the following:

- The urban heat island effect and poor station quality did not bias the results obtained from earlier studies carried out by the U.S. National Oceanic and Atmospheric Administration (NOAA), the Hadley Centre and NASA's GISS Surface Temperature Analysis. The team found that the urban heat island effect is locally large and real, but does not contribute significantly to the average land temperature rise, as the planet's urban regions amount to less than 1% of the land area. The study also found that while stations considered "poor" might be less accurate, they recorded the same average warming trend.
- Global temperatures closely matched previous studies from NASA GISS, NOAA and the Hadley Centre, that have found global warming trends. The Berkeley Earth group estimates that over the past 50 years the land surface warmed by 0.911 °C, just 2% less than NOAA's estimate. The team scientific director stated that "...this confirms that these studies were done carefully and that potential biases identified by climate change sceptics did not seriously affect their conclusions."
- About 1/3 of temperature sites around the world with records of 70 years or longer reported cooling (including much of the United States and northern Europe). But 2/3 of the sites show warming. Individual temperature histories reported from a single location are frequently noisy and/or unreliable, and it is always necessary to compare and combine many records to understand the true pattern of global warming.
- The Atlantic multidecadal oscillation (AMO) has played a larger role than previously thought. The El Niño-Southern Oscillation (ENSO) is generally thought to be the main reason for inter-annual warming or cooling, but the Berkeley Earth team's analysis found that the global temperature correlates more closely with the state of the Atlantic Multidecadal Oscillation index, which is a measure of sea surface temperature in the north Atlantic.

The Berkeley Earth analysis uses a new methodology and was tested against much of the same data as NOAA and NASA. The group uses an algorithm that attaches an automatic weighting to every data point, according to its consistency with comparable readings. The team claims this approach allows the inclusion of outlandish readings without distorting the result and standard statistical techniques were used to remove outliers. The methodology also avoids traditional procedures that require long, continuous data segments, thus accommodating short sequences, such as those provided by temporary weather stations. This innovation allowed the group to compile an earlier record than its predecessors, starting from 1800, but with a high degree of uncertainty because at the time there were only two weather stations in America, just a few in Europe and one in Asia.

=== Reactions ===
Given project leader Muller's well-publicized concerns regarding the quality of climate change research, other critics anticipated that the Berkeley Earth study would be a vindication of their stance. For example, when the study team was announced, Anthony Watts, a climate change denialist blogger who popularized several of the issues addressed by the Berkeley Earth group study, expressed full confidence in the team's methods:

I'm prepared to accept whatever result they produce, even if it proves my premise wrong. ... [T]he method isn't the madness that we've seen from NOAA, NCDC, GISS, and CRU, and, there aren't any monetary strings attached to the result that I can tell. ... That lack of strings attached to funding, plus the broad mix of people involved especially those who have previous experience in handling large data sets gives me greater confidence in the result being closer to a bona fide ground truth than anything we've seen yet.

— Anthony Watts

When the initial results were released, and found to support the existing consensus, the study was widely decried by deniers. Watts spoke to The New York Times, which wrote: "Mr. Watts ... contended that the study's methodology was flawed because it examined data over 60 years instead of the 30-year-one that was the basis for his research and some other peer-reviewed studies. He also noted that the report had not yet been peer-reviewed and cited spelling errors as proof of sloppiness." Steven Mosher, a co-author of a book critical of climate scientists, also disapproved saying that the study still lacked transparency. He said: "I'm not happy until the code is released and released in a language that people can use freely." Stephen McIntyre, editor of Climate Audit, a climate-skeptics blog, said that "the team deserves credit for going back to the primary data and doing the work" and even though he had not had an opportunity to read the papers in detail, he questioned the analyses of urban heating and weather station quality.

By contrast, the study was well received by Muller's peers in climate science research. James Hansen, a leading climate scientist and head of NASA Goddard Institute for Space Studies commented that he had not yet read the research papers but was glad Muller was looking at the issue. He said "It should help inform those who have honest skepticism about global warming." Phil Jones the director of the Climatic Research Unit (CRU) at the University of East Anglia, said: "I look forward to reading the finalised paper once it has been reviewed and published. These initial findings are very encouraging and echo our own results and our conclusion that the impact of urban heat islands on the overall global temperature is minimal." Michael Mann, director of the Earth System Science Center at Pennsylvania State University, commented that "...they get the same result that everyone else has gotten," and "that said, I think it's at least useful to see that even a critic like Muller, when he takes an honest look, finds that climate science is robust." Peter Thorne, from the Cooperative Institute for Climate and Satellites in North Carolina and chair of the International Surface Temperature Initiative, said: "This takes a very distinct approach to the problem and comes up with the same answer, and that builds confidence that pre-existing estimates are in the right ballpark. There is very substantial value in having multiple groups looking at the same problem in different ways." The ice core research scientist Eric Steig wrote at RealClimate.org that it was unsurprising that Berkeley Earth's results matched previous results so well: "Any of various simple statistical analyses of the freely available data ...show... that it was very very unlikely that the results would change".

== Expanded scope ==
Since the publication of its papers in 2013, Berkeley Earth has broadened its scope. Berkeley Earth has three program areas of work: 1) further scientific investigations on the nature of climate change and extreme weather events, 2) an education and communications program, and 3) evaluation of mitigation efforts in developed and developing economies, with a focus on energy conservation and the use of natural gas as a bridging fuel.

== July 2012 announcement ==
In an op-ed published in The New York Times on 28 July 2012, Muller announced further findings from the project. He said their analysis showed that average global land temperatures had increased by 2.5 °F (1.4 °C) in 250 years, with the increase in the last 50 years being 1.5 °F (0.8 °C), and it seemed likely that this increase was entirely due to human caused greenhouse gas emissions. His opening paragraph stated:

Call me a converted skeptic. Three years ago I identified problems in previous climate studies that, in my mind, threw doubt on the very existence of global warming. Last year, following an intensive research effort involving a dozen scientists, I concluded that global warming was real and that the prior estimates of the rate of warming were correct. I'm now going a step further: Humans are almost entirely the cause.

He said that their findings were stronger than those shown in the IPCC Fourth Assessment Report. Their analysis, set out in five scientific papers now being subjected to scrutiny by others, had used statistical methods which Robert Rohde had developed and had paid particular attention to overcoming issues that skeptics had questioned, including the urban heat island effect, poor station quality, data selection and data adjustment. In the fifth paper which they now made public, they fitted the shape of the record to various forcings including volcanoes, solar activity and sunspots. They found that the shape best matched the curve of the calculated greenhouse effect from human-caused greenhouse gas emissions. Muller said he still found "that much, if not most, of what is attributed to climate change is speculative, exaggerated or just plain wrong. I've analyzed some of the most alarmist claims, and my skepticism about them hasn't changed."

== See also ==
- Global warming controversy
- Scientific consensus on climate change
