= Deep borehole disposal =

Borehole for nuclear waste disposal

Deep borehole disposal (DBD) is the concept of disposing high-level radioactive waste from nuclear reactors in extremely deep boreholes instead of in more traditional deep geological repositories that are excavated like mines. Deep borehole disposal seeks to place the waste as much as five kilometres (3 mi) beneath the surface of the Earth and relies primarily on the thickness of the natural geological barrier to safely isolate the waste from the biosphere for a very long period of time so that it should not pose a threat to humans and the environment. The concept was originally developed in the 1970s, but in 2014, a proposal for a first experimental borehole was proposed by a consortium headed by Sandia National Laboratories.

The waste would be put into the lower mile of such a hole, within crystalline rock to isolate it from the environment. The upper two miles of the borehole would be filled with protective layers including asphalt, bentonite, concrete, and crushed rock that are expected to protect the environment during geologic time, and the hole would be lined with steel casing.

A pair of proposed test boreholes in the United States were cancelled due to public opposition and lack of funding in 2016 and 2017.

== American deep borehole disposal tests ==
Beginning in 2016, the U.S. Department of Energy funded an experimental borehole extending over 3 miles (5 km) deep, in Rugby, North Dakota. The plans for this five-year project in Rugby did not involve nuclear waste, and instead would have tested other aspects of the borehole concept. However, following protests in North Dakota, a site was proposed in Spink County, South Dakota. After protests in South Dakota prevented the project from moving forward, the Department of Energy scrapped the project. Due to public opposition to the first experimental borehole, in late 2016, the Department of Energy announced a second project which would have involved four sites: two in New Mexico, one in Texas, and one in South Dakota. The early stages of the project required gaining public support before the Department of Energy would have selected a final site for an experimental borehole. On 23 May 2017, the Department of Energy announced that funding priorities had changed and that the deep borehole project was de-funded.

== Illustration ==
In the diagram, the solution domain is used for the purpose of computer modelling of heat flow around the borehole.

Deep borehole nuclear waste disposal works by drilling deep into the Earth's crust

== Details ==
Deep borehole disposal involves drilling a hole about 5 km (3 mi) down into the Earth's crust. High level waste, like spent nuclear fuel, would be sealed in strong steel containers and lowered down the borehole, filling the bottom one or two kilometers of the hole. Current technology limits the diameter of the borehole to less than 50 centimetres (20 in). This means that some waste currently stored in large containers would need to be repackaged in smaller containers. The rest of the borehole is then sealed with appropriate materials, including clay, cement, crushed rock backfill, and asphalt, to ensure a low-permeability barrier between the waste and the land surface. In some concepts, waste may be surrounded by cementitious grout or a highly compacted bentonite buffer matrix to provide improved containment and to reduce the effect of rock movement on the canisters' integrity. A high-temperature scenario involves very young hot waste in the containers which releases enough heat to create a melt zone around the borehole. As the waste decays and cools, the melt zone resolidifies, forming a solid granite sarcophagus around the containers, entombing the waste forever. Under both scenarios, chemically reducing conditions adjacent to the borehole will reduce the transport of most radionuclides.

The deep borehole concept can be applied to any amount of waste. For countries that do not rely on nuclear power plants, their entire inventory of high-level nuclear waste could perhaps be disposed of in a single borehole. Current estimates suggest that spent fuel generated from a single large nuclear power plant operating for multiple decades could be disposed of in fewer than ten boreholes. It is estimated that only 800 boreholes would be sufficient to store the entire existing nuclear waste stockpile of the US. Borehole disposal programs could be terminated at any time with little loss of investment because each borehole is independent. The modular nature of borehole disposal would lend itself to regional, or on-site, disposal of nuclear waste. Another attraction of the deep borehole option is that holes might be drilled and waste emplaced using modifications of existing oil and gas drilling technologies.

Finally, the environmental impact is small. The waste handling facility at the wellhead, plus a temporary security buffer zone, would require about one square kilometer. When the borehole is filled and sealed, the land can be returned to a pristine condition.

== Location of appropriate sites ==
Every state in the U.S. has deep rocks suitable for its own borehole repository. The required crystalline basement rocks are located far below low-density sedimentary rock, drinking water aquifers, and oil and gas deposits. A single borehole would not be big enough to hold all of the nuclear waste produced by a country like the United States, and therefore, a number of them might eventually exist within a single country.

== Speed of construction ==
Scientists at the University of Sheffield in England say that deep boreholes for nuclear waste disposal can be built much more quickly than a traditional deep geological repository that is excavated like an underground mine for waste disposal. The mined repository approach has been pursued unsuccessfully for many years, but the University of Sheffield engineers say that a borehole could be drilled, filled, and sealed in no more than five years, in contrast to the decades required for a mined repository.

== See also ==
- Horizontal drillhole disposal
- Ocean disposal of radioactive waste
- Ocean floor disposal
- Nuclear fuel cycle
- Radioactive waste
- Yucca Mountain nuclear waste repository
- Waste Isolation Pilot Plant
