= Bloom (novel) =

1998 science fiction novel by Wil McCarthy

- Author: Wil McCarthy
- Cover artist: Rick Berry
- Language: English
- Genre: Science fiction novel
- Publisher: Del Rey Books
- Publication date: 1998
- Publication place: United States
- Media type: Print (hardback & paperback) and ebook
- Pages: 303
- ISBN: 0-345-42465-4
- OCLC: 46957484

Bloom, written in 1998, is the fifth science fiction novel written by Wil McCarthy. It was first released as a hardcover in September 1998. Almost a year later, in August 1999, its first mass market edition was published. An ebook reprint was published in 2011.

Bloom is one of Borders' "Best 10 Books of 1998" and is a New York Times Notable Book. The premise of the book is how to handle human technology that has evolved beyond human control.

== Plot summary ==
Bloom is set in the year 2106, in a world where self-replicating nanomachines called "Mycora" have consumed Earth and other planets of the inner Solar System, forcing humankind to eke out a bleak living in the asteroids and Galilean moons. Two groups of humanity are described - The Immunity, who use "ladderdown" technology and augmented reality and live on the moons of Jupiter, and The Gladholders, who use human intelligence amplification and artificial intelligence and live in the asteroid belt. The story begins on Ganymede with an article about a "bloom", or outbreak of Mycora, that serves to emphasize the danger and horror of this technogenic life (TGL). The article is written by Strasheim, the primary narrator character. He is first seen in the office of Chief of Immunology Lottick, the effective ruler of Ganymede, who has called him there for an unknown purpose.

Lottick tells Strasheim that the Mycora have apparently been stealing or assimilating human designed defensive nanotech and may soon develop resistance to the coldness of the outer Solar System, which incites concern. It is planned to send mission to drop TGL detectors onto the polar ice caps of Mars, Earth, and the Moon, and Lottick asks Strasheim to go along as a reporter. For the longer term, a starship is being constructed to colonize other star systems before the Mycora spreads further outwards.

Strasheim agrees, and goes to meet the other crew-members and inspect the ship, which is called the Louis Pasteur. The ship is technologically camouflaged to protect the crew against Mycora. A terrorist attack releases a Mycora bloom in the hangar, killing one crew member and forcing the others to launch the Pasteur and escape - departing three weeks earlier than planned, and without adequate supplies.

Because of their forced launch, the Pasteur docks at Saint Helier, a medium-sized Floral asteroid of the Gladholders to pick up supplies. While there, they are surprised by the culture multiple times, but what shocks them most is that the asteroid's inhabitants have apparently discovered, through powerful telescopes, human life on both Earth and Venus, co-existing with the Mycora.

The "Pasteur" is pursued by ships of the Temples of Transcendent Evolution, a fringe political/religious group that believes the Mycora are divine, investing large sums of money in researching them.

Searching for ways to defend themselves against the Temple ships, the crew discover that the mission has a somewhat more violent purpose than they were led to believe. The "detectors" they have by this time dropped on Mars, Earth, and Luna can actually be repurposed as "cascade fusion" devices.

Shaken, the crew continues on their journey, but become aware that one of the crew is sabotaging the mission. The saboteur turns out to be the Mycorea specialist Baucum, with whom Strasheim has developed a personal relationship. She is secretly a member of the Temples of Transcendent Evolution, and after being discovered, Baucum ruptures a storage bag inside herself that had been carrying spores of Mycora. Terrified, the crew responds, with Strasheim himself shoving her out an airlock before the Mycora now consuming her can also devour the ship.

It is determined that the mission's actual purpose was to use the detector/bombs to establish small footholds on the three planetary bodies, but it occurs to Strasheim that if such a device were detonated in the Sun, a massive blast of laddered-down iron would wipe out most Mycoran life in the inner Solar System. Several of the Temples' ships that have chased them since Mars, are now desperately attempting to destroy the Pasteur against this possibility (The Pasteur is heading toward the Sun to get away from the Mycosystem via an out-of-plane slingshot, but the action could have been construed differently by Temples' agents.).

Having discovered this possibility, the crew decide not to pursue it, but instead transmit the existence of this potential weapon back to the outer Solar System. As a result of the energy of this high power transmission the Mycora break through the hull of the Pasteur, blooming, and unexpectedly assuming the form of a pseudo-human spokesperson. It transpires that the Mycora is sapient and without ill-will toward humans. Communication is brief but paradigm-shattering. The ambassador explains that the majority of persons consumed during the destruction of Earth or on the evacuation out-system was incorporated into the Mycosystem and are still alive in some sense, their consciousness and intelligence adjusted to run on the cellular-automata-like Mycora substrate, or "Unpacked". The crew is given information on how to mark areas as off-limits to the Mycosystem. They are told that humanity is, "...Utterly free. Free to conduct your lives in the classical manner, to escape this solar system, to populate the stars. Free to Unpack, if you choose".

The book ends almost thirteen years later, with a description of how the captain of the Pasteur has been diagnosed with a terminal disease and requests that Strasheim (now a successful media magnate) be his witness as he joins the Mycora.

== Characters ==
- John Strasheim – The main character. Works as a cobbler on Ganymede, but is also a very good amateur journalist. It is the latter skill which causes him to be selected for the journey to the Earth.
- Vaclav Lottick – Introduced as the most powerful man in the Solar System, he is the head of research for the Immunity and the man who invites Strasheim on the mission to Earth.
- Darren Wallich - Captain of the Louis Pasteur, has had a "tickle capacitor" implant, which makes his personality seem more likable.
- Tosca Lehne – Another crewmember. One of the inventors of the t-balance, which coats the outside of the Pasteur with the purpose of making it appear to be part of the Mycosystem.
- Jenna Davenroy – A nuclear engineer in her 40s. She is the ladderdown expert on the Pasteur and also its chief propulsion monitor.
- Tug Jinacio – A Response lieutenant, responsible for handling emergencies on the Pasteur (ex. fire, bloom, etc.). Killed in the hangar bloom.
- Renata Baucum – Bioanalyst on the Pasteur, who turns out to be a traitor. Killed when she ruptures the Mycora hidden within her and Strasheim blows her out of an airlock.
- Sudhir Rapisardi – Coordinated the design of the TGL (technogenic life) detectors that the Pasteur will place on the Earth to monitor the Mycora. Is the biophysicist on the Pasteur.
- Chris Dibrin – sent by the Governor to show the Pasteur crew around Saint Helier. He has an artificial intelligence implanted into his brain that enables him to think faster.

== The Louis Pasteur Spaceship ==
Named after Louis Pasteur the French microbiologist and chemist, the ship is described as being very small and having an unusual external covering invented by Lehne called the t-balance.

According to Strasheim, the Pasteur is "like a bathroom with seven shower stalls and a streetcar cockpit wedged incongruously at one end, a utility closet wedged in the other". Rather cramped quarters for a crew of seven going on a voyage that will take about two years.

The purpose of the t-balance is to convince the Mycora that the ship is part of it by means of tactile camouflage. It is described as a gleaming rainbow gray colored coating that appeared to be made up of millions of minuscule dots, each of which also appears to be made up of millions of tiny dots, and so on. The t-balance also gives off the illusion that the dots are moving. Unfortunately for the Pasteur's crew, although the t-balance should work in theory, it has not yet been tested because the only way to do so is by surrounding it with Mycora.

== Places ==
- Ganymede: Where the story begins. It is one of Jupiter's moons and home to people who are protected from the Mycora by the Immunity.
- Ansharton: A large city on Ganymede where Lottick's office is.
- Philusburg: A smaller city on Ganymede where Strasheim and his mother live.
- Galileo: The city/base/port where the Pasteur is docked on Ganymede.
- Saint Helier: A Floral asteroid where the Pasteur docks to stock up on supplies.

== Terms/Organizations ==
- Immunity: A defensive system used by the people on Ganymede (as well as those on the other outer planets) to keep spores of Mycora from invading. Also a term used by people under its protection to refer to themselves.
- Ladderdown: System of converting elements into other elements further down the Periodic Table. As a result of using this system, the inhabitants of the Immunity have a plethora of high-numbered elements lying around. For example, they have so much gold they use it to weigh down their shoes and pave the streets.
- Mycora: A substance that appears to be grey goo, but is in actuality a type of technogenic life form created by humans that escaped their control and began consuming everything around it. It has also evolved from its original state and adapted to an environment where there is nothing left to consume. Throughout the book, Conway's Game of Life is used as an imperfect example of how the Mycora operates.
- Temples of Transcendent Evolution: Originally formed on Callisto, it is an organization that invests large sums of money into research about the Mycora. They are spiritually inclined and believe that the Mycora is "a presence greater than themselves".
