= Synthesis of precious metals =

Production of rare lustrous high-conductivity elements

The synthesis of precious metals involves the use of either nuclear reactors or particle accelerators to produce these elements.

== Precious metals occurring as fission products ==
Ruthenium and rhodium are precious metals produced as a small percentage of the fission products from the nuclear fission of uranium. The longest half-lives of the radioisotopes of these elements generated by nuclear fission are 373.59 days for ruthenium and 45 days for rhodium. This makes the extraction of the non-radioactive isotope from spent nuclear fuel possible after a few years of storage, although the extract must be checked for radioactivity from trace quantities of other elements before use.

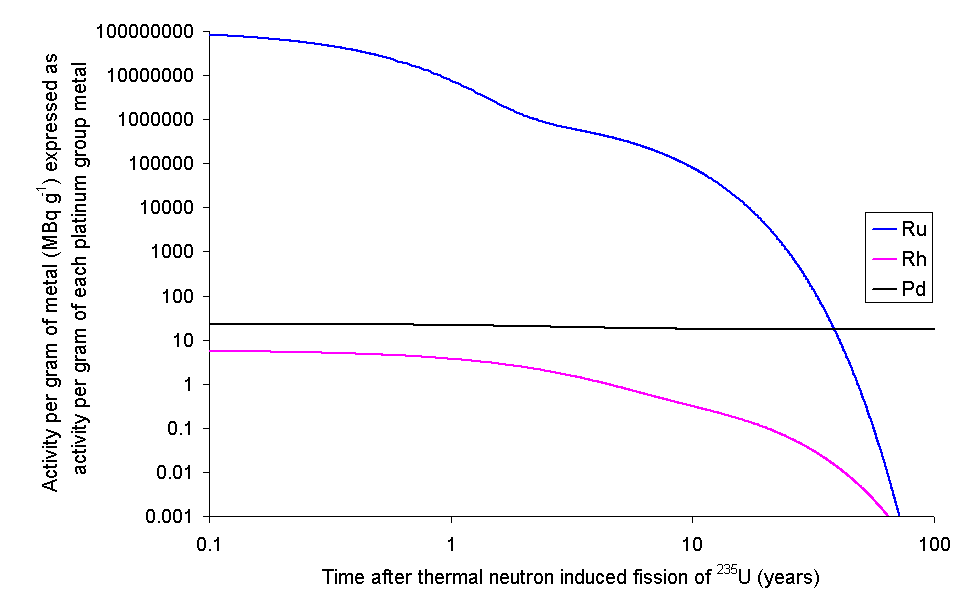
The radioactivity in MBq per gram of each of the platinum group metals which are formed by the fission of uranium. Of the metals shown, ruthenium is the most radioactive. Palladium has an almost constant activity, due to the very long half-life of the synthesized ^{107}Pd, while rhodium is the least radioactive.

=== Ruthenium ===
Each kilogram of the fission products of ^{235}U will contain 63.44 grams of ruthenium isotopes with halflives longer than a day. Since a typical used nuclear fuel contains about 3% fission products, one ton of used fuel will contain about 1.9 kg of ruthenium. The ^{103}Ru and ^{106}Ru will render the fission ruthenium very radioactive. If the fission occurs in an instant then the ruthenium thus formed will have an activity due to ^{103}Ru of 109 TBq g^{−1} and ^{106}Ru of 1.52 TBq g^{−1}. ^{103}Ru has a half-life of about 39 days meaning that within 390 days it will have effectively decayed to the only stable isotope of rhodium, ^{103}Rh, well before any reprocessing is likely to occur. ^{106}Ru has a half-life of about 373 days, meaning that if the fuel is left to cool for 5 years before reprocessing only about 3% of the original quantity will remain; the rest will have decayed. For comparison, the activity in natural potassium (due to naturally occurring ^{40}K) is about 30 Bq per gram.

=== Rhodium ===
It is possible to extract rhodium from used nuclear fuel: 1 kg of fission products of ^{235}U contains 13.3 grams of ^{103}Rh. At 3% fission products by weight, one ton of used fuel will contain about 400 grams of rhodium. The longest lived radioisotope of rhodium is ^{102m}Rh with a half-life of 2.9 years, while the ground state (^{102}Rh) has a half-life of 207 days.

Each kilogram of fission rhodium will contain 6.62 ng of ^{102}Rh and 3.68 ng of ^{102m}Rh. As ^{102}Rh decays by beta decay to either ^{102}Ru (80%) (some positron emission will occur) or ^{102}Pd (20%) (some gamma ray photons with about 500 keV are generated) and the excited state decays by beta decay (electron capture) to ^{102}Ru (some gamma ray photons with about 1 MeV are generated). If the fission occurs in an instant then 13.3 grams of rhodium will contain 67.1 MBq (1.81 mCi) of ^{102}Rh and 10.8 MBq (291 μCi) of ^{102m}Rh. As it is normal to allow used nuclear fuel to stand for about five years before reprocessing, much of this activity will decay away leaving 4.7 MBq of ^{102}Rh and 5.0 MBq of ^{102m}Rh. If the rhodium metal was then left for 20 years after fission, the 13.3 grams of rhodium metal would contain 1.3 kBq of ^{102}Rh and 500 kBq of ^{102m}Rh. Rhodium has the highest price of these precious metals ($440,000/kg in 2022), but the cost of the separation of the rhodium from the other metals needs to be considered, although recent high prices may create opportunity for consideration.

== Precious metals produced via irradiation ==
=== Gold ===
Chrysopoeia, the artificial production of gold, is the traditional goal of alchemy. Such transmutation is possible in particle accelerators or nuclear reactors, although the production cost is estimated to be a trillion times the market price of gold. Since there is only one stable gold isotope, ^{197}Au, nuclear reactions must create this isotope in order to produce usable gold.

In 1941, Rubby Sherr, Kenneth Bainbridge and Herbert H. Anderson synthesized gold from mercury with neutron bombardment using the cyclotron at Harvard University, but the isotopes of gold produced were all radioactive. In 1924, a German scientist, Adolf Miethe, reported achieving the same feat, but after various replication attempts around the world, it was deemed an experimental error.

In 1980, Glenn Seaborg, K. Aleklett, and the Bevatron team transmuted several thousand atoms of bismuth into gold at the Lawrence Berkeley National Laboratory. His experimental technique using carbon-12 and neon-20 nuclei was able to remove protons and neutrons from the bismuth atoms. Seaborg's technique was far too expensive to enable the routine manufacture of gold but his work was then the closest yet to emulating an aspect of the mythical Philosopher's stone.

In 2002 and 2004, CERN scientists at the Super Proton Synchrotron reported producing a minuscule amount of gold nuclei from induced photon emissions within deliberate near-miss collisions of lead nuclei. In 2022, CERN's ISOLDE team reported producing 18 gold nuclei from proton bombardment of a uranium target. In 2025, CERN's ALICE experiment team announced that over the previous decade, they had used the Large Hadron Collider to replicate the 2002 SPS mechanisms at higher energies. A total of roughly 260 billion gold nuclei were created over three experimental runs, a minuscule amount of about 90 picograms.

Startup Marathon Fusion proposes a theoretical way to make gold from mercury: use a nuclear fusion reactor to bombard mercury with high-energy neutrons, specifically ^{198}Hg, an isotope with 10% abundance. This creates the unstable ^{197}Hg, which then decays into stable gold (^{197}Au) with a half-life of approximately 64 hours.

== See also ==
- Nuclear transmutation
