= Kenneth Bainbridge =

American physicist (1904–1996)

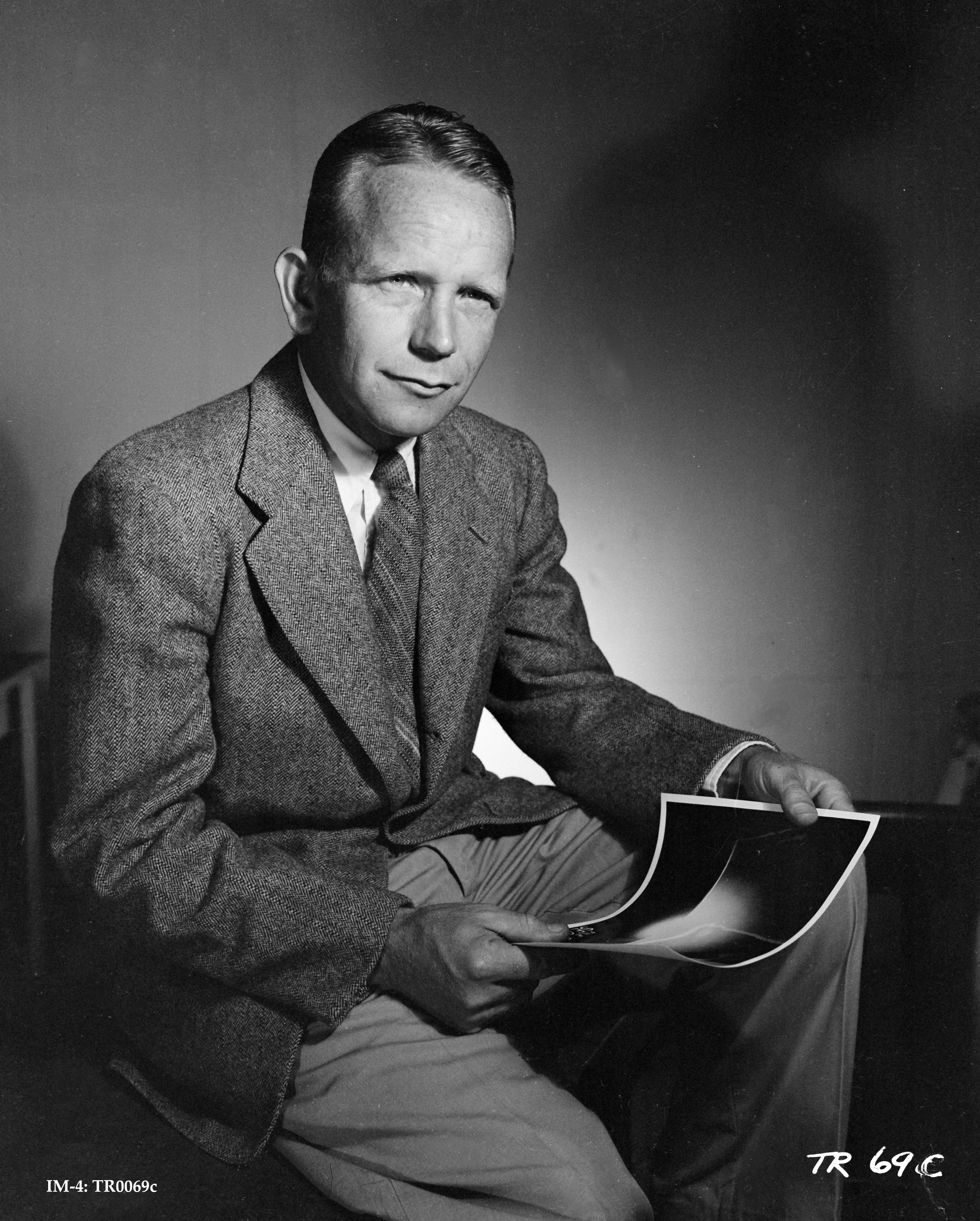
- Born: Kenneth Tompkins Bainbridge; July 27, 1904; Cooperstown, New York, U.S.
- Died: July 14, 1996 (aged 91); Lexington, Massachusetts, U.S.
- Education: Massachusetts Institute of Technology (BS, MS); Princeton University (PhD)
- Known for: Nuclear mass measurements; Director of the Trinity nuclear test
- Scientific career
- Fields: Physics
- Workplaces: Harvard University
- Doctoral advisor: Henry DeWolf Smyth
- Doctoral students: Edward Mills Purcell

Kenneth Tompkins Bainbridge (July 27, 1904 – July 14, 1996) was an American physicist at Harvard University who worked on cyclotron research. His accurate measurements of mass differences between nuclear isotopes allowed him to confirm Albert Einstein's mass–energy equivalence concept. He was the Director of the Manhattan Project's Trinity nuclear test, which took place July 16, 1945. Bainbridge described the Trinity explosion as a "foul and awesome display". He remarked to J. Robert Oppenheimer immediately after the test, "Now we are all sons of bitches." This marked the beginning of his dedication to ending the testing of nuclear weapons and to efforts to maintain civilian control of future developments in that field.

== Early life ==
Kenneth Tompkins Bainbridge was born in Cooperstown, New York, on July 27, 1904. He had one older brother and one younger brother. He was educated at Horace Mann School in New York. While at high school he developed an interest in ham radio which inspired him to enter Massachusetts Institute of Technology (MIT) in 1921 to study electrical engineering. In five years he earned both Bachelor of Science (S.B.) and Master of Science (S.M.) degrees. During the summer breaks he worked at General Electric's laboratories in Lynn, Massachusetts and Schenectady, New York. While there he obtained three patents related to photoelectric tubes.

Bainbridge's work at General Electric made him aware of how interested he was in physics. Upon graduating from MIT in 1926, he enrolled at Princeton University, where Karl T. Compton, a consultant to General Electric, was on the faculty. While at Princeton, Bainbridge created his first mass spectrograph, came up with methods for identifying elements, and started studying nuclei. In 1929, he was awarded a Ph.D. in his new field, writing his thesis on "A search for element 87 by analysis of positive rays" under the supervision of Henry DeWolf Smyth.

== Early career ==
Bainbridge enjoyed a series of prestigious fellowships after graduation. He was awarded a National Research Council, and then a Bartol Research Foundation fellowship. At the time the Franklin Institute's Bartol Research Foundation was located on the Swarthmore College campus in Pennsylvania, and was directed by W. F. G. Swann, an English physicist with an interest in nuclear physics. Bainbridge spent four years (1929-1933) at the Franklin Institute’s Bartol laboratories and during his time there Bainbridge learned how to take subtle and difficult mass measurements. Bainbridge married Margaret ("Peg") Pitkin, a member of the Swarthmore teaching faculty, in September 1931. They had a son, Martin Keeler, and two daughters, Joan and Margaret Tomkins.

In 1932, Bainbridge developed a mass spectrometer with a resolving power of 600 and a relative precision of one part in 10,000. He used this instrument to verify Albert Einstein's mass–energy equivalence, E = mc^{2}. Since Bainbridge was the first to successfully test Einstein’s theory of the equivalence of mass and energy, he was awarded the Louis Edward Levy Medal. Francis William Aston wrote that:

By establishing accurate comparisons of the masses of the light particles concerned in nuclear disintegrations, particularly that of ^{7}Li, discovered by Cockcroft and Walton, he achieved a noteworthy triumph in the experimental proof of the fundamental theory of Einstein of the equivalence of mass and energy.

In 1933, Bainbridge was awarded a prestigious Guggenheim Fellowship, which he used to travel to England and work at Ernest Rutherford's Cavendish Laboratory at Cambridge University. While there he continued his work developing the mass spectrograph, and became friends with the British physicist John Cockcroft. Also, during Bainbridge’s time in Cambridge, he produced very advanced mass spectrographs and ended up becoming a leading expert in the field of mass spectroscopy. It was at Cambridge when Bainbridge first began to work with nuclear chain reactions.

When his Guggenheim fellowship expired in September 1934, he returned to the United States, where he accepted an associate professorship at Harvard University. He started by building a new mass spectrograph that he had designed at the Cavendish Laboratory. Working with J. Curry Street, he commenced work on a cyclotron. They had a design for a 37-inch (940 mm) cyclotron provided by Ernest Lawrence, but decided to build a 42-inch (1,100 mm) cyclotron instead.

One of the cyclotron's most notable experiments was in nuclear transmutation, specifically the synthesis of precious metals including gold, which Bainbridge and his collaborators Rubby Sherr and Herbert H. Anderson announced in 1941.

Bainbridge was elected a Fellow of the American Academy of Arts and Sciences in 1937. His interest in mass spectroscopy led naturally to an interest in the relative abundance of isotopes. The discovery of nuclear fission in uranium-235 led to an interest in separating this isotope. He proposed using a Holweck pump to produce the vacuum necessary for this work, and enlisted George B. Kistiakowsky and E. Bright Wilson to help. There was little interest in their work because research was being carried out elsewhere. Bainbridge ended up bringing his Holweck pump to government authorities in Washington D.C., however the government authorities claimed that scientists working for the government were already working on a process of isotope separation and that he should discontinue his work using the Holweck pump for isotope separation. In 1943, their cyclotron was requisitioned by Edwin McMillan for use by the U. S. Army. It was packed up and carted off to Los Alamos, New Mexico.

== World War II ==
=== MIT Radiation Laboratory ===
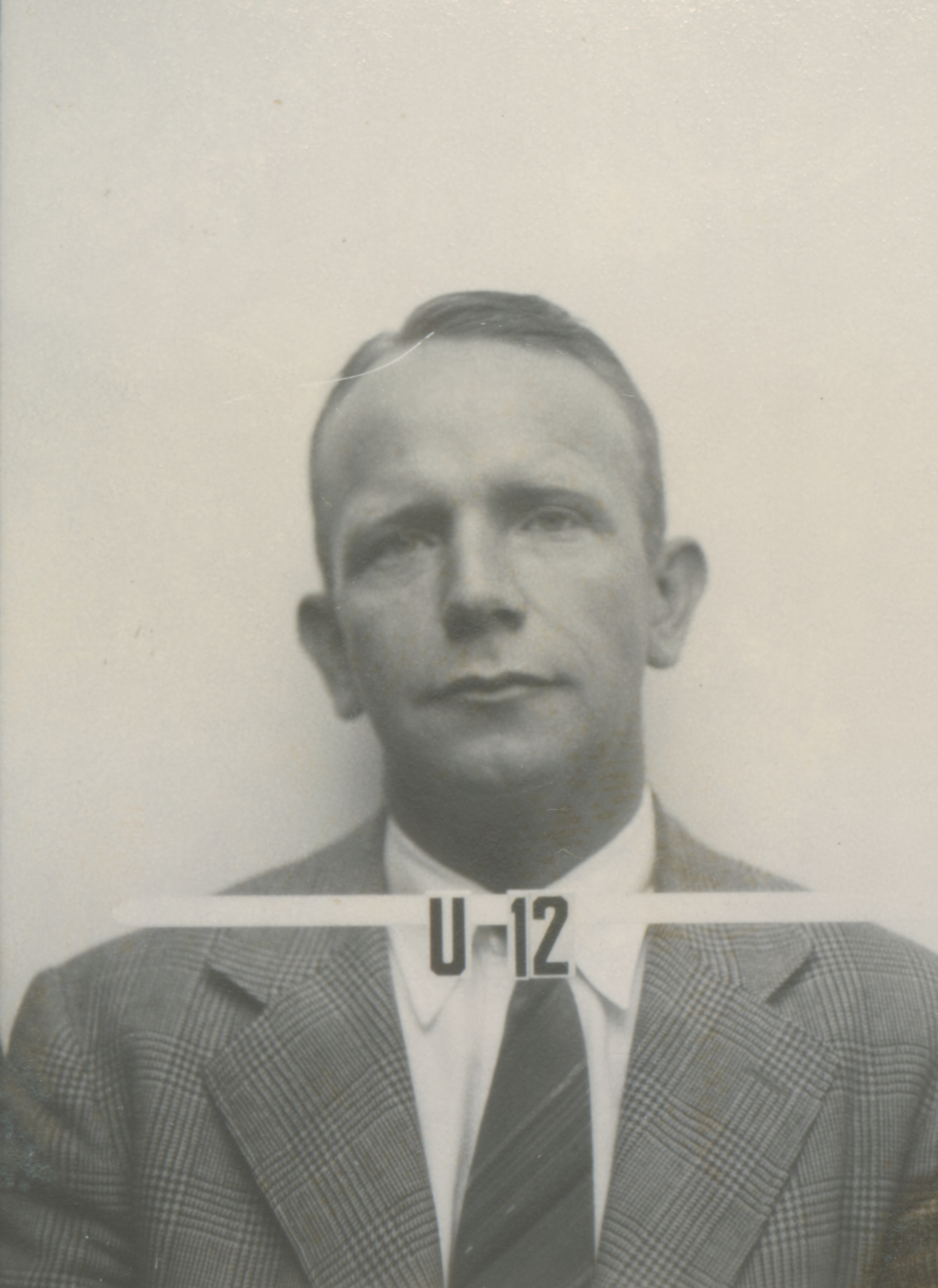
Bainbridge's Los Alamos badge

In September 1940, with World War II raging in Europe, the British Tizard Mission brought a number of new technologies to the United States, including a cavity magnetron, a high-powered device that generates microwaves using the interaction of a stream of electrons with a magnetic field. This device, which promised to revolutionize radar, demolished any thoughts the Americans had entertained about their technological leadership. Alfred Lee Loomis of the National Defense Research Committee established the Radiation Laboratory at the Massachusetts Institute of Technology (MIT) to develop this radar technology. In October, Bainbridge became one of the first scientists to be recruited for the Radiation Laboratory by Ernest Lawrence.

Bainbridge spent two and a half years at MIT’s Radiation laboratory working on radar development. The scientists divided up the work between them; Bainbridge drew pulse modulators. Working with the Navy, he helped develop high-powered radars for warships. Then, from March 1941 to May 1941, Bainbridge was sent to England to discuss radar development with the English. While he was in England, he was able to see firsthand the various radar equipment that the British had installed being used in combat. Bainbridge also met with British scientists and learned about the British’s efforts in developing an atomic bomb. When Bainbridge returned to the United States, he reported about the British's plans to build an atomic bomb. Bainbridge then continued to work on the development of radar technology at MIT.

Bainbridge eventually became the lead of a division of the lab that was responsible for ship-borne interception control radar, ground systems search and warning class radar, ground-based fire control radar, microwave early warning radar, search and fighter control radar, and fire control radar. Many of these radar technologies would find their way onto aircraft carriers fighting the Japanese in the Pacific as the war went on.

=== Manhattan Project ===
Video of the Trinity nuclear test

In May 1943, Bainbridge joined Robert Oppenheimer's Project Y at Los Alamos. He initially led E-2, the instrumentation group, which developed X-ray instrumentation for examining explosions. In March 1944, he became head of a new group, E-9, which was charged with conducting the first nuclear test. In Oppenheimer's sweeping reorganization of the Los Alamos laboratory in August 1944, the E-9 Group became X-2. He also worked on developing designs for the uranium Little Boy design dropped on Hiroshima and the plutonium Fat Man design used on Nagasaki. Additionally, Bainbridge also helped in the development of methods to determine the trajectories of the atomic bombs.

In March 1945, Bainbridge was given the position of director of the Trinity Test. Bainbridge was tasked with finding a site that was flat in order to be able to take accurate measurements of the explosion. The site also had to be unnoticeable for security reasons, but decently close to Los Alamos. Bainbridge ended up finding a site that was approximately 200 miles away from Los Alamos, located in the Alamogordo Gunnery Range. Bainbridge along with his assistant director, John Williams who was also a physicist planned and oversaw the construction of the needed facilities at the test site. The facilities consisted of observation bunkers, hundreds of miles of wiring, miles of paved roads, as well as housing. Additionally, Bainbridge played a role in the development of bomb detonator equipment and setting up equipment for measuring the yield of the explosion. On July 16, 1945, Bainbridge and his colleagues conducted the Trinity nuclear test. To his relief, the explosion of the first atomic bomb went off without such drama, in what he later described as "a foul and awesome display". He turned to Oppenheimer and said, "Now we are all sons of bitches." After the conclusion of the Trinity test Bainbridge co-wrote the official account of the Trinity test that was given to the United States government.

Bainbridge was relieved that the Trinity test had been a success, relating in a 1975 Bulletin of the Atomic Scientists article, "I had a feeling of exhilaration that the 'gadget' had gone off properly followed by one of deep relief. I wouldn't have to go to the tower to see what had gone wrong."

For his work on the Manhattan Project, Bainbridge received two letters of commendation from the project's director, Major General Leslie R. Groves, Jr. He also received a Presidential Certificate of Merit for his work at the MIT Radiation Laboratory.

== Postwar ==
Bainbridge returned to Harvard after the war, and initiated the construction of a 96-inch (2,400 mm) synchro-cyclotron, which has since been dismantled. Also, upon arriving back at Harvard, Bainbridge created a larger mass spectrograph. Utilizing his new device, Bainbridge was able to establish the existence of the neutrino, which is a basic component of matter that had eluded scientists for some time. From 1950 to 1954, he chaired the physics department at Harvard. During those years, he drew the ire of Senator Joseph McCarthy for his aggressive defense of his colleagues in academia. As chairman, he was responsible for the renovation of the old Jefferson Physical Laboratory, and he established the Morris Loeb Lectures in Physics. He also devoted a good deal of his time to improving the laboratory facilities for graduate students. During Bainbridge’s remaining years at Harvard, he continued to work towards finding new mechanisms to obtain precise yields of atomic masses.

Throughout the 1950s, Bainbridge remained an outspoken proponent of civilian control of nuclear power and the abandonment of nuclear testing. In 1950 he was one of twelve prominent scientists who petitioned President Harry S. Truman to declare that the United States would never be the first to use the hydrogen bomb. Bainbridge retired from Harvard in 1975.

Bainbridge's wife Margaret died suddenly in January 1967 from a blood clot in a broken wrist. He married Helen Brinkley King, an editor at William Morrow in New York City, in October 1969. She died in February 1989. A scholarship was established at Sarah Lawrence College in her memory. He died at his home in Lexington, Massachusetts, on July 14, 1996. He was survived by his daughters from his first marriage, Joan Bainbridge Safford and Margaret Bainbridge Robinson. He was buried in the Abel's Hill Cemetery on Martha's Vineyard, in a plot with his first wife Margaret and his son Martin. His papers are in the Harvard University Archives.

== In popular culture ==
In the 2023 film Oppenheimer, he is portrayed by Josh Peck.

== See also ==
- Bainbridge mass spectrometer
