= Herbert Anderson =

Herbert Anderson may refer to:

- Herbert Anderson (actor) (1917–1994), American actor
- Herbert H. Anderson (1913–2001), American organic chemist
- Herbert L. Anderson (1914–1988), American physicist

== See also ==
- Herbert (given name)
- Anderson (surname)
