= Smyth Report =

First official account of the Manhattan Project

Atomic Energy for Military Purposes
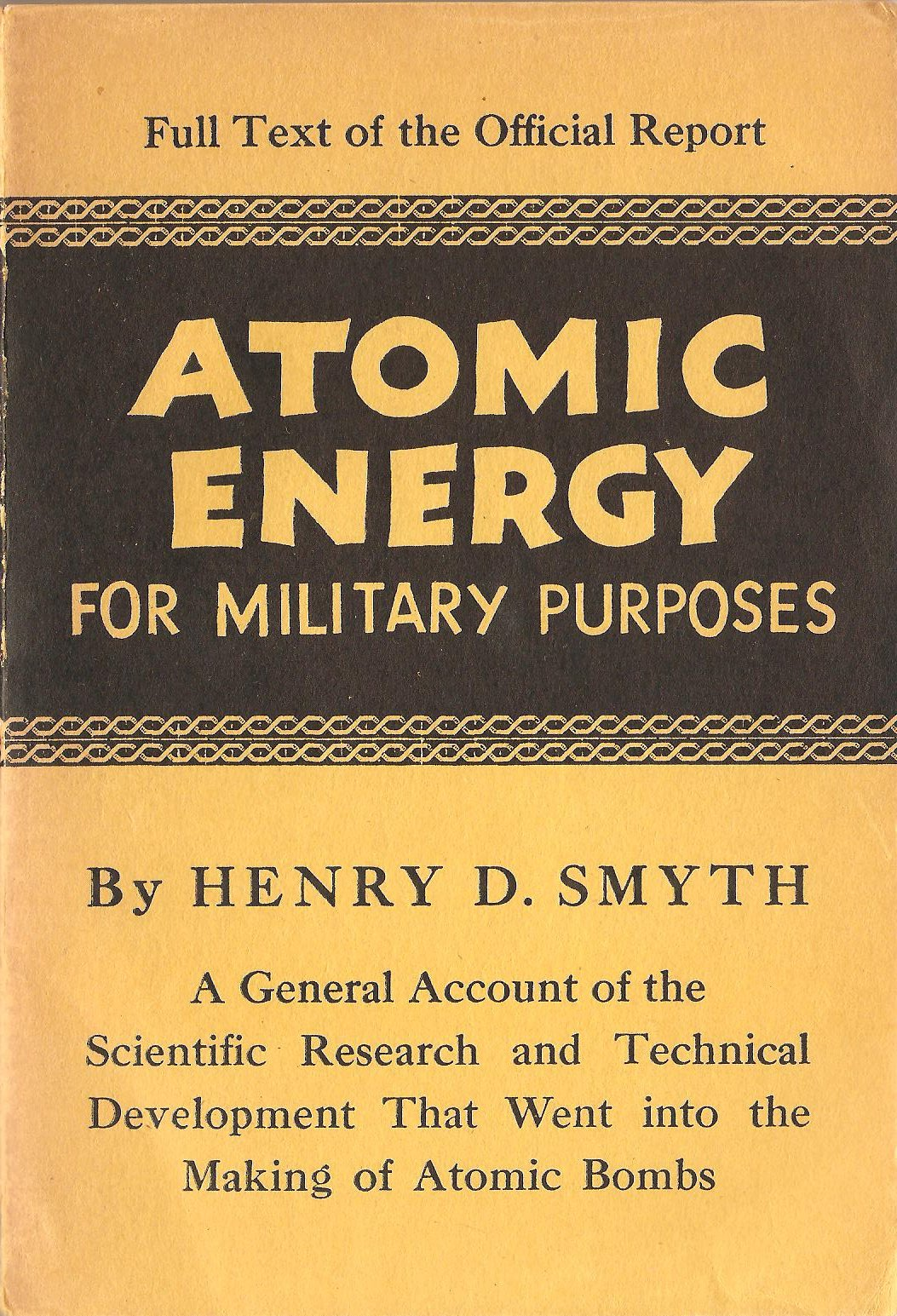
- Cover of 1945 Princeton edition
- Author: Henry DeWolf Smyth
- Language: English
- Publisher: Princeton University Press
- Publication date: 1945
- Publication place: United States
- Pages: 264
- OCLC: 770285
- LC Class: 595388938
- Text: Atomic Energy for Military Purposes at Internet Archive

The Smyth Report (officially Atomic Energy for Military Purposes) is the common name of an administrative history written by the American physicist Henry DeWolf Smyth about the Manhattan Project, the Allied effort to develop atomic bombs during World War II. The subtitle of the report is A General Account of the Development of Methods of Using Atomic Energy for Military Purposes. It was released to the media on August 11, 1945, and the public on August 12, 1945, just days after the atomic bombings of Hiroshima and Nagasaki on August 6 and 9.

Smyth was commissioned to write the report by Major General Leslie R. Groves, Jr., the director of the Manhattan Project. The Smyth Report was the first official account of the development of the atomic bombs and the basic physical processes behind them. It also served as an indication as to what information was declassified; anything in the Smyth Report could be discussed openly. For this reason, the Smyth Report focused heavily on information, such as basic nuclear physics, which was either already widely known in the scientific community or easily deducible by a competent scientist, and omitted details about chemistry, metallurgy, and ordnance. According to historian Rebecca Press Schwartz, this would ultimately give a false impression that the Manhattan Project was all about physics.

The Smyth Report sold almost 127,000 copies in its first eight printings, and was on The New York Times best-seller list from mid-October 1945 until late January 1946. It has been translated into over 40 languages.

== Background ==
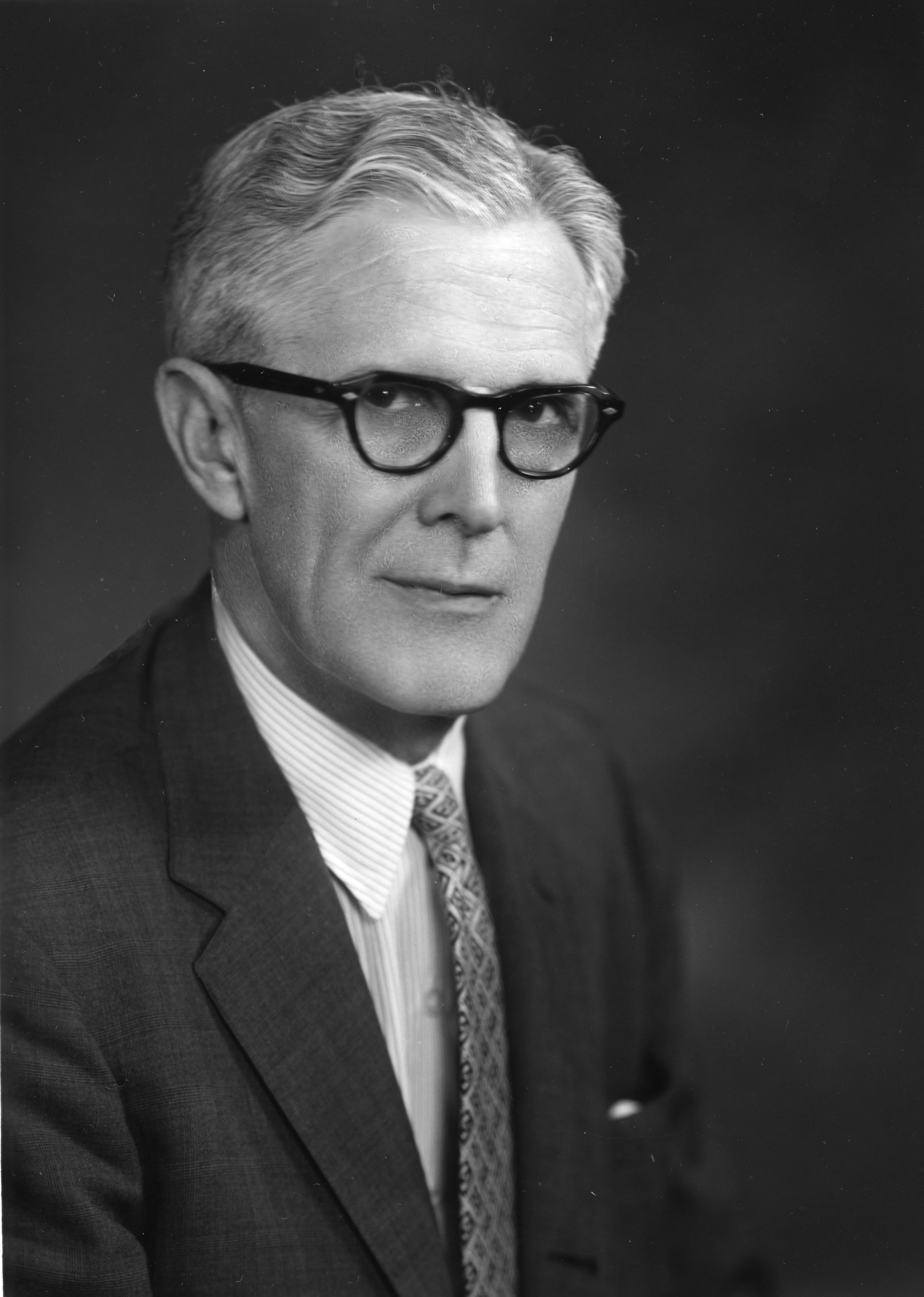
Portrait of Henry "Harry" Smyth, 1960s

Henry DeWolf Smyth was a professor of physics and chairman of the physics department of Princeton University from 1935 to 1949. During World War II, he was involved in the Manhattan Project from early 1941, initially as a member of the National Defense Research Committee's Committee on Uranium, and later as an associate director of the Metallurgical Laboratory in Chicago. In late 1943, the President of Princeton University, Harold W. Dodds, began insisting that Smyth work part-time at Princeton, where there was a shortage of physicists because so many of them were engaged in war work. Princeton had commitments to teach army and navy personnel, and he needed physicists like Smyth to meet those commitments. Smyth therefore became a consultant at Chicago, where he was in charge of designing a nuclear reactor that used heavy water as a neutron moderator, and commuted from Princeton, working in Chicago on alternate weeks.

In early 1944, Smyth raised the possibility of producing an unclassified report for the general public on the achievements of the Manhattan Project. The director of the Metallurgical Laboratory, Arthur Compton, supported the idea. He arranged a meeting with James B. Conant, the President of Harvard University and one of the senior administrators of the Manhattan Project, who had similar thoughts. Conant took up the matter with the Manhattan Project's director, Major General Leslie R. Groves, Jr. In April, Smyth received a formal letter from Groves asking him to write such a report. Both the report and the choice of Smyth as its author were approved by the Manhattan Project's governing body, the Military Policy Committee, in May 1944.

The Report was to serve two functions. First, it was to be the public and official U.S. government account of the development of the atomic bombs, outlining the development of the then-secret laboratories and production sites at Los Alamos, New Mexico, Oak Ridge, Tennessee, and Hanford, Washington, and the basic physical processes responsible for the functioning of nuclear weapons, in particular nuclear fission and the nuclear chain reaction. Second, it served as a reference for other scientists as to what information was declassified—anything said in the Smyth Report could be said freely in open literature. For this reason, the Smyth Report focused heavily on information already available in declassified literature, such as much of the basic nuclear physics used in weapons, which was either already widely known in the scientific community or could have been easily deduced by a competent scientist.

Smyth stated the purpose of the Smyth Report in the Preface:

The ultimate responsibility for our nation's policy rests on its citizens and they can discharge such responsibilities wisely only if they are informed. The average citizen cannot be expected to understand clearly how an atomic bomb is constructed or how it works but there is in this country a substantial group of engineers and scientists who can understand such things and who can explain the potentialities of atomic bombs to their fellow citizens. The present report is written for this professional group and is a matter-of-fact, general account of work in the USA since 1939 aimed at the production of such bombs. It is neither a documented official history nor a technical treatise for experts. Secrecy requirements have affected both the detailed content and general emphasis so that many interesting developments have been omitted.

This contrasted somewhat with what Groves wrote in the foreword:

All pertinent scientific information which can be released to the public at this time without violating the needs of national security is contained in this volume. No requests for additional information should be made to private people or organizations associated directly or indirectly with the project. People disclosing or securing additional information by any means whatsoever without authorization are subject to severe penalties under the Espionage Act.

== Writing ==
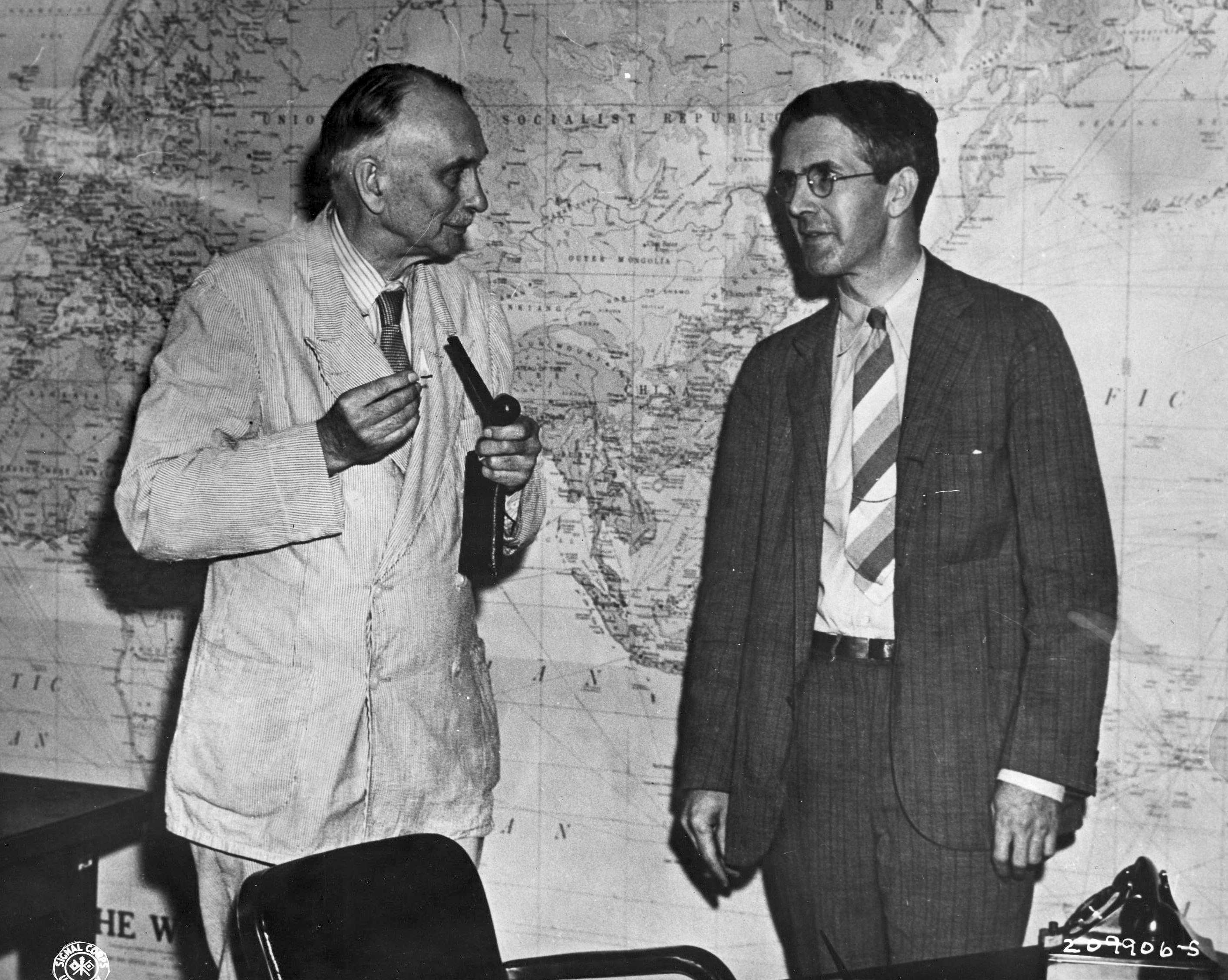
Richard Tolman (left) and Henry D. Smyth (right)

Smyth possessed security clearances necessary to visit project sites, access documents and to discuss the work with the research personnel. Groves approved Smyth's request to hire another Princeton physicist, Lincoln G. Smith, as a research assistant. A letter to the Manhattan Project's senior managers, Kenneth Nichols, J. Robert Oppenheimer, Ernest Lawrence, Harold Urey, and Franklin Matthias, explained:

The purpose is to give clearly and promptly recognition to those who have worked so long and necessarily so anonymously ... To accomplish his purpose, Dr. Smyth must have rather complete information concerning your phase of the project including access to necessary documents ... [and] information and advice from you and your principal assistants.

Since Smyth still had his commitments at Princeton and Chicago, he could only work on the report part-time. He wrote the report in his office in Princeton's Palmer Laboratory. Bars were installed on the windows of Smyth's office and the one adjacent to it. The hallway door to his office was locked and blocked by a large safe so that the only access was through the adjacent office, where there was an armed guard. The guards worked in eight-hour shifts, and one was present around the clock. When Smyth sent papers to Groves in Washington, D.C., they went by military courier.

Smyth sent an outline and rough draft of the report to Groves for approval in August 1944, followed in February 1945 by drafts of the first twelve chapters, leaving only the final chapter to be completed. Groves and Conant reviewed the drafts, and made several criticisms. They felt that it was too technical for general readers, did not mention the names of enough participants, and dwelt too much on the activities at the Los Alamos Laboratory. Groves was particularly anxious that deserving people be mentioned, as he felt that this would lessen the danger of security breaches. After Smyth made a series of changes in response to this, Groves sent the manuscript to his scientific adviser, Richard Tolman. Tolman was assisted by two physicists who were working in his office at the National Defense Research Committee as technical aides, Paul C. Fine from the University of Texas, and William Shurcliff from Harvard University. They had the dual task of editing and censoring the manuscript.

Smyth and Tolman accepted a set of criteria, agreeing that information could be released under the conditions:

I. (A) That it is important to a reasonable understanding of what had been done on the project as a whole or (B) That it is of true scientific interest and likely to be truly helpful to scientific workers in this country and

II. (A) That it is already generally known by competent scientists or (B) that it can be deduced or guessed by competent scientists from what is already known, combined with the knowledge that the project was in the overall successful or

III. (A) That it has no real bearing on the production of atomic bombs or (B) That it could be discovered by a small group (15 of whom not over 5 would be senior men) of competent scientists working in a well-equipped college lab in a year's time or less.

Writing to Oppenheimer in April 1945, Smyth noted that

All discussion of ordnance work is also to be removed. There is no objection to including the general statement of the ordnance problem and all the other parts of the problem, but the approaches to solution that have been made will be omitted. On the other hand, the feeling is that there is no objection to including the nuclear physics. The General believes that the metallurgical work and a considerable amount of the chemistry work should be excluded on the ground that it would be extremely difficult for the average scientist to carry out any of this work without supplies and material which would not be available to him. I am not entirely clear how this criterion should be applied, but it probably means the elimination of the metallurgical work on plutonium and at least of some of the chemistry.

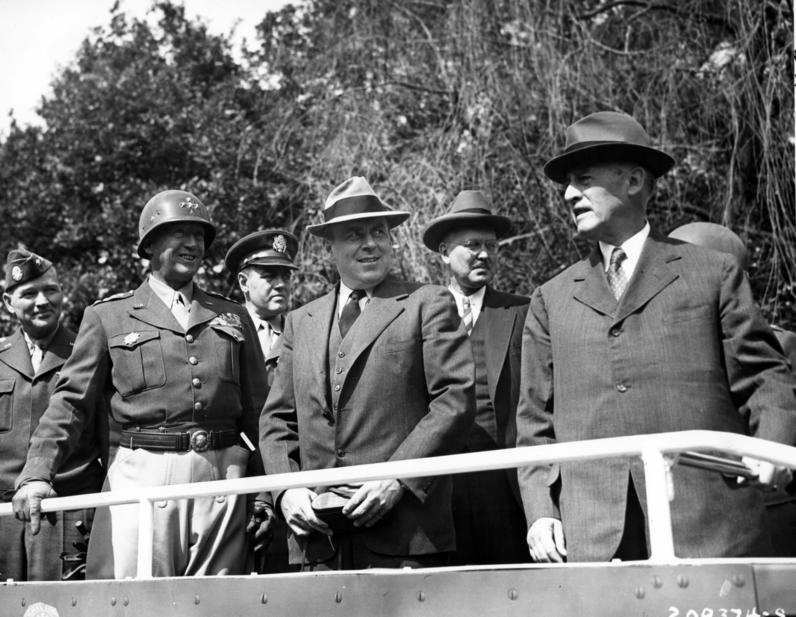
Secretary of War Henry L. Stimson (right) and his advisors review the 2nd Armored Division in Germany in July 1945. Left to right: Major General Floyd L. Parks, General George S. Patton, Jr., Colonel William H. Kyle, John J. McCloy, Harvey H. Bundy

Tolman and his assistants finished making their changes in July 1945, and Groves had copies sent out by courier to selected personnel. Each submitted a written report, which was returned with the courier and the manuscript. These were busy people who sometimes only had a few days or even hours to look at the manuscript. Many, but not all, merely signed a statement saying that they were happy with it. Nichols, the commander of the Manhattan District, sent back a detailed review. He had concerns about the amount of credit being given to different people and organizations, and recommended that "full credit be given to H. D. Smyth for preparing it and that the statement be made that the Army has no responsibility for the report except for asking him to do it". Smyth was given credit, but no such statement was issued. To prepare the final draft for the printer, Groves brought typists with the required security clearances to Washington, D.C., from the Manhattan District's headquarters in Oak Ridge.

Because the Manhattan Project was an Allied endeavor, Groves had to obtain permission from the British and American governments to publish the Smyth Report. A meeting was held on August 2, 1945, in the office of the Secretary of War, Henry Stimson. Accompanying Stimson were his two assistants, Harvey Bundy and George L. Harrison, and his military aide, Colonel William H. Kyle. Groves, Conant, and Tolman represented the Manhattan Project. James Chadwick, the head of the British scientific mission to the Manhattan Project, and Roger Makins from the British Embassy represented Britain. The meeting went on for two hours, as Groves and Conant sought to reassure Stimson that the report would not give vital secrets away to the Soviet Union.

For his part, Chadwick, who had not yet read the manuscript, could not fathom why the Americans wanted to publish such a document. When he did read it, he became quite alarmed. His concerns were addressed in a meeting with Groves and Conant, and he accepted their point of view. "I am now convinced", he wrote, "that the very special circumstances arising from the nature of the project, and of its organization, demand special treatment, and a report of this kind may well be necessary to maintain security of the really essential facts of the project."

== Publication ==
A thousand copies of the report were printed by lithography at the Pentagon, and deposited in Groves's office in the New War Department Building in Washington, D.C., where they were kept securely locked away. Final approval was sought from the President, Harry S. Truman, in a meeting at the White House on August 9, 1945, three days after the bombing of Hiroshima. Stimson, Harrison, Groves, Conant, Vannevar Bush, and Fleet Admiral William D. Leahy presented their views, and Truman authorized the immediate release of the report. The War Department released the thousand copies of the report that had been kept in Groves's office to the media for use by the radio broadcasters with an embargo time of 9:00 pm on August 11, 1945, and for the newspapers of August 12.

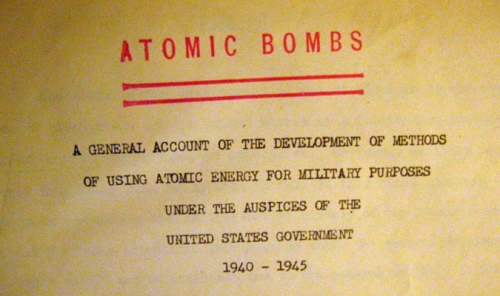
The original cover of the lithograph edition of the Smyth Report, with the red title stamp. This is the copy in the Rare Books and Special Collections Division of the Library of Congress.

The original title of the report, before it was published in book form, was Nuclear Bombs: A General Account of the Development of Methods of Using Nuclear Energy for Military Purposes Under the Auspices of the United States Government, 1940–1945. The word "nuclear" was changed to "atomic" because while the former was favored by physicists, it was not in common use by the general public at that time. This was the title used on the copyright certificate. The book was copyrighted to Smyth but issued with the statement that "reproduction in whole or in part is authorized and permitted". Groves had the report copyrighted by Smyth in order to prevent someone else from copyrighting it.

Groves was concerned about the security implications of the title, so instead of having "Atomic Bombs" on the cover, it was left blank, and a rubber stamp was made. The intention was for this to be used on each copy before it was distributed. This was done for the copyright deposit copies, but not those given to the press or the public. The lumbering subtitle therefore became the title. A side effect of this was that it became generally known as the "Smyth Report". Over the years, the term "nuclear" gradually gained traction, and by 1960 it had become more common than "atomic".

In mid-1945, Smyth approached Datus C. Smith, the director of Princeton University Press, about the possibility of renting his printing plant to the government during a two-week summer shutdown so that Smyth could produce 5,000 copies of a top secret report. Smith's response was that he found it hard to imagine anyone needing to print 5,000 copies of a top secret report. He found it much easier to imagine delays due to unexpected printing problems, and his workers returning from summer vacation to find themselves locked out of a plant filled with top secret material. Under the circumstances, he felt that he could not risk this.

After the Smyth Report was officially released, Smith immediately offered to publish it. Smyth patiently explained that anyone was free to publish it, but Princeton University Press was only willing to do so on the understanding that this would be "Smyth's edition". Meanwhile, Smyth approached McGraw-Hill about publishing it. The editors at McGraw-Hill found the manuscript dull and somewhat technical for a general audience and suggested a rewrite. Smyth balked at this, as it would have meant going through the censorship process again. James S. Thompson, the president of McGraw-Hill, pointed out the U.S. Government Printing Office would be putting out an edition, probably more cheaply than he could, and there would likely be little profit in a McGraw-Hill edition. Smyth then turned back to Princeton University Press. He had only one condition: that he receive no royalties. Princeton University Press agreed, but added a stipulation of its own: that Groves's approval be secured. Smyth obtained this in a letter dated August 25, 1945.

Princeton University Press received a copy of the typescript lithograph edition with hand corrections from Smyth on August 17, 1945. The typographers had already started work from another copy. Maple Press of York, Pennsylvania, was lined up to do the printing. Because of wartime shortages, one of a publisher's biggest worries was finding adequate supplies of paper. Smith approached Manny and Leonard Relles from Central Paper, told them about the Smyth Report and its significance, and asked them if they could deliver 30 short tons (27 t) of paper to Maple Press in twelve days. They found a carload of paper on a siding in New England and sent it to York, providing enough paper for 30,000 copies, only half what Princeton University Press wanted. The first edition of 30,000 copies was printing when word was received that paper had been found for another 30,000 copies. The presses were held for three hours while the train made its way to a siding in York, where the paper was unloaded and brought to the printing plant by trucks.

There were minor differences between the original text and the version published by Princeton. In the Princeton publication, first and middle names were added instead of the previous use of abbreviations. In response to public concerns about radioactivity, Groves had text added to paragraph 12.18 explaining how the height of the explosions over Hiroshima and Nagasaki reduced fallout and allowed fission products to be drawn up into the upper atmosphere. He also had a one-sentence allusion to a poisoning effect of fission products in the production reactors redacted.

Later editions also incorporated changes. Four typographical errors were found, and the word "photon" in paragraph 1.44 aroused so much correspondence from readers who mistakenly believed that it should be "proton" that it was decided to re-word the paragraph. The British government became concerned that the Smyth Report did not cover the British part in the project, and issued its own 40-page report, which was incorporated into the fifth printing in November 1945 as Appendix 7. A two-page report by the Canadian government was added as Appendix 8.

The Smyth Report was translated into over 40 different languages. In addition to Princeton University Press, it was also published by the Government Printing Office, the Infantry Journal, and His Majesty's Stationery Office, and was reprinted in the October 1945 issue of Reviews of Modern Physics.

== Reception ==
The first copies were delivered to bookstores on September 10. Many were wary of it, due to its technical nature, and feared that sales would be low. An exception was Scribner's Bookstores, which placed large early orders. At Oak Ridge, the Manhattan Project's major production site, 8,000 copies were sold through the employee welfare organization. Similar arrangements were made for Los Alamos and Richland, Washington, which were located in areas where bookstores were scarce.

The Smyth Report was on The New York Times bestseller list from October 14, 1945, until January 20, 1946. Between 1946 and when the Smyth Report went out of print in 1973, it went through eight printings, and Princeton University Press sold 62,612 paperback and 64,129 hardback copies.

Groves did not intend the Smyth Report to be the last word on the project. It formed an addendum to the Manhattan District History, the official history of the project. This eventually consisted of 35 volumes with 39 appendices or supplements. It was written in the immediate postwar years by the chemists, metallurgists, physicists, and administrators who had worked on the project. Since there were no security restrictions, it covered every aspect of the Manhattan Project, but was itself classified. Most of it was declassified in the 1960s and 1970s and became available to scholars, except for some technical details on the construction of the bombs.

In her 2008 PhD dissertation, Rebecca Press Schwartz argued that Smyth's academic background and the Smyth Report's security-driven focus on physics at the expense of chemistry, metallurgy, and ordnance promoted a public perception of the Manhattan Project as primarily the achievement of physics and physicists. According to Schwartz, postwar histories and popular writing tended to follow the Smyth Report in this regard, creating a lasting historiographical legacy. "Ever since", wrote Jon Agar, "the atomic bomb has been seen as an achievement of physics." In particular, the prominence given to Einstein's mass–energy equivalence equation indelibly associated it with the Manhattan Project. The Smyth Report, wrote Robert P. Crease, "more than any other single document made E = mc^{2} an emblem of atomic energy and weaponry".

Groves felt that:

on the whole, and considering the rather difficult conditions under which it was prepared, the Smyth Report was extraordinarily successful in its efforts to distribute credit fairly and accurately. It would have been impossible to have prepared any document for publication covering the work of the Manhattan District that every reader would have found to his liking. But the fact is that all those who had the greatest knowledge of the subject were nearly unanimous in approving its publication as it was finally written. And there can be no question that it excellently served its purpose as an essential source of accurate information, particularly for a news-hungry America in the early days after Nagasaki.

== Russian translation ==
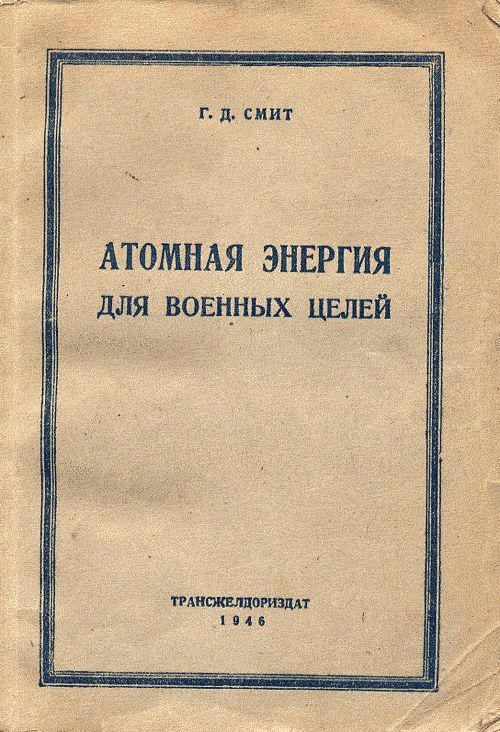
Cover of the Russian translation of the Smyth Report

The Soviet Union, eager to make progress on its own atomic weapon development and determined to follow the path that the Manhattan Project had found success with, commissioned a Russian translation of Atomic Energy for Military Purposes. It was in typeset form by mid-November 1945, and then was published by the State Railway Transportation Publishing House on January 30, 1946. Some 30,000 copies were printed and it was widely distributed to the many scientists and engineers working in the Soviet effort.

In a number of cases, the Soviets consulted the Smyth Report to see how they might deal with certain obstacles that had arisen in their project. The deletion between the original text and the Princeton version concerning the poisoning effect was soon noticed by the Russian translators, and only served to highlight its importance to the Soviet project.

As pioneering French nuclear weapons scientist Bertrand Goldschmidt later said,

The details revealed in the Smyth report were invaluable for any country launching into atomic work; for nothing is more important, when undertaking technical research over a wide field than knowing in advance which lines of approach can or cannot lead to success, even if this knowledge relates only to basic principles.

Nonetheless, Goldschmidt believed, just as Chadwick had ultimately believed, that publication of the report was on balance wise, in that not revealing anything about the new weapon would lead to a public hunger for information and resultant leaks and unwarranted disclosures of information.

Not everyone would agree: in 1947, United States Atomic Energy Commission member Lewis Strauss would call publication of the Smyth Report "a serious breach of security"; and in late 1952, President-elect Dwight D. Eisenhower would say the Smyth Report had given away too much information, including the exact locations of the atomic materials production plants.
