= Wil McCarthy =

American science fiction writer (born 1966)

- Born: September 16, 1966 (age 60); Princeton, New Jersey, U.S.
- Occupations: President, RavenBrick LLC
- Writing career
- Language: English
- Genre: Science fiction
- Subjects: Science and technology
- Notable awards: Prometheus Award
- Website: wilmccarthy.com

Wil McCarthy (born September 16, 1966) is an American science fiction novelist, president and co-founder of RavenBrick (a solar technology company), and the science columnist for Syfy. He currently resides in Colorado. Rich Man's Sky won the 2022 Prometheus Award. Beggar's Sky is a finalist for the 2025 Prometheus Award.

Wil McCarthy popularized the concept of programmable matter, which he calls wellstone.

== Bibliography ==
=== Novels ===
- Flies from the Amber. 1995.
- Murder in the Solid State. 1996.
- Bloom (1998) ISBN 0-345-40857-8
- Antediluvian (2019) ISBN 978-1481484312

Aggressor Six

1. Aggressor Six (1994) ISBN 0-451-45405-7
2. The Fall of Sirius (1996) ISBN 0-451-45485-5

The Queendom of Sol

1. The Collapsium (2000) ISBN 0-345-40856-X (Note: Nebula Award nominee.)
2. The Wellstone (2003) ISBN 0-553-58446-4
3. Lost in Transmission (2004) ISBN 0-553-58447-2
4. To Crush the Moon. 2005.

Rich Man's Sky

1. Rich Man's Sky (2021) ISBN 9781982125295
2. Poor Man's Sky (2023) ISBN 9781982192341
3. Beggar's Sky (2024) ISBN 9781982193188
4. Thieves' Sky (forthcoming, July 2026) ISBN 9781668073322

=== Short fiction ===
Stories (Note: Short stories unless otherwise noted.)

Title	Year	First published	Reprinted/collected	Notes
Wyatt Earp 2.0	2016	McCarthy, Wil (January–February 2016). "Wyatt Earp 2.0". Analog Science Fiction and Fact. 136 (1&2): 8–41.		Novella

- "Amerikano Hiaika", Aboriginal Science Fiction, May/June 1991.
- "Dirtyside Down", Universe 3, 1994.
- "The Dream of Houses", Analog, November 1995. (Note: Appeared on the Locus recommended reading list.)
- "The Dream of Castles", Analog, April 1997.
- "The Dream of Nations", Analog, October 1998.
- "Once Upon a Matter Crushed", Science Fiction Age, May 1999. (Note: Theodore Sturgeon Award Nominee.) (Note: Became the first portion of The Collapsium.)
- "No Job Too Small", Aboriginal Science Fiction, Spring 2001.
- "Pavement Birds", Analog, July/August 2002.
- "He Died that Day, in Thirty Years", Once Upon a Galaxy, 2002
- "Garbage Day", Analog, December 2002. (Note: Became part of The Wellstone.)

=== Non-fiction ===
- "Programmable Matter" (AKA "Programmable Matter: A Retrospective"), Nature, October 6, 2000. doi:10.1038/35036656.
- McCarthy, Wil (October 1, 2001). "Ultimate Alchemy". Wired. Vol. 9, no. 10.
- Hacking Matter (2003), ISBN 0-465-04428-X
- "This Looks Like a Job for...Superatoms", IEEE Spectrum, August 2005

———————

== Other media ==
=== Radio plays ===
- I Love Bees, writer

=== Radio appearances ===
- Coast to Coast AM, "Programmable Matter", April 18, 2003
- Coast to Coast AM, "Quantum Dots", April 26, 2004
