= Herbert H. Anderson =

American organic chemist (1913–2001)

Herbert H. Anderson (1913 – 2001) was an American organic chemist, a member of Glenn Seaborg's Met Lab group at Chicago during the Manhattan Project. Anderson was a co-inventor, with Larned B. Asprey, of the PUREX process for plutonium and uranium extraction.

After leaving the Met Lab, Anderson was at Harvard until 1952 (at one point working with Rubby Sherr and Kenneth Bainbridge in gold-forming nuclear transmutation experiments) and then for many years (at least 1953–1967) at the Chemistry Department, Drexel Institute of Technology, Philadelphia.
