= The Queendom of Sol =

Novel series by Wil McCarthy

- The Collapsium (2000); The Wellstone (2003); Lost in Transmission (2004); To Crush the Moon (2005)
- Author: Wil McCarthy
- Genre: Science fiction
- Publisher: Del Rey Books

The Queendom of Sol is a science fiction book series by American author Wil McCarthy. It includes The Collapsium (2000), The Wellstone (2003), Lost in Transmission (2004), and To Crush the Moon (2005). The first two novels of the series were also printed together as The Monarchs of Sol by Science Fiction Book Club (ISBN 0739433881).

The Queendom referred to is the present-day Kingdom of Tonga. In the Queendom of Sol, humanity has returned to monarchism as a stabilizing force in the face of accelerating technological change. At the time of the monarchy's establishment, the only remaining royal family on Earth is that of Tonga, whose surviving scion Tamra-Tamatra Lutui is recruited to become the queen of the Solar System.

== The Collapsium ==
The Collapsium is a 2000 hard science fiction novel and the first in the series. The first section of the novel is based on McCarthy's short story "Once Upon a Matter Crushed", which was a Sturgeon Award finalist. A reviewer stated McCarthy used postmodern literary technique in consciously creating a protagonist who is a "throwback" to the scientist-heroes of Golden Age SF.

== The Wellstone ==
The Wellstone is a 2003 novel, published as the second in the series. In The Wellstone, McCarthy explores the lives of immortal humans known as immorbids in the future. Nanotechnology has created the wellstone, programmable matter that can emulate nearly any other form of matter, and nanotech fax machines that can not only fabricate objects on demand, but store and retrieve human bodies (with minds intact), cure disease or reverse aging, or be used as teleporters. Ultradense exotic matter known as collapsium makes gravity manipulation and faster-than-light communication possible. Humanity has formed a solar system–wide society based on monarchy.

Many of the technologies in this novel are also described in McCarthy's 2003 nonfiction book, Hacking Matter.

== Lost in Transmission ==
Lost in Transmission, published in 2004, is the third in the series.

== To Crush the Moon ==
To Crush the Moon, published in 2005, is the last in the four-part series.

== Awards ==
Awards for The Queendom of Sol books
Year	Work	Award		Result	Ref.
2000	The Collapsium	Theodore Sturgeon Award	—	Finalist	
2002	The Collapsium	Nebula Award	Novel	Finalist	
2007	To Crush the Moon	Nebula Award	Novel	Finalist	

== Covers ==
The Collapsium

The Wellstone

To Crush the Moon
