= Henry DeWolf Smyth =

American physicist and diplomat (1898–1986)

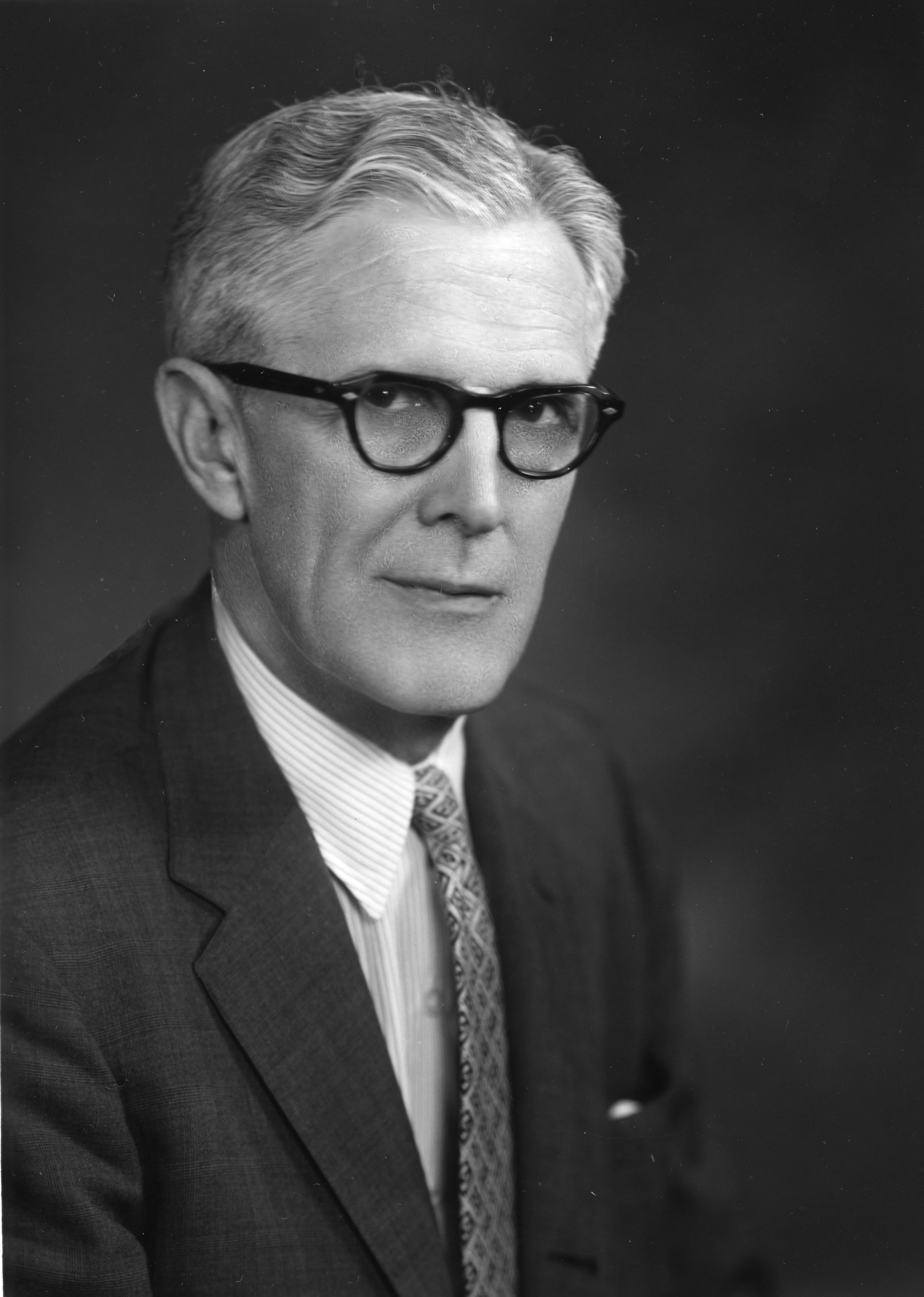
- Born: May 1, 1898; Clinton, New York, United States
- Died: September 11, 1986 (aged 88); Princeton, New Jersey, United States
- Education: Princeton University (BS, MS, PhD); Gonville and Caius College, Cambridge (PhD)
- Known for: Smyth Report
- Awards: Atoms for Peace Award (1968); Distinguished Honor Award (1970); Nuclear Statesman Award (1972)
- Scientific career
- Fields: Physics
- Workplaces: Princeton University
- Theses: The Radiating Potentials of Nitrogen (1921); A New Method for Studying Ionising Potentials (1923)
- Doctoral advisors: Karl Taylor Compton; Ernest Rutherford
- Other academic advisors: James Franck
- Doctoral students: Kenneth Bainbridge; Tung-Ching Chow
- Other notable students: Rubby Sherr

Henry DeWolf "Harry" Smyth (/ˈhɛnri dəˈwʊlf ˈsmaɪθ/; May 1, 1898 – September 11, 1986) was an American physicist, diplomat, and bureaucrat. He played a number of key roles in the early development of nuclear energy, as a participant in the Manhattan Project, a member of the U.S. Atomic Energy Commission (AEC), and U.S. ambassador to the International Atomic Energy Agency (IAEA).

Educated at Princeton University and the University of Cambridge, he was a faculty member in Princeton's Department of Physics from 1924 to 1966. He chaired the department from 1935 to 1949. His early research was on the ionization of gases, but his interests shifted toward nuclear physics beginning in the mid-1930s.

During World War II he was a member of the National Defense Research Committee's Uranium Committee and an administrator consultant on the Manhattan Project. He wrote the Manhattan Project's first public official history, which came to be known as the Smyth Report.

On the AEC from 1949 to 1954, Smyth initially argued unsuccessfully against a crash course to develop the hydrogen bomb and in favor of international control of nuclear weapons, before switching to support of the weapon. Following the 1954 Oppenheimer security hearing, Smyth was the sole member of the commission to vote against stripping J. Robert Oppenheimer's security clearance. As IAEA ambassador from 1961 to 1970 he played an important role in the realization of the Nuclear Non-Proliferation Treaty.

He received the Atoms for Peace Award in 1968 and the U.S. State Department's Distinguished Honor Award in 1970. The American Nuclear Society's award for "nuclear statesmanship", of which he was the first recipient, is named in his honor.

== Personal life ==
Smyth was born May 1, 1898, in Clinton, New York, to Ruth Anne Phelps and Charles Henry Smyth, Jr., a professor of geology at Hamilton College. Woodrow Wilson, then President of Princeton University, convinced Smyth père to join the faculty at Princeton, and in 1905 the family moved to Princeton, New Jersey.

Henry DeWolf Smyth's elder brother, Charles Phelps Smyth, attended the same primary and secondary schools as Henry. The elder brother also received undergraduate and master's degrees from Princeton, but in chemistry. He earned his PhD at Harvard University but like Henry and their father became a faculty member at Princeton. Both brothers served in the Chemical Warfare Service in World War I and on the Manhattan Project.

Henry DeWolf Smyth married Mary de Coningh on June 30, 1936. He was a member of the Democratic Party.

== Education ==
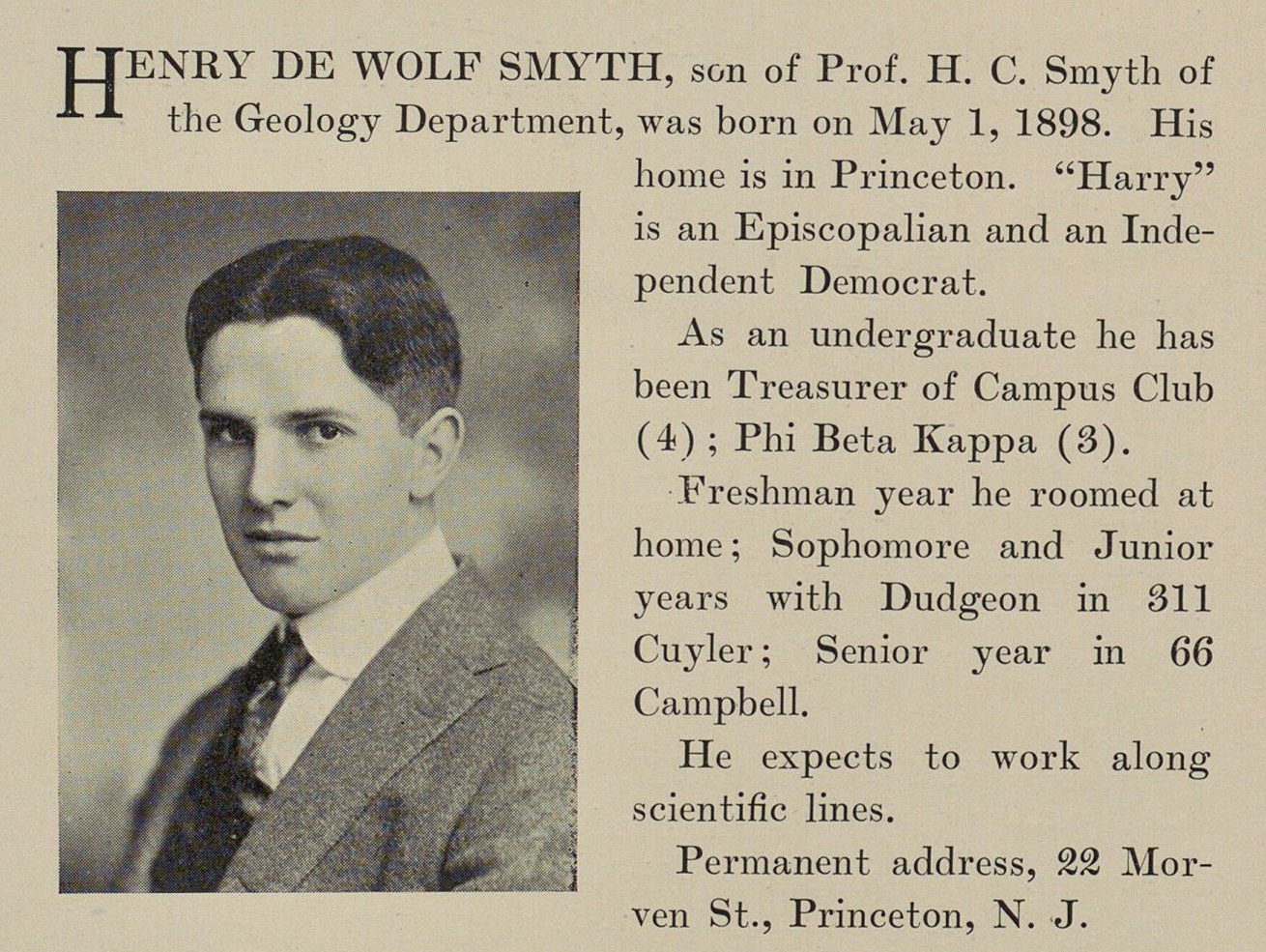
Smyth in the Princeton University yearbook, 1918

In Princeton, Smyth attended Miss Fine's School, which later became the Princeton Day School, and the Lawrenceville School. After graduating from Lawrenceville in 1914, he entered Princeton University, where he received a classical education and graduated first in his class in 1918. He was elected to Phi Beta Kappa and Sigma Xi.

Smyth remained at Princeton to do graduate work; he and Allen Shenstone were the only graduate students in the Department of Physics. Smyth earned a master's degree and PhD in physics from Princeton in 1920 and 1921, respectively, studying under Karl Taylor Compton. The U.S. National Research Council awarded Smyth a fellowship, and he joined the Cavendish Laboratory at the University of Cambridge. There he studied under Ernest Rutherford and earned a second PhD in 1923. At Cambridge he was affiliated with Caius College and formed a friendship with Pyotr Kapitsa, a Soviet physicist who would go on to win the Nobel Prize in Physics and work briefly on the Soviet atomic bomb project.

== Early career ==
During World War I, Smyth worked in the Chemical Warfare Service, and at the Aberdeen Proving Ground. After earning his second PhD, he returned to Princeton for the last year of his NRC fellowship. During his early years on the Princeton faculty he lived in the Graduate College west of the main campus. He was appointed an instructor in 1924, an assistant professor in 1925, an associate professor in 1929, and a full professor in 1936. In 1935 he became chairman of the Department of Physics, a position he held until 1949. During 1931–32 he was a Guggenheim Fellow at the University of Göttingen, where he studied the spectra of triatomic molecules, particularly carbon dioxide, with James Franck.

Smyth's early research was in spectroscopy, focusing on ionization of gases by impact with electrons as a means to study the gases' critical energy levels. He published his first research article, on the radiating potentials of nitrogen gas, in 1919; this became the basis of his first dissertation. In a 1922 article, he described a method for determining the ionization energy of a molecule using anode rays and demonstrated the method on mercury vapor. In the following year he used this same method to study nitrogen. He also published on the ionization of hydrogen, carbon dioxide, nitrous oxide, nitrogen dioxide, water vapor, sulfur dioxide, and carbon disulfide. As Robert H. Dicke, Val Logsdon Fitch, and Rubby Sherr wrote in 1989, "By 1935 his 30 published papers established him as a leading experimentalist" in the field. In 1929 Kenneth Bainbridge completed his PhD dissertation at Princeton working under Smyth, using anode rays to search for element 87.

In the mid-1930s, Smyth began to shift his interest to nuclear physics, inspired by James Chadwick's discovery of the neutron, John Cockcroft and Ernest Walton splitting the atom, and Ernest Lawrence's invention of the cyclotron. Three of his last research articles concerned detection of triatomic hydrogen and helium-3. His appointment as department chair forced him to devote more time to administrative work, at the expense of research. Richard Feynman had achieved an unprecedented perfect score on the Princeton University entrance exams, and applied for admission. While department chair, Smyth questioned his admission, writing to Philip M. Morse to ask: "Is Feynman Jewish? We have no definite rule against Jews but like to keep their proportion in our department reasonably small". Morse conceded that Feynman was indeed Jewish, but reassured Smyth that Feynman's "physiognomy and manner, however, show no trace of this characteristic". As department chair, he had two cyclotrons built at Princeton, one in 1935 and the other in 1946.

He was a member of the subcommittee on physics of the National Research Council from 1928 to 1935. In 1936 Smyth responded to media criticism of basic science research as "useless" by suggesting that seemingly useless research could turn out to be very useful later.

== World War II ==
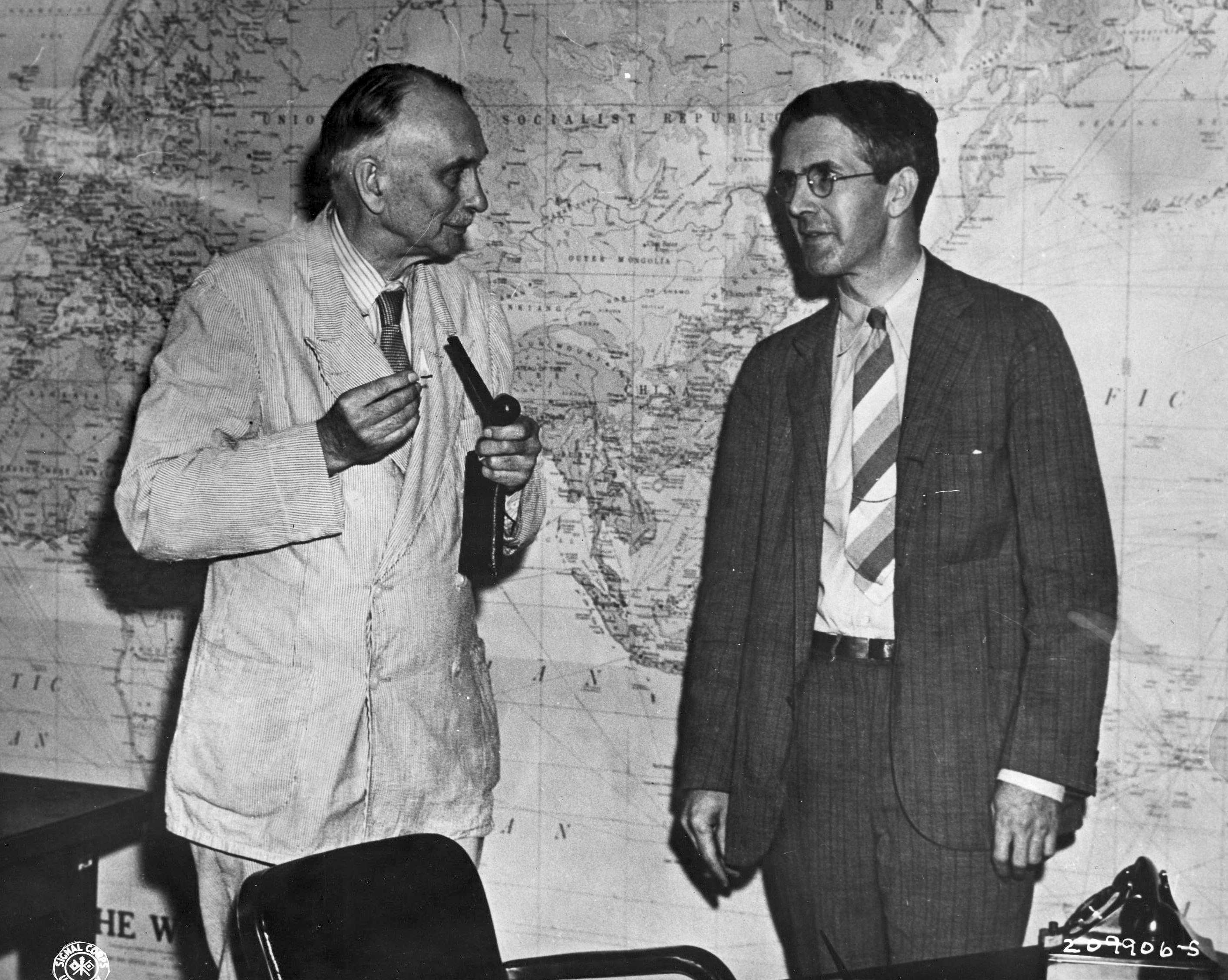
Smyth (right) with Richard Tolman, who chaired the Postwar Policy Committee.

During World War II, Smyth was involved in helping the United States build the atomic bomb. From 1941 to 1943 he was a member of the National Defense Research Committee (NDRC)'s Uranium Committee charged with producing fissile material for the bomb. Smyth proposed the electromagnetic methods that were used to enrich the first large U-235 samples for the project. He also oversaw a nuclear fission-related project for the Office of Scientific Research and Development (OSRD). During 1943–45 he was a consultant to the Manhattan Project, which built and tested the weapon, and associate director of the University of Chicago's Metallurgical Laboratory, which was part of the Manhattan Project. At the Metallurgical Laboratory he headed research on heavy water. He remained chairman of Princeton's physics department throughout the war, and the attendant obligations forced him to participate less actively in the project's later stages.

In August 1944 General Leslie Groves, director of the Manhattan Project, appointed Smyth to the Postwar Policy Committee, which was charged with proposing government policy for research and development of atomic energy after the war was over. The committee recommended that a national commission modeled on the OSRD fund and oversee continued production and fundamental research in government laboratories, universities, and the private sector.

=== Smyth Report ===
Smyth advocated within the NDRC for a comprehensive report to be released to the public following the weapon's first use. Vannevar Bush, who as civilian director of the OSRD oversaw the NDRC, agreed, and selected Smyth to write the report following the recommendation of NDRC chairman James Bryant Conant. Groves granted Smyth unlimited access, waiving his usual security-minded insistence on compartmentalization. Smyth wrote what became known as the Smyth Report in his office in Princeton's Palmer Laboratory, which later became the Frist Campus Center.

The report was first released to the press late on Saturday, August 11, 1945 (with a 9 p.m. radio embargo and newspaper embargo the next morning), days after the attacks on Hiroshima and Nagasaki. The Government Printing Office could not print enough copies to meet demand, so Smyth persuaded the director of the Princeton University Press to print more. By the end of the Press's 1946 fiscal year it had printed 103,000 copies. It printed 126,741 overall. Smyth held the copyright to the work to prevent others from claiming it, but he permitted widespread reproduction, essentially releasing it into the public domain. He later reported that "my financial balance from the Smyth Report is minus two dollars, the copyright fee."

In the report, Smyth called it "a semi-technical report which it is hoped men of science in this country can use to help their fellow citizens in reaching wise decisions" in the new Atomic Age. At the urging of his superiors, he removed several discussions of the bomb's moral implications and its creators' unease. Rebecca Schwartz argued that Smyth's academic background and his report's security-driven focus on physics at the expense of engineering caused the Smyth Report to promote a public perception of the Manhattan Project as primarily an achievement of physicists.

== Postwar ==
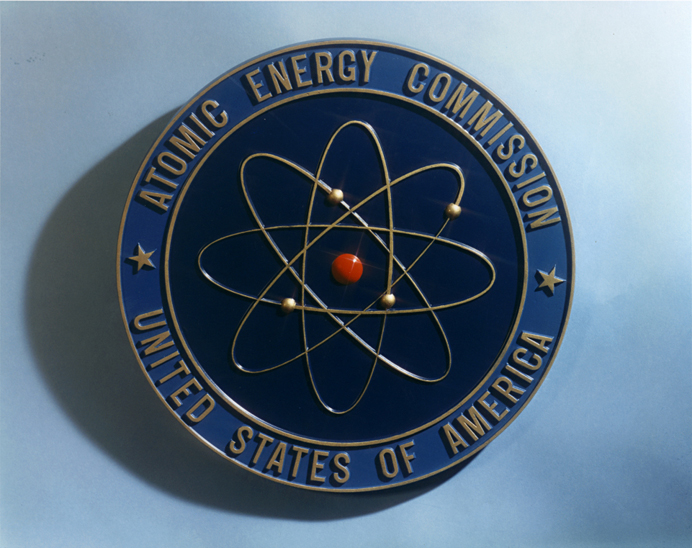
Smyth was a member of the U.S. Atomic Energy Commission from 1949 to 1954.

Following the war, Smyth returned full-time to his duties at Princeton. He continued to chair the Physics Department and was named the Joseph Henry Professor of Physics in 1946. During this time he spoke and wrote regularly about nuclear energy and science policy and worked to expand the physics department.

In early 1949, physicist Robert Bacher stepped down from the Atomic Energy Commission. He and AEC Chairman David Lilienthal wanted a physicist to replace Bacher, and they ultimately recommended Smyth for the position. President Harry Truman nominated Smyth to the AEC later that year, prompting Smyth to resign as Physics Department chairman. (His old colleague Allen Shenstone took up the post.) Smyth was the commission's only scientist. He spent his first weeks in the position attending hearings of the U.S. Congress's Joint Committee on Atomic Energy. Led by Senator Bourke Hickenlooper, the hearings inquired into a small amount of uranium that was alleged to be unaccounted for in AEC labs. Smyth later condemned the hearings as grounded in misconceptions about the work of nuclear scientists.

Following the Soviet Union's successful atomic bomb test in August 1949, the United States was considering a crash course to develop a hydrogen bomb. The AEC's nine-member General Advisory Committee, chaired by J. Robert Oppenheimer, recommended unanimously in October 1949 against such a course. Although Smyth did not think that committee's report was well-constructed, he also initially opposed an H-bomb program. In early November he became one of three of the five AEC commissioners to take a stance in opposition. After looking at how the proposed weapon might be used and at what the domestic and international reaction would be to any use, Smyth felt that the H-bomb would be of little utility, and instead favored reopening discussions towards the international control of nuclear weapons.

But by late January 1950, Smyth's position on the question was wavering towards being in favor of moving forward with development. In any case, on January 31, 1950, Truman decided to authorize a hydrogen bomb program. Smyth became a supporter of the weapon, and in February 1950, endorsed a specific program for the future production of H-bombs. In his autobiography, Smyth's Princeton colleague John Archibald Wheeler recalled that Smyth recruited him to the hydrogen bomb project and expressed support for the project in response to the Soviet test. Indeed, by the time of that test Smyth was looking for ways to use a successful thermonuclear explosion's psychological impact to benefit American foreign policy aims. Urged by a journal editor to publish his recollections of the H-bomb decision, Smyth drafted several attempts at an article but eventually abandoned it. Nonetheless, in subsequent years Smyth became defensive about his shift in position on the hydrogen bomb, saying that he had maintained a consistent thought process regarding it and that once his questions about the utility of the weapon had been resolved, his conclusion about the question changed accordingly.

In 1953 Smyth and John A. Hall served as principal advisors to President Dwight Eisenhower in preparing his Atoms for Peace speech to the United Nations. The IAEA traces its origins to this speech.

The 1954 Oppenheimer security hearing consisted of a panel considering whether to rescind Oppenheimer's security clearance on suspicion that he was disloyal or a security risk, with the result that the panel decided to do so. Smyth was still the only scientist on the commission. Despite his personal dislike of Oppenheimer and pressure from the commission's new chairman, Lewis Strauss, in confirmation of the panel's decision Smyth was the sole commissioner to vote against stripping Oppenheimer's clearance on June 29, 1954. Smyth's rationale for what McGeorge Bundy has called his "lonely but powerful dissent" was that the evidence against Oppenheimer was weak and even contrived and was easily outweighed by Oppenheimer's contributions to U.S. nuclear weapons efforts. Smyth resigned from the AEC on September 30 of that year out of frustration with Strauss. Eulogizing Oppenheimer in 1967, Smyth said of Oppenheimer's treatment, "Such a wrong can never be righted; such a blot on our history never erased.... We regret that his great work for his country was repaid so shabbily".

Smyth returned to Princeton and served on several high-level administrative committees. This work included advising on the construction of a particle accelerator built jointly with the University of Pennsylvania and overseeing Project Matterhorn, which became the Princeton Plasma Physics Laboratory. He chaired the committee that chose Robert F. Goheen to succeed Harold W. Dodds as President of Princeton. He also served as a consultant on nuclear power to Congress, the AEC, and private industry. He retired from Princeton in 1966.

Smyth was a fellow of the American Physical Society and served as its vice president in 1956 and its president in 1957. He was elected to the American Philosophical Society in 1947 and the American Academy of Arts and Sciences in 1956. He was a member of the Council on Foreign Relations.

== IAEA representative ==
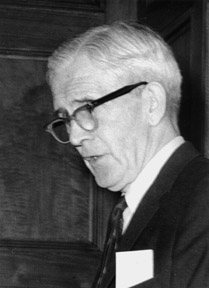
Smyth in later years

President John F. Kennedy appointed Smyth as the representative of the United States to the IAEA, a position with the rank of Ambassador. Smyth assumed the position on June 13, 1961, following confirmation by the U.S. Senate. Smyth shared the organization's stated goal of developing nuclear technology for peaceful purposes. He helped develop what Glenn Seaborg later called "an unprecedented atmosphere of rapport" at the IAEA and played a crucial role in the adoption of the Nuclear Non-Proliferation Treaty in 1970. He retired from the IAEA on August 31, 1970.

In September 1961, Harlan Cleveland, then Assistant Secretary of State for International Organization Affairs, appointed Smyth to chair a committee to review U.S. policy toward the IAEA. The committee's report affirmed the importance of civilian uses of nuclear energy. In 1962 Cleveland again tapped Smyth, this time as an adviser to the State Department on the IAEA. In this position Smyth advocated for a transfer of national nuclear safeguards to the IAEA.

In December 1965, Smyth was elected Chairman of the Board of the Universities Research Association. During Smyth's tenure, the URA signed a contract with the U.S. government to construct and operate the National Accelerator Laboratory, which later became known as Fermilab. Construction began, and research programs were planned. Smyth stepped down as chairman in 1970 but remained on the board. He also served on the board of Associated Universities, Inc., which operated the Brookhaven National Laboratory and National Radio Astronomy Observatory.

Smyth received the Atoms for Peace Award in 1968 (with Sigvard Eklund and Abdus Salam) and the State Department's Distinguished Honor Award in 1970. In 1972 he became the first recipient of an award for nuclear statesmanship given jointly by the American Nuclear Society and the Nuclear Energy Institute. By 1974, when the award was next given, it had been named the Henry DeWolf Smyth Nuclear Statesman Award.

== Later life and legacy ==
After retiring from the IAEA, Smyth remained active. On the 40th anniversary of the Trinity test in 1985, he denounced President Ronald Reagan's Strategic Defense Initiative and called for joint arms reductions between the United States and the Soviet Union.

He died September 11, 1986, in Princeton. The immediate cause was cardiac arrest, though he had long battled cancer.

Smyth endowed a chair in the Physics Department in his will. The sitting Henry DeWolf Smyth Professor of Physics is Suzanne Staggs.

The Smyth Report has remained the most significant release of technical details regarding atomic weapons ever made. Smyth was known for having a careful, judicious manner, and viewed less favorably people who he said became too "emotional" during a decision-making process. At Smyth's memorial service, physicist Isidor Isaac Rabi spoke in praise of Smyth's dissent in the Oppenheimer security hearings, saying that "one thinks of a supreme moment in a person's life when he stood against odds and did the right thing. That was Harry Smyth's fortune and Harry Smyth's greatness".
