= Zhou Tongqing =

Chinese optical physicist

Zhou Tongqing (Chinese: 周同庆; 21 December 1907 – 13 February 1989), also known as Tung-Ching Chow, was a Chinese optical physicist. After earning his Ph.D. from Princeton University, he taught at Peking University, National Central University, Shanghai Jiao Tong University, and Fudan University. He led the development of China's first X-ray tube in 1953 and was elected a founding member of the Chinese Academy of Sciences in 1955. His research was disrupted when he was subject to severe persecution during the Anti-Rightist Campaign and the Cultural Revolution. Although later politically rehabilitated, he was plagued by poor health for the rest of his life.

== Early life and education ==
Zhou was born on 21 December 1907 in Kunshan, Jiangsu, during the Qing dynasty. After graduating in 1929 from the Department of Physics of Tsinghua University, he won a Boxer Indemnity Scholarship to study at Princeton University in the United States.

He studied under Karl Taylor Compton and Henry D. Smyth at Princeton and excelled in his research. He published three papers in major physical journals. His doctoral thesis, "The Spectrum of Sulphur Dioxide", was published in Physical Review in October 1933.

== Career ==
=== Republic of China ===
After earning his Ph.D., Zhou returned to China in 1933 and accepted a professorship in the Department of Physics of Peking University, where he established an optical lab. In 1936, Zhou was appointed Chair of the Physics Department of National Central University (NCU) in Nanjing. A year later, however, the Empire of Japan invaded China and occupied Nanjing, China's then capital. NCU evacuated Nanjing and moved with the Nationalist government to the wartime capital of Chongqing.

In 1943, Zhou transferred to National Chiao Tung University, then also exiled in Chongqing. To augment his meagre income as a wartime professor, he also took up a technical position in the Kuomintang's National Revolutionary Army with the rank of a field officer. This later became a major reason why he was not trusted in Communist China.

After the surrender of Japan in 1945, Chiao Tung University returned to Shanghai. Zhou served as dean of the university's School of Sciences and established its nuclear physics lab.

=== People's Republic of China ===
After the Communist Party defeated the Kuomintang in the Chinese Civil War, the new government reorganized China's universities on the Soviet model, and part of the Physics Department of Chiao Tung University (now called Shanghai Jiao Tong University) was merged into Fudan University. Zhou, together with his assistant and former student Fang Junxin (方俊鑫), moved to Fudan as part of the reorganization.

In 1953, Fudan University established the X-ray Tube Laboratory with Zhou as its director and Fang as vice director. Soon they developed China's first X-ray tube. He also made contributions to the research of electric discharge in gases and vacuum tube technology. In 1955, Zhou was elected as a founding member of the Chinese Academy of Sciences.

== Persecution and death ==
During the Anti-Rightist Campaign, Zhou was denounced as a "bourgeois intellectual" and underwent struggle sessions from 1958 until 1961. Although he was one of China's top experts and pioneers in optical physics, he was sidelined when Fudan created its laser research group in the early 1960s.

When the Cultural Revolution started in 1966, many prominent academics came under persecution. At the Fudan Physics Department, Zhou and his colleague Mao Qingxian (毛清献) were targeted for the worst treatment. The beatings and public humiliation drove Mao to suicide. Although the worst atrocities were over by 1969 and Zhou was later politically rehabilitated, he suffered from poor health for the rest of his life.

On 13 February 1989, Zhou died in Shanghai at the age of 81.
