= Aggressor Six =

1994 novel by Wil McCarthy

- First edition
- Author: Wil McCarthy
- Cover artist: Bob Eggleton
- Language: English
- Genre: Science fiction
- Published: Roc Books
- ISBN: 978-0451454058

Aggressor Six (1994) is one of the earliest works by science fiction writer Wil McCarthy.

== Plot ==
Humanity is under attack by a technologically superior alien race known as "Waisters", who threaten to exterminate the human race. Unlike McCarthy's later books, which focus on how technology might change the definition of what it means to be human, Aggressor Six is military science fiction. The novel is, however, set apart from many other military science fiction novels in that it maintains McCarthy's strict adherence to technical scientific realism. This is particularly evident during the combat scenes – the technological superiority of the aliens renders impractical the standard naval models of combat used in many works of science fiction, requiring a re-examination of the mechanics of space combat. The novel also proposes that aliens, if encountered, will be truly alien – that is, driven by desires and motives which are not immediately obvious to humans.

== Sequels ==
McCarthy wrote a sequel, The Fall of Sirius, in 1996, and created an outline for a third novel that was never written, but which can be found on his website.
