= Hacking Matter =

Book by Wil McCarthy

Hacking Matter: Levitating Chairs, Quantum Mirages, and the Infinite Weirdness of Programmable Atoms
- Hardcover edition
- Author: Wil McCarthy
- Language: English
- Subject: Material science, nanotechnology
- Publisher: Basic Books
- Publication date: 2003
- Pages: 240
- ISBN: 0-465-04428-X

Hacking Matter is a 2003 book by Wil McCarthy. It deals with "programmable matter" (like colloidal films, bulk crystals, and quantum dots) that, he predicts, will someday be able mimic the properties of any natural atom, and ultimately also non-natural atoms. McCarthy predicts that programmable matter will someday change human life profoundly, and that its users will have the ability to program matter itself - to change it, from a computer, from hard to soft, from paper to stone, from fluorescent to super-reflective to invisible. In his science fiction, he calls this technology "Wellstone".

The book includes interviews with researchers who are developing the technology, describes how they are learning to control its electronic, optical, thermal, magnetic, and mechanical properties, and speculates on its future development.
