= Rubby Sherr =

American nuclear physicist (1913–2013)

- Born: September 14, 1913; Long Branch, New Jersey
- Died: July 8, 2013 (aged 99); Haverford, Pennsylvania
- Education: New York University; Princeton University
- Known for: Contribution to the Manhattan Project, experimental proof of Fermi's interaction
- Scientific career
- Fields: Nuclear physics
- Doctoral advisor: Henry DeWolf Smyth

Rubby Sherr (Note: Pronounced "Ruby".) (September 14, 1913 – July 8, 2013) was an American nuclear physicist who co-invented a key component of the first nuclear weapon while participating in the Manhattan Project during the Second World War. His academic career spanned nearly eight decades, including almost 40 years working at Princeton University.

== Early life and education ==
Sherr was born to Lithuanian Jewish immigrants in Long Branch, New Jersey, in 1913. After graduating from Lakewood High School, he attended New York University at his mother's behest, gaining a bachelor's degree in physics in 1934. He then went to study at Princeton University, where he obtained a doctorate in physics in 1938. Sherr began his experimental career at Harvard University, where he worked with the university's then-new cyclotron, leading experimental research into nuclear transmutation, including synthesis of precious metals such as gold.

== Manhattan Project ==
In 1942, Sherr joined the MIT Radiation Laboratory, where he worked to develop new airborne radar systems. In 1944, he became involved with the Manhattan Project, which was tasked with creating the first nuclear weapon. Together with Klaus Fuchs, Sherr developed a key component of the bomb's triggering mechanism, the Fuchs–Sherr polonium-beryllium modulated neutron initiator. On July 16, 1945, Sherr was present at the Trinity nuclear test in New Mexico. He later recalled thinking during the test, "'This is the greatest scientific experiment of all time' – it was certainly the biggest. Then the horror sank in that the thing had actually worked, followed by relief that the atmosphere hadn't ignited, as some had feared it would."

== Academic career ==
Sherr became an assistant professor of physics at Princeton University in 1946, an associate professor in 1949, and a full professor in 1955. In 1953, he provided experimental evidence of Fermi's interaction, a theoretical explanation for the beta decay phenomenon. Between 1955 and 1971, he headed an Atomic Energy Commission-contracted nuclear research project, and oversaw the development of Princeton's AVF cyclotron in 1970. Sherr retired from Princeton in 1982, but remained active in the research community for the rest of his life. He published over 100 articles in scientific journals during his career.

== Personal life ==
Sherr was married to Rita "Pat" Sherr, with whom he had two daughters. In 1998, after his wife's death, he moved to a retirement community in Haverford, Pennsylvania, where he lived until his death. In his spare time, Sherr was an avid fly fisherman, birdwatcher, and folk music enthusiast who counted the musicologist Alan Lomax among his friends. He died at the age of 99 on July 8, 2013. He was survived by his daughters and a granddaughter.
