= Nuclear transmutation =

Conversion of an atom from one element to another

Illustration of a proton–proton chain, from hydrogen forming deuterium, helium-3, and regular helium-4.

Nuclear transmutation is the conversion of one chemical element or an isotope into another chemical element. Nuclear transmutation occurs in any process where the number of protons or neutrons in the nucleus of an atom is changed.

A transmutation can be achieved either by nuclear reactions (in which an outside particle reacts with a nucleus) or by radioactive decay, where no outside cause is needed.

Natural transmutation by stellar nucleosynthesis in the past created most of the heavier chemical elements in the known existing universe, and continues to take place to this day, creating the vast majority of the most common elements in the universe, including helium, oxygen and carbon. Most stars carry out transmutation through fusion reactions involving hydrogen and helium, while much larger stars are also capable of fusing heavier elements up to iron late in their evolution.

As a star begins to fuse heavier elements, substantially less energy is released from each fusion reaction. This continues until it reaches iron, which is produced by an endothermic reaction (one that consumes energy). No heavier element can be produced in such conditions. Elements heavier than iron, such as gold or lead, are created through elemental transmutations that can naturally occur in supernovae. One goal of alchemy, the transmutation of base substances into gold, is now known to be impossible by chemical means but possible by physical means.

One type of natural transmutation observable in the present occurs when certain radioactive elements present in nature spontaneously decay by a process that causes transmutation, such as alpha or beta decay. An example is the natural decay of potassium-40 to argon-40, which forms most of the argon in Earth's atmosphere. Also on Earth, natural transmutations from the different mechanisms of natural nuclear reactions occur, as a result of cosmic ray bombardment of elements (for example, to form carbon-14) and also occasionally from natural neutron bombardment (for example, see natural nuclear fission reactor).

Artificial transmutation may occur in machinery that has enough energy to cause changes in the nuclear structure of the elements. Such machines include particle accelerators and tokamak reactors. Conventional fission power reactors also cause artificial transmutation, not from the power of the machine, but by exposing elements to neutrons produced by fission from an artificially produced nuclear chain reaction. For instance, when a uranium atom is bombarded with slow neutrons, fission takes place. This releases, on average, three neutrons and a large amount of energy. The released neutrons then cause fission of other uranium atoms, until all of the available uranium is exhausted. This is called a chain reaction.

Artificial nuclear transmutation has been considered as a possible mechanism for reducing the volume and hazard of radioactive waste.

== History ==
=== Alchemy ===
The term transmutation dates back to alchemy. Alchemists pursued the philosopher's stone, capable of chrysopoeia – the transformation of base metals into gold. While alchemists often understood chrysopoeia as a metaphor for a mystical or religious process, some practitioners adopted a literal interpretation and tried to make gold through physical experimentation. The impossibility of the metallic transmutation had been debated amongst alchemists, philosophers and scientists since the Middle Ages. Pseudo-alchemical transmutation was outlawed and publicly mocked beginning in the fourteenth century. Alchemists like Michael Maier and Heinrich Khunrath wrote tracts exposing fraudulent claims of gold making. By the 1720s, there were no longer any respectable figures pursuing the physical transmutation of substances into gold. Antoine Lavoisier, in the 18th century, replaced the alchemical theory of elements with the modern theory of chemical elements, and John Dalton further developed the notion of atoms (from the alchemical theory of corpuscles) to explain various chemical processes. The disintegration of atoms is a distinct process involving much greater energies than could be achieved by alchemists.

=== Modern physics ===
It was first consciously applied to modern physics by Frederick Soddy when he, along with Ernest Rutherford in 1901, discovered that radioactive thorium was converting itself into radium. At the moment of realization, Soddy later recalled, he shouted out: "Rutherford, this is transmutation!" Rutherford snapped back, "For Christ's sake, Soddy, don't call it transmutation. They'll have our heads off as alchemists." Rutherford and Soddy were observing natural transmutation as a part of radioactive decay of the alpha decay type.

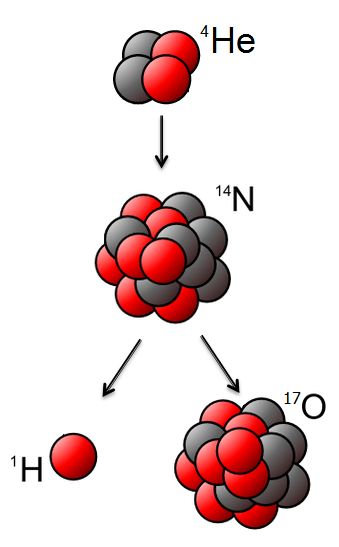
Transmutation of nitrogen into oxygen

The first artificial transmutation was accomplished in 1925 by Patrick Blackett, a research fellow working under Rutherford, with the transmutation of nitrogen into oxygen, using alpha particles directed at nitrogen ^{14}N + α → ^{17}O + p. Rutherford had shown in 1919 that a proton (he called it a hydrogen atom) was emitted from alpha bombardment experiments, but he had no information about the residual nucleus. Blackett's 1921–1924 experiments provided the first experimental evidence of an artificial nuclear transmutation reaction. Blackett correctly identified the underlying integration process and the identity of the residual nucleus.

In 1932, a fully artificial nuclear reaction and nuclear transmutation was achieved by Rutherford's colleagues John Cockcroft and Ernest Walton, who used artificially accelerated protons against lithium-7 to split the nucleus into two alpha particles. The feat was popularly known as "splitting the atom", although it was not the modern nuclear fission reaction discovered in 1938 by Otto Hahn, Lise Meitner and their assistant Fritz Strassmann in heavy elements. In 1941, Rubby Sherr, Kenneth Bainbridge and Herbert Lawrence Anderson reported the nuclear transmutation of mercury into gold.

Later in the twentieth century the transmutation of elements within stars was elaborated, accounting for the relative abundance of heavier elements in the universe. Save for the first five elements, which were produced in the Big Bang and other cosmic ray processes, stellar nucleosynthesis accounted for the abundance of all elements heavier than boron. In their 1957 paper Synthesis of the Elements in Stars, William Alfred Fowler, Margaret Burbidge, Geoffrey Burbidge, and Fred Hoyle explained how the abundances of essentially all but the lightest chemical elements could be explained by the process of nucleosynthesis in stars.

==== Transmutation of other elements into gold ====
The alchemical tradition sought to turn the "base metal", lead, into gold. As a nuclear transmutation, it requires far less energy to turn gold into lead; for example, this would occur via neutron capture and beta decay if gold were left in a nuclear reactor for a sufficiently long period of time. In 1980, Glenn Seaborg, K. Aleklett, and a team at Lawrence Berkeley National Laboratory's Bevatron succeeded in producing a minuscule amount of gold from bismuth, at a net energy loss.

In 2002 and 2004, CERN scientists at the Super Proton Synchrotron reported producing a minuscule amount of gold nuclei from induced photon emissions within deliberate near-miss collisions of lead nuclei. In 2022, CERN's ISOLDE team reported producing 18 gold nuclei from proton bombardment of a uranium target. In 2025, CERN's ALICE experiment team announced that over the previous decade, they had used the Large Hadron Collider to replicate the 2002 SPS mechanisms at higher energies. A total of roughly 260 billion gold nuclei were created over three experimental runs, a minuscule amount massing about 90 picograms.

Startup Marathon Fusion proposes a theoretical way to make gold from mercury: use a nuclear fusion reactor to bombard mercury with high-energy neutrons, specifically ^{198}Hg, an isotope with 10% abundance. This creates the unstable ^{197}Hg, which then decays into stable gold (^{197}Au) with a half-life of approximately 64 hours.

== Transmutation in the universe ==
The Big Bang is thought to be the origin of the hydrogen (including all deuterium) and helium in the universe. Hydrogen and helium together account for 98% of the mass of ordinary matter in the universe, while the other 2% makes up everything else. The Big Bang also produced small amounts of lithium, beryllium and perhaps boron. More lithium, beryllium and boron were produced later, in a natural nuclear reaction, cosmic ray spallation.

Stellar nucleosynthesis is responsible for all of the other elements occurring naturally in the universe as stable isotopes and primordial nuclide, from carbon to uranium. These occurred after the Big Bang, during star formation. Some lighter elements from carbon to iron were formed in stars and released into space by asymptotic giant branch (AGB) stars. These are a type of red giant that "puffs" off its outer atmosphere, containing some elements from carbon to nickel and iron. Nuclides with mass number greater than 64 are predominantly produced by neutron capture processes—the s-process and r-process–in supernova explosions and neutron star mergers.

The Solar System is thought to have condensed approximately 4.6 billion years before the present, from a cloud of hydrogen and helium containing heavier elements in dust grains formed previously by a large number of such stars. These grains contained the heavier elements formed by transmutation earlier in the history of the universe.

All of these natural processes of transmutation in stars are continuing today, in our own galaxy and in others. Stars fuse hydrogen and helium into heavier and heavier elements (up to iron), producing energy. For example, the observed light curves of supernova stars such as SN 1987A show them blasting large amounts (comparable to the mass of Earth) of radioactive nickel and cobalt into space. However, little of this material reaches Earth. Most natural transmutation on the Earth today is mediated by cosmic rays (such as production of carbon-14) and by the radioactive decay of radioactive primordial nuclides left over from the initial formation of the Solar System (such as potassium-40, uranium and thorium), plus the decay chain of products of these nuclides (radium, radon, polonium, etc.).

== Artificial transmutation of nuclear waste ==
=== Overview ===
Transmutation of transuranium elements (i.e. Elements heavier then uranium) such as the isotopes of plutonium (about 1wt% in the light water reactors' used nuclear fuel or the minor actinides (MAs, i.e. neptunium, americium, and curium), about 0.1wt% each in light water reactors' used nuclear fuel) has the potential to help solve some problems posed by the management of radioactive waste by reducing the proportion of long-lived isotopes it contains. (This does not rule out the need for a deep geological repository for most of the fission products in high level radioactive waste.) When irradiated with fast neutrons in a nuclear reactor, these isotopes can undergo nuclear fission, destroying the original actinide isotope and producing a spectrum of radioactive and nonradioactive fission products.

Ceramic targets containing actinides can be bombarded with neutrons to induce transmutation reactions to remove the most difficult long-lived species. These can consist of actinide-containing solid solutions such as (Am,Zr)N, (Am,Y)N, (Zr,Cm)O_{2}, (Zr,Cm,Am)O_{2}, (Zr,Am,Y)O_{2} or just actinide phases such as AmO_{2}, NpO_{2}, NpN, AmN mixed with some inert phases such as MgO, MgAl_{2}O_{4}, (Zr,Y)O_{2}, TiN and ZrN. The role of non-radioactive inert phases is mainly to provide stable mechanical behaviour to the target under neutron irradiation.

There are issues with this P&T (partitioning and transmutation) strategy however:

- it is limited by the costly and cumbersome need to separate long-lived fission product isotopes before they can undergo transmutation.
- some long-lived fission products, including the nuclear waste product caesium-137, are unable to capture enough neutrons for effective transmutation to occur due to their small neutron cross-section and resultingly low capture rate.

The new study led by Satoshi Chiba at Tokyo Tech (called "Method to Reduce Long-lived Fission Products by Nuclear Transmutations with Fast Spectrum Reactors") shows that effective transmutation of long-lived fission products can be achieved in fast spectrum reactors without the need for isotope separation. This can be achieved by adding a yttrium deuteride moderator.

=== Reactor types ===
For instance, plutonium can be reprocessed into mixed oxide fuels and transmuted in standard reactors. However, this is limited by the accumulation of plutonium-240 in spent MOX fuel, which is neither particularly fertile (transmutation to fissile plutonium-241 does occur, but at lower rates than production of more plutonium-240 from neutron capture by plutonium-239) nor fissile with thermal neutrons. Even countries like France which practice nuclear reprocessing extensively, usually do not reuse the plutonium content of used MOX-fuel. The heavier elements could be transmuted in fast reactors, but probably more effectively in a subcritical reactor which is sometimes known as an energy amplifier and which was devised by Carlo Rubbia. Fusion neutron sources have also been proposed as well suited.

=== Fuel types ===
There are several fuels that can incorporate plutonium in their initial composition at their beginning of cycle and have a smaller amount of this element at the end of cycle. During the cycle, plutonium can be burnt in a power reactor, generating electricity. This process is not only interesting from a power generation standpoint, but also due to its capability of consuming the surplus weapons grade plutonium from the weapons program and plutonium resulting of reprocessing used nuclear fuel.

Mixed oxide fuel is one of these. Its blend of oxides of plutonium and uranium constitutes an alternative to the low enriched uranium fuel predominantly used in light water reactors. Since uranium is present in mixed oxide, although plutonium will be burnt, second generation plutonium will be produced through the radiative capture of uranium-238 and the two subsequent beta minus decays.

Fuels with plutonium and thorium are also an option. In these, the neutrons released in the fission of plutonium are captured by thorium-232. After this radiative capture, thorium-232 becomes thorium-233, which undergoes two beta minus decays resulting in the production of the fissile isotope uranium-233. The radiative capture cross section for thorium-232 is more than three times that of uranium-238, yielding a higher conversion to fissile fuel than that from uranium-238. Due to the absence of uranium in the fuel, there is no second generation plutonium produced, and the amount of plutonium burnt will be higher than in mixed oxide fuels. However, uranium-233, which is fissile, will be present in the used nuclear fuel. Weapons-grade and reactor-grade plutonium can be used in plutonium–thorium fuels, with weapons-grade plutonium being the one that shows a bigger reduction in the amount of plutonium-239.

=== Long-lived fission products ===
Long-lived fission products
Nuclide	t_{1/2}	Yield	Q (Note: Decay energy is split among β, neutrino, and γ if any.)	βγ
	(Ma)	(%) (Note: Per 65 thermal neutron fissions of ^{235}U and 35 of ^{239}Pu.)	(keV)	
^{99}Tc	0.211	6.1385	294	β
^{126}Sn	0.23	0.1084	4050 (Note: Has decay energy 380 keV, but its decay product ^{126}Sb has decay energy 3.67 MeV.)	βγ
^{79}Se	0.33	0.0447	151	β
^{135}Cs	1.33	6.9110 (Note: Lower in thermal reactors because ^{135}Xe, its predecessor, readily absorbs neutrons.)	269	β
^{93}Zr	1.61	5.4575	91	βγ
^{107}Pd	6.5	1.2499	33	β
^{129}I	16.1	0.8410	194	βγ

Some radioactive fission products can be converted into shorter-lived radioisotopes by transmutation. Transmutation of all fission products with half-life greater than one year is studied in Grenoble, with varying results.

Strontium-90 and caesium-137, with half-lives of about 30 years, are the largest radiation (including heat) emitters in used nuclear fuel on a scale of decades to ~305 years (tin-121m is insignificant because of the low yield), and are not easily transmuted because they have low neutron absorption cross sections. Instead, they should simply be stored until they decay. Given that this length of storage is necessary, the fission products with shorter half-lives can also be stored until they decay.

The next longer-lived fission product is samarium-151, which has a half-life of 90 years, and is such a good neutron absorber that most of it is transmuted while the nuclear fuel is still being used; however, effectively transmuting the remaining ^{151}Sm in nuclear waste would require separation from other isotopes of samarium. Given the smaller quantities and its low-energy radioactivity, ^{151}Sm is less dangerous than ^{90}Sr and ^{137}Cs and can also be left to decay for ~970 years.

Finally, there are seven long-lived fission products. They have much longer half-lives in the range 211,000 years to 15.7 million years. Two of them, technetium-99 and iodine-129, are mobile enough in the environment to be potential dangers, are free (Technetium has no known stable isotopes) or mostly free of mixture with stable isotopes of the same element, and have neutron cross sections that are small but adequate to support transmutation. Additionally, ^{99}Tc can substitute for uranium-238 in supplying Doppler broadening for negative feedback for reactor stability. Most studies of proposed transmutation schemes have assumed ^{99}Tc, ^{129}I, and transuranium elements as the targets for transmutation, with other fission products, activation products, and possibly reprocessed uranium remaining as waste. Technetium-99 is also produced as a waste product in nuclear medicine from Technetium-99m, a nuclear isomer that decays to its ground state which has no further use. Due to the decay product of ^{100}Tc (the result of ^{99}Tc capturing a neutron) decaying with a relatively short half-life to a stable isotope of ruthenium, a precious metal, there might also be some economic incentive to transmutation, if costs can be brought low enough.

Of the remaining five long-lived fission products, selenium-79, tin-126 and palladium-107 are produced only in small quantities (at least in today's thermal neutron, ^{235}U-burning light water reactors) and the last two should be relatively inert. The other two, zirconium-93 and caesium-135, are produced in larger quantities, but also not highly mobile in the environment. They are also mixed with larger quantities of other isotopes of the same element. Zirconium is used as cladding in fuel rods due to being virtually "transparent" to neutrons, but a small amount of ^{93}Zr is produced by neutron absorption from the regular zircalloy without much ill effect. Whether ^{93}Zr could be reused for new cladding material has not been subject of much study thus far.

== See also ==
- Accelerator-driven subcritical reactor
- Neutron activation
- Nuclear power
- List of nuclear waste treatment technologies
- Spallation
- Synthesis of precious metals
- Fertile material
- Nuclear fuel cycle
