= Louis Slotin =

Canadian physicist and chemist (1910–1946)

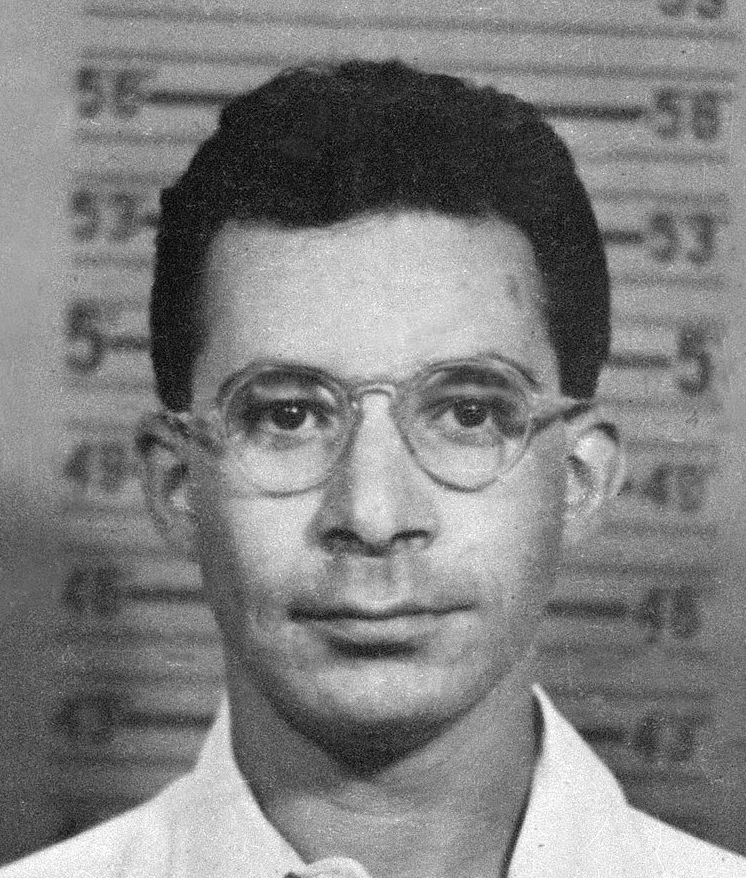
- Slotin's Los Alamos badge photo
- Born: Louis Alexander Slotin; 1 December 1910; Winnipeg, Manitoba, Canada
- Died: 30 May 1946 (aged 35); Los Alamos National Laboratory, New Mexico, U.S.
- Cause of death: Acute radiation syndrome
- Resting place: Shaarey Zedek Cemetery
- Education: University of Manitoba (BSc, MSc); King's College London (PhD)
- Occupations: Physicist and chemist
- Known for: Criticality tests on plutonium and nuclear weapons assembling, the dollar unit of reactivity

Louis Alexander Slotin (/ˈsloʊtɪn/ SLOHT-in; 1 December 1910 – 30 May 1946) was a Canadian physicist and chemist who took part in the Manhattan Project. Born and raised in the North End of Winnipeg, Manitoba, Slotin earned both his Bachelor of Science and Master of Science degrees from the University of Manitoba, and his doctorate in physical chemistry at King's College London in 1936. Afterwards, he joined the University of Chicago as a research associate to help design a cyclotron.

In 1942, Slotin was invited to participate in the Manhattan Project, and subsequently performed experiments with uranium and plutonium cores to determine their critical mass values. After World War II, he continued his research at Los Alamos National Laboratory in New Mexico. On 21 May 1946, he accidentally triggered a supercritical nuclear chain reaction, which released a burst of hard radiation. He was rushed to the hospital and died nine days later on 30 May. Slotin had become the second fatal victim of a criticality accident in history, following Harry Daghlian, who had died of a related accident with the same plutonium "demon core" the previous year.

Slotin was hailed as a hero by the United States government for reacting quickly enough to prevent the deaths of his colleagues. However, Slotin had ignored safety protocols for the experiment, causing the accident. Therefore, some physicists stated that Slotin's behavior preceding the accident was reckless and that his death was preventable. The accident and its aftermath have been dramatized in several fictional and non-fictional accounts.

== Early life ==
Louis Slotin was the first of three children born to Israel and Sonia Slotin, Yiddish-speaking Jewish refugees who had fled the pogroms of Russia to Winnipeg, Manitoba. He grew up in the North End neighborhood of Winnipeg, an area with a large concentration of Eastern European immigrants. From his early days at Machray Elementary School through his teenage years at St. John's High School, Slotin was academically exceptional. His younger brother, Sam, later remarked that his brother "had an extreme intensity that enabled him to study long hours."

At age 16, Slotin entered the University of Manitoba to pursue a degree in science. During his undergraduate years, he received a University Gold Medal in both physics and chemistry. Slotin received a B.Sc. degree in geology from the university in 1932 and a M.Sc. degree in 1933. With the assistance of one of his mentors, he obtained a fellowship to study at King's College London under the supervision of Arthur John Allmand, the chair of the chemistry department, who specialized in the field of applied electrochemistry and photochemistry.

=== King's College London ===
While at King's College London, Slotin distinguished himself as an amateur boxer by winning the college's amateur bantamweight boxing championship. Later, he gave the impression that he had fought for the Spanish Republic and trained to fly a fighter with the Royal Air Force. Author Robert Jungk recounted in his book Brighter than a Thousand Suns: A Personal History of the Atomic Scientists, an early history of the Manhattan Project, that Slotin "had volunteered for service in the Spanish Civil War, more for the sake of the thrill of it than on political grounds. He had often been in extreme danger as an anti-aircraft gunner." During an interview years later, Sam stated that his brother had gone "on a walking tour in Spain" and he "did not take part in the war" as previously thought.

Slotin earned a Ph.D. in physical chemistry from King's College London in 1936. He won a prize for his thesis entitled "An Investigation into the Intermediate Formation of Unstable Molecules During some Chemical Reactions." Afterwards, he spent six months working as a special investigator for Dublin's Great Southern Railways, testing the Drumm nickel–zinc rechargeable batteries used on the Dublin–Bray line.

== Career ==
=== University of Chicago ===
In 1937, after he unsuccessfully applied for a job with Canada's National Research Council, the University of Chicago accepted Slotin as a research associate. There, he gained his first experience with nuclear chemistry, helping to build the first cyclotron in the midwestern United States. The job paid poorly and Slotin's father had to support him for two years. From 1939 to 1940, Slotin collaborated with Earl Evans, the head of the university's biochemistry department, to produce radiocarbon (carbon-14 and carbon-11) from the cyclotron. While working together, the two men also used carbon‑11 to demonstrate that plant cells had the capacity to use carbon dioxide for carbohydrate synthesis, through carbon fixation.

Slotin might have been present at the start-up of Enrico Fermi's "Chicago Pile-1", the first nuclear reactor, on 2 December 1942; the accounts of the event do not agree on this point. (Note: A 1962 University of Chicago document says that Slotin "was present on 2 December 1942, when the group of 'Met Lab' [Metallurgical Laboratory] scientists working under the late Enrico Fermi achieved man's first self-sustaining nuclear chain reaction in a pile of graphite and uranium under the West Stands of Stagg Field." Slotin's colleague, Henry W. Newson, recollected that he and Slotin were not present during the scientists' experimentation.) During this time, he also contributed to several papers in the field of radiobiology. His expertise on the subject garnered the attention of the United States government, and as a result he was invited to join the Manhattan Project, an effort to develop an atomic bomb. Slotin worked on the production of plutonium under future Nobel laureate Eugene Wigner at the university and later at the Oak Ridge National Laboratory in Oak Ridge, Tennessee. He moved to the Los Alamos National Laboratory in New Mexico in December 1944 to work in the bomb physics group of Robert Bacher.

== Work at Los Alamos ==
At Los Alamos, Slotin's duties consisted of dangerous criticality testing, first with uranium in Otto Robert Frisch's experiments, and later with plutonium cores. Criticality testing involved bringing masses of fissile materials to near-critical levels to establish their critical mass values. Scientists referred to this flirting with the possibility of a nuclear chain reaction as "tickling the dragon's tail", based on a remark by physicist Richard Feynman comparing the experiments to "tickling the tail of a sleeping dragon". On 16 July 1945, Slotin assembled the core for Trinity, the first detonated atomic device, and became known as the "chief armorer of the United States" for his expertise in assembling nuclear weapons. Slotin received two small circular lead and silver commemorative pins for his work on the project.

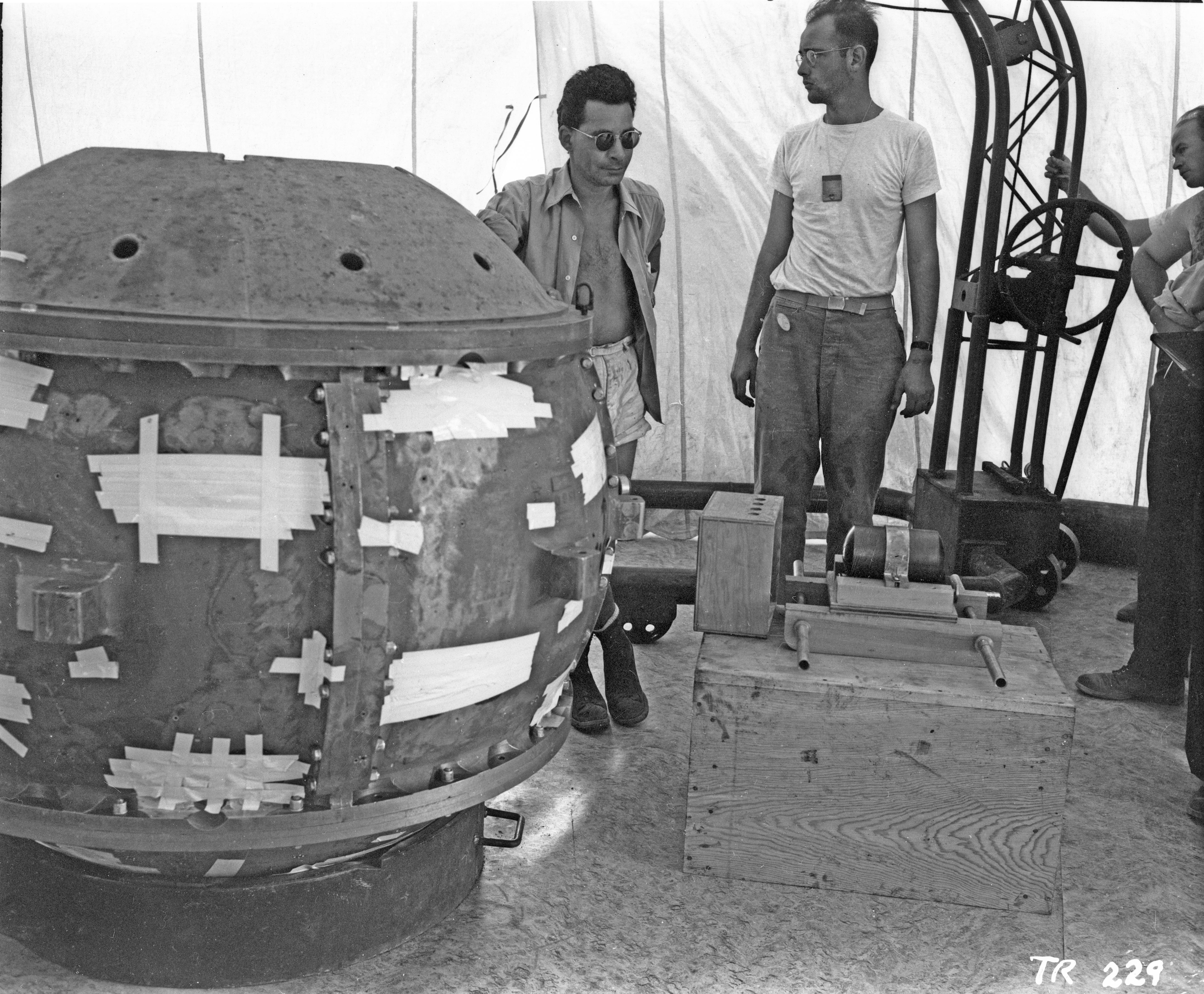
Louis Slotin (left) with the Gadget bomb during the Trinity test

In the winter of 1945–1946, Slotin shocked some of his colleagues with a bold action by repairing an instrument 6 feet (1.8 m) under water inside the Clinton Pile while it was operating, rather than wait an extra day for the reactor to be shut down. He did not wear his dosimetry badge, but his dose was estimated to be at least 100 roentgen. A dose of 1 Gy (≈100 roentgen) can cause nausea and vomiting in 10% of cases, but is generally survivable.

=== Harry Daghlian's death ===
On 21 August 1945, laboratory assistant Harry Daghlian, one of Slotin's close colleagues, was performing a criticality experiment when he accidentally dropped a heavy tungsten carbide brick onto a 6.2-kilogram (14 lb) plutonium–gallium alloy bomb core, later nicknamed the "demon core", which would later also kill Slotin. The 24-year-old Daghlian was irradiated with a large dose of neutron radiation. Later estimates suggested that this dose might not have been fatal on its own, but he then received additional delayed gamma radiation and beta burns while disassembling his experiment. He quickly collapsed with acute radiation poisoning and died 25 days later in the Los Alamos base hospital.

=== Planned return to teaching ===
After World War II, Slotin expressed growing disdain for his personal involvement in the project. He remarked, "I have become involved in the Navy tests, much to my disgust." Unfortunately for Slotin, his participation at Los Alamos was still required because, as he said, "I am one of the few people left here who are experienced bomb putter-togetherers." He looked forward to resuming teaching and research into biophysics and radiobiology at the University of Chicago. He began training a replacement, Alvin C. Graves, to take over his role at Los Alamos.

=== Criticality accident ===
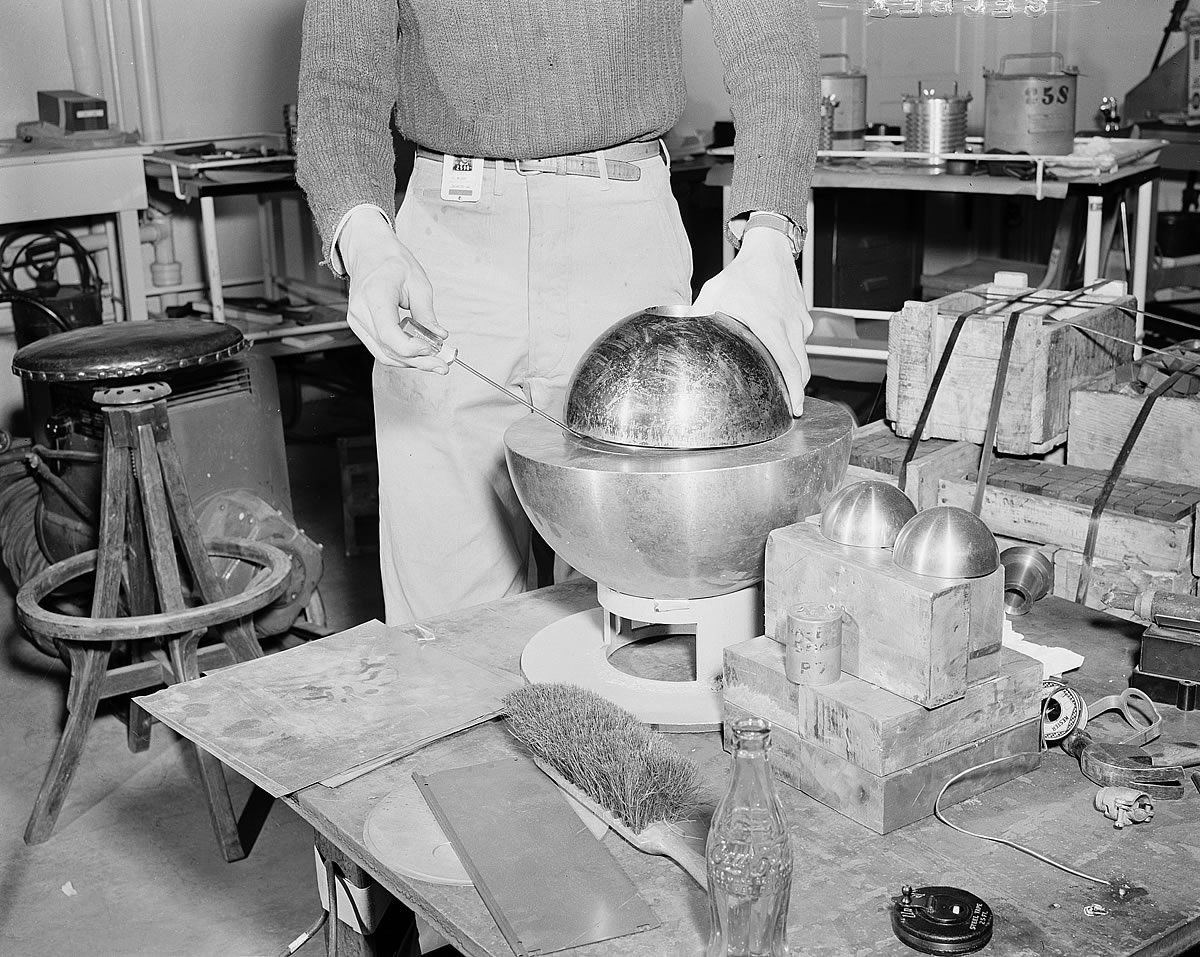
A re-creation of the Slotin incident. The inside hemisphere with the thumb-hole next to the demonstrator's hand is beryllium (replacing the uranium tamper of the same size in a Fat Man bomb). There is an external larger metal sphere of aluminium under it (replacing the pusher sphere in this bomb's design). The plutonium "demon core" was inside the spheres at the time of the accident and is not visible, but its dimensions are comparable with the two small half-spheres shown resting nearby.

On 21 May 1946, with seven colleagues watching, Slotin performed an experiment that involved the creation of one of the first steps of a fission reaction by placing two half-spheres of beryllium (a neutron reflector) around a 3.5-inch-diameter (89 mm) plutonium core. The experiment used the same 6.2-kilogram (13.7 lb) plutonium core that had irradiated Daghlian, later called the "demon core" for its role in the two accidents. Slotin grasped the upper 228.6 mm (9-inch) beryllium hemisphere with his left hand through a thumb hole at the top while he maintained the separation of the half-spheres using the blade of a screwdriver. The standard protocol was to use shims between the halves, as allowing them to close completely could result in the instantaneous formation of a critical mass and a lethal power excursion.

By Slotin's own unapproved protocol, the shims were not used. The top half of the reflector was resting directly on the bottom half at one point, while 180 degrees from this point a gap was maintained by the blade of a flat-tipped screwdriver in Slotin's hand. The size of the gap between the reflectors was changed by twisting the screwdriver. Slotin, who was given to bravado, became the local expert, performing the test on almost a dozen occasions, often in his trademark blue jeans and cowboy boots in front of a roomful of observers. Enrico Fermi reportedly told Slotin and others they would be "dead within a year" if they continued performing the test in that manner. Scientists referred to this flirtation with a nuclear chain reaction as "tickling the dragon's tail", based on a remark by physicist Richard Feynman.

At 3:20 p.m., the screwdriver slipped and the upper beryllium hemisphere fell, causing a "prompt critical" reaction and a burst of hard radiation. Those present saw the blue glow of ionized air and felt a wave of heat. Slotin experienced a sour taste in his mouth and an intense burning sensation in his left hand. He jerked his left hand upward, lifting the upper beryllium hemisphere, ending the reaction, and dropped it to the floor. However, he had already been exposed to a lethal dose of neutron radiation.

At the time of the accident, dosimetry badges were in a locked box about 100 feet (30 m) from where the reaction occurred. Realizing that no one in the room had their film badges on, "immediately after the accident Dr. Slotin asked Dr. Raemer E. Schreiber to have the badges taken from the lead box and placed on the critical assembly". This peculiar suggestion was of no value for determining the actual doses received by the men in the room and put Schreiber at "great personal risk" of additional exposure. A report later concluded that a heavy dose of radiation may produce vertigo and can leave a person "in no condition for rational behavior." As soon as Slotin left the building he vomited, a common reaction from exposure to extremely intense ionizing radiation. Slotin's colleagues rushed him to the hospital, but the radiation damage was irreversible.

The six other men present at the accident were Alvin Cushman Graves, Samuel Allan Kline, Marion Edward Cieslicki, Dwight Smith Young, Theodore P. Perlman, and Pvt. Patrick J. Cleary. By 25 May 1946, four of these seven men had been discharged from the hospital. The United States Army physician responsible for the Los Alamos base hospital, Captain Paul Hageman, said that Slotin's, Graves's, Kline's and Young's "immediate condition is satisfactory."

==== Slotin's death ====
Despite intensive medical care and offers from numerous volunteers to donate blood for transfusions, Slotin's condition was incurable. His parents – flown from Winnipeg at Army expense – arrived four days after the incident, and by the fifth day his condition began deteriorating rapidly.

Over the next four days, Slotin suffered an "agonizing sequence of radiation-induced traumas", including severe diarrhea, reduced urine output, swollen hands, erythema, "massive blisters on his hands and forearms", intestinal paralysis and gangrene. He had internal radiation burns throughout his body, which one medical expert described as a "three-dimensional sunburn." By the seventh day, he was experiencing periods of "mental confusion." His lips turned blue and he was put in an oxygen tent. He ultimately experienced "a total disintegration of bodily functions" and slipped into a coma. Slotin died at 11 a.m. on 30 May, in the presence of his parents. He was buried in the Shaarey Zedek Cemetery in Winnipeg on 2 June 1946.

==== Other injuries and death ====
Graves, Kline and Young remained hospitalized after Slotin's death. Graves, who was standing the closest to Slotin, also developed acute radiation sickness and was hospitalized for several weeks. He survived, although he lived with chronic neurological and vision problems. Young also suffered from acute radiation syndrome, but recovered. By 28 January 1948 Graves, Kline and Perlman sought compensation for damages suffered during the incident. Graves settled his claim for $3,500 (or about $57,800 today, adjusted for inflation).

Three of the observers eventually died of conditions attributable to acute radiation exposure: Graves of a heart attack twenty years later at age 55, Cieslicki of acute myeloid leukemia nineteen years later at age 42, and Young of aplastic anemia and bacterial infection of the heart lining, twenty-nine years later, at age 83. Some of the deaths may have been a consequence of the incident. Louis Hempelman, M.D., a consultant to the Los Alamos Scientific Laboratory, believed that it is not possible to establish a causal relation between the incident and the specifics of the death from such a small sample. He stated this opinion in a publicly available report that included personal medical information which he had previously declined to release to Cieslicki during the final stages of his illness.

==== Disposal of core ====
The core involved was intended to be used in the Able detonation, during the Crossroads series of nuclear weapons testing. Slotin's experiment was said to be the last conducted before the core's detonation and was intended to be the final demonstration of its ability to go critical. After the accident, it needed time to cool. It was therefore rescheduled for the third test of the series, provisionally named Charlie, but this was cancelled due to the unexpected level of radioactivity after the underwater Baker test and the inability to decontaminate the target warships. The core was eventually melted down and its material reused in a later core.

=== Radiation dosage ===
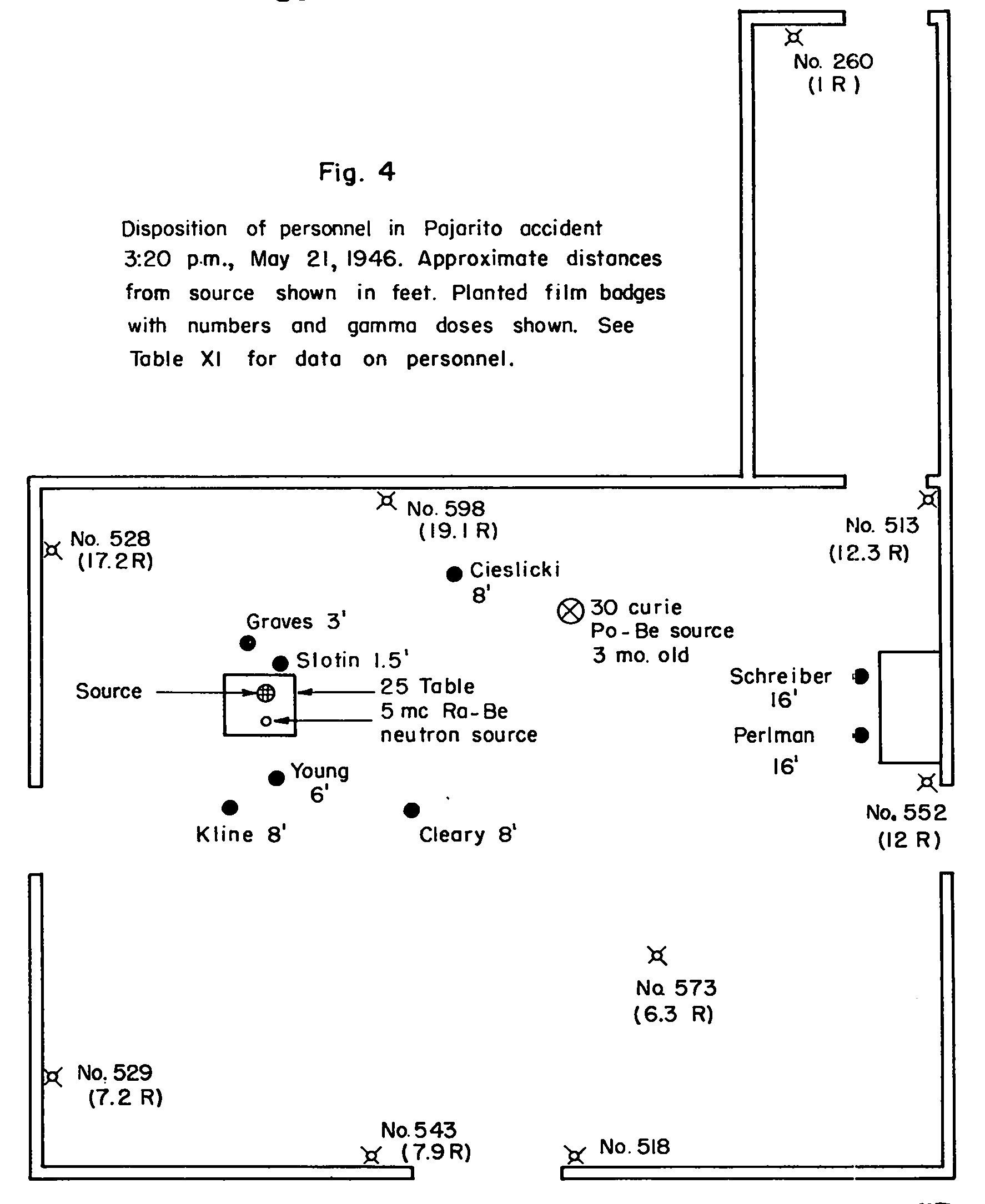
A sketch used by doctors to determine the amount of radiation to which each person in the room had been exposed during the excursion

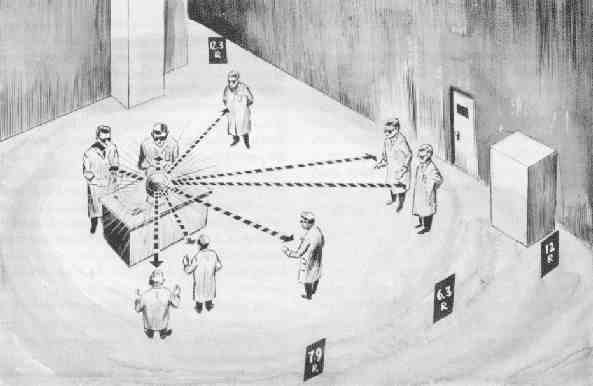
A drawing based on the above sketch.

The radiation doses received in these two accidents are not known with any accuracy. A large part of the dose was due to neutron radiation, which could not be measured by dosimetry equipment of the day. The available film badges were not worn by personnel during the accident, and badges that were supposed to be planted under tables in case of disasters like these were not found. Disaster badges hung on the walls provided some useful data about gamma radiation.

A "tentative" estimate of the doses involved was made in 1948, based on dozens of assumptions, some of which are now known to be incorrect. In the absence of personal dosimetry badges, the study authors relied on measurements of sodium activation in the victims' blood and urine samples as their primary source of data. This activation would have been caused by neutron radiation, but they converted all doses to equivalent doses of gamma or X-ray radiation. They concluded that Graves and Slotin had probably received doses equivalent to 290 rems (2.9 Sv) and 880 rems (8.8 Sv), respectively, of gamma rays. Minimum and maximum estimates varied from about 50% to 200% of these values. The authors also calculated doses equivalent to a mix of soft 80 keV X-rays and gamma rays, which they believed gave a more realistic picture of the exposure than the gamma equivalent. In this model, the equivalent X-ray doses were much higher, but would be concentrated in the tissues facing the source, whereas the gamma component penetrated the whole body. Slotin's equivalent dose was estimated to be 1930 R (roentgen) of X-ray with 114 R of gamma, while Graves' equivalent dose was estimated to be 480 R of X-ray with 110 R of gamma. Five hundred roentgen equivalent man (rem) is usually a fatal exposure for humans.

In modern times, dosimetry is done very differently. Equivalent doses would not be reported in roentgen; they would be calculated with different weighting factors, and they are not considered as relevant to acute radiation syndrome as absorbed doses. Recent documents have made various interpretations of Slotin's dose, ranging from 287 rads (2.87 Gy) to 21 sieverts (2,100 rem). Based on citations and supporting reasoning, the most reliable estimate may be a 1978 Los Alamos memo which suggested 10 Gy(n) + 1.14 Gy(γ) for Slotin and 2 Gy(n) + 1.1 Gy(γ) for Daghlian. These doses are consistent with the symptoms they experienced.

== Legacy ==
After the accident, Los Alamos ended all hands-on critical assembly work. Subsequent criticality testing of fissile cores was done with remotely controlled machines, such as the "Godiva" series, with the operator located a safe distance away to prevent harm in case of accidents.

On 14 June 1946, the associate editor of the Los Alamos Times, Thomas P. Ashlock, penned a poem entitled "Slotin – A Tribute":

May God receive you, great-souled scientist!
While you were with us, even strangers knew
The breadth and lofty stature of your mind
Twas only in the crucible of death
We saw at last your noble heart revealed.

The official story released at the time was that Slotin, by quickly removing the upper hemisphere, was a hero for ending the reaction and protecting seven other observers in the room: "Dr. Slotin's quick reaction at the immediate risk of his own life prevented a more serious development of the experiment which would certainly have resulted in the death of the seven men working with him, as well as serious injury to others in the general vicinity." This interpretation of events was endorsed at the time by Graves, who stood closest to Slotin when the accident occurred. Graves, like Slotin, had previously displayed a low concern for nuclear safety and later alleged that fallout risks were "concocted in the minds of weak malingerers." Schreiber, another witness to the accident, spoke out publicly decades later, arguing that Slotin was using improper and unsafe procedures, endangering the others in the lab along with himself. Robert B. Brode had reported hearsay to that effect back in 1946.

Slotin's accident is echoed in the 1947 film The Beginning or the End, in which a scientist assembling the bomb destined for Hiroshima dies after coming into contact with radioactive material. (Note: Jungk, Robert (1958). Brighter than a Thousand Suns. Harcourt Brace. pp. 194–196. ISBN 978-0156141505.) It was recounted in Dexter Masters' 1955 novel The Accident, a fictional account of the last few days of the life of a nuclear scientist suffering from radiation poisoning. Depictions of the criticality incident include the 1989 film Fat Man and Little Boy, in which John Cusack plays a fictional character named Michael Merriman based on Slotin, and the Louis Slotin Sonata, which premiered in 1999 at the Circle X Theatre in Los Angeles; subsequent productions include a 2001 off-Broadway production, directed by David P. Moore. William Salyers played Slotin in both these productions.

In 1948, Slotin's colleagues at Los Alamos and the University of Chicago initiated the Louis A. Slotin Memorial Fund for lectures on physics given by distinguished scientists such as Robert Oppenheimer, Luis Walter Alvarez, and Hans Bethe. The memorial fund lasted until 1962. In 2002, an asteroid discovered in 1995 was named 12423 Slotin in his honour.

=== Dollar unit of reactivity ===
According to Weinberg and Wigner, Slotin was the first to propose the name dollar for the interval of reactivity between delayed and prompt criticality; 0 is the point of self-sustaining chain reaction, a dollar is the point at which slowly released, delayed neutrons are no longer required to support chain reaction, and enters the domain called "prompt critical". Stable nuclear reactors operate between 0 and a dollar; excursions and nuclear explosives operate above a dollar. The hundredth part of a dollar is called a cent. When speaking of purely prompt critical events, some users refer to cents "over critical" as a relative unit.
