= Third Shot =

Unused American WWII atom bomb

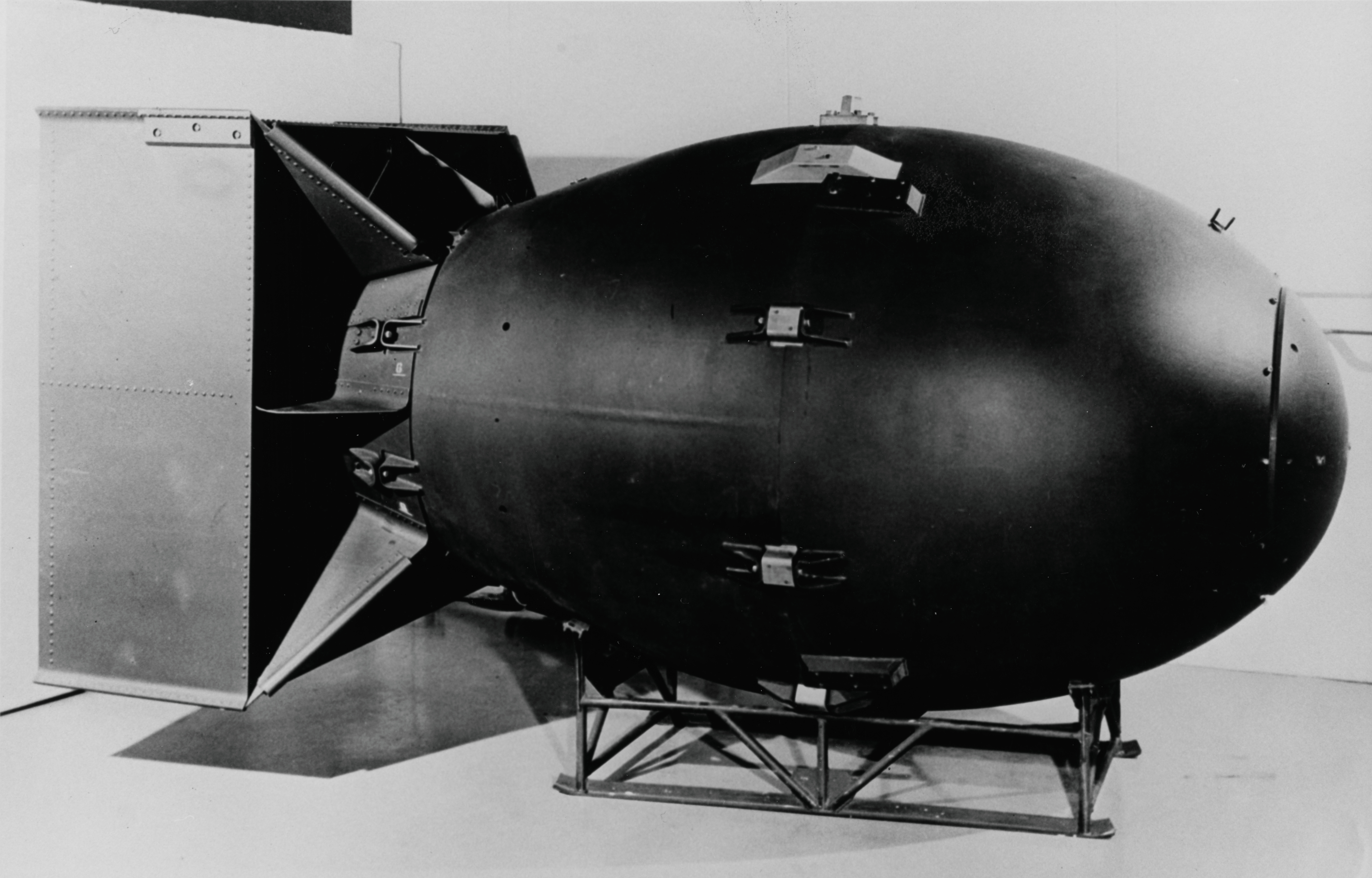
A replica of the "Fat Man" atom bomb design similar to the "Third Shot" bomb

The Third Shot was an American nuclear weapon intended for use against Japan in World War II, subsequent to the nuclear attacks on Hiroshima and Nagasaki. It was intended to be used on 19 August 1945, ten days after the bombing of Nagasaki. It was the first in a series of additional atomic bombs being assembled to strike Japan but was never used, as the country's surrender on 15 August brought the war to a close. The Third Shot was a plutonium-239-based implosion bomb of the "Fat Man" design, similar to the bomb that was dropped on Nagasaki.

== Chronology ==
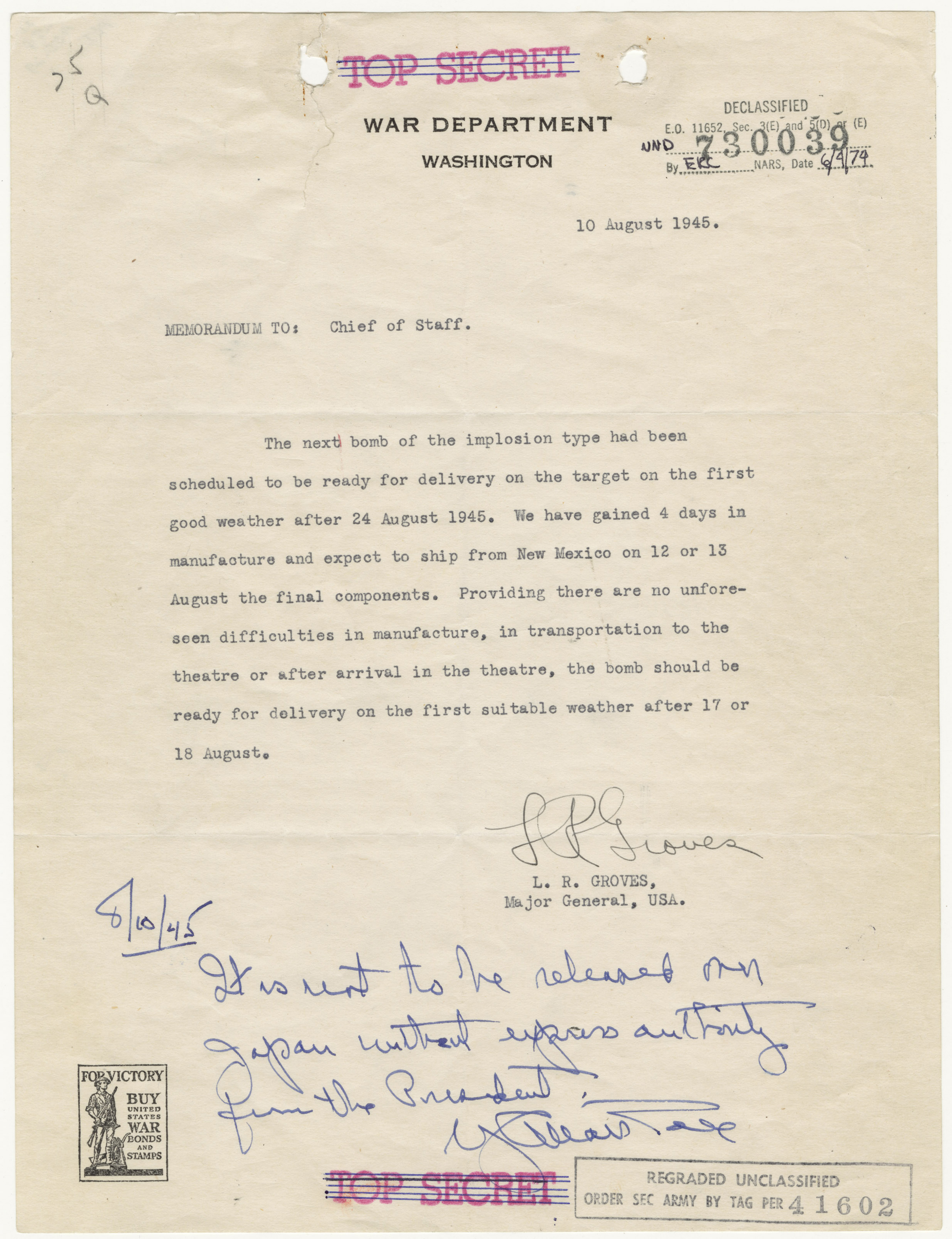
Memorandum from Leslie Groves to George C. Marshall regarding the third bomb, with Marshall's hand-written caveat that the third bomb not be used without express presidential instruction

Lieutenant General Leslie Groves expected to have another "Fat Man" atomic bomb ready for use on 19 August, with three more in September and a further three in October; On 10 August, he sent a memorandum to General George C. Marshall: "the next bomb ... should be ready for delivery on the first suitable weather after 17 or 18 August." The memo today contains hand-written comment written by Marshall: "It is not to be released over Japan without express authority from the President." At the cabinet meeting that morning, United States President Harry S. Truman discussed these actions. United States Secretary of Defense James Forrestal paraphrased Truman as saying "there will be no further dropping of the atomic bomb," while former Vice President and Secretary of Commerce Henry A. Wallace recorded in his diary that: "Truman said he had given orders to stop atomic bombing. He said the thought of wiping out another 100,000 people was too horrific. He didn't like the idea of killing, as he said, 'all those kids.'" The previous order that the target cities were to be attacked with atomic bombs "as made ready" was thus modified. There was already discussion in the War Department about conserving the bombs in production for Operation Downfall, and that the remaining cities on the target list be spared attack with atomic bombs. These cities, the presumed targets for a third bomb, were Kokura, Niigata, and Yokohama.

Two more Fat Man assemblies were readied and scheduled to leave Kirtland Field for Tinian on 11 and 14 August, and Colonel Paul Tibbets was ordered by General Curtis LeMay to return to Kirtland to collect them. At Los Alamos Laboratory, technicians worked 24 hours straight to cast another plutonium core. Although cast, it still needed to be pressed and coated, which would take until 16 August. Therefore, it could have been ready for use on 19 August. Unable to reach Marshall or Secretary of War Henry L. Stimson, Groves ordered on his own authority on 13 August that the core not be shipped.

== Aftermath ==
After the decision was made not to use the bomb, its plutonium core was kept to be used for research. The core was nicknamed "Rufus", and became known as the demon core following two successive lethal criticality accidents. The core was melted down in summer 1946 and the material recycled for use in other cores.

== See also ==
- Project Alberta
