= Flattop (critical assembly) =

Device for testing fissionable materials

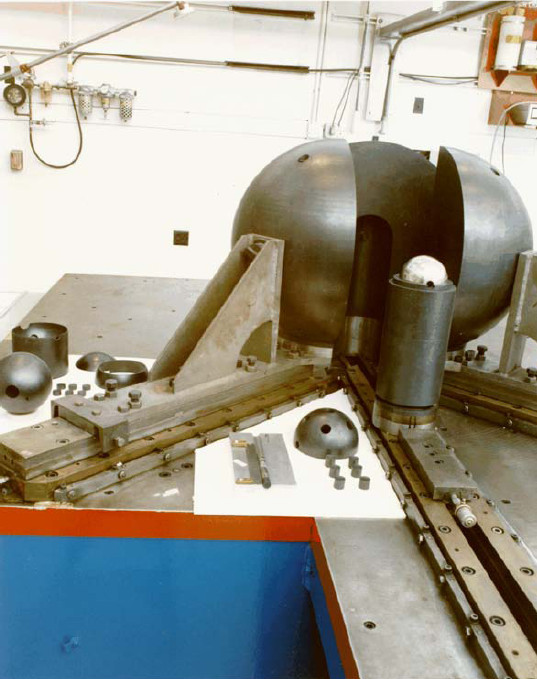
The flattop experiment, disassembled

Flattop is a benchmark critical assembly that is used to study the nuclear characteristics of uranium-233, uranium-235, and plutonium-239 in spherical geometries surrounded by a relatively thick natural uranium neutron reflector.

Flattop assemblies are used to measure neutron activation and reactivity coefficients. Since the neutron energies gradually decrease in the reflector, experiments may be run in various energy spectra based on the location in which they are placed.

== Specifications ==
Flattop is a natural-uranium-reflected, benchmarked, fixed-geometry critical assembly machine that can accommodate plutonium or uranium cores. The fast neutron spectrum is used to provide benchmarked neutronic measurements in spherical geometry with different fissile driver materials. Key missions for Flattop include fundamental reactor physics studies, sample irradiation for radiochemical research, actinide minimum critical mass studies, detector calibration, and training. The U-233 core is no longer usable because of its high gamma-ray activity.

The experiment was originally located at the Los Alamos National Laboratory Critical Experiments Facility (LACEF) located at the Los Alamos Pajarito Site, otherwise known as Technical Area 18. In 2005 the Pajarito Site started to shut down and nuclear material was moved to the National Criticality Experiments Research Center (NCERC) which is located at the Nevada National Security Site. However, NCERC continues to be operated by the Los Alamos National Laboratory. The core capabilities at NCERC include Flattop along with three other critical assemblies, Comet, Planet, and Godiva-IV and a significant inventory of nuclear material items available for experimental use. NCERC critical operations commenced in 2011 and continue to be operational today.

== Space power research ==
In 2012, Flattop was used for key demonstration of the use of nuclear power for space applications. The Demonstration Using Flattop Fission, or DUFF, test was planned by Los Alamos National Laboratory to use Flattop as a nuclear heat source. A team from the NASA Glenn Research Center in partnership with the LANL reactor design team designed, built, and tested a heat pipe and power conversion system to couple to Flattop with the end goal of demonstrating electrical power production using technology applicable to space application.

== Controls ==
Flattop consists of a hemispherical fixed reflector and two movable quarter-spheres of reflector that can close down on the central core. One movable reflector is controlled by hydraulic pressure, while the other is actuated by a motor.
