= Harry Daghlian =

American physicist (1921–1945)

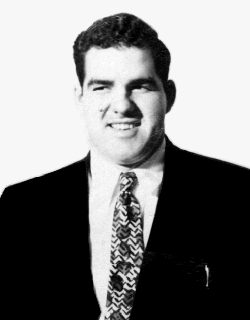
- Daghlian in c. 1944
- Born: Haroutune Krikor Daghlian Jr. May 14, 1921; Waterbury, Connecticut, U.S.
- Died: September 15, 1945 (aged 24); Los Alamos, New Mexico, U.S.
- Cause of death: Acute radiation syndrome
- Resting place: Cedar Grove Cemetery
- Education: Massachusetts Institute of Technology; Purdue University (BS)
- Occupation: Physicist

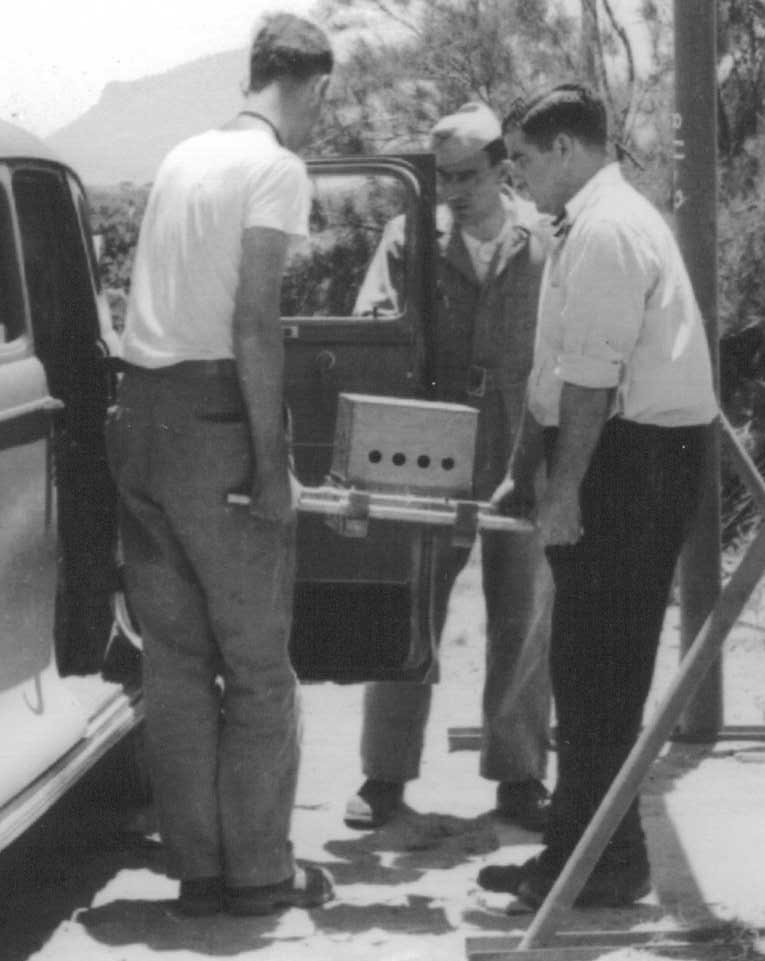
Herbert Lehr (left) and Harry Daghlian Jr. (right), loading the assembled tamper plug containing the plutonium pit and initiator into a car for transport from the McDonald ranch house to the shot tower on July 13, 1945.

Haroutune Krikor Daghlian Jr. (May 4, 1921 – September 15, 1945) was an American physicist involved in the Manhattan Project, which designed and produced the atomic bombs that were used in World War II. He accidentally irradiated himself on August 21, 1945, during a critical mass experiment at the remote Omega Site of the Los Alamos Laboratory in New Mexico and died 25 days later from the resultant radiation poisoning.

Daghlian was irradiated as a result of a criticality accident that occurred when he accidentally dropped a tungsten carbide brick onto a 6.2 kg bomb core made of plutonium–gallium alloy. This core, subsequently nicknamed the "demon core", was later involved in the death of another physicist, Louis Slotin.

== Early life and education ==
Haroutune Krikor Daghlian Jr., was born in Waterbury, Connecticut, on May 4, 1921, one of three children of Margaret Rose (née Currie) and Haroutune Krikor Daghlian. His father was an ethnic Armenian from Gaziantep, Turkey. He had a sister, Helen, and a brother, Edward. Soon after his birth the family moved across state to the coastal town of New London. He was educated at Harbor Elementary School, where he played violin in the school orchestra, and at Bulkeley High School. In 1938, at the age of 17, he entered the Massachusetts Institute of Technology, intending to study mathematics, but became interested in physics, particularly particle physics, which was then emerging as an exciting new field. This interest led him to transfer to the West Lafayette, Indiana, campus of Purdue University, from which he graduated with a Bachelor of Science degree in 1942. He then commenced work on his doctorate, assisting Marshall Holloway with the cyclotrons. In 1944, while still a graduate student, he joined Otto Frisch's Critical Assembly Group at the Los Alamos Laboratory of the Manhattan Project.

== Criticality accident and death ==
During an experiment on August 21, 1945, Daghlian was attempting to build a neutron reflector manually by stacking a set of 4.4-kilogram (9.7 lb) tungsten carbide bricks in an incremental fashion around a plutonium core. The purpose of the neutron reflector was to reduce the mass required for the plutonium core to attain criticality. He was moving the final brick over the assembly, but neutron counters alerted Daghlian to the fact that the addition of that brick would render the system supercritical. As he withdrew his hand, he inadvertently dropped the brick onto the center of the assembly. Since the assembly was nearly in the critical state, the accidental addition of that brick caused the reaction to go immediately into the prompt critical region of neutronic behavior. This resulted in a criticality accident.

Daghlian reacted immediately after dropping the brick and attempted to knock the brick off the assembly without success. He was forced to disassemble part of the tungsten-carbide pile in order to halt the reaction.

Daghlian was estimated to have received a dose of 510 rem (5.1 Sv) of neutron radiation, from a yield of 10^{16} fissions. Despite intensive medical care, he developed symptoms of severe radiation poisoning, and his sister and mother were flown out to care for him. He fell into a coma and died 25 days after the accident. He was the first known fatality caused by a criticality accident. His body was returned to New London, where he was buried at Cedar Grove Cemetery.

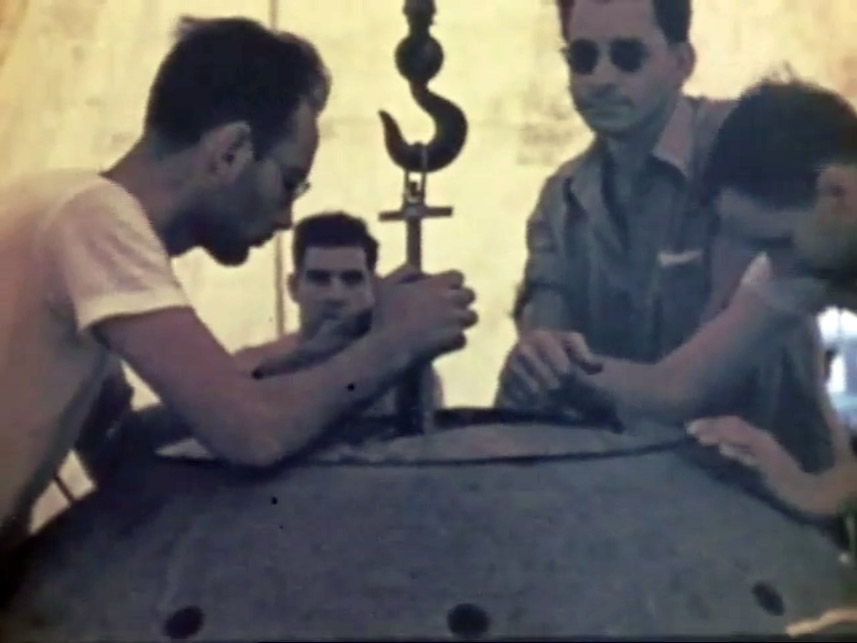
Louis Slotin (with sunglasses) and Harry Daghlian Jr. (seated middle) during the Trinity Test preparation in July 1945. Both died following supercriticality accidents.

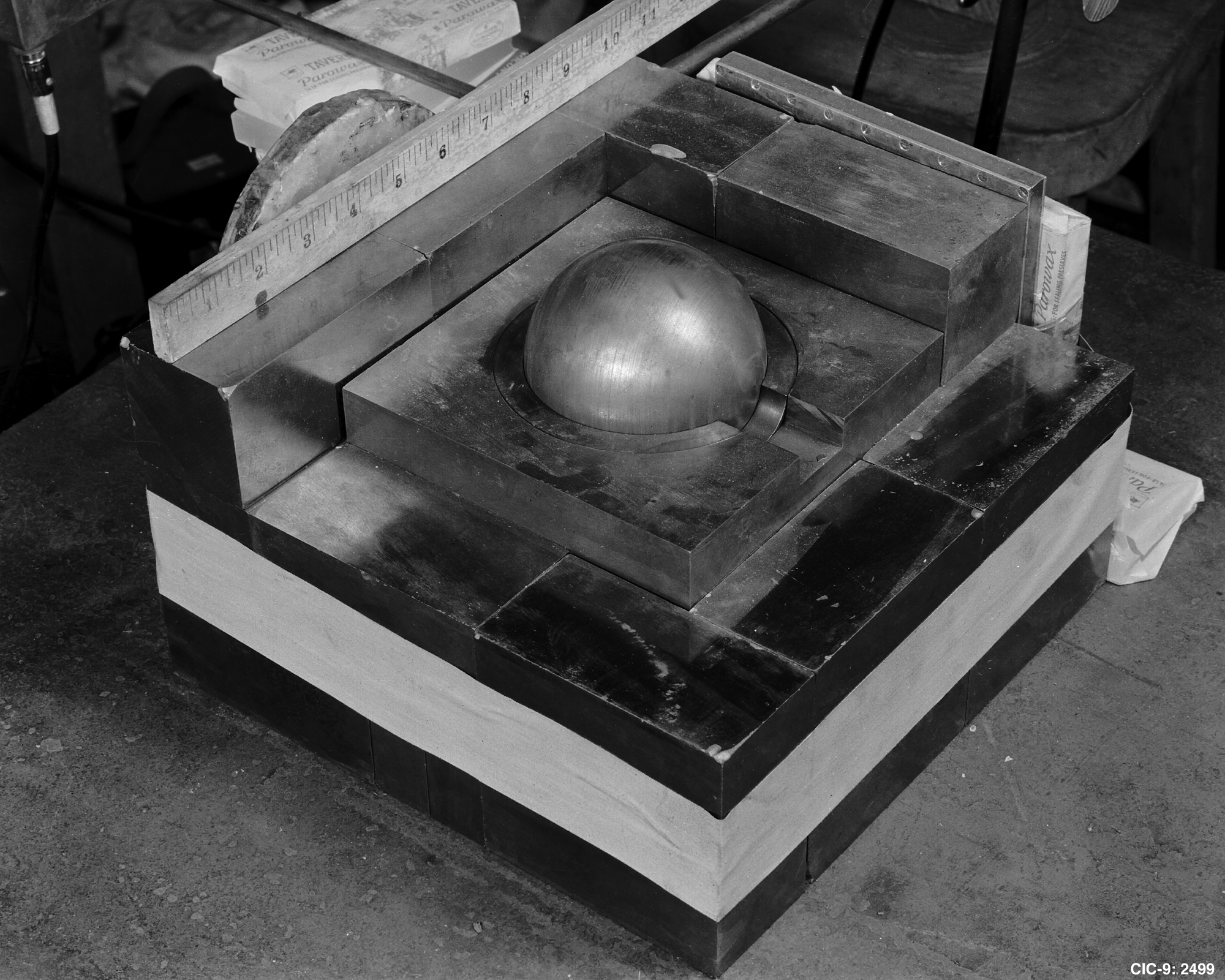
The sphere of plutonium surrounded by neutron-reflecting tungsten carbide blocks in a re-enactment of Daghlian's 1945 experiment

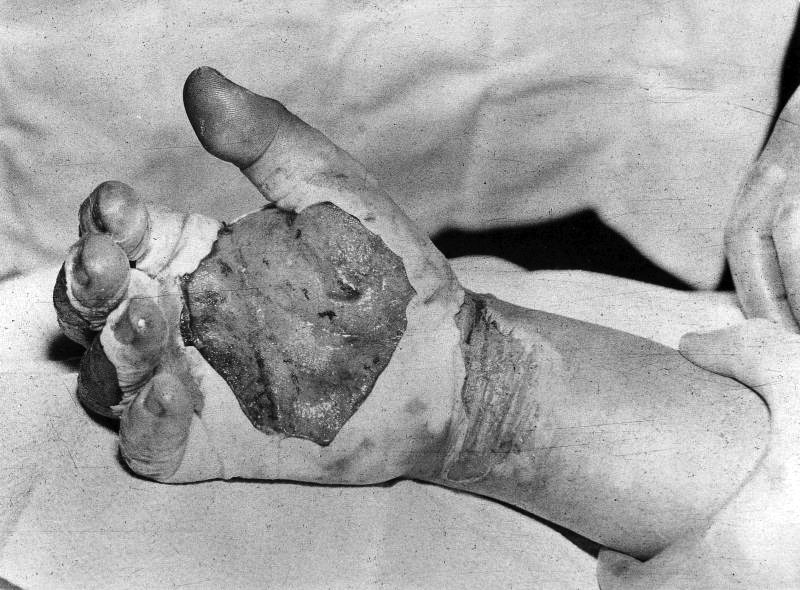
Harry K. Daghlian's blistered and burnt hand, photographed on August 30, 1945, after he received his fatal radiation dose. He died 16 days after this photo was taken.

== Legacy ==
As a result of the incident, safety regulations for the project were scrutinized and revised. A special committee was established to review any similar experiments and recommend appropriate safety procedures. This change of procedures included needing a minimum of two people involved in such an experiment, using at least two instruments monitoring neutron intensities with audible alerts, and preparing a plan for operating methods and any contingencies that might occur during similar experiments.

These changes did not prevent another criticality accident from happening at Los Alamos the following year. Louis Slotin, a colleague of Daghlian, was killed in 1946 while performing criticality tests on the same plutonium core. After these two incidents it became known as the "demon core", and all similar criticality experiments were halted until remote-controlled assembly devices were more fully developed and available.

In 2000, the city of New London erected a memorial stone and flagpole in Calkins Park to honor Daghlian. His surname is misspelled "Daghiian" on the monument. The monument bears an inscription: "though not in uniform, he died in service to his country."
