= Surge of Power =

Surge of Power may refer to:

- Surge of Power: The Stuff of Heroes – a 2004 American film
- A Surge of Power (Jen Reid) 2020 – a 2020 sculpture by Marc Quinn

== See also ==
- Power surge (disambiguation)
