= Power surge =

Power surge or Powersurge may refer to:

- Voltage spike
- Power excursion, a nuclear reactor accident
- Power Surge (comics), a 2002 DC Comics event
- Power Surge (ride), an amusement ride
- Power Surge (water ride), a former amusement water ride at Six Flags Fiesta Texas
- Powersurge (band), a Bangladeshi thrash metal band
