= Demon core =

1945–1946 sphere of plutonium

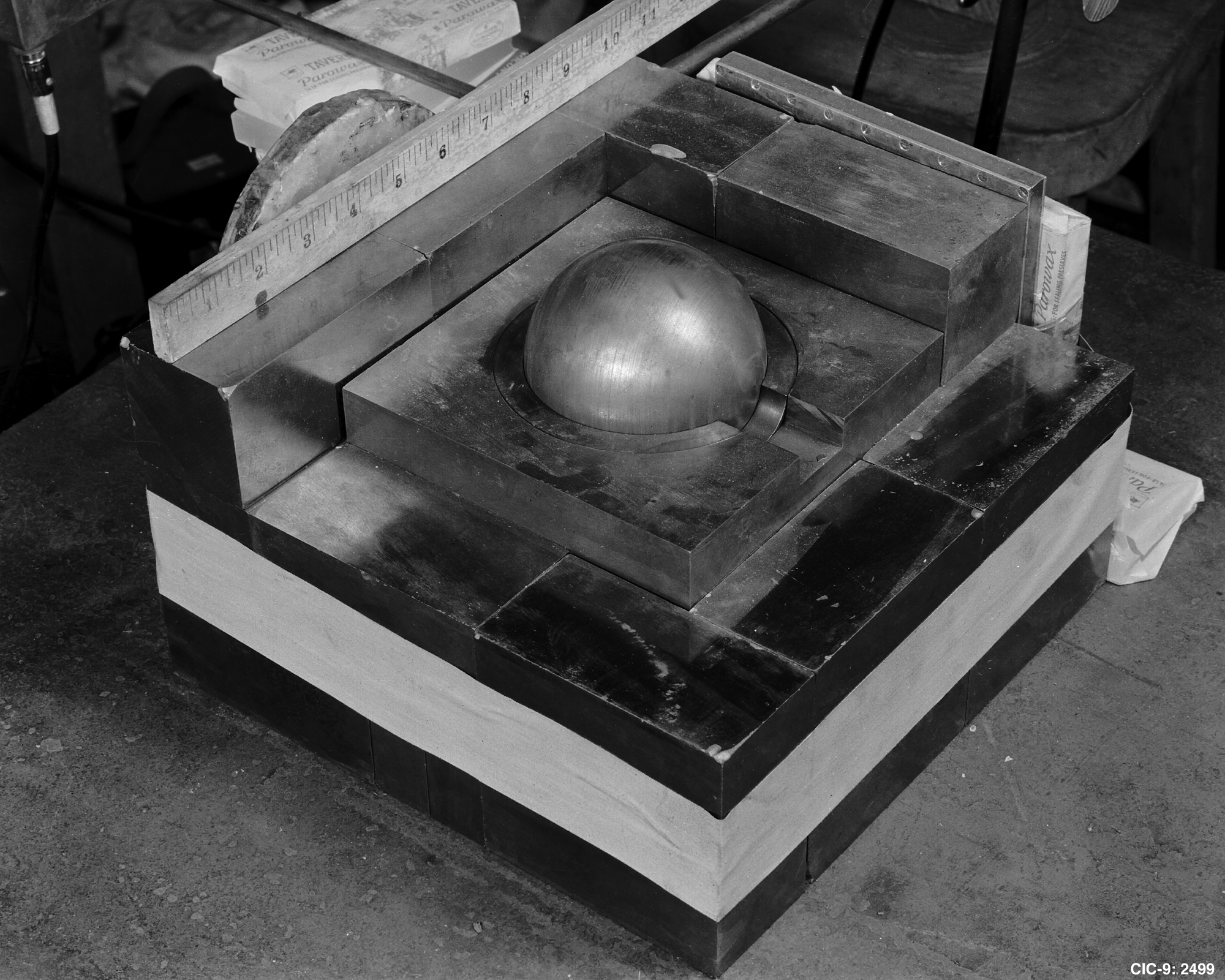
A re-creation of the experiment involved in the 1945 incident. The sphere of plutonium is surrounded by tungsten carbide blocks acting as neutron reflectors.

The demon core was a sphere of plutonium–gallium alloy that was involved in two fatal radiation accidents when scientists tested it as a fissile core of an early atomic bomb. It was manufactured in 1945 by the Manhattan Project, the U.S. nuclear weapon development effort during World War II. It was a subcritical mass that weighed 6.2 kilograms (14 lb) and was 89 millimeters (3.5 in) in diameter. The core was prepared for shipment to the Pacific Theater as part of the third nuclear weapon intended to be dropped on Japan, but when Japan surrendered, the core was retained for testing and potential later use in the case of another conflict.

The two criticality accidents occurred at the Los Alamos Laboratory in New Mexico on August 21, 1945, and May 21, 1946. In both cases, an experiment was intended to demonstrate how close the core was to criticality, using a neutron-reflective tamper (layer of dense material surrounding the fissile material). In both accidents, the core was accidentally put into a critical configuration. Physicists Harry Daghlian (in the first accident) and Louis Slotin (in the second accident) both suffered acute radiation syndrome and died shortly afterward. Others present in the laboratory were also exposed to radiation during the accidents. The core was melted down during the summer of 1946, and the material was recycled for use in other cores.

== Manufacturing and early history ==
The demon core was a solid 6.2-kilogram (14 lb) softball-sized sphere measuring 89 millimeters (3.5 in) in diameter; it was similar to the core used in the bombing of Nagasaki. It consisted of three parts made of plutonium–gallium: two hemispheres and an anti-jet ring, designed to keep neutron flux from "jetting" out of the joined surface between the hemispheres during implosion. The core of the device used in the Trinity Test at the Alamogordo Bombing and Gunnery Range in July did not have such a ring.

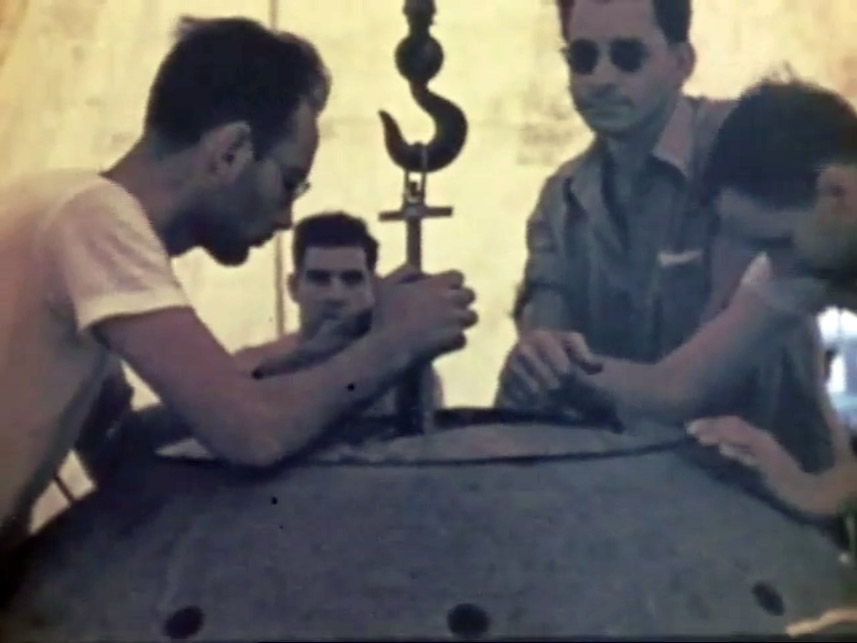
The two physicists Harry Daghlian (center left) and Louis Slotin (center right) during the Trinity Test. Both died following supercritical accidents involving the "demon core".

The refined plutonium was shipped from the Hanford Site in Washington to the Los Alamos Laboratory; an inventory document dated August 30 shows Los Alamos had expended "HS-1, 2, 3, 4; R-1" (the components of the Trinity and Nagasaki bombs) and had in its possession "HS-5, 6; R-2", finished and in the hands of quality control. Material for "HS-7, R-3" was in the Los Alamos metallurgy section and would also be ready by September 5 (it is not certain whether this date allowed for the unmentioned "HS-8"'s fabrication to complete the fourth core). The metallurgists used a plutonium–gallium alloy, which stabilized the delta (δ) phase allotrope of plutonium so it could be hot pressed into the desired spherical shape. As plutonium was found to corrode readily, the sphere was then coated with nickel.

On August 10, Major General Leslie R. Groves Jr., wrote to General of the Army George C. Marshall, the Chief of Staff of the United States Army, to inform him that:

The next bomb of the implosion type had been scheduled to be ready for delivery on the target on the first good weather after August 24th, 1945. We have gained 4 days in manufacture and expect to ship the final components from New Mexico on August 12th or 13th. Providing there are no unforeseen difficulties in manufacture, in transportation to the theatre or after arrival in the theatre, the bomb should be ready for delivery on the first suitable weather after August 17th or 18th.

Marshall added an annotation, "It is not to be released on Japan without express authority from the President", on President Harry S. Truman's orders. On August 13, the third bomb was scheduled. It was anticipated that it would be ready by August 16 to be dropped on August 19. This was pre-empted by Japan's surrender on August 15, 1945, while preparations were still being made for it to be couriered to Kirtland Field. The third core remained at Los Alamos.

== First incident ==
The core, once assembled, was designed to be at "−5 cents". In this state, there is only a small safety margin against extraneous factors that might increase reactivity, causing the core to become supercritical, and then prompt critical, a brief state of rapid energy increase. These factors are not common in the environment; they are only likely to occur under conditions such as the compression of the solid metallic core (which would eventually be the method used to explode the bomb), the addition of more nuclear material, or provision of an external reflector which would reflect outbound neutrons back into the core. The experiments conducted at Los Alamos leading to the two fatal accidents were designed to see how much neutron reflection was required to approach supercriticality, and included arranging such reflectors in a way that would guarantee that the core was indeed close to the critical point.

On August 21, 1945, the plutonium core produced a burst of neutron radiation that resulted in physicist Harry Daghlian's death. Daghlian made a mistake while performing neutron reflector experiments on the core. He was working alone; a security guard, Private Robert J. Hemmerly, was seated at a desk 10 to 12 feet (3 to 4 m) away. The core was placed within a stack of neutron-reflective tungsten carbide bricks, and the addition of each brick made the assembly closer to criticality. While attempting to stack another brick around the assembly, Daghlian accidentally dropped it onto the core and thereby caused the core to go well into supercriticality, a self-sustaining critical chain reaction. He quickly moved the brick off the assembly, but he received a fatal dose of radiation. He died 25 days later from acute radiation poisoning.

Name	Age at accident	Profession	Dose	Aftermath
Haroutune "Harry" Krikor Daghlian Jr.	24	Physicist	200 rad (2.0 Gy) neutron 110 rad (1.1 Gy) gamma	Died 25 days after the accident of acute radiation syndrome, hematopoietic focus
Private Robert J. Hemmerly	29	Special Engineer Detachment guard	8 rad (0.080 Gy) neutron 0.1 rad (0.0010 Gy) gamma	Died in 1978 (33 years after accident) of acute myelogenous leukemia at age 62

== Second incident ==
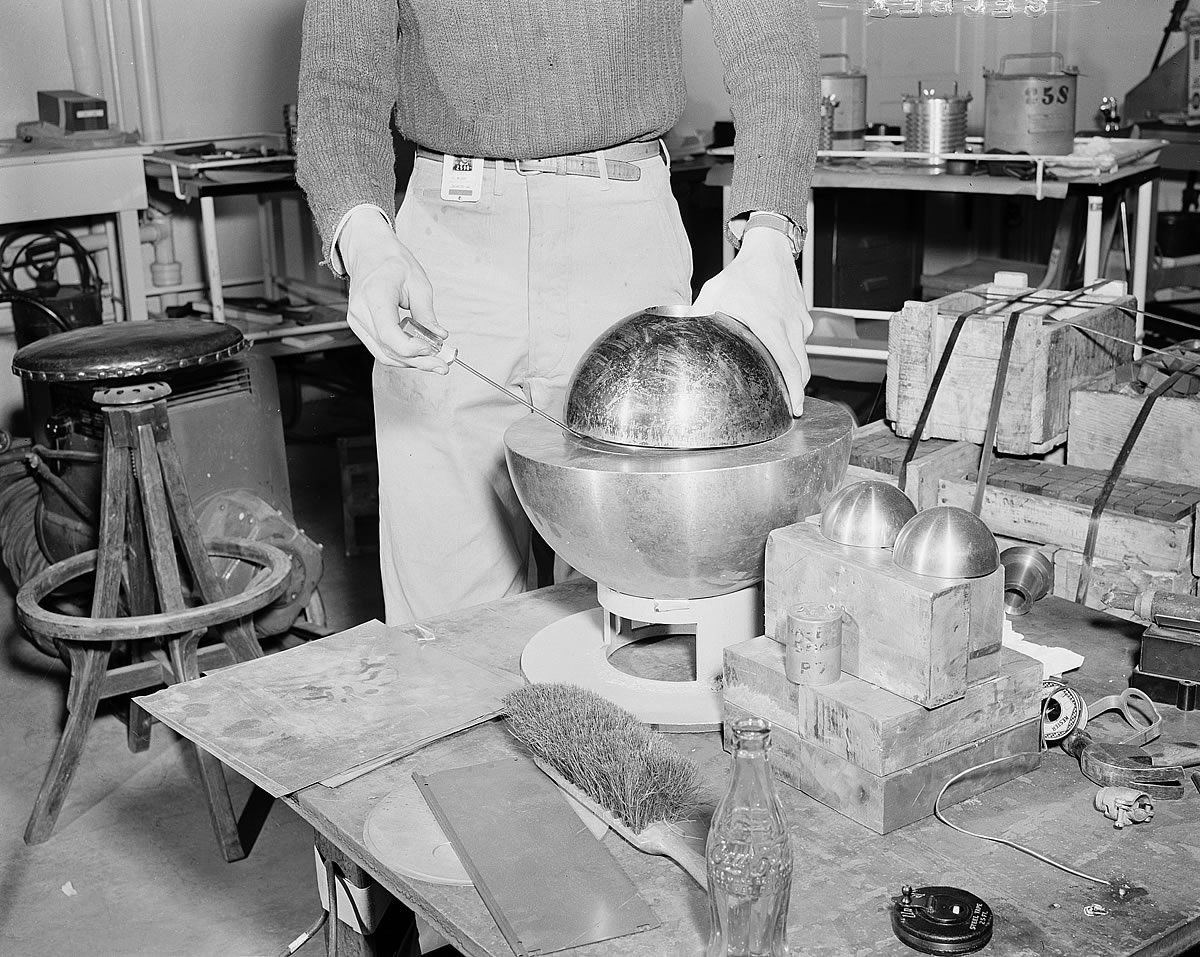
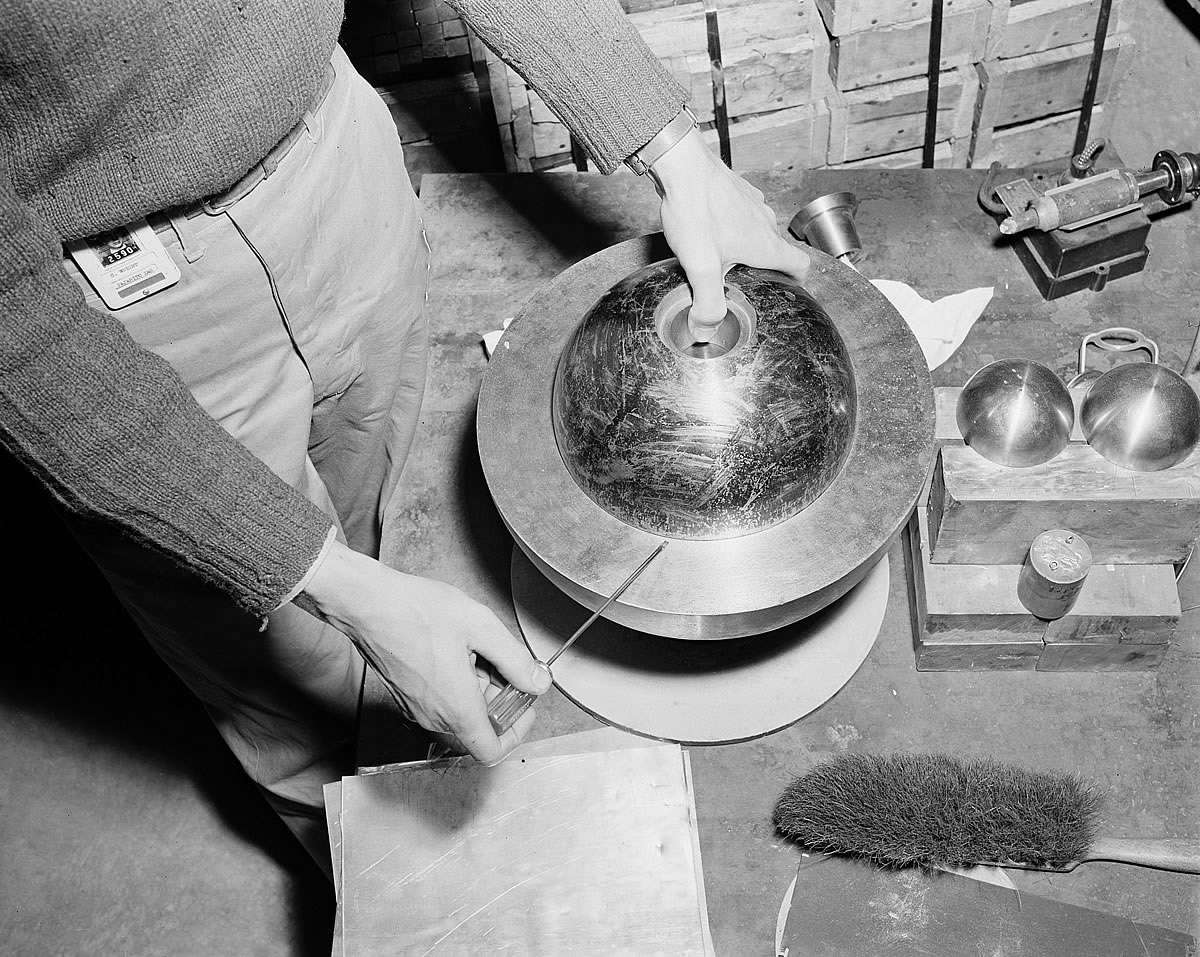
A re-creation of the 1946 experiment. The spherical beryllium shell is seen, but the core inside is not. A screwdriver holds up the top half of the shell.

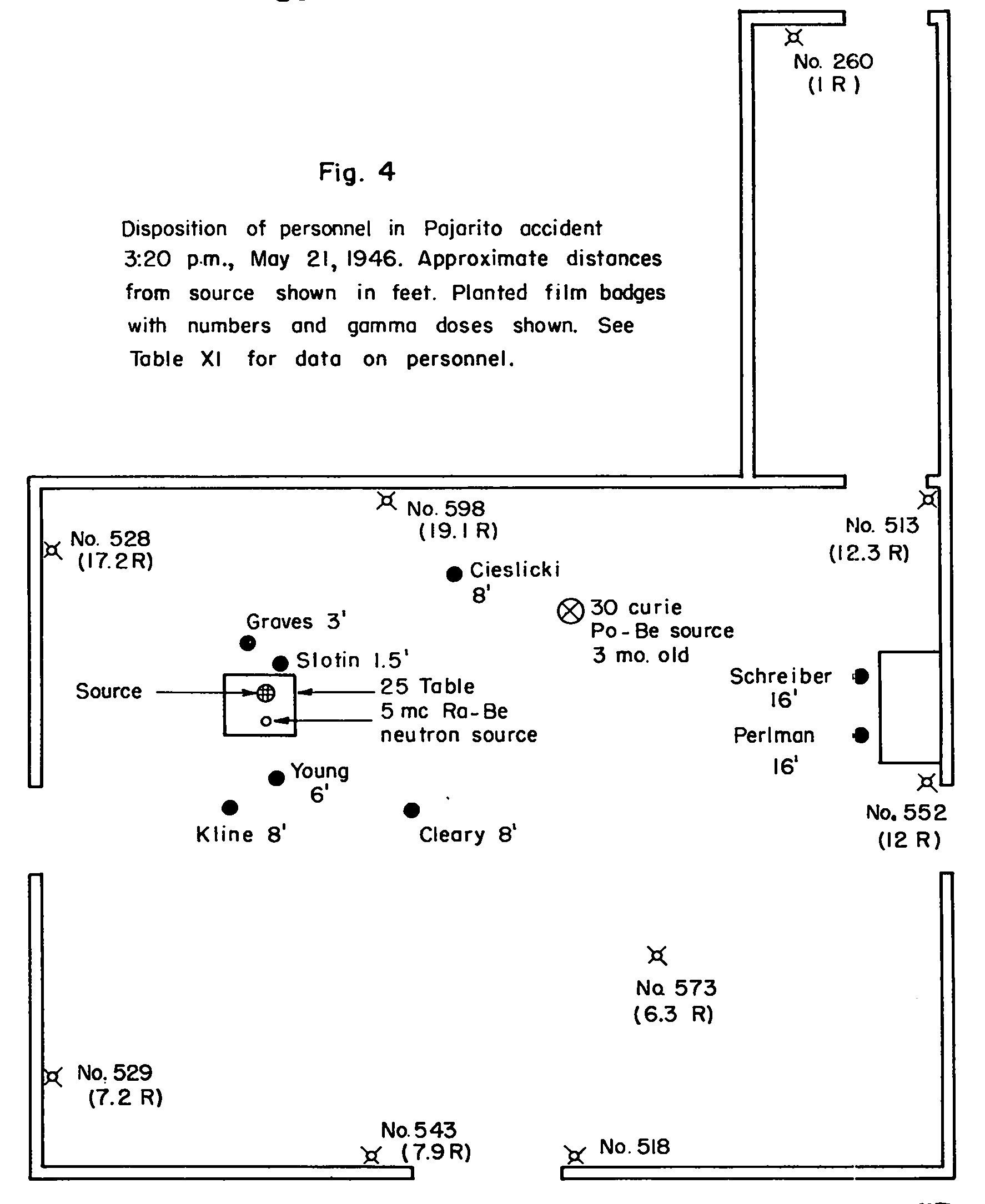
A sketch used by doctors to determine the amount of radiation to which each person in the room had been exposed during the excursion

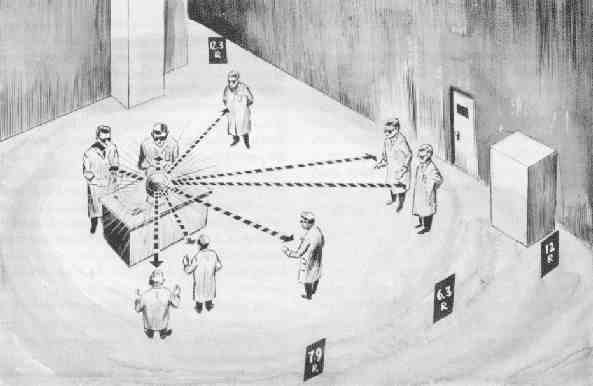
A drawing based on the above sketch

=== Background ===
On May 21, 1946, physicist Louis Slotin and seven other personnel were in a Los Alamos laboratory conducting another experiment to verify the closeness of the core to criticality by the positioning of neutron reflectors. Slotin, who was leaving Los Alamos, was showing the technique to Alvin C. Graves, who would use it in a final test before the Operation Crossroads nuclear tests scheduled a month later at Bikini Atoll. It required the operator to place two half-spherical shells of beryllium (a neutron reflector) around the core to be tested and manually lower the top reflector over the core using a thumb hole at the polar point. As the reflectors were manually moved closer and farther away from each other, neutron detectors indicated the core's neutron multiplication rate. The experimenter needed to maintain a slight separation between the reflector halves to allow enough neutrons to escape from the core in order to stay below criticality. The standard protocol was to use shims between the halves, as allowing them to close completely could result in the instantaneous formation of a critical mass and a lethal power excursion.

Using his own unapproved protocol, Slotin did not place any shims. The top half of the reflector was resting directly on the bottom half at one point, while 180 degrees from this point a gap was maintained by the blade of a flat-tipped screwdriver in Slotin's hand. The size of the gap between the reflectors was changed by twisting the screwdriver. Slotin became the local expert, performing the test on almost a dozen occasions, often in his trademark blue jeans and cowboy boots in front of a roomful of observers. Enrico Fermi reportedly told Slotin and others they would be "dead within a year" if they continued performing the test in that manner. Scientists referred to this flirtation with a nuclear chain reaction as "tickling the dragon's tail", based on a remark by physicist Richard Feynman.

On the day of the accident, Slotin's screwdriver slipped outward a fraction of an inch while he was lowering the top reflector, allowing the reflector to fall into place around the core. Instantly, there was a flash of light; the core had become supercritical, releasing an intense burst of neutron radiation. Slotin quickly twisted his wrist, flipping the top shell to the floor. There was an estimated half-second between when the sphere closed to when Slotin removed the top reflector. The reaction in the room was one of immediate, somber realization. Slotin received a lethal dose of 1,000 rad (10 Gy) neutron and 114 rad (1.14 Gy) gamma radiation in less than a second. While the position of his body over the apparatus shielded the others from much of the neutron radiation, his own exposure was irreversible. Slotin reportedly turned to his colleagues in the hushed room and famously uttered the remark, "Well, that does it." As an expert in criticality, Slotin knew he had received a lethal dose. He immediately began drawing a sketch of the room’s layout to assist medical teams in calculating the specific dosages received by each survivor, even as his own health began its rapid decline. He died nine days later from acute radiation poisoning.

Graves, the next nearest person to the core, was watching over Slotin's shoulder and was thus partially shielded by him. He received a high but non-lethal radiation dose, and was hospitalized for several weeks with severe radiation poisoning. He died 19 years later, at age 55, of heart failure. While Graves's heart failure may have been caused by exposure to radiation, it may have been caused by a hereditary condition, as his father also died of heart failure.

The second accident was reported by the Associated Press on May 26, 1946: "Four men injured through accidental exposure to radiation in the government's atomic laboratory here [Los Alamos] have been discharged from the hospital and 'immediate condition' of four others is satisfactory, the Army reported today. Dr. Norris E. Bradbury, project director, said the men were injured last Tuesday in what he described as an experiment with fissionable material."

=== Medical studies ===
Later research was performed concerning the health of the men. An early report was published in 1951. A later report was compiled for the U.S. government and submitted in 1979. A summary of its findings:

Name	Origin	Age at accident	Profession	Dose	Aftermath
Louis Alexander Slotin	Winnipeg, Manitoba, Canada	35	Physicist	1,000 rad (10 Gy) neutron 114 rad (1.14 Gy) gamma	Died 9 days after the accident of acute radiation syndrome, gastrointestinal focus.
Alvin C. Graves	Austin, Texas	36	Physicist	166 rad (1.66 Gy) neutron 26 rad (0.26 Gy) gamma	Died in 1965 (19 years after the accident) of myocardial infarction, with aggravating "compensated myxedema and cataracts", while skiing.
Samuel Allan Kline	Chicago, Illinois	26	Physics student, later patent attorney		Died in 2001 (55 years after the accident) at age 81; refused to participate with studies and was prevented from obtaining his own medical records from the incident.
Marion Edward Cieslicki	Mt. Lebanon, Pennsylvania	23	Physicist	12 rad (0.12 Gy) neutron 4 rad (0.040 Gy) gamma	Died of acute myelocytic leukemia in 1965 (19 years after the accident).
Dwight Smith Young	Chicago, Illinois	54	Photographer	51 rad (0.51 Gy) neutron 11 rad (0.11 Gy) gamma	Died of aplastic anemia and bacterial endocarditis in 1975 (29 years after the accident) at age 83.
Raemer Edgar Schreiber	McMinnville, Oregon	36	Physicist	9 rad (0.090 Gy) neutron 3 rad (0.030 Gy) gamma	Died of natural causes in 1998 (52 years after the accident), at age 88.
Theodore Perlman	New Orleans, Louisiana	23	Engineer	7 rad (0.070 Gy) neutron 2 rad (0.020 Gy) gamma	"Alive and in good health and spirits" as of 1978; most likely died in June 1988 (42 years after the accident), in Livermore, California.
Private Patrick Joseph Cleary	New York City, New York	21	Security guard	33 rad (0.33 Gy) neutron 9 rad (0.090 Gy) gamma	Sergeant 1st Class Cleary was killed in action on September 3, 1950 (4 years after the accident), while serving with the 8th Cavalry Regiment, US Army in the Korean War.

Two machinists, Paul Long and another, unidentified, in another part of the building, 20–25 ft (6–7.5 m) away, were not treated.

After these incidents, the core, originally known as "Rufus", was referred to as the "demon core". Hands-on criticality experiments were stopped, and remote-control machines and TV cameras were designed by Schreiber, one of the survivors, to perform such experiments with all personnel at a quarter-mile distance.

== Planned uses and fate of the core ==
The demon core was intended for use in the Operation Crossroads nuclear tests, but after the second criticality accident, time was needed for its radioactivity to decrease and for it to be re-evaluated for the effects of the fission products it held, some of which were very neutron poisonous to the desired level of fission. The next two cores were shipped for use in Able and Baker, and the demon core was scheduled to be shipped later for the third test of the series, provisionally named Charlie, but that test was canceled because of the unexpected level of radioactivity resulting from the underwater Baker test and the inability to decontaminate the target warships. The core was melted down during the summer of 1946, and the material was recycled for use in other cores.

== In popular culture ==
The "demon core" is often portrayed in popular culture as an example of a scientific cautionary tale.

While not explicitly featured in the 2023 Christopher Nolan film Oppenheimer, the story of the core and Slotin is frequently cited in popular discussions surrounding the film.

Numerous online science communication channels and documentaries discuss the core, often focusing on the dramatic "blue glow" and the reckless nature of the "tickling the dragon's tail" experiments. Starting around 2018, the "demon core" has often been the subject of online memes.

== See also ==
- Cecil Kelley criticality accident
