= Godiva device =

Pulsed nuclear reactor radiation source

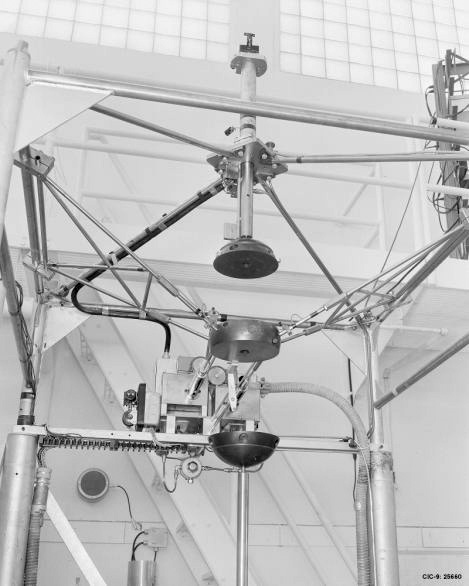
Experimenters produced bursts of gamma rays and neutrons by assembling Godiva I's three parts and dropping a burst rod through the center. This image shows it in the safe, scrammed, state.

The Lady Godiva device was an unshielded pulsed nuclear reactor originally situated at the Los Alamos National Laboratory (LANL), near Santa Fe, New Mexico. It was one of a number of criticality devices within Technical Area 18 (TA-18). Specifically, it was used to produce bursts of neutrons and gamma rays for irradiating test samples, and inspired development of Godiva-like reactors. (Note: according to the physicist Otto Frisch, "We were building an unusual assembly, with no reflecting material around it; just the reacting compound of uranium-235 ... For obvious reasons we called it the Lady Godiva assembly." (Frisch 1980, p. 161))

The radiation source within the Godiva device was a fissile metallic mass (usually highly enriched ^{235}U), about 11.8 inches (30 cm) in diameter. This was located at the top of a 6.5-foot (2 m) high metal tower. The burst of radiation was produced when a piston of fissile material was quickly inserted into and extracted from a cavity within the larger fissile mass. During the time these two masses were combined, they formed a critical mass and a nuclear chain reaction was briefly sustained.

Godiva's design was inspired by a self terminating property discovered when incorrectly experimenting with the Jemima device in 1952. Jemima operated by remotely lifting one stack of enriched uranium-235 disks up towards another, fixed, stack. On 18 April 1952, due to a miscalculation, Jemima was assembled with too many disks; this caused an excursion of 1.5 × 10^{16} fissions—an automatic scram—but no damage.

On 3 February 1954 and 12 February 1957, accidental criticality excursions occurred, causing damage to the device but only insignificant exposures to personnel. This original Godiva device, known as Lady Godiva, was irreparable after the second accident and was replaced by the Godiva II.

== Godiva II ==
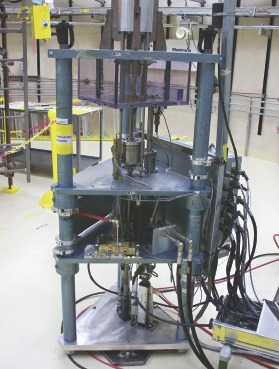
A cylindrical wire cage encloses the spherical uranium mass at the top of this image of Godiva II.

Godiva II was constructed inside a concrete building with 20-inch-thick (51 cm) walls and 8-inch-thick (20 cm) roof in a canyon a quarter-mile (400 m) away from the control room.

In 1959, Los Alamos agreed to make Godiva II available to DOD contractors free of charge for two days each month, acknowledging its unique facility for radiation tests.

Godiva's success in creating intense bursts spurred development of similar pulsed reactors, which also suffered accidental excursions, for example: 28 May 1965 at the White Sands Missile Range (parts were thrown 15 feet (4.6 m)); and 6 September 1968 at the Aberdeen Proving Ground (middle melted, disks warped and bolts stretched).

In December 2002, the U.S. Department of Energy announced it was to move its TA-18 testing equipment including the Godiva burst machine from the LANL to the Device Assembly Facility (DAF) at the Nevada Test Site (NTS).

== See also ==
- Flattop (critical assembly)

== General references ==
- Engelke, Morris J.; Bemis, Edwin A. Jr.; Sayeg, J. A. (May 1961). "LA-2569 Neutron tissue dose rate survey for the Godiva II critical assembly" (PDF). Los Alamos Scientific Laboratory.
- Frisch, Otto Robert (1980). What Little I Remember. Cambridge University Press. ISBN 978-0-52-128010-5.
- Garcia, Manual (8 August 2005). "Test Plan for Godiva Move from LANL TA-18 to NTS DAF" (PDF). Lawrence Livermore National Laboratory. id=UCRL-TR-214269
- Kazi, A.H.; Dubyoski, H.G.; Dickinson, R.W (1969). "Preoperational Test Experience with the Army Pulse Radiation Facility Reactor" (PDF). Proc. of the National Topical Meeting on Fast Burst Reactors. Albuquerque, NM: United States Atomic Energy Commission. pp. 353–371.
- McLaughlin et al. "A Review of Criticality Accidents / 2000 Revision / LA-13638" (PDF). Los Alamos National Laboratory. May 2000. Archived from the original on 20 March 2009.
  - LA-13638 covers United States, Russia, United Kingdom, and Japan, and is also available here and at this page, which also tries to track down documents referenced in the report.
- U.S. Department of Energy. "Criticality Experiments Facility" (PDF). National Nuclear Security Administration Nevada Site Office. 15 June 2005. Archived from the original (PDF) on 23 September 2006.
- Zipprich, L.J. (1 April 1959). "Radiation effects testing at the Los Alamos Godiva II A facility". doi:10.2172/4268715. hdl:2027/umn.31951d03527625h. OSTI 4268715. OSTI ID: 4268715
