= Critical mass =

Smallest amount of fissile material needed to sustain a nuclear reaction

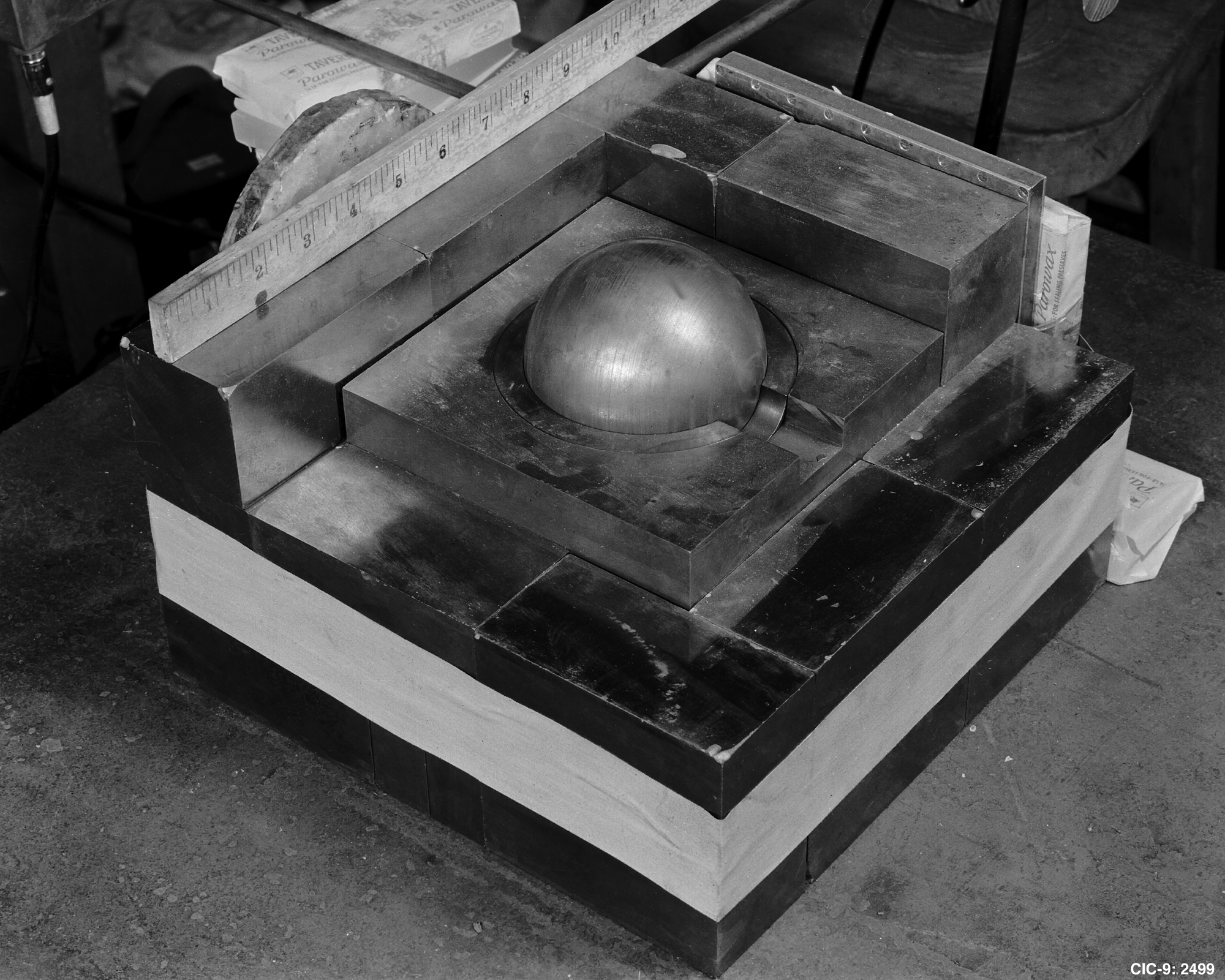
A re-creation of the 1945 criticality accident involving Harry Daghlian: a plutonium pit (the core later known as the Demon core) is surrounded by blocks of neutron-reflective tungsten carbide. The original experiment was designed to measure the radiation produced when an extra block was added. The mass went supercritical when the block was placed improperly by being dropped.

In nuclear engineering, critical mass is the minimum mass of the fissile material needed for a sustained nuclear chain reaction in a particular setup. The critical mass of a fissile material depends upon its nuclear cross section, density, shape, enrichment, purity, temperature, and surroundings. It is an important parameter of a nuclear reactor core or nuclear weapon and is important in nuclear weapon design.

Critical size is the minimum size of the fissile material needed for a sustained nuclear chain reaction in a particular setup. If the size of the reactor core is less than a certain minimum, too many fission neutrons escape through its surface and the chain reaction is not sustained. A perfect sphere, which has the lowest surface-area-to-volume ratio, gives the minimal critical size.

== Criticality ==
When a nuclear chain reaction in a mass of fissile material is self-sustaining but not growing, the mass is said to be in a critical state, in which there is no increase or decrease in power, temperature, or neutron population.

A numerical measure of a critical mass depends on the effective neutron multiplication factor k, the average number of neutrons released per fission event that go on to cause another fission event rather than being absorbed or leaving the material.

A subcritical mass is a mass that does not have the ability to sustain a fission chain reaction. A population of neutrons introduced to a subcritical assembly will exponentially decrease. In this case, known as subcriticality, k < 1.

A critical mass is a mass of fissile material that self-sustains a fission chain reaction. In this case, known as criticality, k = 1. A steady rate of spontaneous fission causes a proportionally steady level of neutron activity.

A supercritical mass is a mass which, once fission has started, will proceed at an increasing rate. In this case, known as supercriticality, k > 1. The constant of proportionality increases as k increases. The material may settle into equilibrium (i.e. become critical again) at an elevated temperature/power level or destroy itself.

Due to spontaneous fission a supercritical mass will undergo a chain reaction. For example, a spherical critical mass of pure uranium-235 (^{235}U) with a mass of about 52 kilograms (115 lb) would experience about 0.3 spontaneous fissions per second. The probability that one such event will cause a chain reaction depends on how much the mass exceeds the critical mass. Fission can also be initiated by neutrons produced by cosmic rays.

It is possible for a fuel assembly to be critical at near zero power. If the perfect quantity of fuel were added to a slightly subcritical mass to create an "exactly critical mass", the chain reaction would be self-sustaining at a steady rate, each neutron generation replacing itself exactly. Only over much longer timescales, as fission slowly consumes the fuel, does the reactivity gradually fall and the assembly become subcritical.

== Factors ==
The mass where criticality occurs may be changed by modifying certain attributes such as fuel, shape, temperature, density and the installation of a neutron-reflective substance. These attributes have complex interactions and interdependencies. The factors listed are for the simplest/ideal cases.

=== Shape ===
A mass may be exactly critical without being a perfect homogeneous sphere. More closely refining the shape toward a perfect sphere will make the mass supercritical. Conversely changing the shape to a less perfect sphere will decrease its reactivity and make it subcritical.

=== Temperature ===
A mass may be exactly critical at a particular temperature. Fission and absorption cross-sections increase as the relative neutron velocity decreases. As fuel temperature increases, neutrons of a given energy appear faster and thus fission/absorption is less likely. This is not unrelated to Doppler broadening of the ^{238}U resonances but is common to all fuels/absorbers/configurations. Neglecting the very important resonances, the total neutron cross-section of every material exhibits an inverse relationship with relative neutron velocity. Hot fuel is always less reactive than cold fuel (over/under moderation in LWR is a different topic). Thermal expansion associated with temperature increase also contributes a negative coefficient of reactivity since fuel atoms are moving farther apart. A mass that is exactly critical at room temperature would be sub-critical in an environment anywhere above room temperature due to thermal expansion alone.

If the perfect quantity of fuel were added to a slightly subcritical mass, to create a barely supercritical mass, the temperature of the assembly would rise until the negative temperature coefficient of reactivity reduces the reactivity back to critical (for example: 1 K above the ambient temperature), where the assembly then remains at a steady power level.

=== Density ===
The higher the density, the lower the critical mass. The density of a material at a constant temperature can be changed by varying the pressure or tension or by changing crystal structure (see allotropes of plutonium). An ideal mass will become subcritical if allowed to expand or conversely the same mass will become supercritical if compressed. Changing the temperature may also change the density; however, the effect on critical mass is then complicated by temperature effects (see § Temperature) and by whether the material expands or contracts with increased temperature. Assuming the material expands with temperature (enriched uranium-235 at room temperature for example), at an exactly critical state, it will become subcritical if warmed to lower density or become supercritical if cooled to higher density. Such a material is said to have a negative temperature coefficient of reactivity to indicate that its reactivity decreases when its temperature increases. Using such a material as fuel means fission decreases as the fuel temperature increases.

=== Presence of a neutron reflector ===
A neutron reflector is a layer of material placed around the core that scatters escaping neutrons back into it. Because fewer neutrons leak out, a core of a given fuel and moderator composition reaches criticality at a smaller size, which lowers the amount of fissile material needed.

The gain is usually expressed as the reflector savings, the amount by which the critical dimension shrinks when the reflector is added. For a reflector made of the moderator material, the savings peaks at a thickness of roughly two migration lengths. In thermal reactors a useful approximation is that the savings equals the migration length of the reflector material: roughly 6 cm in a light-water reactor, and more than half a meter in a graphite one.

What matters in a reflector material is that it scatters neutrons well while absorbing few: a large scattering cross section and a small absorption cross section. In thermal reactors the moderator typically doubles as the reflector (ordinary water, heavy water, or graphite), while fast reactors, which have no moderator, use elements of high mass number for reflection, such as steel, uranium, tungsten, or beryllium.

=== Presence of a tamper ===
In a bomb, a dense shell of material surrounding the fissile core will contain, via inertia, the expanding fissioning material, which increases the efficiency. This is known as a tamper. A tamper also tends to act as a neutron reflector. Because a bomb relies on fast neutrons (not ones moderated by reflection with light elements, as in a reactor), the neutrons reflected by a tamper are slowed by their collisions with the tamper nuclei, and because it takes time for the reflected neutrons to return to the fissile core, they take rather longer to be absorbed by a fissile nucleus. But they do contribute to the reaction, and can decrease the critical mass by a factor of four. Also, if the tamper is (e.g. depleted) uranium, it can fission due to the high energy neutrons generated by the primary explosion. This can greatly increase yield, especially if even more neutrons are generated by fusing hydrogen isotopes, in a so-called boosted configuration.

=== Escape probability ===
Only a fraction of the neutrons produced by fission are absorbed inside the mass; the rest leak out through the surface. The multiplication factor of a finite system is the infinite-medium value times the nonleakage probability, the fraction of neutrons that are absorbed before escaping.

The nonleakage probability is set by the geometry: it approaches unity as the system is made larger, because a smaller system has more surface area per unit volume and a more strongly curved flux distribution (a larger geometric buckling). This is the mechanism behind the shape effect: for the same volume, a sphere has the smallest surface and therefore the least leakage.

==== Elastic scattering ====
In elastic scattering a neutron bounces off a nucleus with the total kinetic energy conserved; the neutron is deflected and part of its energy goes into the nucleus. The fraction of energy lost in a single collision depends on the mass of the target nucleus: a neutron can lose all of its energy in a head-on collision with hydrogen, whose nucleus has nearly the same mass, while with carbon it can lose at most about 28% per collision. Each scattering event also lengthens the neutron's path through the material, raising the chance that it is absorbed before it can leak out.

== Values ==
=== Bare sphere ===
Top: The sphere of fissile material is too small to allow the chain reaction to become self-sustaining as neutrons generated by fissions can too easily escape. Middle: By increasing the mass of the sphere to a critical mass, the reaction can become self-sustaining. Bottom: Surrounding the original sphere with a neutron reflector increases the efficiency of the reactions and also allows the reaction to become self-sustaining.

The shape with minimal critical mass is a sphere. Bare-sphere critical masses at normal density of some actinides are listed in the following table. Most information on bare sphere masses is considered classified, since it is critical to nuclear weapons design, but some documents have been declassified.

Nuclide	Half-life (y)	Critical mass (kg)	Diameter (cm)	Ref
uranium-232	68.9	3.7	7.2	
uranium-233	159,200	15	11	
uranium-235	704,000,000	52	17	
neptunium-236	153,000	7	8.7	
neptunium-237	2,144,000	60	18	
plutonium-238	87.7	9.04–10.07	9.5–9.9	
plutonium-239	24,110	10	9.9	
plutonium-240	6561	40	15	
plutonium-241	14.33	12	10.5	
plutonium-242	375,000	75–100	19–21	
americium-241	432.6	55–77	20–23	
americium-242m	141	9–14	11–13	
americium-243	7350	180–280	30–35	
curium-243	29.1	7.34–10	10–11	
curium-244	18.11	13.5–30	12.4–16	
curium-245	8250	9.41–12.3	11–12	
curium-246	4700	39–70.1	18–21	
curium-247	15,600,000	6.94–7.06	9.9	
berkelium-247	1380	75.7	11.8-12.2	
berkelium-249	0.896	192	16.1-16.6	
californium-249	351	6	9	
californium-251	900	5.46	8.5	
californium-252	2.645	2.73	6.9	
einsteinium-254	0.755	9.89	7.1	

The critical mass for lower-grade uranium depends strongly on the grade: with 45% ^{235}U, the bare-sphere critical mass is around 185 kilograms (408 lb); with 19.75% ^{235}U it is over 780 kilograms (1,720 lb); and with 15% ^{235}U, it is well over 1,350 kilograms (2,980 lb). In all of these cases, the use of a neutron reflector like beryllium can substantially drop this amount, however: with a 5 centimetres (2.0 in) reflector, the critical mass of 19.75%-enriched uranium drops to 403 kilograms (888 lb), and with a 15 centimetres (5.9 in) reflector it drops to 144 kilograms (317 lb), for example.

The critical mass is inversely proportional to the square of the density. If the density is 1% more and the mass 2% less, then the volume is 3% less and the diameter 1% less. The underlying reason is that a neutron's mean free path (the average distance it travels between collisions) is inversely proportional to the density, and the critical radius is set by that mean free path (see the random-walk estimate below): a denser material therefore has both a shorter mean free path and a smaller critical radius, and the critical mass, being the density times the cube of the radius, scales as 1/ρ^{2}. This is something that must be taken into consideration when attempting more precise estimates of critical masses of plutonium isotopes than the approximate values given above, because plutonium metal has a large number of different crystal phases which can have widely varying densities.

Note that not all neutrons contribute to the chain reaction. Some escape and others undergo radiative capture.

Let q denote the probability that a given neutron induces fission in a nucleus. Consider only prompt neutrons, and let ν denote the number of prompt neutrons generated in a nuclear fission. For example, ν ≈ 2.5 for uranium-235. Then, criticality occurs when ν·q = 1. The dependence of this upon geometry, mass, and density appears through the factor q.

Given a total interaction cross section σ (typically measured in barns), the mean free path of a prompt neutron is $\ell^{-1} = n \sigma$ where n is the nuclear number density. Most interactions are scattering events, so that a given neutron obeys a random walk until it either escapes from the medium or causes a fission reaction. So long as other loss mechanisms are not significant, then, the radius of a spherical critical mass is rather roughly given by the product of the mean free path $\ell$ and the square root of one plus the number of scattering events per fission event (call this s), since the net distance travelled in a random walk is proportional to the square root of the number of steps:

$$R_c \simeq \ell \sqrt{s} \simeq \frac{\sqrt{s}}{n \sigma}$$

Note again, however, that this is only a rough estimate.

In terms of the total mass M, the nuclear mass m, the density ρ, and a fudge factor f which takes into account geometrical and other effects, criticality corresponds to

$$1 = \frac{f \sigma}{m \sqrt{s}} \rho^{2/3} M^{1/3}$$

which clearly recovers the aforementioned result that critical mass depends inversely on the square of the density.

Alternatively, one may restate this more succinctly in terms of the areal density of mass, Σ:

$$1 = \frac{f' \sigma}{m \sqrt{s}} \Sigma$$

where the factor f has been rewritten as f' to account for the fact that the two values may differ depending upon geometrical effects and how one defines Σ. For example, for a bare solid sphere of ^{239}Pu criticality is at 320 kg/m^{2}, regardless of density, and for ^{235}U at 550 kg/m^{2}. In any case, criticality then depends upon a typical neutron "seeing" an amount of nuclei around it such that the areal density of nuclei exceeds a certain threshold.

This is applied in implosion-type nuclear weapons where a spherical mass of fissile material that is substantially less than a critical mass is made supercritical by very rapidly increasing ρ (and thus Σ as well) (see below). Indeed, sophisticated nuclear weapons programs can make a functional device from less material than more primitive weapons programs require.

Aside from the math, there is a simple physical analog that helps explain this result. Consider diesel fumes belched from an exhaust pipe. Initially the fumes appear black, then gradually you are able to see through them without any trouble. This is not because the total scattering cross section of all the soot particles has changed, but because the soot has dispersed. If we consider a transparent cube of length L on a side, filled with soot, then the optical depth of this medium is inversely proportional to the square of L, and therefore proportional to the areal density of soot particles: we can make it easier to see through the imaginary cube just by making the cube larger.

Several uncertainties contribute to the determination of a precise value for critical masses, including (1) detailed knowledge of fission cross sections, (2) calculation of geometric effects. This latter problem provided significant motivation for the development of the Monte Carlo method in computational physics by Nicholas Metropolis and Stanislaw Ulam. In fact, even for a homogeneous solid sphere, the exact calculation is by no means trivial. Finally, note that the calculation can also be performed by assuming a continuum approximation for the neutron transport. This reduces it to a diffusion problem. However, as the typical linear dimensions are not significantly larger than the mean free path, such an approximation is only marginally applicable.

Finally, note that for some idealized geometries, the critical mass might formally be infinite, and other parameters are used to describe criticality. For example, consider an infinite sheet of fissionable material. For any finite thickness, this corresponds to an infinite mass. However, criticality is only achieved once the thickness of this slab exceeds a critical value.

=== Sphere with tamper ===
A graph showing the calculated critical masses of uranium (in kilograms, left axis) as a function of the thickness of a beryllium reflector (in centimeters, bottom axis) and U-235 enrichment level (line labels).

The critical mass can be greatly reduced by the use of a tamper. The following table lists the values for common neutron reflectors, where λ_{tamp} is the mean free path of a neutron within the tamper material before an elastic scattering. In nuclear weapon design, natural uranium is primarily used. Tungsten carbide was initially used in the Little Boy.

	Minimum critical mass (kg)		
Tamper	λ_{tamp} (cm)	U-235	Pu-239
Aluminium	5.595	22.0	9.7
Beryllium oxide	2.549	8.6	3.7
Lead	5.426	21.3	9.3
Tungsten carbide	3.159	11.3	4.9
Depleted uranium/Uranium-238	4.342	16.5	7.2

== Nuclear weapon design ==
If two pieces of subcritical material are not brought together fast enough, nuclear predetonation (fizzle) can occur, whereby a very small explosion will blow the bulk of the material apart.

Until detonation is desired, a nuclear weapon must be kept subcritical. In the case of a uranium gun-type bomb, this can be achieved by keeping the fuel in a number of separate pieces, each below the critical size either because they are too small or unfavorably shaped. To produce detonation, the pieces of uranium are brought together rapidly. In Little Boy, this was achieved by firing a piece of uranium (a 'doughnut') down a gun barrel onto another piece (a 'spike'). This design is referred to as a gun-type fission weapon.

A theoretical 100% pure ^{239}Pu weapon could also be constructed as a gun-type weapon, like the Manhattan Project's proposed Thin Man design. In reality, this is impractical because 100% pure ^{239}Pu cannot be achieved. Even "weapons grade" ^{239}Pu is contaminated with a small amount of ^{240}Pu, which has a strong propensity toward spontaneous fission. Because of this, a reasonably sized gun-type weapon would suffer nuclear reaction (predetonation) before the masses of plutonium would be in a position for a full-fledged explosion to occur.

Instead, the plutonium is present as a subcritical sphere (or other shape), which may or may not be hollow. Detonation is produced by exploding a shaped charge surrounding the sphere, increasing the density (and collapsing the cavity, if present) to produce a prompt critical configuration. This is known as an implosion type weapon.

== Notable firsts ==
First critical assemblies of various types
Assembly name	Location	Year	Fuel	Reactivity timescale	Neutron spectrum	Moderator
Chicago Pile-1	Metallurgical Laboratory	1942	Natural uranium	Delayed	Thermal	Graphite
LOPO/Water Boiler	Los Alamos Laboratory	1944	Low-enriched uranium	Delayed	Thermal	Light water
LOPO/Water Boiler	Los Alamos Laboratory	1944	Low-enriched uranium	Prompt	Thermal	Light water
Dragon	Los Alamos Laboratory	1945	Highly enriched uranium	Prompt	Fast	None
Clementine	Los Alamos Laboratory	1946	Weapons-grade plutonium	Delayed	Fast	None

== See also ==
- Criticality (status)
- Criticality accident
- Nuclear criticality safety
- Geometric and material buckling
