= Criticality accident =

Uncontrolled nuclear fission chain reaction

A criticality accident is an accidental uncontrolled nuclear fission chain reaction. It is sometimes referred to as a critical excursion, critical power excursion, divergent chain reaction, or simply critical. Any such event involves the unintended accumulation or arrangement of a critical mass of fissile material, for example enriched uranium or plutonium. Criticality accidents can release potentially fatal radiation doses if they occur in an unprotected environment.

Under normal circumstances, a critical or supercritical fission reaction (one that is self-sustaining in power or increasing in power) should only occur inside a safely shielded location, such as a reactor core or a suitable test environment. A criticality accident occurs if the same reaction is achieved unintentionally, for example in an unsafe environment or during reactor maintenance.

Though dangerous and frequently lethal to humans within the immediate area, the critical mass formed would not be capable of producing a massive nuclear explosion of the type that fission bombs are designed to produce. This is because all the design features needed to make a nuclear warhead cannot arise by chance. In some cases, the heat released by the chain reaction will cause the fissile (and other nearby) materials to expand. In such cases, the chain reaction can either settle into a low power steady state or may even become either temporarily or permanently shut down (subcritical).

In the history of atomic power development, at least 60 criticality accidents have occurred, including 22 in process environments, outside nuclear reactor cores or experimental assemblies, and 38 in small experimental reactors and other test assemblies. Although process accidents occurring outside reactors are characterized by large releases of radiation, the releases are localized. Nonetheless, fatal radiation exposures have occurred to persons close to these events, resulting in more than 20 fatalities. In a few reactor and critical experiment assembly accidents, the energy released has caused significant mechanical damage or steam explosions.

== Physical basis ==
Criticality occurs when sufficient fissile material (a critical mass) accumulates in a small volume such that each fission, on average, produces one neutron that in turn strikes another fissile atom and causes another fission. This causes the fission chain reaction to become self-sustaining within the mass of material. In other words, in a critical mass, the number of neutrons emitted over time, exactly equals the number of neutrons captured by another nucleus or lost to the environment. If the mass is supercritical, the number of neutrons emitted per unit time exceeds those absorbed or lost, resulting in a cascade of nuclear fissions at increasing rate.

Criticality can be achieved by using metallic uranium or plutonium, liquid solutions, or powder slurries. The chain reaction is influenced by a range of parameters noted by the mnemonics MAGIC MERV (mass, absorption, geometry, interaction, concentration, moderation, enrichment, reflection, and volume) and MERMAIDS (mass, enrichment, reflection, moderation, absorption, interaction, density, and shape). Temperature is also a factor in criticality.

Calculations can be performed to determine the conditions needed for a critical state, e.g. mass, geometry, concentration etc. Where fissile materials are handled in civil and military installations, specially trained personnel are employed to carry out such calculations and ensure that all reasonably practicable measures are used to prevent criticality accidents, during both planned normal operations and any potential process upset conditions that cannot be dismissed on the basis of negligible likelihoods (reasonably foreseeable accidents).

The assembly of a critical mass establishes a nuclear chain reaction, resulting in an exponential rate of change in the neutron population over space and time leading to an increase in neutron flux. This increased flux and attendant fission rate produces radiation that contains both a neutron and gamma ray component and is extremely dangerous to any unprotected nearby life-form. The rate of change of neutron population depends on the neutron generation time, which is characteristic of the neutron population, the state of "criticality", and the fissile medium.

A nuclear fission creates approximately 2.5 neutrons per fission event on average. Hence, to maintain a stable, exactly critical chain reaction, 1.5 neutrons per fission event must either leak from the system or be absorbed without causing further fissions.

For every 1,000 neutrons released by fission, a small number, typically no more than about 7, are delayed neutrons which are emitted from the fission product precursors, called delayed neutron emitters. This delayed neutron fraction, on the order of 0.007 for uranium, is crucial for the control of the neutron chain reaction in reactors. It is called one dollar of reactivity. The lifetime of delayed neutrons ranges from fractions of seconds to almost 100 seconds after fission. The neutrons are usually classified in 6 delayed neutron groups. The average neutron lifetime considering delayed neutrons is approximately 0.1 sec, which makes the chain reaction relatively easy to control over time. The remaining 993 prompt neutrons are released very quickly, approximately 1 μs after the fission event.

In steady-state operation, nuclear reactors operate at exact criticality. When at least one dollar of reactivity is added above the exact critical point (where the neutron production rate balances the rate of neutron losses, from both absorption and leakage) then the chain reaction does not rely on delayed neutrons. In such cases, the neutron population can rapidly increase exponentially, with a very small time constant, known as the prompt neutron lifetime. Thus there is a very large increase in neutron population over a very short time frame. Since each fission event contributes approximately 200 MeV per fission, this results in a very large energy burst as a "prompt-critical spike". This spike can be easily detected by radiation dosimetry instrumentation and "criticality accident alarm system" detectors that are properly deployed.

== Accident types ==
Criticality accidents are divided into one of two categories:

- Process accidents, where controls in place to prevent any criticality are breached;
- Reactor accidents, which occur due to operator errors or other unintended events (e.g., during maintenance or fuel loading) in locations intended to achieve or approach criticality, such as nuclear power plants, nuclear reactors, and nuclear experiments. The Chernobyl disaster was in fact a criticality accident of very huge power, but is normally listed under the Nuclear meltdown-accidents, because it was a power plant whose core melted completely after the criticality excursion.

Excursion types can be classified into four categories depicting the nature of the evolution over time:

1. Prompt criticality excursion
2. Transient criticality excursion
3. Exponential excursion
4. Steady-state excursion

The prompt-critical excursion is characterized by a power history with an initial prompt-critical spike as previously noted, which either self-terminates or continues with a tail region that decreases over an extended period of time. The transient critical excursion is characterized by a continuing or repeating spike pattern (sometimes known as "chugging") after the initial prompt-critical excursion. The longest of the 22 process accidents occurred at Hanford Works in 1962 and lasted for 37.5 hours. The 1999 Tokaimura nuclear accident remained critical for about 20 hours, until it was shut down by active intervention. The exponential excursion is characterized by a reactivity of less than one dollar added, where the neutron population rises as an exponential over time, until either feedback effects or intervention reduce the reactivity. The exponential excursion can reach a peak power level, then decrease over time, or reach a steady-state power level, where the critical state is exactly achieved for a "steady-state" excursion.

The steady-state excursion is also a state in which the heat generated by fission is balanced by the heat losses to the ambient environment. This excursion has been characterized by the Oklo natural reactor that was naturally produced within uranium deposits in Gabon, Africa about 1.7 billion years ago.

== Known accidents ==
According to modern estimations, 67 known criticality accidents have occurred globally between 1945 and 1999, with none confirmed since. They have occurred during experimentation and production relating to nuclear weapon cores, research reactors, commercial reactors, and naval reactors.

A 2000 Los Alamos report recorded 60 criticality accidents between 1945 and 1999. These caused twenty-one deaths: seven in the United States, ten in the Soviet Union, two in Japan, one in Argentina, and one in Yugoslavia. Nine have been due to process accidents and the others to reactor and critical experiment accidents.

The Los Alamos also grouped reactor and critical experiment accidents by material: 5 in fissile solutions, 15 in bare and reflected metal systems, 13 in moderated metal and oxide systems, and 5 in miscellaneous systems.

A 2014 University of Nevada report identified seven further criticality accidents prior to 2000 that were not included in the Los Alamos report. Five occurred in the maintenance and refuelling of Soviet nuclear submarine reactors, and two occurred in Japanese commercial reactors during testing and were covered up until 2007.

The table below gives a selection of well documented incidents.

Date	Location	Description	Injuries	Fatalities	Refs
1944	Los Alamos	Otto Frisch received a larger than intended dose of radiation when leaning over an assembly of uranium-235 for a couple of seconds. He noticed that the red lamps (that normally flickered intermittently when neutrons were being emitted) were "glowing continuously". Frisch's body had reflected some neutrons back to the device, increasing its neutron multiplication, and it was only by quickly leaning back and away from the device and removing a couple of the uranium blocks that Frisch escaped harm. Afterwards he said, "If I had hesitated for another two seconds before removing the material ... the dose would have been fatal".	0	0	
4 June 1945	Los Alamos	Scientist John Bistline was conducting an experiment to determine the effect of surrounding a sub-critical mass (35.4 kg) of uranium enriched to an average of 79.2% U-235 with a water reflector. The experiment unexpectedly became critical when water leaked into the polyethylene box holding the metal. When that happened, the water began to function as a highly-effective moderator rather than just a neutron reflector. An estimated 3–4 × 10^{16} fissions occurred and the temperature of the metal may have risen to 200 °C. Three people (Bistline, J. Kupferberg, and H. Hammel) received non-fatal doses of radiation. A classified postwar report said that: "No ill effects were felt by the men involved, although one lost a little of the hair on his head. The material was so radioactive for several days that experiments planned for those days had to be postponed."	3	0	
21 August 1945	Los Alamos	Scientist Harry Daghlian suffered fatal radiation poisoning and died 25 days later after accidentally dropping a tungsten carbide brick onto a sphere of plutonium, which was later (see next entry) nicknamed the demon core. The brick acted as a neutron reflector, bringing the mass to criticality. This was the first known criticality accident causing a fatality.	0	1	
21 May 1946	Los Alamos	Scientist Louis Slotin accidentally irradiated himself during a similar incident (called the "Pajarito accident" at the time) using the same "demon core" sphere of plutonium involved in the Daghlian accident. Slotin surrounded the plutonium sphere with two 9-inch diameter hemispherical cups of the neutron-reflecting material beryllium, one above and one below. He was using a screwdriver to keep the cups slightly apart and the assembly thereby subcritical, contrary to normal protocols. When the screwdriver accidentally slipped, the cups closed around the plutonium, sending the assembly supercritical. Slotin quickly disassembled the device, likely sparing others in the room from lethal exposure, but Slotin himself died of radiation poisoning nine days later. The demon core was melted down and the material was reused in other bomb tests in subsequent years.	8	1	
3 February 1954	Los Alamos	A criticality accident occurred while using the Lady Godiva Device. An operator error during the preparations for a scheduled Prompt burst caused a control rod to be inserted, increasing reactivity above the prompt-critical threshold. No personnel was exposed to radiation. The Godiva Device itself sustained only minor damage.	0	0	
12 February 1957	Los Alamos	On 12 February 1957, a second criticality accident occurred while using the Lady Godiva Device. A large mass of graphite and polyethylene was moved close to the device. Either an underestimation of the change in neutron reflection or an unplanned movement of the materials closer to the device caused the critical excursion. The damage was limited to the supporting structure and operating personnel received no significant radiation exposure. Repair of the Godiva was not practical, instead construction of Godiva II was sped up.	0	0	
16 June 1958	Oak Ridge, Tennessee	The first recorded uranium-processing–related criticality occurred at the Y-12 Plant. During a routine leak test a fissile solution was unknowingly allowed to collect in a 55-gallon drum. The excursion lasted for approximately 20 minutes and resulted in eight workers receiving significant exposure. There were no fatalities, though five were hospitalized for 44 days. All eight workers eventually returned to work.	8	0	
15 October 1958	Vinča Nuclear Institute	A criticality excursion occurred in the heavy water RB reactor at the Boris Kidrič Nuclear Institute in Vinča, Yugoslavia, killing one person and injuring five. The initial survivors received the first bone marrow transplant in Europe.	5	1	
30 December 1958	Los Alamos	Cecil Kelley, a chemical operator working on plutonium purification, switched on a stirrer on a large mixing tank, which created a vortex in the tank. The plutonium, dissolved in an organic solvent, flowed into the center of the vortex. Due to a procedural error, the mixture contained 3.27 kg of plutonium, which reached criticality for about 200 microseconds. Kelley received 3,900 to 4,900 rad (36.385 to 45.715 Sv) according to later estimates. The other operators reported seeing a bright flash of blue light and found Kelley outside, saying "I'm burning up! I'm burning up!" He died 35 hours later.	0	1	
3 January 1961	SL-1, 40 miles (64 km) west of Idaho Falls	SL-1, a United States Army experimental nuclear power reactor underwent a steam explosion and core disassembly due to improper manual withdrawal of the central control rod, killing its three operators by explosion force and impaling.	0	3	
24 July 1964	Wood River Junction	The facility in Richmond, Rhode Island was designed to recover uranium from scrap material left over from fuel element production. Technician Robert Peabody, intending to add trichloroethene to a tank containing uranium-235 and sodium carbonate to remove organics, added uranium solution instead, producing a criticality excursion. The operator was exposed to a fatal radiation dose of 10,000 rad (100 Gy). Ninety minutes later a second excursion happened when a plant manager returned to the building and turned off the agitator, exposing himself and another administrator to doses of up to 100 rad (1 Gy) without ill effect. The operator involved in the initial exposure died 49 hours after the incident.	0	1	
7 February 1965	Severodvinsk	Refueling of Soviet November-class submarine. Reactor lid needed repositioning, and had control rods attached. Lid and thus rods were withdrawn too far, causing reactor criticality. All personnel were withdrawn.	Unknown	Unknown	
12 February 1965	Severodvinsk	Occurred during investigation of accident five days prior. Lid lifted again, causing reactor criticality, fire, and radioactive steam. Fire fought by extinguishers, fresh water, and salt water. Contaminated water spread throughout submarine. One reactor destroyed, compartment replaced.	7	?	
23 August 1968	Severodvinsk	During maintenance of a Soviet Navy K-140 Yankee-class submarine, due to dysfunctional wiring and neutron monitoring, control rods were withdrawn instead of inserted. Criticality caused 20x nominal power, 4x nominal pressure, fuel damage, and auto shutdown. The closed hull and reactor vessel prevented casualties. The damaged, contaminated reactor system was dumped in the Novaya Zemlya depression in the Kara Sea.	0	0	
10 December 1968	Mayak	The nuclear fuel processing center in central Russia was experimenting with plutonium purification techniques using different solvents for solvent extraction. Some of these solvents carried over to a tank not intended to hold them, and exceeded the fissile safe limit for that tank. Against procedure a shift supervisor ordered two operators to lower the tank inventory and remove the solvent to another vessel. Two operators were using an "unfavorable geometry vessel in an improvised and unapproved operation as a temporary vessel for storing plutonium organic solution"; in other words, the operators were decanting plutonium solutions into the wrong type—more importantly, shape—of container. After most of the solvent solution had been poured out, there was a flash of light and heat. "Startled, the operator dropped the bottle, ran down the stairs, and from the room." After the complex had been evacuated, the shift supervisor and radiation control supervisor re-entered the building. The shift supervisor then deceived the radiation control supervisor and entered the room of the incident; this was followed by the third and largest criticality excursion that irradiated the shift supervisor with a fatal dose of radiation, possibly due to an attempt by the supervisor to pour the solution down a floor drain.	1	1	
18 January 1970	Krasnoye Sormovo Factory No. 112, Nizhny Novgorod	Construction of a Soviet submarine K-320. Weakly fixed provisional control rods lifted by high velocity hydraulic test cooling water. Radioactive water released in factory hall. Western claim and Russian denial of a factory fire.	Unknown	Unknown	
2 November 1978	Fukushima Daiichi Nuclear Power Plant	Accidental criticality during a control rod hydraulics test on Unit 3. Operator failed to monitor reactor state and criticality lasted 7 hours. No nuclear material released due to pressure vessel head being closed. Event covered up until 2007.	0	0	
30 September 1980	Severodvinsk	Maintenance on a Soviet submarine K-222. Failure of the instrumentation and automatic control system allowing control rod withdrawal. No contamination. Both defueled reactors dumped in Techeniye Inlet at Novaya Zemlya in 1988.	0	0	
23 September 1983	Centro Atomico Constituyentes	An operator at the RA-2 research reactor in Buenos Aires, Argentina, received a fatal radiation dose of 3700 rad (37 Gy) while changing the fuel rod configuration with moderating water in the reactor. The operator died after 49 hours. Two others were injured.	2	1	
10 August 1985	Chazhma Bay, Vladivostok	The reactor tank lid of the nuclear powered Soviet submarine K-431 was being replaced, after it had been refuelled. The lid was laid incorrectly and had to be lifted again with the control rods attached. A beam was supposed to prevent the lid from being lifted too far, but this beam was positioned incorrectly, and the lid with control rods was lifted up too far. At 10:55 AM the starboard reactor became prompt critical, resulting in a criticality excursion of about 5·10^{18} fissions and a thermal/steam explosion. The explosion expelled the new load of fuel, destroyed the machine enclosures, ruptured the submarine's pressure hull and aft bulkhead, and partially destroyed the fuelling shack, with the shack's roof falling 70 metres away in the water. A fire followed, which was extinguished after 4 hours, after which assessment of the radioactive contamination began. There were ten fatalities and 49 other people suffered radiation injuries, and a large area northwest across the Dunay Peninsula was severely contaminated.	49	10	
17 June 1997	Sarov	Russian Federal Nuclear Center senior researcher Alexandr Zakharov received a fatal dose of 4850 rem in a criticality accident.	0	1	
18 June 1999	Shika Nuclear Power Plant	Rod withdrawal during a test on Unit 1 caused unintended criticality. Test measures prevented immediate reinsertion of control rods. Rods reinserted and criticality ended after 15 minutes. 6 workers in radiation controlled area. Gamma pocket dosimeters, film badges, exhaust pipe monitors, and site boundary monitoring posts showed no radiation change. Shift staff decided not to report the accident to prevent construction delays to Shika Unit 2. Covered up until 2007.	0	0	
30 September 1999	Tokaimura nuclear accidents	At the Japanese uranium reprocessing facility in Ibaraki Prefecture, technicians working on producing fuel for the Jōyō fast reactor poured a uranyl nitrate solution into a precipitation tank which was not designed to hold a solution of this uranium enrichment, causing an eventual critical mass to be formed, resulting in the death of two workers from severe radiation exposure.	1	2	

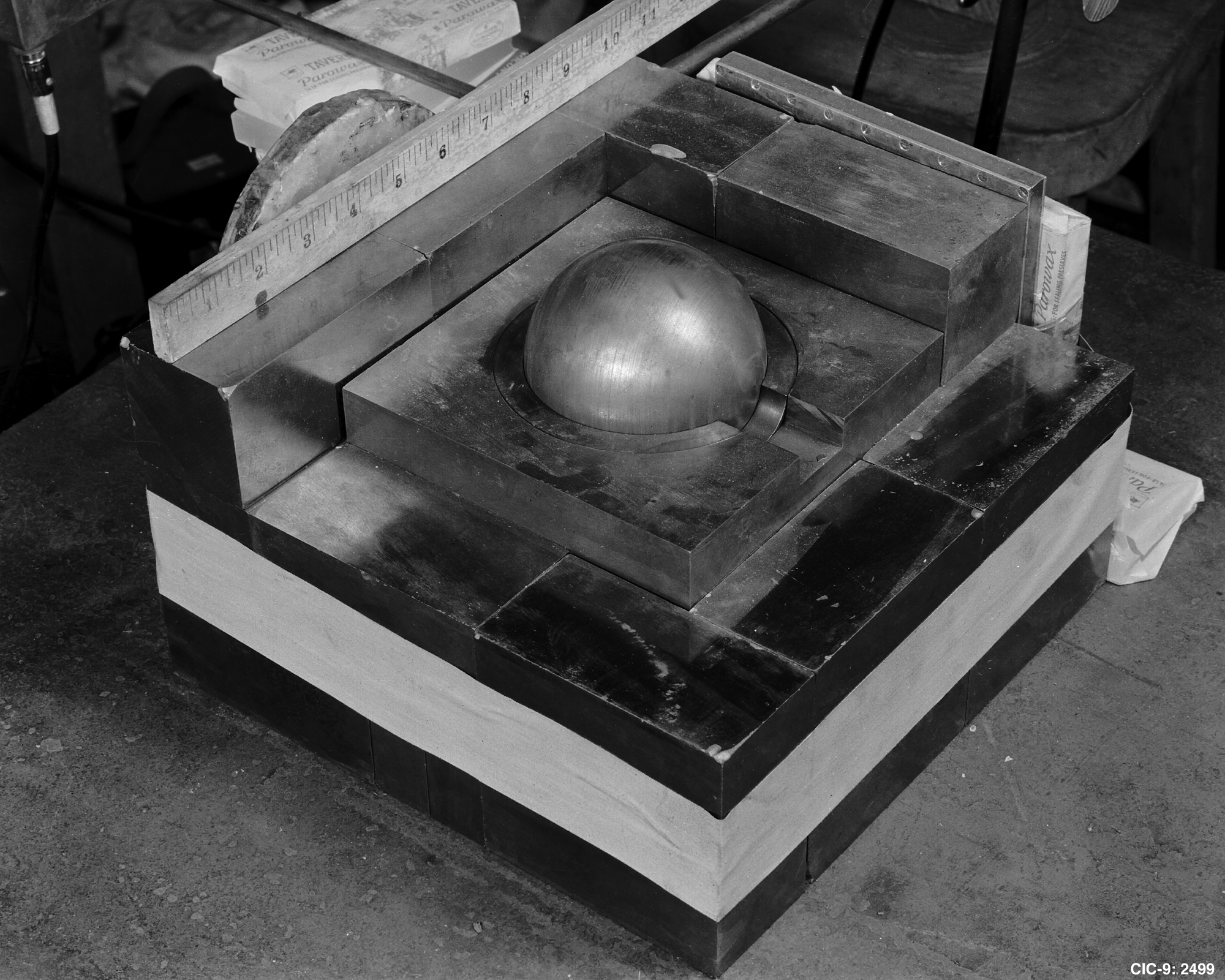
The sphere of plutonium surrounded by neutron-reflecting tungsten carbide blocks in a re-enactment of Harry Daghlian's 1945 experiment

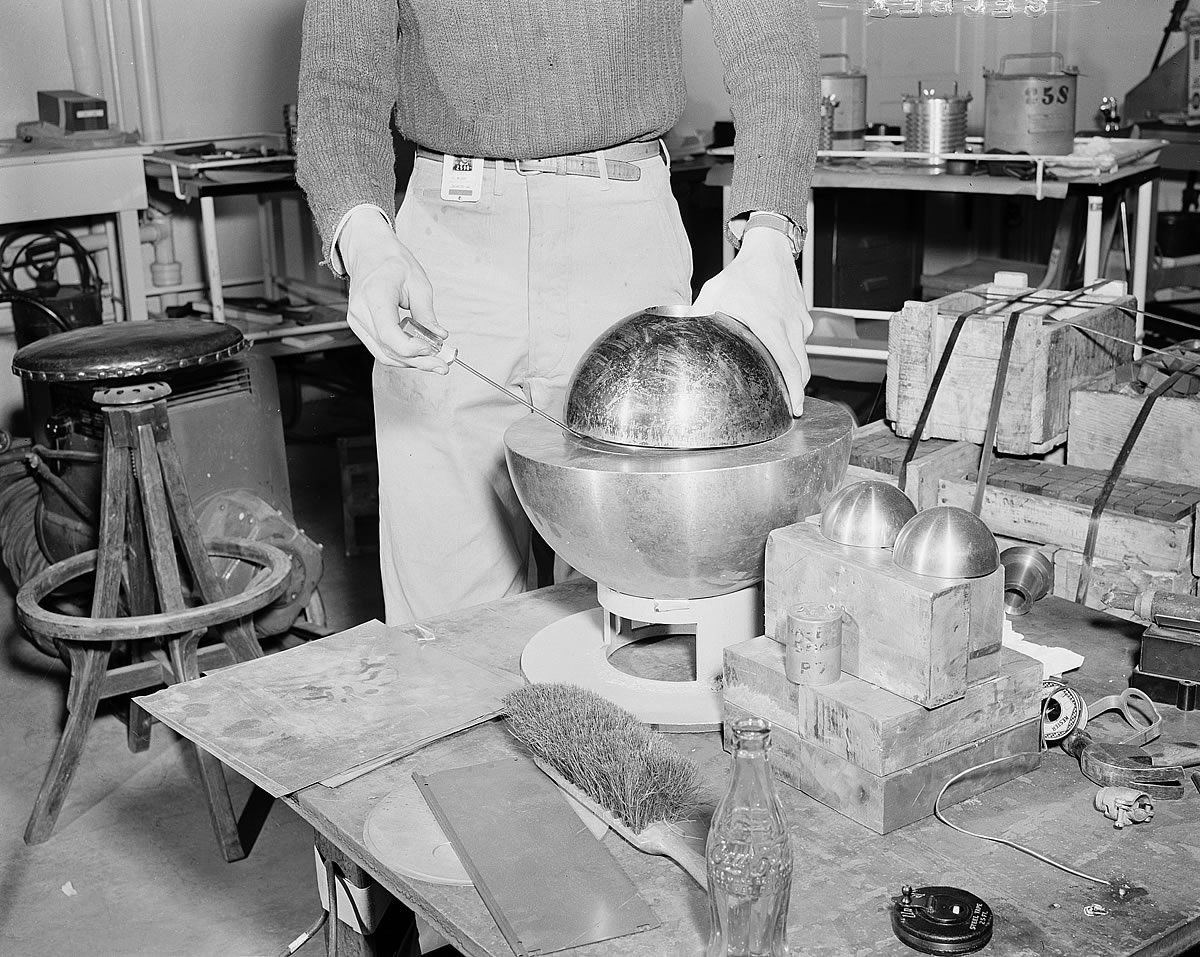
A re-creation of the Slotin incident. The plutonium "demon core" (the same as in the Daghlian incident) was inside at the time of the accident, and would not be visible.

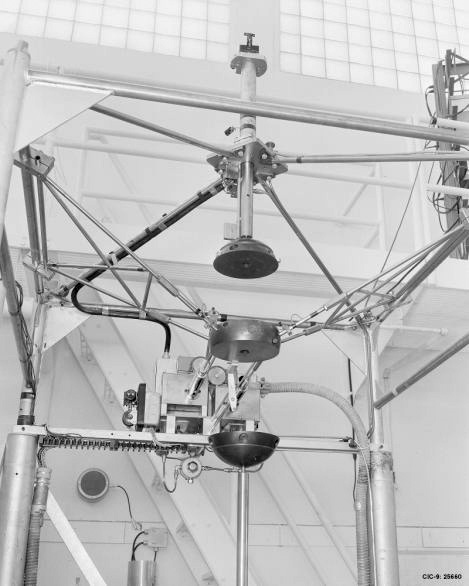
Lady Godiva assembly in the scrammed (safe) configuration

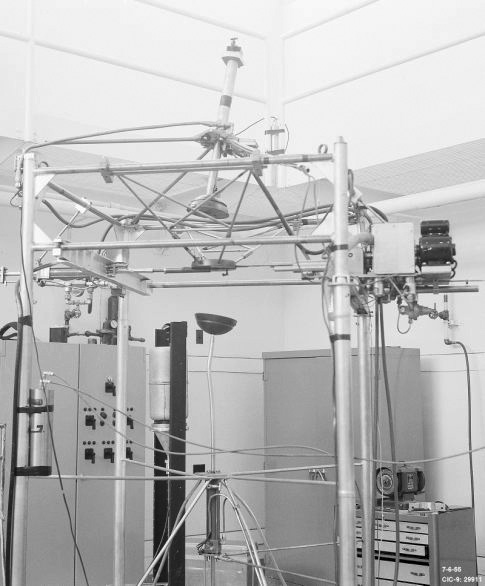
Lady Godiva assembly, with damaged supporting rods after the excursion of February 1954. Note the images are of different assemblies.

== Suspected accidents since 1999 ==
As of June 2024, there have been no confirmed criticality accidents since the 1999 Tokaimura nuclear accident. There have been suspected criticalities involved in the 2011 Fukushima nuclear accident and 2019 Nyonoksa radiation accident.

Additionally, the US State Department alleged in 2020 that Russia and possibly China have since 1996 up to 2019 carried out secret underground experiments involving supercriticality and thus a violation of the zero-yield standard, the Comprehensive Nuclear-Test-Ban Treaty, and possibly the Threshold Test Ban Treaty. Such experiments may have led to accidents similar to at Nyonoksa.

Date	Location	Description	Injuries	Fatalities	Refs
March 2011	Fukushima Daiichi Nuclear Power Plant	There was speculation although not confirmed within criticality accident experts, that Fukushima 3 suffered a criticality accident. Based on incomplete information about the 2011 Fukushima I nuclear accidents, Dr. Ferenc Dalnoki-Veress speculates that transient criticalities may have occurred there. Noting that limited, uncontrolled chain reactions might occur at Fukushima I, a spokesman for the International Atomic Energy Agency (IAEA) "emphasized that the nuclear reactors won't explode." By 23 March 2011, neutron beams had already been observed 13 times at the crippled Fukushima nuclear power plant. While a criticality accident was not believed to account for these beams, the beams could indicate nuclear fission is occurring. On 15 April, TEPCO reported that nuclear fuel had melted and fallen to the lower containment sections of three of the Fukushima I reactors, including reactor three. The melted material was not expected to breach one of the lower containers, which could cause a massive radioactivity release. Instead, the melted fuel is thought to have dispersed uniformly across the lower portions of the containers of reactors No. 1, No. 2 and No. 3, making the resumption of the fission process, known as a "recriticality", most unlikely.	24	1	
8 August 2019	Nyonoksa	The Nyonoksa explosion and radiation accident killed five military and civilian specialists off the coast of Nyonoksa, in the White Sea. Russia claimed the accident was related to an "isotope power source for a liquid-fuelled rocket engine." A US delegate told the United Nations General Assembly First Committee that a nuclear reaction occurred. According to CNBC and Reuters, it occurred during recovery of a previously tested 9M730 Burevestnik nuclear-powered cruise missile left on the seabed to cool the fission core's decay heat.	6	5	

== Observed effects ==
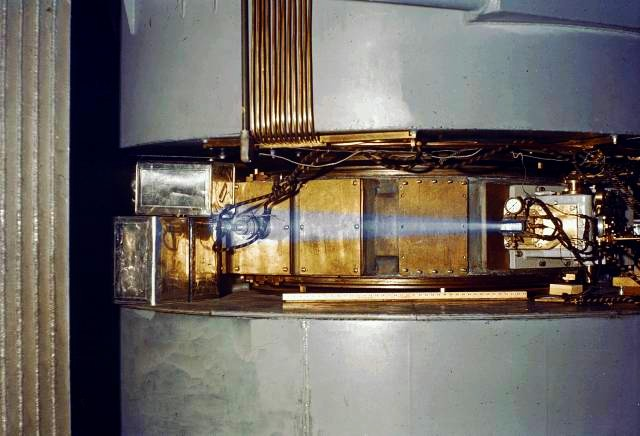
Image of a 60-inch cyclotron, circa 1939, showing an external beam of accelerated ions (perhaps protons or deuterons) ionizing the surrounding air and causing an ionized-air glow. Due to the similar mechanism of production, the blue glow is thought to resemble the "blue flash" seen by Harry Daghlian and other witnesses of criticality accidents.

=== Blue glow ===
It has been observed that many criticality accidents emit a blue flash of light.

The blue glow of a criticality accident results from the fluorescence of the excited ions, atoms and molecules of the surrounding medium falling back to unexcited states. This is also the reason electric sparks in air, including lightning, appear electric blue. The smell of ozone was said to be a sign of high ambient radioactivity by Chernobyl liquidators.

This blue flash or "blue glow" can also be attributed to Cherenkov radiation, if either water is involved in the critical system or when the blue flash is experienced by the human eye. Additionally, if ionizing radiation directly transects the vitreous humor of the eye, Cherenkov radiation can be generated and perceived as a visual blue glow/spark sensation.

It is a coincidence that the color of Cherenkov light and light emitted by ionized air are a very similar blue; their methods of production are different. Cherenkov radiation does occur in air for high-energy particles (such as particle showers from cosmic rays) but not for the lower energy charged particles emitted from nuclear decay.

=== Heat effects ===
Some people reported feeling a "heat wave" during a criticality event. It is not known whether this may be a psychosomatic reaction to the realization of what has just occurred (i.e. the high probability of inevitable impending death from a fatal radiation dose), or if it is a physical effect of heating (or non-thermal stimulation of heat sensing nerves in the skin) due to radiation emitted by the criticality event.

A review of all of the criticality accidents with eyewitness accounts indicates that the heat waves were only observed when the fluorescent blue glow (the non-Cherenkov light, see above) was also observed. This would suggest a possible relationship between the two, and indeed, one can be potentially identified. In dense air, over 30% of the emission lines from nitrogen and oxygen are in the ultraviolet range, and about 45% are in the infrared range. Only about 25% are in the visible range. Since the skin feels light (visible or otherwise) through its heating of the skin surface, it is possible that this phenomenon can explain the heat wave perceptions. However, this explanation has not been confirmed and may be inconsistent with the intensity of light reported by witnesses compared to the intensity of heat perceived. Further research is hindered by the small amount of data available from the few instances where humans have witnessed these incidents and survived long enough to provide a detailed account of their experiences and observations.

== See also ==
- Criticality (status)
- Nuclear and radiation accidents and incidents
- Nuclear criticality safety

=== In popular culture ===
- List of films about nuclear issues
- The Beginning or the End
- Day One (1989 film)
- Edge of Darkness
- Fat Man and Little Boy
- Infinity (1996 film)
- "Meridian" (Stargate SG-1)
- 1000 Ways to Die
