= Neutron reflector =

Material with the ability to reflect neutrons; used to control fission reactions

Thermal neutron flux in an unreflected and a reflected nuclear reactor

A neutron reflector is any material that reflects neutrons. This refers to elastic scattering rather than to a specular reflection. Neutron reflectors include graphite, beryllium, steel, tungsten carbide, and gold. A neutron reflector can make an otherwise subcritical mass of fissile material critical or increase the amount of nuclear fission that a critical or supercritical mass will undergo. Such an effect was exhibited twice in accidents involving the Demon Core, a subcritical plutonium pit that went critical in two separate fatal incidents when the pit's surface was momentarily surrounded by too much neutron reflective material.

== Nuclear reactors ==
In a uranium graphite chain reacting pile, the critical size may be considerably reduced by surrounding the pile with a layer of graphite, since such an envelope reflects many neutrons back into the pile.

A reflector made of a light material like graphite or beryllium will also serve as a neutron moderator reducing neutron kinetic energy, while a heavy material like lead or lead-bismuth eutectic will have less effect on neutron velocity.

In power reactors, a neutron reflector reduces the non-uniformity of the power distribution in the peripheral fuel assemblies, reduces neutron leakage and reduces a coolant flow bypass of the core. By reducing neutron leakage, the reflector increases reactivity of the core and reduces the amount of fuel necessary to maintain the reactor critical for a long period. In light-water reactors, the neutron reflector is installed for following purposes:

- The neutron flux distribution is "flattened", i.e., the ratio of the average flux to the maximum flux is increased. Therefore, reflectors reduce the non-uniformity of the power distribution.
- By increasing the neutron flux at the edge of the core, there is much better utilization in the peripheral fuel assemblies. This fuel, in the outer regions of the core, now contributes much more to the total power production.
- The neutron reflector scatters back (or reflects) into the core many neutrons that would otherwise escape. The neutrons reflected back into the core are available for chain reaction. This means that the minimum critical size of the reactor is reduced. Alternatively, if the core size is maintained, the reflector makes additional reactivity available for higher fuel burnup. The decrease in the critical size of core required is known as the reflector savings.
- Neutron reflectors reduce neutron leakage, i.e., to reduce the neutron fluence on a reactor pressure vessel.
- Neutron reflectors reduce a coolant flow bypass of a core.
- Neutron reflectors serve as a thermal and radiation shield between the core and the reactor pressure vessel.

== See also ==
- Tamper (nuclear weapon)
- Neutron scattering
- Neutron supermirror
