= Nuclear reactor physics =

Field of physics dealing with nuclear reactors

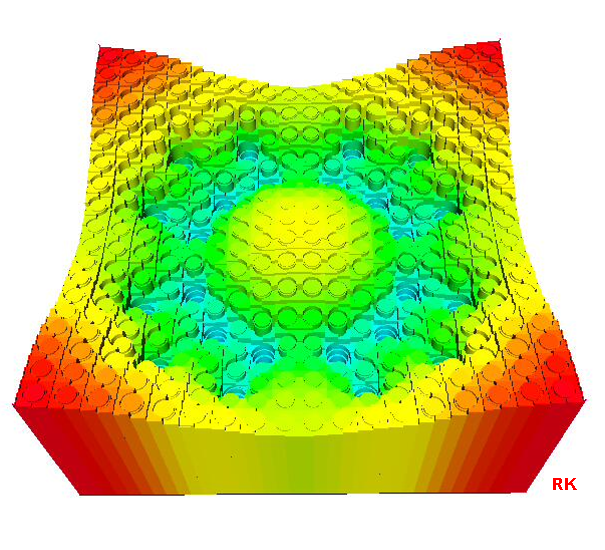
Pressurized water reactor: Projective representation of the thermal neutron flux of a fuel assembly of the 18×18 array with 300 fuel rods and 24 inserted control rods

Nuclear reactor physics is the field of physics that studies and deals with the applied study and engineering applications of chain reaction to induce a controlled rate of fission in a nuclear reactor for the production of energy.

Most nuclear reactors use a chain reaction to induce a controlled rate of nuclear fission in fissile material, releasing both energy and free neutrons. A reactor consists of an assembly of nuclear fuel (a reactor core), usually surrounded by a neutron moderator such as regular water, heavy water, graphite, or zirconium hydride, and fitted with mechanisms such as control rods which control the rate of the reaction.

== Criticality ==
In a nuclear reactor, the neutron population at any instant is a function of the rate of neutron production (due to fission processes) and the rate of neutron losses (due to non-fission absorption mechanisms and leakage from the system). When a reactor's neutron population remains steady from one generation to the next (creating as many new neutrons as are lost), the fission chain reaction is self-sustaining and the reactor's condition is referred to as "critical". When the reactor's neutron production exceeds losses, characterized by increasing power level, it is considered "supercritical", and when losses dominate, it is considered "subcritical" and exhibits decreasing power.

The "Six-factor formula" is the neutron life-cycle balance equation and takes the form $k = \eta f p \varepsilon P_{FNL} P_{TNL}$. The parameter k is known as the effective multiplication factor (also denoted by $K_{eff}$), and defined to be k = (number of neutrons in one generation)/(number of neutrons in preceding generation). As indicated by its name, the Six-factor formula accounts for six factors in the fission reaction process:

- $\eta$: Thermal fission factor
- $f$: Thermal fuel utilization factor
- $p$: Resonance escape probability
- $\varepsilon$: Fast fission factor
- $P_{FNL}$: Fast non-leakage probability
- $P_{TNL}$: Thermal non-leakage probability

When $k=1$, the reactor is said to be critical; when $k<1$, the reactor is subcritical; and when $k>1$, the reactor is supercritical.

Reactivity, expressed as either $\rho$ or $\frac{\Delta k}{k}$ and given by the equation $\rho =\frac{k-1}{k}$, is an expression of the departure from criticality. When $\rho=0$, the reactor is critical. When $\rho<0$, the reactor is subcritical. When $\rho>0$, the reactor is supercritical. Reactivity is commonly expressed in decimals, percentages, or pcm (per cent mille) of $\rho$. When reactivity is expressed in units of the delayed neutron fraction $\beta$, the unit is called the dollar.

If we write N for the number of free neutrons in a reactor core and $\tau$ for the average lifetime of each neutron (before it either escapes from the core or is absorbed by a nucleus), then the reactor will follow the differential equation (evolution equation).

$$\frac{dN}{dt} = \frac{\alpha N}{\tau}$$

where $\alpha$ is a constant of proportionality, and $dN/dt$ is the rate of change of the neutron count in the core. This type of differential equation describes exponential growth or exponential decay, depending on the sign of the constant $\alpha$, which is just the expected number of neutrons after one average neutron lifetime has elapsed:

$$\alpha = P_{impact}P_{fission} n_{avg} - P_{absorb} - P_{escape}$$

Here, $P_{impact}$ is the probability that a particular neutron will strike a fuel nucleus, $P_{fission}$ is the probability that the neutron, having struck the fuel, will cause that nucleus to undergo fission, $P_{absorb}$ is the probability that it will be absorbed by something other than fuel, and $P_{escape}$ is the probability that it will "escape" by leaving the core altogether. $n_{avg}$ is the number of neutrons produced, on average, by a fission event—it is between 2 and 3 for both ^{235}U and ^{239}Pu (e.g., for thermal neutrons in ^{235}U, $n_{avg}$ = 2.4355 ± 0.0023).

If $\alpha$ is positive, then the core is supercritical and the rate of neutron production will grow exponentially until some other effect stops the growth. If $\alpha$ is negative, then the core is "subcritical" and the number of free neutrons in the core will shrink exponentially until it reaches an equilibrium at zero (or the background level from spontaneous fission). If $\alpha$ is exactly zero, then the reactor is critical and its output does not vary in time ($dN/dt = 0$, from above).

Nuclear reactors are engineered to reduce $P_{escape}$ and $P_{absorb}$. Small, compact structures reduce the probability of direct escape by minimizing the surface area of the core, and some materials (such as graphite) can reflect some neutrons back into the core, further reducing $P_{escape}$.

The probability of fission, $P_{fission}$, depends on the nuclear physics of the fuel, and is often expressed as a cross section. Reactors are usually controlled by adjusting $P_{absorb}$. Control rods made of a strongly neutron-absorbent material such as cadmium or boron can be inserted into the core: any neutron that happens to impact the control rod is lost from the chain reaction, reducing $\alpha$. $P_{absorb}$ is also controlled by the recent history of the reactor core itself (see below).

=== Starter sources ===
The mere fact that an assembly is supercritical does not guarantee that it contains any free neutrons at all. At least one neutron is required to "strike" a chain reaction, and if the spontaneous fission rate is sufficiently low it may take a long time (in ^{235}U reactors, as long as many minutes) before a chance neutron encounter starts a chain reaction even if the reactor is supercritical. Most nuclear reactors include a "starter" neutron source that ensures there are always a few free neutrons in the reactor core, so that a chain reaction will begin immediately when the core is made critical. A common type of startup neutron source is a mixture of an alpha particle emitter such as ^{241}Am (americium-241) with a lightweight isotope such as ^{9}Be (beryllium-9).

The primary sources described above have to be used with fresh reactor cores. For operational reactors, secondary sources are used; most often a combination of antimony with beryllium. Antimony becomes activated in the reactor and produces high-energy gamma photons, which produce photoneutrons from beryllium.

Uranium-235 undergoes a small rate of natural spontaneous fission, so there are always some neutrons being produced even in a fully shutdown reactor. When the control rods are withdrawn and criticality is approached the number increases because the absorption of neutrons is being progressively reduced, until at criticality the chain reaction becomes self-sustaining. Note that while a neutron source is provided in the reactor, this is not essential to start the chain reaction, its main purpose is to give a shutdown neutron population which is detectable by instruments and so make the approach to critical more observable. The reactor will go critical at the same control rod position whether a source is loaded or not.

Once the chain reaction is begun, the primary starter source may be removed from the core to prevent damage from the high neutron flux in the operating reactor core; the secondary sources usually remain in situ to provide a background reference level for control of criticality.

== Subcritical multiplication ==
Even in a subcritical assembly such as a shut-down reactor core, any stray neutron that happens to be present in the core (for example from spontaneous fission of the fuel, from radioactive decay of fission products, or from a neutron source) will trigger an exponentially decaying chain reaction. Although the chain reaction is not self-sustaining, it acts as a multiplier that increases the equilibrium number of neutrons in the core. This subcritical multiplication effect can be used in two ways: as a probe of how close a core is to criticality, and as a way to generate fission power without the risks associated with a critical mass.

If $k$ is the neutron multiplication factor of a subcritical core and $S_0$ is the number of neutrons coming per generation in the reactor from an external source, then at the instant when the neutron source is switched on, the number of neutrons in the core will be $S_0$. After 1 generation, these neutrons will produce $k \times S_0$ neutrons in the reactor and the reactor will have a totality of $k \times S_0 + S_0$ neutrons considering the newly entered neutrons in the reactor. Similarly after 2 generations, the number of neutrons produced in the reactor will be $k \times (k \times S_0 + S_0) + S_0$ and so on. This process will continue and after a long enough time, the number of neutrons in the reactor will be,

$$S_0 +k \times S_0 + k \times k \times S_0 + \ldots$$

This series will converge because for the subcritical core, $0 < k < 1$. So the number of neutrons in the reactor will be simply,

$$\frac{S_0}{1-k}$$

The fraction $\frac{1}{1-k}$ is called subcritical multiplication factor (α).

As a measurement technique, subcritical multiplication was used during the Manhattan Project in early experiments to determine the minimum critical masses of ^{235}U and of ^{239}Pu. It is still used today to calibrate the controls for nuclear reactors during startup, as many effects (discussed in the following sections) can change the required control settings to achieve criticality in a reactor. As a power-generating technique, subcritical multiplication allows generation of nuclear power for fission where a critical assembly is undesirable for safety or other reasons. A subcritical assembly together with a neutron source can serve as a steady source of heat to generate power from fission.

Including the effect of an external neutron source ("external" to the fission process, not physically external to the core), one can write a modified evolution equation:

$$\frac{dN}{dt} = \frac{\alpha N}{t} + R_{ext}$$

where $R_{ext}$ is the rate at which the external source injects neutrons into the core in neutrons/Δt. In equilibrium, the core is not changing and dN/dt is zero, so the equilibrium number of neutrons is given by:

$$N = -\frac{t R_{ext}}{\alpha}$$

If the core is subcritical, then $\alpha$ is negative so there is an equilibrium with a positive number of neutrons. If the core is close to criticality, then $\alpha$ is very small and thus the final number of neutrons can be made arbitrarily large.

== Neutron moderators ==
To improve $P_{fission}$ and enable a chain reaction, natural or low enrichment uranium-fueled reactors must include a neutron moderator that interacts with newly produced fast neutrons from fission events to reduce their kinetic energy from several MeV to thermal energies of less than one eV, making them more likely to induce fission. This is because ^{235}U has a larger cross section for slow neutrons, and also because ^{238}U is much less likely to absorb a thermal neutron than a freshly produced neutron from fission.

Neutron moderators are thus materials that slow down neutrons. Neutrons are most effectively slowed by colliding with the nucleus of a light atom, hydrogen being the lightest of all. To be effective, moderator materials must thus contain light elements with atomic nuclei that tend to scatter neutrons on impact rather than absorb them. In addition to hydrogen, beryllium and carbon atoms are also suited to the job of moderating or slowing down neutrons.

Hydrogen moderators include water (H_{2}O), heavy water (D_{2}O), and zirconium hydride (ZrH_{2}), all of which work because a hydrogen nucleus has nearly the same mass as a free neutron: neutron-H_{2}O or neutron-ZrH_{2} impacts excite rotational modes of the molecules (spinning them around). Deuterium nuclei (in heavy water) absorb kinetic energy less well than do light hydrogen nuclei, but they are much less likely to absorb the impacting neutron. Water or heavy water have the advantage of being transparent liquids, so that, in addition to shielding and moderating a reactor core, they permit direct viewing of the core in operation and can also serve as a working fluid for heat transfer.

Carbon in the form of graphite has been widely used as a moderator. It was used in Chicago Pile-1, the world's first man-made critical assembly, and was commonplace in early reactor designs including the Soviet RBMK nuclear power plants such as the Chernobyl plant.

=== Moderators and reactor design ===
The amount and nature of neutron moderation affects reactor controllability and hence safety. Because moderators both slow and absorb neutrons, there is an optimum amount of moderator to include in a given geometry of reactor core. Less moderation reduces the effectiveness by reducing the $P_{fission}$ term in the evolution equation, and more moderation reduces the effectiveness by increasing the $P_{escape}$ term.

Most moderators become less effective with increasing temperature, so under-moderated reactors are stable against changes in temperature in the reactor core: if the core overheats, then the quality of the moderator is reduced and the reaction tends to slow down (there is a "negative temperature coefficient" in the reactivity of the core). Water is an extreme case: in extreme heat, it can boil, producing effective voids in the reactor core without destroying the physical structure of the core; this tends to shut down the reaction and reduce the possibility of a fuel meltdown. Over-moderated reactors are unstable against changes in temperature (there is a "positive temperature coefficient" in the reactivity of the core), and so are less inherently safe than under-moderated cores.

Some reactors use a combination of moderator materials. For example, TRIGA type research reactors use ZrH_{2} moderator mixed with the ^{235}U fuel, an H_{2}O-filled core, and C (graphite) moderator and reflector blocks around the periphery of the core.

== Delayed neutrons and controllability ==
Fission reactions and subsequent neutron escape happen very quickly; this is important for nuclear weapons, where the objective is to make a nuclear pit release as much energy as possible before it physically explodes. Most neutrons emitted by fission events are prompt: they are emitted effectively instantaneously. Once emitted, the average neutron lifetime ($\tau$) in a typical core is on the order of a millisecond, so if the exponential factor $\alpha$ is as small as 0.01, then in one second the reactor power will vary by a factor of (1 + 0.01)^{1000}, or more than ten thousand. Nuclear weapons are engineered to maximize the power growth rate, with lifetimes well under a millisecond and exponential factors close to 2; but such rapid variation would render it practically impossible to control the reaction rates in a nuclear reactor.

Fortunately, the effective neutron lifetime is much longer than the average lifetime of a single neutron in the core. About 0.65% of the neutrons produced by ^{235}U fission, and about 0.20% of the neutrons produced by ^{239}Pu fission, are not produced immediately, but rather are emitted from an excited nucleus after a further decay step. In this step, further radioactive decay of some of the fission products (almost always negative beta decay), is followed by immediate neutron emission from the excited daughter product, with an average life time of the beta decay (and thus the neutron emission) of about 15 seconds. These so-called delayed neutrons increase the effective average lifetime of neutrons in the core, to nearly 0.1 seconds, so that a core with $\alpha$ of 0.01 would increase in one second by only a factor of (1 + 0.01)^{10}, or about 1.1: a 10% increase. This is a controllable rate of change.

Most nuclear reactors are hence operated in a prompt subcritical, delayed critical condition: the prompt neutrons alone are not sufficient to sustain a chain reaction, but the delayed neutrons make up the small difference required to keep the reaction going. This has effects on how reactors are controlled: when a small amount of control rod is slid into or out of the reactor core, the power level changes at first very rapidly due to prompt subcritical multiplication and then more gradually, following the exponential growth or decay curve of the delayed critical reaction. Furthermore, increases in reactor power can be performed at any desired rate simply by pulling out a sufficient length of control rod. However, without addition of a neutron poison or active neutron-absorber, decreases in fission rate are limited in speed, because even if the reactor is taken deeply subcritical to stop prompt fission neutron production, delayed neutrons are produced after ordinary beta decay of fission products already in place, and this decay-production of neutrons cannot be changed.

The rate of change of reactor power is determined by the reactor period $T$, which is related to the reactivity $\rho$ through the Inhour equation.

== Kinetics ==
The kinetics of the reactor is described by the balance equations of neutrons and nuclei (fissile, fission products). In the point kinetics approximation the spatial distribution of the flux is assumed to keep its shape, so the time dependence reduces to ordinary differential equations for the neutron population $n(t)$ and the concentrations $C_i(t)$ of the delayed neutron precursors.

$$\frac{dn(t)}{dt} = S(t) + \frac{\rho - \beta}{\Lambda} n(t) + \sum_{i} \lambda_i C_i(t)$$

$$\frac{dC_i(t)}{dt} = \frac{\beta_i}{\Lambda} n(t) - \lambda_i C_i(t)$$

Here $\rho$ is the reactivity, $\beta = \sum_i \beta_i$ is the total delayed neutron fraction, $\Lambda$ is the prompt neutron generation time, $\lambda_i$ is the decay constant of precursor group $i$, and $S(t)$ is an external neutron source. With no source, the steady state solution of these equations requires the same criticality condition as the static balance.

== Reactor poisons ==
Any nuclide that strongly absorbs neutrons is called a reactor poison, because it tends to shut down (poison) an ongoing fission chain reaction. Some reactor poisons are deliberately inserted into fission reactor cores to control the reaction; boron or cadmium control rods are the best example. Many reactor poisons are produced by the fission process itself, and buildup of neutron-absorbing fission products affects both the fuel economics and the controllability of nuclear reactors.

=== Long-lived poisons and fuel reprocessing ===
In practice, buildup of reactor poisons in nuclear fuel is what determines the lifetime of nuclear fuel in a reactor: long before all possible fissions have taken place, buildup of long-lived neutron absorbing fission products damps out the chain reaction. This is the reason that nuclear reprocessing is a useful activity: spent nuclear fuel contains about 96% of the original fissionable material present in newly manufactured nuclear fuel. Chemical separation of the fission products restores the nuclear fuel so that it can be used again.

Nuclear reprocessing is useful economically because chemical separation is much simpler to accomplish than the difficult isotope separation required to prepare nuclear fuel from natural uranium ore, so that in principle chemical separation yields more generated energy for less effort than mining, purifying, and isotopically separating new uranium ore. In practice, both the difficulty of handling the highly radioactive fission products and other political concerns make fuel reprocessing a contentious subject. One such concern is the fact that spent uranium nuclear fuel contains significant quantities of ^{239}Pu, a prime ingredient in nuclear weapons (see breeder reactor).

=== Short-lived poisons and controllability ===
Short-lived reactor poisons in fission products strongly affect how nuclear reactors can operate. Unstable fission product nuclei transmute into many different elements (secondary fission products) as they undergo a decay chain to a stable isotope. The most important such element is xenon, because the isotope ^{135}Xe, a secondary fission product with a half-life of about 9 hours, is an extremely strong neutron absorber. In an operating reactor, each nucleus of ^{135}Xe becomes ^{136}Xe (which may later sustain beta decay) by neutron capture almost as soon as it is created, so that there is no buildup in the core. However, when a reactor shuts down, the level of ^{135}Xe builds up in the core for about 9 hours before beginning to decay. The result is that, about 6–8 hours after a reactor is shut down, it can become physically impossible to restart the chain reaction until the ^{135}Xe has had a chance to decay over the next several hours. This temporary state, which may last several days and prevent restart, is called the iodine pit or xenon-poisoning. It is one reason why nuclear power reactors are usually operated at an even power level around the clock.

^{135}Xe buildup in a reactor core makes it extremely dangerous to operate the reactor a few hours after it has been shut down. Because the ^{135}Xe absorbs neutrons strongly, starting a reactor in a high-Xe condition requires pulling the control rods out of the core much farther than normal. However, if the reactor does achieve criticality, then the neutron flux in the core becomes high and ^{135}Xe is destroyed rapidly—this has the same effect as very rapidly removing a great length of control rod from the core, and can cause the reaction to grow too rapidly or even become prompt critical.

^{135}Xe played a large part in the Chernobyl accident: about eight hours after a scheduled maintenance shutdown, workers tried to bring the reactor to a zero power critical condition to test a control circuit. Since the core was loaded with ^{135}Xe from the previous day's power generation, it was necessary to withdraw more control rods to achieve this. As a result, the overdriven reaction grew rapidly and uncontrollably, leading to steam explosion in the core, and violent destruction of the facility.

== Uranium enrichment ==
While many fissionable isotopes exist in nature, one useful fissile isotope found in viable quantities is ^{235}U. About 0.7% of the uranium in most ores is the 235 isotope, and about 99.3% is the non-fissile 238 isotope. For most uses as a nuclear fuel, uranium must be enriched - purified so that it contains a higher percentage of ^{235}U. Because ^{238}U absorbs fast neutrons, the critical mass needed to sustain a chain reaction increases as the ^{238}U content increases, reaching infinity at 94% ^{238}U (6% ^{235}U).

Concentrations lower than 6% ^{235}U cannot go fast critical, though they are usable in a nuclear reactor with a neutron moderator. A nuclear weapon primary stage using uranium uses HEU enriched to ~90% ^{235}U, though the secondary stage often uses lower enrichments. Nuclear reactors with light water moderation require at least some enrichment of ^{235}U. Nuclear reactors with heavy water or graphite moderation can operate with natural uranium, eliminating altogether the need for enrichment and preventing the fuel from being useful for nuclear weapons; the CANDU power reactors used in Canadian power plants are an example of this type.

Americium and other minor actinides have also been studied as candidates for future reactor fuels, but their physicochemical and radiological properties make handling considerably more complicated than for standard uranium oxide or mixed oxide fuel. Because the chemical properties of ^{235}U and ^{238}U are nearly identical, physical processes such as gaseous diffusion, gas centrifuge, laser, or mass spectrometry must be used for isotopic separation based on small differences in mass. Because enrichment is the main technical hurdle to production of nuclear fuel and simple nuclear weapons, enrichment technology is politically sensitive.

== Oklo: a natural nuclear reactor ==
Modern deposits of uranium contain only up to ~0.7% ^{235}U (and ~99.3% ^{238}U), which is not enough to sustain a chain reaction moderated by ordinary water. But ^{235}U has a much shorter half-life (700 million years) than ^{238}U (4.5 billion years), so in the distant past the percentage of ^{235}U was much higher. About two billion years ago, a water-saturated uranium deposit (in what is now the Oklo mine in Gabon, West Africa) underwent a naturally occurring chain reaction that was moderated by groundwater and, presumably, controlled by the negative void coefficient as the water boiled from the heat of the reaction. Uranium from the Oklo mine is about 50% depleted compared to other locations: it is only about 0.3% to 0.7% ^{235}U; and the ore contains traces of stable daughters of long-decayed fission products.

== See also ==
- Critical mass
- List of nuclear reactors
- Nuclear physics
- Nuclear fission
- Nuclear fusion
- Void coefficient
