= Dollar (reactivity) =

Unit of reactivity for a nuclear reactor

A dollar is a unit of reactivity for a nuclear reactor, calibrated to the interval between the conditions of criticality and prompt criticality. Prompt criticality will result in an extremely rapid power rise, with the resultant destruction of the reactor, unless it is specifically designed to tolerate the condition. A cent is 1/100 of a dollar. In nuclear reactor physics discussions, the symbols are often appended to the end of the numerical value of reactivity, such as 3.48$ or 21 ¢.

Reactivity (denoted ρ or ΔK/K) is related to the effective neutron multiplication factor (k_{eff}), the average number of all neutrons from one fission that cause another fission.

ρ = (k_{eff} - 1)/k_{eff}

But in nuclear physics, it is useful to talk about the reactivity contributed by just the prompt neutrons. This is the reactivity in dollars or cents.

Reactivity in its most general sense would not be measured in dollars or cents. This is because k_{eff} measures the total value of reactivity, a summation of the reactivity of both the prompt and delayed neutrons. However, reactivity in dollars is dependent on the delayed neutron fraction (β_{eff}).

Reactivity in dollars = ρ/β_{eff}

Reactivity in cents = 100 x (ρ/β_{eff})

Here β_{eff} is the effective delayed neutron fraction, the value actually used in calculations. A fission-rate-weighted average of the fractions of the individual nuclides is not enough on its own: delayed neutrons are born slower, so fewer of them are lost to fast leakage in a thermal reactor and each one counts for more toward the chain reaction, which leaves the effective value slightly different from the average.

Because the delayed neutron fraction depends on the fuel, so does the dollar: one dollar is about 0.0065 of reactivity in a uranium-235 core, but only about 0.0026 in a uranium-233 core and about 0.002 in a plutonium-239 core.

When certain components or parameters change the reactivity of a nuclear reactor, the changes may be calculated as their reactivity worth. A control rod and a chemical reactor poison both have negative reactivity worth, while the addition of a neutron moderator would generally have a positive reactivity worth. Reactivity worth can be measured in dollars or cents. During the design and testing of a nuclear reactor, each component will be scrutinized to determine its reactivity worth, often at different temperatures, pressures, and control rod heights. The worth changes fastest near the core midplane, where the flux peaks, which makes the calibration curve steepest in the middle and flat at both ends. For example, the burning of reactor poisons is important to the lifespan of the reactor core, since their reactivity worth decreases as the core ages.

== Reactivity in general ==
Relative neutron flux versus time after a step reactivity insertion: the flux rises slowly below one dollar and quickly shoots up near prompt critical.

Reactivity (ρ) is dimensionless, but may be modified to make it less cumbersome. Since reactivity is often a small number, it may be denoted in percent, i.e. %ΔK/K. Thus, a reactivity of 0.02 ΔK/K would be reported as 2 %ΔK/K. A nuclear reactor with a 2% reactivity is supercritical. A negative sign would indicate that it is subcritical.

The per cent mille (pcm) is used for even finer-grained measurements of reactivity, amounting to one-thousanth of a percent. Likewise, an InHour (inverse hour) is another small measurement of reactivity that takes into account the time of multiplication.

The unitless, pcm, percent, and inverse-time-based versions of reactivity can all be converted to dollars with the formula above and the Inhour equation. From there, the startup rate (SUR), reactor period and doubling time of the reactor can be calculated.

== Meaning and use ==
Each nuclear fission produces several neutrons that can be absorbed, escape from the reactor, or go on to cause more fissions in a nuclear chain reaction. When an average of one neutron from each fission goes on to cause another fission, the reactor is "critical", and the chain reaction proceeds at a constant power level. Adding reactivity at this point will make the reactor supercritical, while subtracting reactivity will make it subcritical.

Most neutrons produced in fission are "prompt", i.e., created with the fission products in less than about 10 nanoseconds (a "shake" of time), but certain fission products produce additional neutrons when they decay up to several minutes after their creation by fission. These delayed-release neutrons, a tiny fraction of the total, are key to stable nuclear reactor control. Without delayed neutrons, a reactor that was just barely supercritical would present a significant control problem, as reactor power would increase exponentially on millisecond or even microsecond timescales – much too fast to be controlled with current or near-future technology.

Such a rapid power increase can also happen in a real reactor when the chain reaction is sustained without the help of the delayed neutrons. Suppose that the delayed neutron fraction for a particular reactor is 0.00700, or 0.700%. Suppose also that the reactor is highly supercritical and ΔK/K is 0.00700.

Reactivity in dollars = ρ/β_{eff} = 0.007/0.007 = 1$

If the excess reactivity of a reactor is 1 dollar (1$) or more, the reactor is prompt critical. Prompt neutrons are so numerous that the production of delayed neutrons is no longer needed to sustain the reaction. At or above 1$, the chain reaction proceeds without them, and reactor power increases so fast that no conventional controlling mechanism can stop it. A reactor in such a state will produce a reactor excursion and could have a reactor accident.

An extreme example of a prompt critical reaction is an exploding nuclear weapon, where considerable design effort goes into keeping the core constrained in a prompt critical state for as long as possible until the greatest attainable percentage of material has fissioned.

The SPERT Reactors studied reactors close to the point of prompt critical to answer questions about the reactor physics of pressurized water and boiling water reactors during supercritical operation. At the SPERT reactors, reactivity could be added by a programmed gradual insertion (ramp addition of reactivity) or by ejecting a transient control rod out the bottom of the core (step addition of reactivity).

Reactor period versus reactivity in dollars: the period is long below one dollar and quickly shortens near prompt critical.

By definition, reactivity of zero dollars is just barely on the edge of criticality using both prompt and delayed neutrons. A reactivity less than zero dollars is subcritical; the power level will decrease exponentially and a sustained chain reaction will not occur. One dollar is defined as the threshold between delayed and prompt criticality. At prompt criticality, on average each fission will cause exactly one additional fission via prompt neutrons, and the delayed neutrons will then increase power. Any reactivity above 1$ is supercritical and power will increase exponentially, but between 0$ and 1$ the power rise will be slow enough to be safely controlled with mechanical and intrinsic material properties (control rod movements, density of coolant, moderator properties, steam formation) because the chain reaction partly depends on the delayed neutrons. A power reactor operating at steady state (constant power) will therefore have an average reactivity of 0$, with small fluctuations above and below this value.

Reactivity can also be expressed in relative terms, such as "5 cents above prompt critical".

While power reactors are carefully designed and operated to avoid prompt criticality under all circumstances, with reactivity changes normally limited to about ±20 cents in normal operation, many small research or "zero power" reactors are designed to be intentionally placed into prompt criticality (greater than 1$) with complete safety by rapidly withdrawing their control rods. Their fuel elements are designed so that as they heat up, reactivity is automatically and quickly reduced through effects such as doppler broadening and thermal expansion. Such reactors can be "pulsed" to very high power levels (e.g., several GW) for a few milliseconds, after which reactivity automatically drops to 0$ and a relatively low and constant power level (e.g. several hundred kW) is maintained until shut down manually by reinserting the control rods. The Pennsylvania State University Breazeale reactor is another such pulsing reactor: it is pulsed by ejecting a control rod to add 2.72 times the delayed neutron fraction, reaching powers several thousand times its steady-state value.

Subcritical reactors, which thus far have only been built at laboratory scale, would constantly run in "negative dollars" (most likely a few cents below [delayed] critical) with the "missing" neutrons provided by an external neutron source, e.g. spallation driven by a particle accelerator in an accelerator-driven subcritical reactor.

== History ==
According to Alvin Weinberg and Eugene Wigner, Louis Slotin was the first to propose the name "dollar" for the interval of reactivity between barely critical and prompt criticality, and "cents" for the decimal fraction of the dollar.
