= Reactimeter =

Nuclear reactor reactivity meter

A reactimeter (also called a reactivity meter) is a device that determines the reactivity of a reactor by solving the point-kinetics equations inversely.

== Principle ==
The point-kinetics equations describe how the reactor power changes after a change in reactivity, so by measuring power and solving them inversely the reactivity can be obtained. Because it doesn't have the assumptions and requirements of the inhour equation (step insertion and waiting for the delayed neutrons) it works in power reactors, where reactivity feedback is important. The signals the reactimeter gets from the nuclear power chambers are used in a point-kinetics (zero-dimensional) model that computes the reactor doubling time. Inverse kinetics works in a subcritical core as well as in a critical one, and the reactivity can be measured without shutting the reactor down.

== Implementation ==
Historically in the French 900 MWe plants the reactimeter used analogue computers known as PAGELS. It had a grid for each isotope processed (uranium-235, uranium-238 and plutonium-239), each holding six resistor-capacitor dipoles connected in parallel for the six groups of delayed neutrons. When the doubling time computed by the reactimeter fell below the threshold (20 s), the system automatically tripped the reactor.

Digital reactimeters are also used to record the flux variations measured by an external power chamber during the movement of a control-rod bank, so the integral worth of the rod bank can be calculated. In fast-neutron reactors, control-rod worth is measured by following the subcritical flux over time with kinetic techniques, one implementation of which is the reactimeter.

== Limitations ==
The reactivity given by a reactimeter depends on the position of the detector relative to the place where the perturbation is introduced. A quasi-static algorithm can correct the detector signal for the change of the flux shape before it is used as the amplitude function of the reactor. That change of flux shape complicates the reading when the reactimeter is used to measure rod-bank worth: inserting the bank immediately redistributes the prompt neutrons, while the spatial distribution of the delayed neutrons shifts out of phase with the prompt flux. The same geometry problem appears in a source- or accelerator-driven subcritical system, where the reactivity obtained also depends on the relation between the position of the detector and that of the time-dependent source. The calculation also needs the external neutron source term as an input. At high power with no external source present it can be ignored, but at low power and in subcritical states it becomes significant and is difficult to determine. The response time of the detector may also be too slow for the plain inverse kinetics method, in which case an online reactivity meter is designed around a more robust form of it.
