= Point kinetics equations =

Model in nuclear reactor dynamics

Point kinetics equations (also called the point reactor kinetics equations) are a set of differential equations used in nuclear reactor dynamics to describe how the neutron population of a reactor changes with time, ignoring spatial variations. In the point kinetics model, the neutron flux is assumed to have a fixed spatial shape, so the equations track only the time-dependent neutron population and the concentrations of the delayed-neutron precursors. The equations are used to analyze reactor startups, shutdowns, and accidental power transients.

== Derivation ==
The point kinetics model is obtained from the time-dependent neutron diffusion equation. The neutron flux is assumed to remain proportional to a fixed spatial shape during a transient, so that it can be written as the product of a shape function and a time-dependent amplitude (the fundamental mode assumption). Removing the spatial dependence in this way reduces the problem to a system of ordinary differential equations in time alone. Strictly the shape used is the fundamental mode of the perturbed core; the critical-core shape holds only close to critical or on the asymptotic period.

== Standard form ==
The standard form of the point kinetics equations uses six groups of delayed-neutron precursors:

$\frac{dn}{dt} = \frac{\rho(t)-\beta}{\Lambda}n(t) + \sum_{i=1}^{6}\lambda_i C_i(t),$

$\frac{dC_i}{dt} = \frac{\beta_i}{\Lambda}n(t) - \lambda_i C_i(t) \qquad (i = 1, \dots, 6).$

where $n(t)$ is the neutron population (proportional to reactor power), $\rho(t)$ is the reactivity, $\Lambda$ is the prompt neutron generation time, $\beta$ is the total delayed neutron fraction, $\beta_i$ and $\lambda_i$ are the delayed neutron fraction and decay constant of the $i$-th precursor group, and $C_i(t)$ is the concentration of that group. This form omits an external source term; with a source present a term $S(t)$ is added to the neutron equation, as in subcritical multiplication.

Note that $\beta$, $\beta_i$, $\Lambda$ and $\rho$ in these equations are the effective (adjoint weighted) kinetics parameters, which account for the different fission effectiveness of the lower energy delayed neutrons; $\beta$ in these equations is the effective delayed neutron fraction $\beta_{\mathrm{eff}}$. $\beta_{\mathrm{eff}}$ is usually a few percent larger than the physical delayed neutron yield $\beta$ in large thermal reactors (even larger in small leaky cores, and smaller in fast reactors) and depends on the reactor size and neutron spectrum.

The delayed neutrons are traditionally represented by six groups whose yields and decay constants are empirical parameters obtained from least-squares fits to experimental measurements. For uranium-235 fission the total delayed neutron fraction is $\beta \approx 0.0065.$

Six-group delayed neutron data for uranium-235 fission
Group	Half-life $T_{1/2}$ (s)	Relative yield $\beta_i/\beta$
1	54.51	0.038
2	21.84	0.213
3	6.00	0.188
4	2.23	0.407
5	0.496	0.128
6	0.179	0.026

The group decay constants follow from $\lambda_i = \ln 2 / T_{1/2}$ and range from about 0.013 s^{−1} (55-second group) to about 3.9 s^{−1} (0.18-second group).

== Role of delayed neutrons ==
The prompt neutron lifetime in a thermal reactor is on the order of 10^{−4} seconds, and is shorter (around 10^{−8}–10^{−6} s) in fast reactors. The generation time is not itself the reactor's power-growth time: the reactor period depends on the reactivity and the reactor's kinetic parameters, and for a small positive reactivity it is approximately the mean neutron lifetime, including the effect of the delayed neutrons, divided by the reactivity. If only prompt neutrons were present, even a very small reactivity insertion would give a very short period: for example, with a prompt neutron lifetime of 2×10^{−5} s, a 10 pcm insertion would give a period of only 0.2 s, and the power would rise by a factor of $e^{50}$ in 10 s. Delayed neutrons lengthen the mean neutron lifetime, to about 0.085 s in that same example; for the same 10 pcm insertion the period is then about 850 s, slow enough for control systems such as control rods to respond.

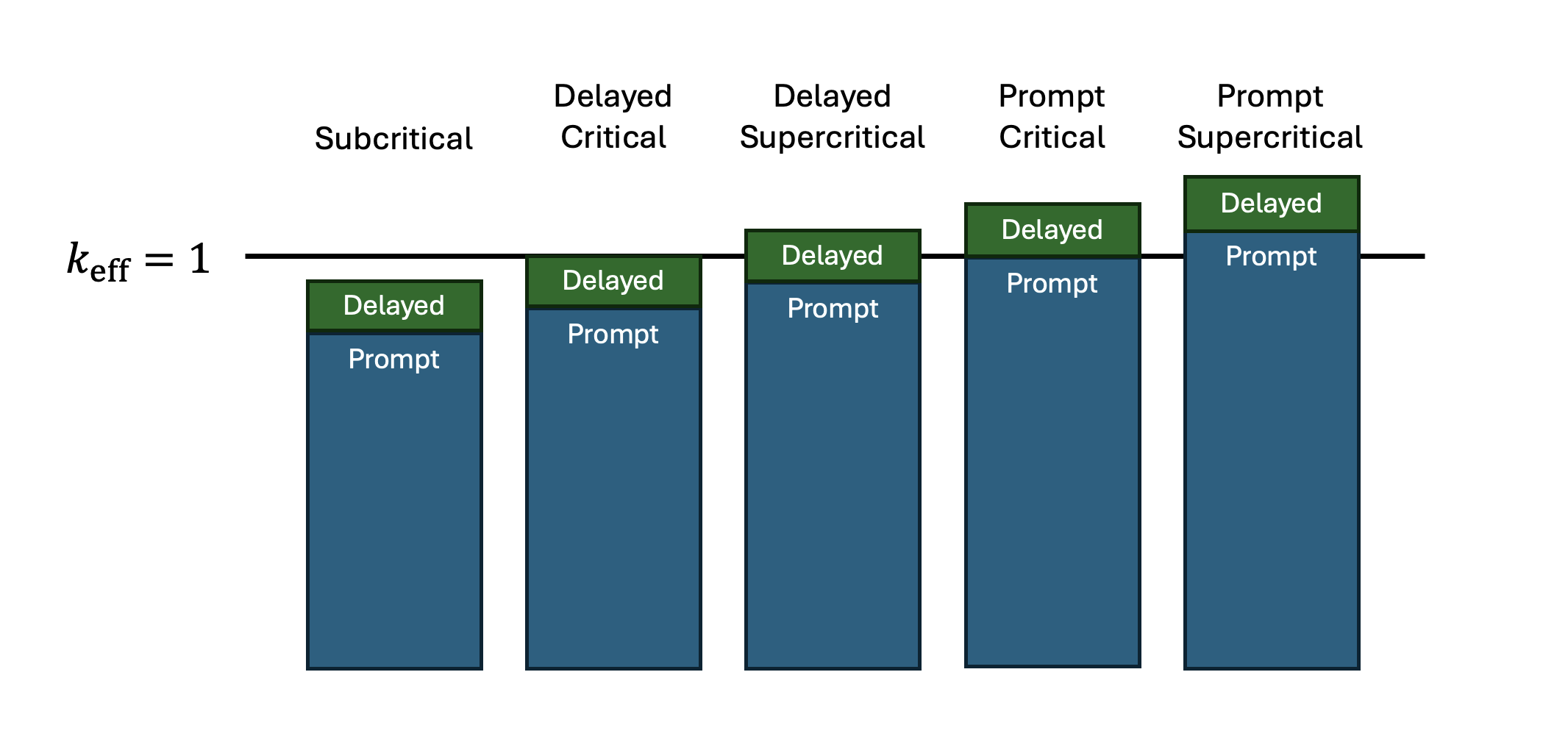
Diagram explaining criticality types.

Depending on where the reactivity $\rho$ lies relative to $\beta_{\mathrm{eff}}$, the effective delayed neutron fraction $\beta$ defined in the standard form section, the following regimes are distinguished:

- Subcritical ($\rho < 0$): the chain reaction is not self-sustaining; without a neutron source the population decays in time, while with an external or internal neutron source present the reactor is in the state called subcritical multiplication.
- Delayed critical ($\rho = 0$): prompt and delayed neutrons together sustain the chain reaction, so the population is constant in time at equilibrium.
- Delayed supercritical ($0 < \rho < \beta_{\mathrm{eff}}$): the population grows, with delayed neutrons essential to sustaining the chain reaction. This allows slower, controllable power changes, although the growth can become dangerously rapid as $\rho$ approaches $\beta_{\mathrm{eff}}$.
- Prompt critical ($\rho = \beta_{\mathrm{eff}}$): prompt neutrons alone exactly balance neutron losses, making the chain reaction self-sustaining without delayed neutrons.
- Prompt supercritical ($\rho > \beta_{\mathrm{eff}}$): prompt neutrons alone support a growing chain reaction, and the neutron number rises on the prompt-neutron timescale, allowing very rapid power increases.

The distinction between the last two states follows from the prompt-neutron balance. Power reactors are designed for operation under conditions in which delayed neutrons make the chain reaction controllable, and safety systems prevent prompt criticality; a specially designed pulsed test reactor is an exception, since it is briefly made prompt supercritical to produce a short neutron burst limited by prompt negative feedback.

== Approximate solutions ==
Both approximations reduce the six-group system to fewer equations. The prompt jump approximation describes the first moments of a transient, while the precursor concentrations have not yet had time to change; the one-delayed-group model then carries the same transient further, with the six groups replaced by one effective group.

=== Prompt jump approximation ===
For a step insertion of reactivity $\rho < \beta$ from a critical state, the power first changes sharply on the prompt timescale (the precursors cannot respond that quickly) and then follows a slower asymptotic period. The prompt jump approximation assumes the initial change is instantaneous and gives the ratio of the power just after to just before the insertion as

$\frac{n(0^+)}{n(0^-)} = \frac{\beta}{\beta - \rho}.$

This approximation is usually valid for moderate insertions, for example $\rho < \beta/2.$

=== One delayed group ===
For one effective delayed group with an average decay constant $\lambda$, precursor concentration $C$, and a constant step reactivity $\rho_0$, the point kinetics equations in terms of the instantaneous power $P(t)$ simplify to

$\frac{dP}{dt}=\frac{\rho_0-\beta}{\Lambda}P(t)+\lambda C(t),$

$\frac{dC}{dt}=\frac{\beta}{\Lambda}P(t)-\lambda C(t),$

with the general solutions

$P(t) = P_1 e^{s_1 t} + P_2 e^{s_2 t},$

$C(t) = C_1 e^{s_1 t} + C_2 e^{s_2 t},$

where the exponents are, approximately (for $\lambda\Lambda/\beta \ll 1$ and $|\rho_0| \ll \beta$),

$s_1=\frac{\lambda\rho_0}{\beta-\rho_0},$

$s_2=-(\frac{\beta-\rho_0}{\Lambda}).$

The time constant expressing the more slowly varying asymptotic behavior, $T = 1/s_1$, is sometimes referred to as the stable reactor period.

== Reactor period and the inhour equation ==
Once the fast transients have died out, the power varies as a single exponential characterized by the stable reactor period $T.$ The relation between a step reactivity $\rho$ and the resulting period is given by the inhour equation:

$\rho = \frac{\Lambda}{T} + \sum_{i=1}^{6} \frac{\beta_i}{1 + \lambda_i T}.$

In terms of the reciprocal period $s = 1/T$ this is a seventh-order polynomial: for a given reactivity it has seven roots, of which the dominant (rightmost) root gives the stable reactor period.

== Numerical solution ==
The prompt timescale (on the order of 10^{−4} s) is orders of magnitude shorter than the delayed-neutron precursor half-lives (up to about 55 s for the longest-lived group), which makes the system difficult to integrate with finite-difference schemes. The prompt jump approximation is frequently used in numerical studies of the point kinetics equations precisely because it eliminates this very short time scale.

== Applications ==
To design a nuclear reactor core, reactor kinetics analysis is necessary to assess safety margins and decide where control and safety instruments are placed; the point kinetics model is the simplest description of the core neutronics, and most thermal-hydraulic system codes use it as their power model for most transient analyses because it is considered conservative, and therefore adequate, for safety assessments. It is broadly applicable to pressurized water reactor (PWR) anticipated operational occurrences, while boiling water reactor (BWR) events with coolant voids need at least one-dimensional spatial resolution (preferably three-dimensional), and reactivity-initiated accidents in both PWRs and BWRs need multi-dimensional diffusion or transport models.

In operation the same equations run backwards. A detector measures the flux, the kinetic parameters are known, and the inverse kinetics method gives the reactivity. Control rod worth is calibrated this way, and the method differs from the rod drop and period methods. During startup the flux may vary by a factor of 10^{10} or more, and a short period can appear while it is still low. Short periods must be avoided for safety, so the flux is measured from the source level to full power.

Not all transients conform to the model. Where the flux distribution itself changes rapidly, as in an asymmetric control rod withdrawal, a space-dependent kinetics model is required, and the design-basis reactivity accidents with the largest insertion rates, rod ejection in a pressurized water reactor and rod drop in a boiling water reactor, are modeled with multi-dimensional kinetics.

== See also ==
- Delayed neutron
- Inhour equation
- Reactivity (nuclear)
