= Multiplication factor =

Multiplication factor may refer to:

- Neutron multiplication factor, in a nuclear chain reaction
- Multiplication factor, a term used in digital photography

== See also ==
- Multiplicative factor
