= Prompt criticality =

Sustained nuclear fission achieved solely by prompt neutron emission

In nuclear engineering, prompt criticality is the criticality (the state in which a nuclear chain reaction is self-sustaining) that is achieved with prompt neutrons alone (without the efforts of delayed neutrons). As a result, prompt supercriticality causes a much more rapid growth in the rate of energy release than other forms of criticality. Nuclear weapons are based on prompt criticality, while nuclear reactors rely on delayed neutrons or external neutrons to achieve criticality.

== Criticality ==
Neutron multiplicity distribution for uranium-235 fission

An assembly is critical if each fission event causes, on average, exactly one additional such event in a continual chain. Such a chain is a self-sustaining fission chain reaction. When a uranium-235 (U-235) atom undergoes nuclear fission, it releases an average of 2.43 neutrons, most commonly two or three. In this situation, an assembly is critical if every released neutron has a ^{1}/_{2.43} = 0.41 = 41 % probability of causing another fission event as opposed to either being absorbed by a non-fission capture event or escaping from the fissile core.

The average number of neutrons that cause new fission events is called the effective neutron multiplication factor, usually denoted by the symbols k-effective, k-eff or k. When k-effective is equal to 1, the assembly is called critical, if k-effective is less than 1 the assembly is said to be subcritical, and if k-effective is greater than 1 the assembly is called supercritical.

== Critical versus prompt-critical ==
In a supercritical assembly, the number of fissions per unit time, N, along with the power production, increases exponentially with time. How fast it grows depends on the average time it takes, T, for the neutrons released in a fission event to cause another fission. The growth rate of the reaction is given by:

$$N(t) = N_0 k^\frac{t}{T} \,$$

Most of the neutrons released by a fission event are the ones released in the fission itself. These are called prompt neutrons, and strike other nuclei and cause additional fissions within nanoseconds (in nuclear weapons work, this interval is about one shake, or 10 ns). A small additional source of neutrons is the fission products. Some of the nuclei resulting from the fission are radioactive isotopes with short half-lives, and nuclear reactions among them release additional neutrons after a long delay of up to several minutes after the initial fission event. These neutrons, which on average account for less than one percent of the total neutrons released by fission, are called delayed neutrons. The fraction of fission neutrons that are delayed depends on the isotope being fissioned: for fissions induced by thermal neutrons it is 0.65% for uranium-235 and only 0.21% for plutonium-239. In plutonium systems this fraction is correspondingly smaller, and prompt criticality is therefore reached after a far smaller reactivity increase than in uranium systems. The relatively slow timescale on which delayed neutrons appear is an important aspect for the design of nuclear reactors, as it allows the reactor power level to be controlled via the gradual, mechanical movement of control rods. For a small reactivity insertion (0.1%) in a uranium-235 thermal reactor, the power period is 57 seconds when delayed neutrons are included, but only 0.1 seconds without them, a difference of over a factor of 500 in the time available for control action.Typically, control rods contain neutron poisons (substances, for example boron or hafnium, that easily capture neutrons without producing any additional ones) as a means of altering k-effective. With the exception of experimental pulsed reactors, nuclear reactors are designed to operate in a delayed-critical mode and are provided with safety systems to prevent them from ever achieving prompt criticality.

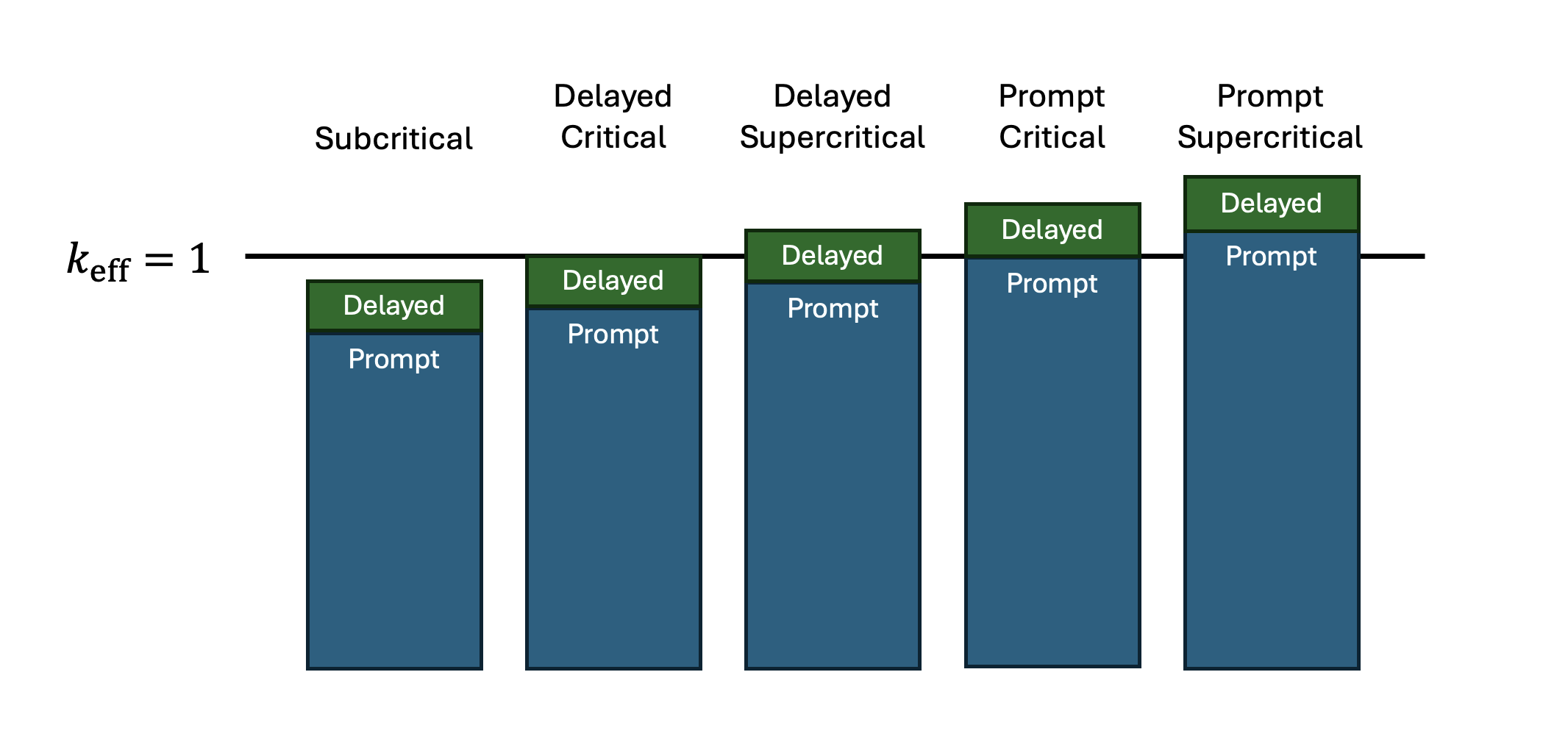
Diagram explaining criticality types. $k_{\mathrm{eff}}$ is the effective neutron multiplication factor.

In a delayed-critical assembly, the delayed neutrons are needed to make k-effective greater than one. Thus the time between successive generations of the reaction, T, is dominated by the time it takes for the delayed neutrons to be released, of the order of seconds or minutes. Therefore, the reaction will increase slowly, with a long time constant. This is slow enough to allow the reaction to be controlled with electromechanical control systems such as control rods, and accordingly all nuclear reactors are designed to operate in the delayed-criticality regime.

In contrast, a critical assembly is said to be prompt-critical if it is critical (k = 1) without any contribution from delayed neutrons and prompt-supercritical if it is supercritical (the fission rate growing exponentially, k > 1) without any contribution from delayed neutrons. In this case the time between successive generations of the reaction, T, is limited only by the fission rate from the prompt neutrons, and the increase in the reaction will be extremely rapid, causing a rapid release of energy within a few milliseconds. Stacey's worked example illustrates the scale: when a reactivity of about 1.7 times the delayed neutron fraction is inserted all at once, as when a bank of control rods is ejected, the neutron population multiplies by nearly 800 in 0.1 s, leaving no time for corrective action before the reactor is destroyed by its own heating. Prompt-critical assemblies are created by design in nuclear weapons and some specially designed research experiments.

The difference between a prompt neutron and a delayed neutron has to do with the source from which the neutron has been released into the reactor. The neutrons, once released, have no difference except the energy or speed that have been imparted to them. A nuclear weapon relies heavily on prompt-supercriticality (to produce a high peak power in a fraction of a second), whereas nuclear power reactors use delayed-criticality to produce controllable power levels for months or years.

== Nuclear reactors ==
In order to start up a controllable fission reaction, the assembly must be delayed-critical. In other words, k must be greater than 1 (supercritical) without crossing the prompt-critical threshold. In nuclear reactors this is possible due to delayed neutrons. Because it takes some time before these neutrons are emitted following a fission event, it is possible to control the nuclear reaction using control rods.

A steady-state (constant power) reactor is operated so that it is critical due to the delayed neutrons, but would not be so without their contribution. During a gradual and deliberate increase in reactor power level, the reactor is delayed-supercritical. The exponential increase of reactor activity is slow enough to make it possible to control the criticality factor, k, by inserting or withdrawing rods of neutron absorbing material. Using careful control rod movements, it is thus possible to achieve a supercritical reactor core without reaching an unsafe prompt-critical state.

Once a reactor plant is operating at its target or design power level, it can be operated to maintain its critical condition for long periods of time.

=== Prompt critical accidents ===
Nuclear reactors can be susceptible to prompt-criticality accidents if a large increase in reactivity (or k-effective) occurs, e.g., following failure of their control and safety systems. The rapid uncontrollable increase in reactor power in prompt-critical conditions is likely to irreparably damage the reactor and in extreme cases, may breach the containment of the reactor. Nuclear reactors' safety systems are designed to prevent prompt criticality and, for defense in depth, reactor structures also provide multiple layers of containment as a precaution against any accidental releases of radioactive fission products.

With the exception of research and experimental reactors, only a small number of reactor accidents are thought to have achieved prompt criticality, for example Chernobyl #4, the U.S. Army's SL-1, and Soviet submarine K-431. In all these examples, the uncontrolled surge in power was sufficient to cause an explosion that destroyed the reactor and released radioactive fission products into the atmosphere.

At Chernobyl in 1986, a test procedure which required cutting power to half of the reactor's coolant pumps was undertaken. This test, in combination with a poorly-understood positive scram effect, resulted in a dangerously overheated reactor core. This led to the rupturing of the fuel elements and water pipes, vaporization of water, a steam explosion, and a graphite fire. Estimated power levels prior to the incident suggest that it operated in excess of 30 GW, ten times its 3 GW maximum thermal output. The reactor chamber's 2000-ton lid was lifted by the steam explosion. Since the reactor was not designed with a containment building capable of containing this catastrophic explosion, the accident released large amounts of radioactive material into the environment.

In the other two incidents, the reactors failed due to errors during a maintenance shutdown involving the rapid and uncontrolled removal of at least one control rod. The SL-1 was a prototype reactor intended for use by the US Army in remote polar locations. At the SL-1 plant in 1961, the reactor was brought from shut down to a prompt critical state by manually extracting the central control rod too far. As the water in the core quickly converted to steam and expanded (in just a few milliseconds), the 26,000-pound (12,000 kg) reactor vessel jumped 9 feet 1 inch (2.77 m), leaving impressions in the ceiling above. All three men performing the maintenance procedure died from injuries. 1,100 curies of fission products were released as parts of the core were expelled. It took 2 years to investigate the accident and clean up the site. The excess prompt reactivity of the SL-1 core was calculated in a 1962 report:

The delayed neutron fraction of the SL-1 is 0.70%... Conclusive evidence revealed that the SL-1 excursion was caused by the partial withdrawal of the central control rod. The reactivity associated with the 20-inch withdrawal of this one rod has been estimated to be 2.4% δk/k, which was sufficient to induce prompt criticality and place the reactor on a 4 millisecond period.

In the K-431 reactor accident, 10 were killed during a refueling operation. The K-431 explosion destroyed the forward and aft compartments and damaged the submarine's pressure hull. In these two catastrophes, the reactors went from completely shutdown to prompt critical in a fraction of a second, damaging the reactors beyond repair.

== List of accidental prompt critical excursions ==
A number of research reactors and tests have purposely examined the operation of a prompt critical reactor plant. CRAC, KEWB, SPERT-I, Godiva device, and BORAX experiments contributed to this research. Many accidents have also occurred, however, primarily during research and processing of nuclear fuel. SL-1 is the notable exception.

The following list of prompt critical power excursions is adapted from a report submitted in 2000 by a team of American and Russian nuclear scientists who studied criticality accidents, published by the Los Alamos Scientific Laboratory, the location of many of the excursions. A typical power excursion is about 1 × 10^{17} fissions.

- Los Alamos Scientific Laboratory, 21 August 1945
- Los Alamos Scientific Laboratory, 21 May 1946
- Los Alamos Scientific Laboratory, December 1949, 3 or 4 × 10^{16} fissions
- Los Alamos Scientific Laboratory, 1 February 1951
- Los Alamos Scientific Laboratory, 18 April 1952
- Argonne National Laboratory, 2 June 1952
- Oak Ridge National Laboratory, 26 May 1954
- Oak Ridge National Laboratory, 1 February 1956
- Los Alamos Scientific Laboratory, 3 July 1956
- Los Alamos Scientific Laboratory, 12 February 1957
- Mayak Production Association, 2 January 1958
- Oak Ridge Y-12 Plant, 16 June 1958 (possible)
- Los Alamos Scientific Laboratory, Cecil Kelley criticality accident, 30 December 1958
- SL-1, 3 January 1961, 4 × 10^{18} fissions or 130 megajoules (36 kWh)
- Idaho Chemical Processing Plant, 25 January 1961
- Los Alamos Scientific Laboratory, 11 December 1962
- Sarov (Arzamas-16), 11 March 1963
- White Sands Missile Range, 28 May 1965
- Oak Ridge National Laboratory, 30 January 1968
- Chelyabinsk-70, 5 April 1968
- Aberdeen Proving Ground, 6 September 1968
- Mayak Production Association, 10 December 1968 (2 prompt critical excursions)
- Kurchatov Institute, 15 February 1971 and 26 May 1971 (1971 Kurchatov Institute criticality accidents)
- Idaho Chemical Processing Plant, 17 October 1978 (very nearly prompt critical)
- Soviet submarine K-431, 10 August 1985
- Chernobyl disaster, 26 April 1986
- Sarov (Arzamas-16), 17 June 1997
- JCO Fuel Fabrication Plant, 30 September 1999

== Nuclear weapons ==
In the design of nuclear weapons, in contrast, achieving prompt criticality is essential. Indeed, one of the design problems to overcome in constructing a bomb is to compress the fissile materials enough to achieve prompt criticality before the chain reaction has a chance to produce enough energy to cause the core to expand too much. A good bomb design must therefore win the race to a dense, prompt critical core before a less-powerful chain reaction disassembles the core without allowing a significant amount of fuel to fission (known as a fizzle). This generally means that nuclear bombs need special attention paid to the way the core is assembled, such as the implosion method, suggested by Richard C. Tolman at a 1942 conference at the University of California, Berkeley.

== See also ==
- Subcritical reactor
- Thermal neutron
- Void coefficient
