= InHour =

Unit of reactivity of a nuclear reactor

InHour is a unit of reactivity of a nuclear reactor. It stands for the inverse of an hour. It is equal to the inverse of the period in hours. One InHour is the amount of reactivity needed to increase the reaction from critical to where the power will increase by a factor of e in one hour.

The unit is abbreviated ih or inhr, and is usually measured with a reactimeter.

== See also ==
- Per cent mille
