= Zero power critical =

Condition of nuclear fission reactors

Zero power critical is a condition of nuclear fission reactors that is useful for characterizing the reactor core. A reactor is in the zero power critical state if it is sustaining a stable fission chain reaction with no significant growth or decay in the reaction rate, and at a low enough level that thermal considerations are not important to the reaction. For example, a reactor that can produce gigawatts of heat might be considered zero-power critical when producing 100 watts of heat through a fission chain reaction.

Most nuclear reactors are held at a zero-power critical condition as part of the start-up sequence, to assess the condition of the reactor itself.

== Role of Zero Power Reactors in Nuclear Safety ==
The Nuclear Energy Agency (NEA) has documented a shift in the usage of zero power reactors (ZPRs). Previously used for engineering prototypes, these reactors now serve in validating nuclear data and simulation codes. This shift has occurred against a backdrop of a global decrease in ZPR facilities, affecting the field's experimental capabilities.

The NEA workshop "The Demise of Zero Power Reactors: From Concern to Action," held on June 22–23, 2023, at the Institut de Radioprotection et de Sûreté Nucléaire in France, addressed these changes. This event brought together international experts to discuss new approaches for reactor physics validation and data preservation, considering the reduced number of ZPR facilities. A report from the NEA's Working Party on Scientific Issues and Uncertainty Analysis of Reactor Systems Task Force on Zero Power Reactors, due in early 2024, will summarize these discussions. It is expected to offer guidance on ZPRs' future role in nuclear safety and regulation.

== See also ==
- Zero Power Physics Reactor
