= Inhour equation =

Equation in nuclear reactor kinetics

The Inhour equation is used in nuclear reactor kinetics to relate reactivity and the reactor period. Inhour is short for "inverse hour" and is defined as the reactivity which will make the stable reactor period equal to 1 hour (3,600 seconds). Reactivity is more commonly expressed as per cent millie (pcm) of $\Delta k/k$ or dollars.

The Inhour equation is obtained by dividing the reactivity equation, Equation 1, by the corresponding value of the inhour unit, shown by Equation 2.

$\rho (reactivity)= \frac{l}{T_p}+\sum_{i=1}^6\frac{\beta_i}{1+\lambda_iT_p}$ [Equation 1]

$In = \frac{\frac{l}{T_p}+\sum_{i=1}^6\frac{\beta_i}{1+\lambda_iT_p}}{\frac{l}{3600}+\sum_{i=1}^6\frac{\beta_i}{1+\lambda_i3600}}$ [Equation 2]

where

- $\rho$ is the reactivity,
- $l$ is the prompt neutron lifetime,
- $T_p$ is the reactor period,
- $\beta_i$ is the fraction of delayed neutrons of the $i$th kind,
- $\lambda_i$ is the precursor decay constant of the $i$th kind,
- and $In$ is the reactivity expressed in inhours.

For small reactivity or large reactor periods, unity may be neglected in comparison with $\lambda_iT_p$ and $\lambda_i3600$ and the Inhour equation can be simplified to Equation 3.

$In = \frac{3600}{T_p}$ [Equation 3]

In large natural uranium-graphite reactors, reactivity is frequently given in inhours; in the long-period limit, a stable period of $N$ hours corresponds to a reactivity of $1/N$ inhours. For uranium-235, the long-period approximation gives $\rho \approx 2.3\times 10^{-5}$ per inhour.

The inhour equation is initially derived from the point kinetics equations. The point reactor kinetics model assumes that the spatial flux shape does not change with time. This removes spatial dependencies and looks at only changes with time in the neutron population. The point kinetics equation for neutron population is shown in Equation 4.

$\frac{dn}{dt}= \frac{k(1-\beta)-1}{l}n(t)+\sum_{i=1}^I\lambda_iC_i(t)$ [Equation 4]

where $k$ = multiplication factor (neutrons created/neutrons destroyed)

The delayed neutrons (produced from fission products in the reactor) contribute to reactor time behavior and reactivity. The prompt neutron lifetime in a modern thermal reactor is about $10^{-4}$ seconds, thus it is not feasible to control reactor behavior with prompt neutrons alone. Reactor time behavior can be characterized by weighing the prompt and delayed neutron yield fractions to obtain the average neutron lifetime, $\Lambda = l/k$, or the mean generation time between the birth of a neutron and the subsequent absorption inducing fission. Reactivity, $\rho$, is the change in $k$ effective or $(k-1)/k$.

For one effective delayed group with an average decay constant $\lambda$ and precursor concentration $C$, the point kinetics equation can be simplified to Equation 5 and Equation 6 with general solutions Equation 7 and 8, respectively.

$\frac{dP}{dt}=\frac{\rho_o-\beta}{\Lambda}P(t)+\lambda C(t)$ [Equation 5]

$\frac{dC}{dt}=\frac{\beta}{\Lambda}P(t)-\lambda C(t)$ [Equation 6]

General Solutions

$P(t) = P_1 e^{s_1 t} + P_2 e^{s_2 t}$ [Equation 7]

$C(t) = C_1 e^{s_1 t} + C_2 e^{s_2 t}$ [Equation 8]

where

$s_1=\frac{\lambda\rho_o}{\beta-\rho_o}$

$s_2=-(\frac{\beta-\rho_o}{\Lambda})$

The time constant expressing the more slowly varying asymptotic behavior is referred to as the stable reactor period.

== Properties and applications ==
Graphical solution of the six-group inhour equation: reactivity ρ against the inverse reactor period ω = 1/T, with the seven roots marked.

For six groups of delayed neutrons, the inhour equation is a seventh-order polynomial in $1/T$, the reciprocal of the reactor period. Its seven roots give the time evolution of the system after a step change in reactivity: when the reactivity is negative, all seven are negative, whereas for positive reactivity exactly one is positive, and its reciprocal is the stable reactor period; the other six correspond to short-lived components that disappear soon after the step. In the long-time limit the dominant root $s_1$ alone governs the power, $P(t) \propto e^{s_1 t} = e^{t/T}$, where $T = 1/s_1$ is the stable reactor period.

Reactor period against reactivity for Uranium-235.

The prompt-neutron lifetime does not affect the stable period in the small-reactivity limit, where the term $l/T_p$ in the inhour equation is negligible against the delayed-neutron contributions. As the reactivity grows, the two no longer separate: above a reactivity of roughly 0.003 with uranium-235, a shorter prompt lifetime yields a shorter period at the same reactivity, which is one reason fast reactors are harder to control than thermal ones at high reactivity. In the limit of very large reactivity the period tends to $l/\rho$, the value it would take if every fission neutron were prompt. Since $\rho = (k-1)/k$, reactivity can never reach or exceed 1, which would correspond to a non-positive multiplication factor, so this prompt limit is approached as $\rho \to 1.$ At $\rho = \beta$ the reactor response changes from being dominated by delayed neutrons to being dominated by prompt neutrons: reactors with $0 < \rho < \beta$ are described as delayed critical, since their criticality depends on the delayed-neutron contribution, while $\rho \geq \beta$ is called prompt critical (or prompt supercritical), a condition avoided in operation because the power rise would be very rapid.

On shutdown, when the reactivity is a large negative value ($|\rho| \gg \beta$), the period is set by the decay constant $\lambda_1$ of the longest-lived delayed-neutron group rather than by the reactivity itself: after a deep subcritical insertion the short-lived precursor groups decay away, leaving the power to decay with the longest-lived group alone, so the period tends to $-1/\lambda_1$, the fastest decay a subcritical reactor can have. For uranium-235 ($\lambda_1 = 0.0124~\mathrm{s}^{-1}$) this is approximately −80 s, and graphite- and light-water-moderated reactors are observed to bottom out near that value. Reactors moderated by beryllium or heavy water reach a longer period because fission-product gamma rays knock photoneutrons out of those moderators.

The equation also provides a way to determine reactivity experimentally: a small perturbation is applied to a critical reactor, the asymptotic period of the resulting transient is measured, and the worth of the perturbation is read off from the inhour equation. The method is reliable for positive (supercritical) periods; in the subcritical case the asymptotic period is governed mainly by the decay of the longest-lived precursors, so it carries little information about the reactivity.

In fast-reactor experiments, reactivity data from material-replacement measurements are often reported in cents per mole or inhours per kilogram, converted to absolute reactivity ($\Delta k/k$) through a factor such as inhours per percent $\Delta k/k$.
