= Void coefficient =

Change in nuclear fission rate caused by voids in a reactor

In nuclear engineering, the void coefficient (more properly called void coefficient of reactivity) is a number that can be used to estimate how much the reactivity of a nuclear reactor changes as voids (typically steam bubbles) form in the reactor moderator or coolant. Net reactivity in a reactor depends on several factors, one of which is the void coefficient. Reactors in which either the moderator or the coolant is a liquid will typically have a void coefficient which is either negative (if the reactor is under-moderated) or positive (if the reactor is over-moderated). Reactors in which neither the moderator nor the coolant is a liquid (e.g., a graphite-moderated, gas-cooled reactor) are those for which the void coefficient is not an issue.

== Explanation ==
Nuclear fission reactors run on nuclear chain reactions, in which each nucleus that undergoes fission releases heat and neutrons. Each neutron may impact another nucleus and cause it to undergo fission. The speed of this neutron affects its probability of causing additional fission. Thermal neutrons are more easily absorbed by fissile nuclei than fast neutrons, so a neutron moderator that slows neutrons will increase the reactivity of a nuclear reactor. A neutron absorber will decrease the reactivity of a nuclear reactor. These two mechanisms are used to control the thermal power output of a nuclear reactor.

In order to extract useful power from a nuclear reactor, and (for most reactor designs) to keep it intact and functioning, a cooling system must be used. Some reactors circulate pressurized water; some use liquid metal, such as sodium, NaK, lead, or mercury; others use gases (see advanced gas-cooled reactor). If the coolant is a liquid, it may boil if the temperature inside the reactor rises. This boiling leads to voids inside the reactor. Voids may also form if coolant is lost from the reactor in some sort of accident (called a loss of coolant accident, which has other dangers). Some reactors operate with the coolant in a constant state of boiling, using the generated vapor to turn turbines.

The coolant may absorb or slow neutrons, or both. In each case, the amount of void inside the reactor can affect the reactivity of the reactor. The change in reactivity caused by a change of voids inside the reactor is directly proportional to the void coefficient. The void coefficient $\alpha_V$ is the change in reactivity $\rho$ per unit change in the void fraction $\alpha$, the share of the coolant volume that is vapor:
$$\alpha_V = \frac{d\rho}{d\alpha}, \qquad \Delta\rho = \alpha_V\,\Delta\alpha,$$
where $\Delta\rho$ is the change in reactivity that results from a change $\Delta\alpha$ in the void fraction. The two coefficients are not expressed in the same units:

Units of reactivity coefficients
Coefficient	Definition	Units
Void coefficient	$\alpha_V = d\rho/d\alpha$	dimensionless for a change per unit void fraction; in practice the coefficient is quoted as $\Delta\rho$ per percent void
Temperature coefficient	$\alpha_T = d\rho/dT$	per °C or per K

When the coolant also serves as the moderator, boiling has two opposing effects on reactivity: the smaller amount of coolant/moderator in the core absorbs fewer neutrons, which adds reactivity, and it also slows neutrons less effectively, which removes reactivity. In an under-moderated reactor the loss of moderation dominates, so the void coefficient is negative; in an over-moderated reactor, where the moderator is separated from the coolant as in the RBMK and CANDU designs, the loss of absorption dominates and the void coefficient is positive.

A positive void coefficient means that the reactivity increases as the void content inside the reactor increases due to increased boiling or loss of coolant; for example, if the coolant acts predominantly as neutron absorber. This positive void coefficient causes a positive feedback loop, starting with the first occurrence of steam bubbles. This can quickly boil all the coolant in the reactor, if not countered by an (automatic) control mechanism, or if said mechanism's response time is too slow. This happened in the RBMK reactor that was destroyed in the Chernobyl disaster due to the positive void coefficient and the large positive power coefficients present at lower reactor power levels, the EPS scram accelerating rather than dampening reactivity resulting in the explosion.

A negative void coefficient means that the reactivity decreases as the void content inside the reactor increases—but it also means that the reactivity increases if the void content inside the reactor is reduced. In boiling-water reactors with large negative void coefficients, a sudden pressure rise (caused, for example, by unplanned closure of a streamline valve) will result in a sudden decrease in void content: the increased pressure will cause some of the steam bubbles to condense ("collapse"); and the thermal output will possibly increase until it is terminated by safety systems, by increased void formation due to the higher power, or, possibly, by system or component failures that relieve pressure, causing void content to increase and power to decrease. Boiling water reactors are all designed (and required) to handle this type of transient. On the other hand, if a reactor is designed to operate with no voids at all, a large negative void coefficient may serve as a safety system. A loss of coolant in such a reactor decreases the thermal output, but of course heat that is generated is no longer removed, so the temperature could rise (if all other safety systems simultaneously failed).

Thus, a large void coefficient, whether positive or negative, can be either a design issue (requiring more careful, faster-acting control systems) or a desired quality depending on reactor design. Gas-cooled reactors do not have issues with voids forming.

== Reactor designs ==
- Boiling water reactors generally have negative void coefficients, and in normal operation the negative void coefficient allows reactor power to be adjusted by changing the rate of water flow through the core. The negative void coefficient can cause an unplanned reactor power increase in events (such as sudden closure of a streamline valve) where the reactor pressure is suddenly increased. In addition, the negative void coefficient can result in power oscillations in the event of a sudden reduction in core flow, such as might be caused by a recirculation pump failure. Boiling water reactors are designed to ensure that the rate of pressure rise from a sudden streamline valve closure is limited to acceptable values, and they include multiple safety systems designed to ensure that any sudden reactor power increases or unstable power oscillations are terminated before fuel or piping damage can occur.
- Pressurized water reactors operate with a relatively small amount of voids, and the water serves as both moderator and coolant. Thus a large negative void coefficient ensures that if the water boils or is lost the power output will drop.
- CANDU reactors have positive void coefficients that are small enough that the control systems can easily respond to boiling coolant before the reactor reaches dangerous temperatures (see External links). Furthermore, a loss of coolant accident automatically scrams the reactor and unlike in light water reactors, the introduction of "regular" water to the reactor core—for example as an emergency coolant—does not pose the risk of criticality as a CANDU can only reach criticality in the absence of the neutron absorption that is present in significant quantities of light water.
- RBMK reactors, such as the reactors at Chernobyl, had a dangerously high positive void coefficient. This allowed the reactor to run on unenriched uranium and to require no heavy water, saving costs; RBMKs were also capable of producing weapons-grade plutonium, unlike the other main Soviet design, the VVER. Before the Chernobyl accident these reactors had a positive void coefficient of 4.7 beta, which after the accident was lowered to 0.7 beta so they could safely remain in service.
- Fast breeder reactors do not use moderators, since they run on fast neutrons, but the coolant (often lead or sodium) may serve as a neutron absorber and reflector. For this reason they have a positive void coefficient.
- Magnox reactors, advanced gas-cooled reactors and pebble bed reactors are gas-cooled and so void coefficients are not an issue. In fact, some can be designed so that total loss of coolant does not cause core meltdown even in the absence of active control systems. As with any reactor design, loss of coolant is only one of many possible failures that could potentially lead to an accident. In case of accidental ingress of liquid water into the core of pebble bed reactors, a positive void coefficient may occur. Magnox and UNGG reactors were designed with the dual purpose of producing electrical power and weapon grade plutonium.
- The Advanced CANDU reactor, a never built proposed reactor type based on the CANDU, promises a negative void coefficient but it must use slightly enriched uranium as a fuel and cannot operate with natural uranium as the "regular" CANDU does.
- In a molten salt reactor the salt is usually neither a strong moderator nor a neutron poison. If a thermal neutron spectrum is used, external moderators such as nuclear graphite are usually employed. Volatile fission products can "bubble out" of solution and as the fuel is dissolved in the salt, this decreases reactivity at and around the site of the bubble. Furthermore, most of the fission product noble gases—chief among them Xenon-135 are strong neutron poisons. As the boiling point of the involved salts is relatively high (at a point at which the structural integrity of the housing for the molten salt would be in question), there is usually little to no emphasis put on the consequences of it boiling off. Frequently molten salt reactors employ a melt plug that melts at much lower temperatures than the boiling point of the salts and allows them to solidify in a core catcher.

== See also ==
- Nuclear physics
