= Per cent mille =

One-thousandth of a percent

Visualisation of 1%, 1‰, 1‱, 1 pcm and 1 ppm as fractions of the large block (larger version)

A per cent mille, or pcm, is a hundred-thousandth, or a thousandth of a percent. It can be thought of as a "milli-percent". It is commonly used in epidemiology, and in nuclear reactor engineering as a unit of reactivity.

== Epidemiology ==
Statistics of crime rates, mortality and disease prevalence in a population are often given in "per 100 000".

== Nuclear reactivity ==
In nuclear reactor engineering, a per cent mille is equal to one-thousandth of a percent of the reactivity, denoted by Greek lowercase letter rho. Reactivity is a dimensionless unit representing a departure from criticality, calculated by:

$$\rho=(k_{\text{eff}}-1)/k_{\text{eff}}$$

where k_{eff} denotes the effective multiplication factor for the reaction. Therefore, one pcm is equal to:

$$1~\text{pcm} = \rho \cdot 10^5$$

This unit is commonly used in the operation of light-water reactor sites because reactivity values tend to be small, so measuring in pcm allows reactivity to be expressed using whole numbers.

== Related units ==
- Percentage point difference of 1 part in 100
- Percentage (%) 1 part in 100
- Per mille (‰) 1 part in 1,000
- Basis point (bp) difference of 1 part in 10,000
- Permyriad (‱) 1 part in 10,000
- Parts-per notation including parts-per million, parts-per billion etc

== See also ==
- InHour (another unit of reactivity)
- Dollar (reactivity)
- Parts-per notation
- Per-unit system
- Percent point function
