= Criticality (status) =

State in the operation of a nuclear reactor

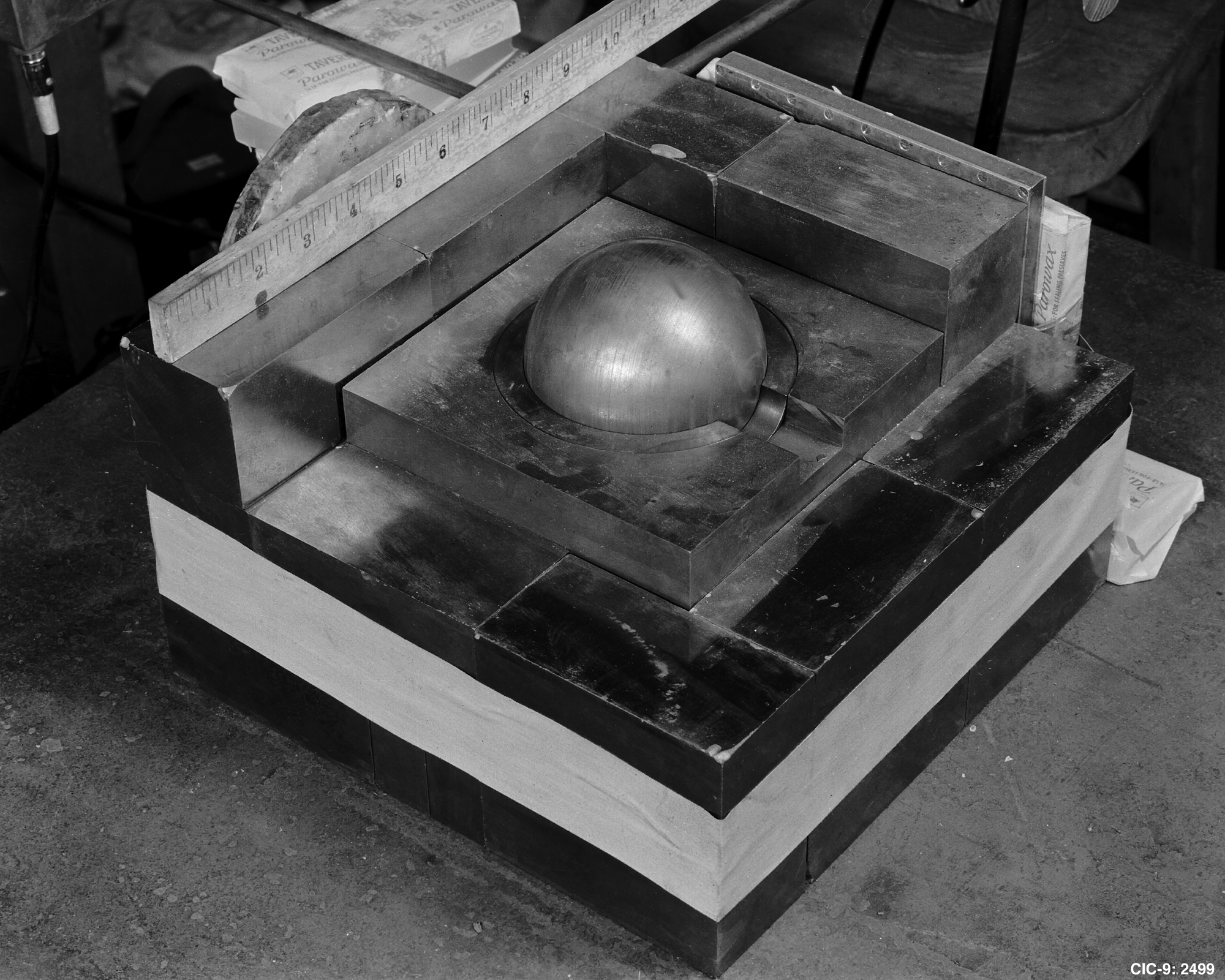
A sphere of plutonium surrounded by neutron-reflecting blocks of tungsten carbide. A re-creation of the August 21, 1945 criticality accident at Los Alamos.

In the operation of a nuclear reactor, criticality or critical state is the state in which a nuclear chain reaction is self-sustaining but not growing. Subcriticality or subcritical state is the state in which a nuclear chain reaction is not self-sustaining. Supercriticality or supercritical state is the state in which a nuclear chain reaction is self-sustaining and growing. Sometimes, less preferably, criticality takes a wider definition, and refers to any state in which a nuclear chain reaction is self-sustaining, no matter growing or not (encompassing criticality in strict definition and supercriticality).

In terms of reactivity, reactivity is 0 in criticality, less than 0 in subcriticality, greater than 0 in supercriticality. In terms of effective neutron multiplication factor ($K_{eff}$), $K_{eff}$ is 1 in criticality, less than 1 in subcriticality, greater than 1 in supercriticality.

== Applications ==
Criticality is the normal operating condition of a nuclear reactor, in which nuclear fuel sustains a fission chain reaction. A reactor achieves criticality (and is said to be critical) when each fission releases a sufficient number of neutrons to sustain an ongoing series of nuclear reactions.

The International Atomic Energy Agency defines the first criticality date as the date when the reactor is made critical for the first time. This is an important milestone in the construction and commissioning of a nuclear power plant.

Criticality is also the state of a nuclear weapon usually directly before it fires. This is where up to 80 generations of chain reactions occur causing an immense energy spike; normally leading to mass destruction.

== Prompt criticality ==
The event of fission must release, on the average, more than one free neutron of the desired energy level in order to sustain a chain reaction, and each must find other nuclei and cause them to fission. Most of the neutrons released from a fission event come immediately from that event, but a fraction of them come later, when the fission products decay, which may be on the average from microseconds to minutes later. This is fortunate for atomic power generation, for without this delay "going critical" would be an immediately catastrophic event, as it is in a nuclear bomb where upwards of 80 generations of chain reaction occur in less than a microsecond, far too fast for a human, or even a machine, to react. Physicists recognize two points in the gradual increase of neutron flux which are significant: critical, where the chain reaction becomes self-sustaining thanks to the contributions of both kinds of neutron generation, and prompt critical, where the immediate "prompt" neutrons alone will sustain the reaction without need for the decay neutrons. In terms of reactivity, a reactor at criticality has a reactivity of 0, a reactor above criticality (including prompt criticality) has positive reactivity, and a reactor below criticality has negative reactivity; equivalently, the effective neutron multiplication factor $K_{eff}$ is 1, greater than 1, and less than 1 in the three cases, the two quantities being related by $\rho = (K_{eff} - 1)/K_{eff}$. The boundary between the two regimes is the delayed-neutron fraction $\beta$: a reactor with $0 < \rho < \beta$ is called delayed critical, and one with $\rho \ge \beta$ is prompt critical; for a uranium-235 thermal reactor, $\rho = \beta$ corresponds to $K_{eff} \approx 1.0065$, and a reactivity of $\rho = \beta$ is one dollar. Nuclear power plants operate between these two points of reactivity. Devices that have operated above the prompt critical point include nuclear weapons, pulsed reactor designs (such as TRIGA research reactors and the pulsed nuclear thermal rocket), and some nuclear power accidents, such as the 1961 US SL-1 accident and 1986 Soviet Chernobyl disaster.

== See also ==
- Criticality accident
- Critical mass
- Prompt criticality
