= Special Power Excursion Reactor Test Program =

The Special Power Excursion Reactor Test Program (SPERT) was a series of tests focusing on the safety of nuclear reactors. It was commissioned in 1954 by the U.S. Atomic Energy Commission, to be run by the Phillips Petroleum Company.

== Reactors ==
=== SPERT-I ===
The SPERT-I reactor became operational in July 1955, with the first tests being performed in September.

=== SPERT-II ===
The SPERT-II reactor became operational in March 1960.
