= Delayed neutron =

Delayed emission of neutrons after nuclear fission

In nuclear engineering, a delayed neutron is a neutron released not immediately during a nuclear fission event, but shortly afterward—ranging from milliseconds to several minutes later. These neutrons are emitted by excited daughter nuclei of certain beta-decaying fission products. In contrast, prompt neutrons are emitted almost instantaneously—within about 10^{−14} seconds—at the moment of fission.

During fission, a heavy nucleus splits into two smaller, neutron-rich fragments (fission products), releasing several free neutrons known as prompt neutrons. Many of these fission products are radioactive and typically undergo beta decay to reach more stable configurations. In a small subset of cases, the beta decay of a fission product results in a daughter nucleus in an excited state with enough energy to emit a neutron. This neutron, emitted shortly after fission but delayed due to the beta decay process, is called a delayed neutron.

The delay in neutron emission arises from the time required for the precursor nuclide (the beta-decaying fission product) to undergo beta decay—a process that takes orders of magnitude longer than the prompt emission of neutrons during fission. While the delayed neutron is emitted almost immediately after beta decay, it is actually released by the excited daughter nucleus produced in that decay. Therefore, the overall timing of delayed neutron emission is governed by the beta decay half-life of the precursor.

Delayed neutrons are critically important for controlling nuclear reactors. Their delayed appearance allows for a slower, more manageable response in reactor power changes, significantly enhancing both operational stability and safety.

== Principle ==
Delayed neutrons are associated with the beta decay of the fission products. After prompt fission neutron emission the residual fragments are still neutron rich and undergo a beta decay chain. The more neutron rich the fragment, the more energetic and faster the beta decay. In some cases the available energy in the beta decay is high enough to leave the residual nucleus in such a highly excited state that neutron emission instead of gamma emission occurs.

Using U-235 as an example, this nucleus absorbs thermal neutrons, and the immediate mass products of a fission event are two large fission fragments, which are remnants of the formed U-236 nucleus. These fragments emit two to three free neutrons (2.43 on average), called "prompt" neutrons. A subsequent fission fragment occasionally undergoes a stage of radioactive decay (which is a beta minus decay) that yields a new nucleus (the emitter nucleus) in an excited state that emits an additional neutron, called a "delayed" neutron, to get to ground state. These neutron-emitting fission fragments are called delayed neutron precursor atoms.

The longest-lived groups can be traced to specific decay chains. In about 70% of ^{87}Br beta decays (half-life 55 s), the ^{87}Kr daughter is left in a nuclear state above the 5.4 MeV needed to eject its last neutron; it promptly releases a neutron, ending as stable ^{86}Kr. The neutron emission rate is set by the rate of formation of ^{87}Kr, so the group carries the 55 s half-life of the precursor. The 23 s group is attributed mainly to ^{137}I (half-life 24.5 s), which beta decays to excited states of ^{137}Xe that promptly emit a neutron to form stable ^{136}Xe. In both cases the number of neutrons in the emitter exceeds a magic number (50 and 82, respectively) by exactly one neutron, so the last neutron is weakly bound and easily emitted; the other, shorter-lived groups are produced in analogous chains.

Delayed Neutron Data for Thermal Fission of U-233, U-235 and Pu-239

Group	Half-Life (s)	Decay Constant (s^{−1})	Energy (keV)	Yield, Neutrons per Fission			Fraction		
				U-233	U-235	Pu-239	U-233	U-235	Pu-239
1	55.72	0.0124	250	0.00057	0.00052	0.00021	0.000225	0.000215	0.0000689
2	22.72	0.0305	560	0.00197	0.00346	0.00182	0.000776	0.001424	0.000597
3	6.22	0.111	405	0.00166	0.00310	0.00129	0.000654	0.001274	0.000423
4	2.30	0.301	450	0.00184	0.00624	0.00199	0.000725	0.002568	0.000652
5	0.610	1.14	–	0.00034	0.00182	0.00052	0.000134	0.000748	0.000170
6	0.230	3.01	–	0.00022	0.00066	0.00027	0.0000867	0.000273	0.0000885

There are at least 45 precursor isotopes. In reactor analysis they are conventionally combined into six effective groups, each with an effective half-life (about 55, 22, 6, 2, 0.5, and 0.2 seconds) and an effective yield. The 55-second group is dominated by ^{87}Br, the 22-second group by ^{88}Br and ^{137}I, and the shorter-lived groups have many contributors. The group parameters depend on the fuel isotope, since fission product yields vary with the fissile material.

An eight-group structure has also been defined, which uses the same set of half-lives for all fissioning systems, with the three longest-lived groups corresponding to the three dominant long-lived precursors ^{87}Br, ^{137}I and ^{88}Br. The International Atomic Energy Agency (IAEA) publishes eight-group parameters for several actinides; for thermal fission of U-235 they are:

Group	Half-Life (s)	Decay Constant (s^{−1})	Fraction of delayed neutrons	Fraction of all neutrons (%)
1	55.6	0.012467	0.0328	0.0218
2	24.5	0.028292	0.1539	0.1023
3	16.3	0.042524	0.091	0.0605
4	5.21	0.133042	0.197	0.131
5	2.37	0.292467	0.3308	0.2200
6	1.04	0.666488	0.0902	0.0600
7	0.424	1.634781	0.0812	0.0540
8	0.195	3.554600	0.0229	0.0152

The last column sums to 0.665%, a delayed neutron fraction of 0.00665 for thermal fission of U-235.

== Importance in nuclear reactors ==
If a nuclear reactor happened to be prompt critical – even very slightly – the number of neutrons would increase exponentially at a high rate, and very quickly the reactor would become uncontrollable by means of external mechanisms. The control of the power rise would then be left to its intrinsic physical stability factors, like the thermal dilatation of the core, or the increased resonance absorptions of neutrons, that usually tend to decrease the reactor's reactivity when temperature rises; but the reactor would run the risk of being damaged or destroyed by heat.

However, thanks to the delayed neutrons, it is possible to leave the reactor in a subcritical state as far as only prompt neutrons are concerned: the delayed neutrons come a moment later, just in time to sustain the chain reaction when it is going to die out. In that regime, neutron production overall still grows exponentially, but on a time scale that is governed by the delayed neutron production, which is slow enough to be controlled (just as an otherwise unstable bicycle can be balanced because human reflexes are quick enough on the time scale of its instability). For example, with a neutron lifetime of 10^{−3} s and a reactivity step of 0.0022, the reactor period would be 0.45 s without delayed neutrons, but is 14 s with them. Thus, by widening the margins of non-operation and supercriticality and allowing more time to regulate the reactor, the delayed neutrons are essential to inherent reactor safety, even in reactors requiring active control.

The lower percentage of delayed neutrons makes the use of large percentages of plutonium in nuclear reactors more challenging.

In reactors with D2O or beryllium moderators or reflectors, photoneutrons produced by gamma rays from fission products also behave as an additional group of delayed neutrons in reactor kinetics, because their emission rate is set by the slow beta decay of the fission products.

=== Prompt jump approximation ===
One-group point kinetics response of a thermal U-235 reactor to a step insertion of 200 pcm of reactivity. Left: the prompt jump to about 1.44 times the initial power, followed by growth on the delayed-neutron time scale. Right: the two terms of the exact solution, whose sum is continuous at the step.

In the one-delayed-group model of point reactor kinetics, the response of a previously critical reactor to a sudden insertion of positive reactivity $\rho$, with $0 < \rho < \beta$, is a sum of two exponential terms: a fast prompt-neutron transient that dies away on a time scale of the order of $\Lambda/(\beta-\rho)$, where $\Lambda$ is the prompt neutron generation time, and a slow term that grows as $e^{\lambda\rho t/(\beta-\rho)}$, where $\lambda$ is the effective precursor decay constant. The fast term is negative and cancels the excess of the slow term at $t=0$, so the power is continuous at the moment of insertion.

Because $\Lambda$ is very short (of order 10^{−4} s in a thermal reactor), the fast transient vanishes almost instantaneously, and the power appears to jump abruptly from its initial value $P_0$ to $P_0\,\beta/(\beta-\rho)$. This near-instantaneous change is the prompt jump; more generally, a reactivity step from $\rho_1$ to $\rho_2$ changes the power by the factor $(\beta-\rho_1)/(\beta-\rho_2)$.

Setting the prompt generation time to zero so that the jump is instantaneous gives the prompt jump approximation, in which the power then evolves on the delayed-neutron time scale alone:

$$P(t) = P_0\,\frac{\beta}{\beta-\rho}\,e^{\lambda\rho t/(\beta-\rho)}$$

Numerical solutions of the full point kinetics equations show the approximation to be accurate to within about 1% for reactivity insertions up to about $0.5\beta$.

== Fraction definitions ==
The precursor yield fraction β is defined as:

$$\beta = \frac{\mbox{precursor atoms}}
{\mbox{prompt neutrons}+\mbox{precursor atoms}}.$$

and it is equal to 0.0065 for U-235.

The value of β depends on the fissioning isotope and on the energy of the fissioning neutrons, so it is not a universal constant. Thermal fission of Pu-239 gives β ≈ 0.0021, about a third of the U-235 value, while fast fission of U-238 gives 0.0148, so the values differ by more than a factor of seven across the actinides. In a reactor, the effective β must be averaged over the fuel isotope mixture, which changes with core life. Since the bred fuels Pu-239 and U-233 have somewhat lower delayed neutron yields than U-235, in most thermal reactors the effective delayed neutron fraction decreases as the core ages.

The delayed neutron fraction (DNF) is defined as:

$$DNF = \frac{\mbox{delayed neutrons}}
{\mbox{prompt neutrons}+\mbox{delayed neutrons}}.$$

These two factors, β and DNF, are almost the same thing, but not quite; they differ in the case a rapid (faster than the decay time of the precursor atoms) change in the number of neutrons in the reactor.

Another concept is the effective fraction of delayed neutrons β_{eff}, which is the fraction of delayed neutrons weighted (over space, energy, and angle) on the adjoint neutron flux. This concept arises because delayed neutrons are emitted with an energy spectrum more thermalized relative to prompt neutrons. For low enriched uranium fuel working on a thermal neutron spectrum, the difference between the average and effective delayed neutron fractions can reach 50 pcm.

== See also ==
- Prompt critical
- Critical mass
- Nuclear chain reaction
- Dollar (reactivity)
