= Prompt neutron =

Immediate emission of neutrons after nuclear fission

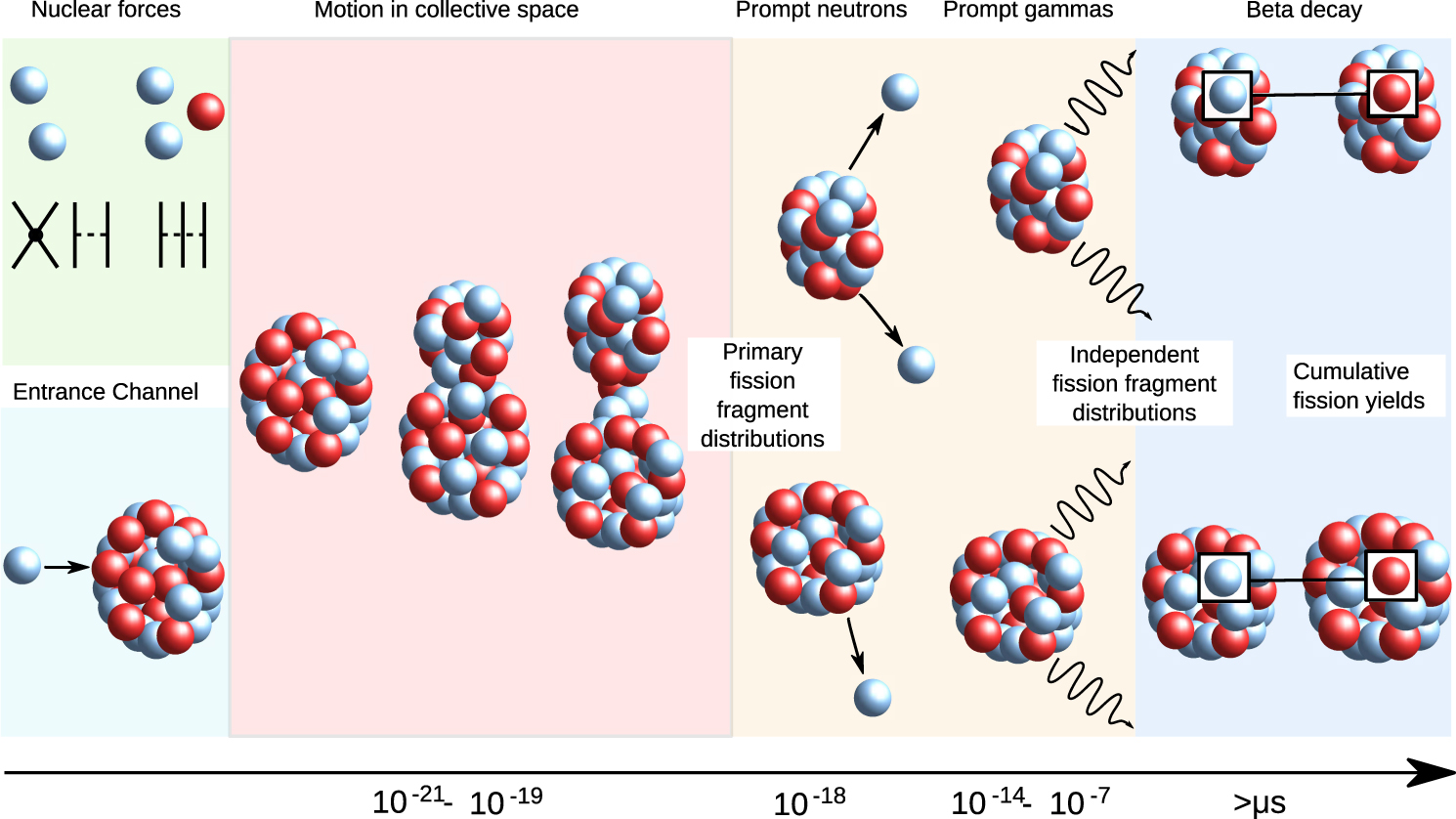
Diagram of a fission event; the prompt neutrons are emitted in the yellow area, after between 10^{–18} and 10^{–14} seconds.

In nuclear engineering, a prompt neutron is a neutron immediately emitted (neutron emission) by a nuclear fission event, as opposed to a delayed neutron decay which can occur within the same context, emitted after beta decay of one of the fission products anytime from a few milliseconds to a few minutes later.

Prompt neutrons emerge from the fission of an unstable fissionable or fissile heavy nucleus almost instantaneously. There are different definitions for how long it takes for a prompt neutron to emerge. For example, the United States Department of Energy defines a prompt neutron as a neutron born from fission within 10^{−13} seconds after the fission event. The U.S. Nuclear Regulatory Commission defines a prompt neutron as a neutron emerging from fission within 10^{−14} seconds. This emission is controlled by the nuclear force and is extremely fast. By contrast, so-called delayed neutrons are delayed by the time delay associated with beta decay (mediated by the weak force) to the precursor excited nuclide, after which neutron emission happens on a prompt time scale (i.e., almost immediately).

== Principle ==
Using uranium-235 as an example, this nucleus absorbs a thermal neutron, and the immediate mass products of a fission event are two large fission fragments, which are remnants of the formed uranium-236 nucleus. These fragments emit two or three free neutrons (2.5 on average), called prompt neutrons. The fragments are both neutron-rich and highly excited; each cools by evaporating neutrons until its excitation energy falls below the neutron separation energy, after which it de-excites by a cascade of gamma rays. The average number of neutrons released per fission, $\nu$, increases slowly with the energy of the incident neutron: one additional neutron is emitted for every 6 to 7 MeV increase in neutron energy. It also depends on the isotope that fissions: for thermal fission it is 2.4355 for uranium-235 and 2.8836 for plutonium-239. A subsequent fission fragment occasionally undergoes a stage of radioactive decay that yields an additional neutron, called a delayed neutron. These neutron-emitting fission fragments are called delayed neutron precursor atoms.

Delayed neutrons are associated with the beta decay of the fission products. After prompt fission neutron emission the residual fragments are still neutron rich and undergo a beta decay chain. The more neutron rich the fragment, the more energetic and faster the beta decay. In some cases the available energy in the beta decay is high enough to leave the residual nucleus in such a highly excited state that neutron emission instead of gamma emission occurs.

Delayed Neutron Data for Thermal Fission in Uranium-235
Group	Half-Life (s)	Decay Constant (s^{−1})	Energy (keV)	Fraction (β_{i})	Yield of delayed neutrons per fission (ν_{i})	Total neutrons per fission (ν_{t})
1	55.72	0.0124	250	0.000215	0.00052	2.4
2	22.72	0.0305	560	0.001424	0.00346	2.4
3	6.22	0.111	405	0.001274	0.00310	2.4
4	2.30	0.301	450	0.002568	0.00624	2.4
5	0.610	1.14	—	0.000748	0.00182	2.4
6	0.230	3.01	—	0.000273	0.00066	2.4
Total				0.0065	0.0158	2.4

== Energy spectrum ==
Prompt fission-neutron energy spectrum for thermal fission of U-235 (Watt fit).

Prompt neutrons are released over a continuous range of energies. For thermal fission of uranium-235, the distribution is well fitted by

$$\chi(E) = 0.453\, e^{-1.036\,E}\, \sinh\left(\sqrt{2.29\,E}\right)$$

where $E$ is the neutron energy in MeV. The fit is valid from about 0.18 to 12 MeV. The mean energy is 1.98 MeV, and the energy at the peak of the spectrum (the most probable energy) is 0.73 MeV. The bulk of the neutrons lie between 1 and 2 MeV, but some exceed 10 MeV; this high-energy tail must be considered in reactor shielding design.

== Importance in nuclear fission basic research ==
The standard deviation of the final kinetic energy distribution as a function of the final fragment mass from low-energy fission of uranium 234 and uranium 236 presents a peak in the light fragment mass region and another in the heavy fragment mass region. Simulations by the Monte Carlo method of these experiments suggest that those peaks are produced by prompt neutron emission. The effect of prompt neutron emission does not provide a primary mass and kinetic energy distribution, which is important for studying fission dynamics from the saddle point to the scission point.

== Importance in nuclear reactors ==
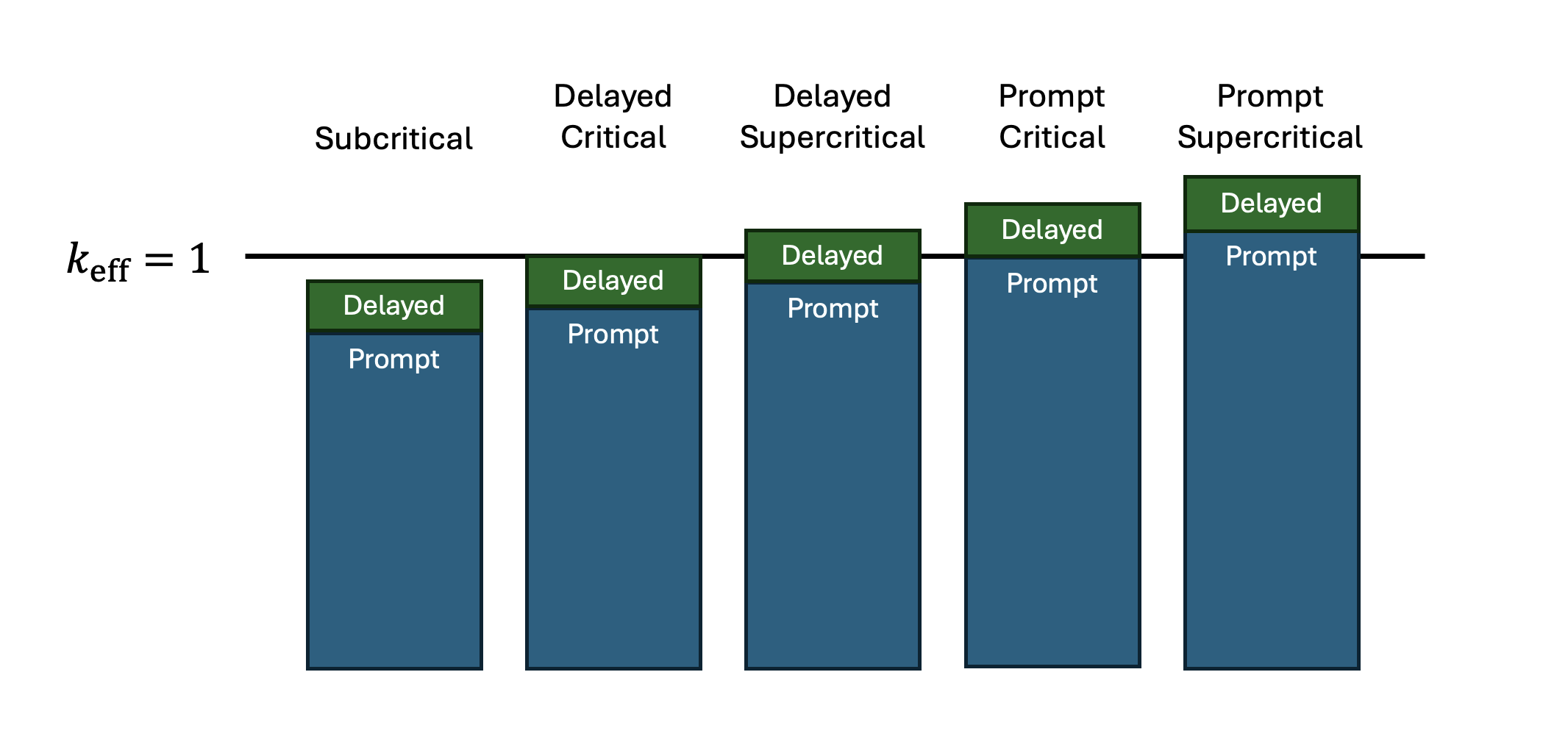
Diagram explaining criticality types. $k_{\mathrm{eff}}$ is the effective neutron multiplication factor.

If a nuclear reactor happened to be prompt critical — even very slightly — the number of neutrons and power output would increase exponentially at a high rate. The response time of mechanical systems like control rods is far too slow to moderate this kind of power surge. The control of the power rise would then be left to its intrinsic physical stability factors, like the thermal dilatation of the core, or the increased resonance absorptions of neutrons, that usually tend to decrease the reactor's reactivity when temperature rises; but the reactor would run the risk of being damaged or destroyed by heat.

However, thanks to the delayed neutrons, it is possible to leave the reactor in a subcritical state as far as only prompt neutrons are concerned: the delayed neutrons come a moment later, just in time to sustain the chain reaction when it is going to die out. In that regime, neutron production overall still grows exponentially, but on a time scale that is governed by the delayed neutron production, which is slow enough to be controlled (just as an otherwise unstable bicycle can be balanced because human reflexes are quick enough on the time scale of its instability). Thus, by widening the margins of non-operation and supercriticality and allowing more time to regulate the reactor, the delayed neutrons are essential to inherent reactor safety and even in reactors requiring active control.

== Fraction definitions ==
The factor $\beta$ is defined as:

$$\beta = \frac{\mbox{precursor atoms}}
{\mbox{prompt neutrons}+\mbox{precursor atoms}}.$$

and it is equal to 0.0064 for U-235.

The delayed neutron fraction (DNF) is defined as:

$$DNF = \frac{\mbox{delayed neutrons}}
{\mbox{prompt neutrons}+\mbox{delayed neutrons}}.$$

These two factors, β and DNF, are not the same thing in case of a rapid change in the number of neutrons in the reactor.

Another concept is the effective fraction of delayed neutrons, which is the fraction of delayed neutrons weighted (over space, energy, and angle) on the adjoint neutron flux. This concept arises because delayed neutrons are emitted with an energy spectrum more thermalized relative to prompt neutrons. For low enriched uranium fuel working on a thermal neutron spectrum, the difference between the average and effective delayed neutron fractions can reach 50 pcm (1 pcm = 1e-5).

== See also ==
- Prompt criticality
- Critical mass
- Nuclear chain reaction
