= List of Guggenheim Fellowships awarded in 1987 =

Two hundred and seventy-three scholars, artists, and scientists received Guggenheim Fellowships in 1987. $6,336,000 was disbursed between the recipients, who were chosen from an applicant pool of 3,421 Princeton University and Yale tied for most fellowship recipients on their faculty (9 each), followed by Harvard University in second (8), and Columbia University, Cornell University, and Stanford University tied for third (7 each).

== 1987 U.S. and Canadian Fellows ==
Category	Field of Study	Fellow	Institutional association	Research topic	Notes	Ref
Creative Arts	Choreography	Yoshiko Chuma	School of Hard Knocks			
Creative Arts	Choreography	Annabelle Gamson		Reconstruction of solo dances from the 1920s and 1930s		
Creative Arts	Choreography	David Gordon	Pick Up Performance Company	Choreography and video	Also won in 1981	
Creative Arts	Drama & Performance Art	Allan Havis	Ulster County Community College	Hospitality (1991): Play based on the life of Patricia Lara		
Creative Arts	Drama & Performance Art	Len Jenkin	New York University	Playwriting		
Creative Arts	Drama & Performance Art	Craig Lucas		Playwriting		
Creative Arts	Fiction	Yuz Aleshkovsky	Wesleyan University (in residence)	Question Mark		
Creative Arts	Fiction	Harold Brodkey	City College of New York (visiting)	Writing		
Creative Arts	Fiction	Laurie Colwin		Writing		
Creative Arts	Fiction	Frank Conroy	University of Iowa	Writing		
Creative Arts	Fiction	Ellen Currie		Writing		
Creative Arts	Fiction	Deborah Eisenberg		Writing		
Creative Arts	Fiction	Charles R. Johnson	University of Washington	Writing		
Creative Arts	Fiction	Norman Rush		Mating and a series of short stories		
Creative Arts	Fiction	Gilbert Sorrentino	Stanford University	Writing	Also won in 1973	
Creative Arts	Fiction	Sharon Sheehe Stark	Norwich University	Writing a second novel		
Creative Arts	Film	Charles Atlas		Filmmaking		
Creative Arts	Film	Morgan Fisher		Filmmaking		
Creative Arts	Film	Robert Hillmann		Filmmaking		
Creative Arts	Film	Diane Orr		Lost Forever: Everett Ruess (2001)	With C. Larry Roberts	
Creative Arts	Film	David Parry	Dartmouth College	Film about his wife reentering the workforce after having children		
Creative Arts	Film	Mark Rappaport		Filmmaking		
Creative Arts	Film	C. Larry Roberts		Lost Forever: Everett Ruess (2001)	With Diane Orr; died 1988	
Creative Arts	Fine Arts	Arakawa		Painting		
Creative Arts	Fine Arts	Eugene Brodsky		Painting	Also won in 1979	
Creative Arts	Fine Arts	Allan D'Arcangelo	Brooklyn College	Painting and sculpture		
Creative Arts	Fine Arts	Stuart Diamond	Parsons School of Design	Painting		
Creative Arts	Fine Arts	Ellen Driscoll	SUNY Purchase	Sculpture		
Creative Arts	Fine Arts	Irving Geis		Creation of an artistic archive of molecular structure		
Creative Arts	Fine Arts	Michael Gitlin	Columbia University	Sculpture and drawing		
Creative Arts	Fine Arts	Edward A. Love	Howard University	Visual art		
Creative Arts	Fine Arts	Margot Lovejoy	SUNY Purchase	Installation project		
Creative Arts	Fine Arts	Joshua Neustein		Painting		
Creative Arts	Fine Arts	Liz Phillips		Sound sculpture: Graphite Ground		
Creative Arts	Fine Arts	Howardena D. Pindell	SUNY at Stony Brook	Painting		
Creative Arts	Fine Arts	Faith Ringgold	UC San Diego	Visual art		
Creative Arts	Fine Arts	Miriam Schapiro		Painting		
Creative Arts	Fine Arts	Lee Tribe	Bennington College	Sculpture		
Creative Arts	Fine Arts	William T. Williams	Brooklyn College	Painting		
Creative Arts	Music Composition	William Albright	University of Michigan	Composing	Also won in 1976	
Creative Arts	Music Composition	Susan Blaustein	Columbia University	Composing		
Creative Arts	Music Composition	William Doppmann		Composing		
Creative Arts	Music Composition	Andrew D. Frank	UC Davis	Composing		
Creative Arts	Music Composition	Kamran N. Ince		Composing		
Creative Arts	Music Composition	David Lang		Composing		
Creative Arts	Music Composition	Ira J. Mowitz	Stanford University	Composing		
Creative Arts	Music Composition	Richard Toensing	University of Colorado, Boulder	Composing		
Creative Arts	Music Composition	George T. Walker	Rutgers University	Composing	Also won in 1969	
Creative Arts	Photography	Joseph Bartscherer	Cornish College of the Arts			
Creative Arts	Photography	Leon A. Borensztein				
Creative Arts	Photography	Philip-Lorca diCorcia		Traveled to Los Angeles		
Creative Arts	Photography	Sally Munger Mann		The Shadow of Sorrow: Teenage pregnancy		
Creative Arts	Photography	Richard Pare	Canadian Centre for Architecture			
Creative Arts	Photography	Catherine Wagner	Mills College			
Creative Arts	Photography	Neil Winokur				
Creative Arts	Poetry	Robert Bringhurst		Writing		
Creative Arts	Poetry	T. Carmi	New York University	Writing		
Creative Arts	Poetry	Louise Glück	Williams College and UCLA	Writing	Also won in 1975	
Creative Arts	Poetry	Debora Greger	University of Florida (visiting)	Writing		
Creative Arts	Poetry	John Koethe	University of Wisconsin-Milwaukee	Writing		
Creative Arts	Poetry	Sydney Lea	Middlebury College (visiting)	Writing		
Creative Arts	Poetry	J. D. McClatchy		Writing		
Creative Arts	Poetry	Katha Pollitt		Writing		
Creative Arts	Poetry	Dabney Stuart	Washington and Lee University	Don't Look Back (published 1987)		
Creative Arts	Poetry	C. D. Wright	Brown University	Writing		
Creative Arts	Video & Audio	Julie M. Gustafson	Global Village Video	The Value of Life		
Creative Arts	Video & Audio	Shigeko Kubota				
Creative Arts	Video & Audio	Richard M. Lerman	School of the Museum of Fine Arts at Tufts	Sound art: Making microphones out of "various materials, such as leaves or bamboo, or metal, and recording the sounds of the environment they pick up."		
Creative Arts	Video & Audio	Stevenson J. Palfi				
Creative Arts	Video & Audio	Buky Schwartz		Video installations		
Creative Arts	Video & Audio	William George Wegman			Also won in 1975	
Humanities	African Studies	Richard H. Elphick	Wesleyan University	Christianity in South African social thought		
Humanities	African Studies	Richard A. Joseph	Dartmouth College	Political thought and action of Obafemi Awolowo of Nigeria		
Humanities	African Studies	Patrick Manning	Northeastern University	Demography of slavery in Africa, 1740-1850		
Humanities	American Literature	Lawrence Buell	Oberlin College			
Humanities	American Literature	Arnold Rampersad	Rutgers University	Black writers and the modern world		
Humanities	American Literature	Robert von Hallberg	University of Chicago			
Humanities	Architecture, Planning, & Design	Mardges Bacon	Trinity College	Le Corbusier's first visit to the US		
Humanities	Architecture, Planning, & Design	Thomas S. Hines	UCLA	History of the image of Los Angeles		
Humanities	Biography	Bernard Avishai	Harvard Business Review	Arthur Koestler		
Humanities	Biography	Hugh Ford	Trenton State College	Glenway Wescott		
Humanities	British History	John Maurice Beattie	University of Toronto	The criminal law and the administration of justice in London, 1689-1740		
Humanities	British History	Barbara J. Shapiro	UC Berkeley	Sources of Anglo-American criminal law of evidence		
Humanities	Classics	Apostolos N. Athanassakis	UC Santa Barbara	Concept of honor in the mountains of western Crete		
Humanities	Classics	Kevin Clinton	Cornell University	Inscriptions of the sanctuary of Demeter and Kore at Eleusis, Greece		
Humanities	Dance Studies	VèVè A. Clark	Tufts University	Katherine Dunham		
Humanities	East Asian Studies	Albert Feuerwerker	University of Michigan	Handicraft industry in late imperial and republican China		
Humanities	East Asian Studies	Merle Goldman	Boston University	Humanistic elite in post-Mao China		
Humanities	East Asian Studies	Frederick W. Mote	Princeton University	China's absorption of Yunnan, 1500-1800	Also won in 1968	
Humanities	Economic History	Claudia Goldin	University of Pennsylvania	Evolution of the female labor force in America		
Humanities	Economic History	Roger L. Ransom	UC Riverside			
Humanities	English Literature	Vereen M. Bell	Vanderbilt University	Comparison of "Yeats' real life with the way [he] characterized himself in his poems"		
Humanities	English Literature	Clark Hulse	University of Illinois	Poetry and painting in the Elizabethan Renaissance		
Humanities	English Literature	Ulrich C. Knoepflmacher	Princeton University	Wordsworth's art of appropriation and his appropriation by the Romantics and Victorians	Also won in 1969	
Humanities	English Literature	Paul J. Korshin	University of Pennsylvania	Study of Samuel Johnson's The Rambler		
Humanities	English Literature	John Kucich	University of Michigan	Avant-garde characteristics of Victorian realism		
Humanities	English Literature	Michael Lieb	University of Illinois	Visionary mode in the Middle Ages and the Renaissance		
Humanities	English Literature	Martin Meisel	Columbia University	Imagination of chaos	Also won in 1963	
Humanities	English Literature	Margot Norris	University of Michigan			
Humanities	English Literature	Ruth Perry	Massachusetts Institute of Technology	Contribution of gender to the formation of the English novel, 1750-1815		
Humanities	English Literature	Tilottama Rajan	University of Wisconsin-Madison	Role of the reader in Romantic literature		
Humanities	English Literature	Gary F. Waller	Carnegie Mellon University	Family of Sir Philip Sidney		
Humanities	Film, Video, & Radio Studies	Dudley Andrew	University of Iowa	French film and culture in the 1930s		
Humanities	Film, Video, & Radio Studies	Terrence Rafferty		Films of Chris Marker		
Humanities	Fine Arts Research	Dennis Adrian	Northwestern University	Catalogue raisonné of the sculpture of H. C. Westermann		
Humanities	Fine Arts Research	Jeffrey M. Hurwit	University of Oregon	Representation of nature in early Greek art and poetry		
Humanities	Fine Arts Research	J. Patrice Marandel	Detroit Institute of Arts	Critical edition of 18th-century documents on French art		
Humanities	Fine Arts Research	Esther Pasztory	Columbia University	Art of Teotihuacan		
Humanities	Fine Arts Research	Richard E. Spear	Oberlin College	A re-evaluation of Guido Reni		
Humanities	Fine Arts Research	Bryan Jay Wolf	Yale University	Art, ideology, and the middle class in 19th-century America		
Humanities	Folklore & Popular Culture	Robert S. Cantwell				
Humanities	Folklore & Popular Culture	John Miller Chernoff	Institute for the Study of Human Issues	History and ethics among the Dagbamba of northern Ghana		
Humanities	Folklore & Popular Culture	Robert Christgau	The Village Voice	Critical history of popular music		
Humanities	French History	William Reddy	Duke University	French society under the July Monarchy, 1830-1848		
Humanities	French Literature	Jean-Marie Apostolidès	Harvard University	Images of women in French cinema		
Humanities	French Literature	Marie-Hélène Huet	Amherst College	Monstrosity and imagination in the creative process		
Humanities	French Literature	Michele H. Richman	University of Pennsylvania			
Humanities	French Literature	Daniel Russell	University of Pittsburgh	Emblematic structures in Renaissance French culture		
Humanities	French Literature	Susan Rubin Suleiman	Harvard University	Modern French experimental fiction		
Humanities	General Nonfiction	Mary Catherine Bateson	Amherst College	Patterns of commitment in women's lives		
Humanities	General Nonfiction	Barbara Ehrenreich		The New Right and the decline of public generosity		
Humanities	General Nonfiction	Michael T. Kaufman	The New York Times	Polish life and Polish lives		
Humanities	General Nonfiction	Barry Lopez		The scale of human time		
Humanities	General Nonfiction	Alec Wilkinson	The New Yorker	Harvest of sugarcane in Florida by West Indian migrant labor		
Humanities	German & East European History	Jonathan Sperber	University of Missouri	Popular movements and organized radicalism in the Rhineland		
Humanities	German & Scandinavian Literature	Lorna Martens	Yale University	Transition and transgression in Austrian literature, 1890-1924		
Humanities	German & Scandinavian Literature	Rainer Nägele	Johns Hopkins University	Walter Benjamin and the emergence of modern literary theory		
Humanities	History of Science & Technology	Basim Fuad Musallam	University of Cambridge	Avicenna's biology		
Humanities	History of Science & Technology	David Rosner	Baruch College and Graduate Center CUNY	History of occupational health and safety in 20th-century America		
Humanities	History of Science & Technology	Richard S. Westfall	Indiana University	Relationship between patronage and science in the 17th century		
Humanities	Iberian & Latin American History	Thomas F. Glick	Boston University	Darwinism in Latin America		
Humanities	Iberian & Latin American History	Carla Rahn Phillips	San Diego State University (visiting)	Spanish wool trade from 1350-1780		
Humanities	Intellectual & Cultural History	Robert J. Bezucha	Amherst College	Animals and Western culture since the 18th century		
Humanities	Intellectual & Cultural History	Alfred W. Crosby	University of Texas	The Measure of Reality (published 1997)		
Humanities	Italian Literature	Alice A. Kelikian	Brandeis University			
Humanities	Italian Literature	William J. Kennedy	Cornell University	Reception of Petrarch's poetry in the Renaissance		
Humanities	Linguistics	Joan L. Bybee	SUNY at Buffalo	Mood and modality in the languages of the world		
Humanities	Linguistics	William David Labov	University of Pennsylvania		Also won in 1970	
Humanities	Literary Criticism	Aaron Moses Fogel	Boston University	Demographic themes in 20th-century poetry		
Humanities	Literary Criticism	Richard A. Lanham	UCLA	Rhetorical self-consciousness		
Humanities	Literary Criticism	Mary Louise Pratt	Stanford University			
Humanities	Literary Criticism	Eve Kosofsky Sedgwick	UC Berkeley (visiting)	Knowledge, figuration, and homosexual definition in early modernist fiction		
Humanities	Medieval History	Alan E. Bernstein	University of Arizona	Historical impact of hell from the time of the Hebrew Bible to Dante's Inferno		
Humanities	Medieval History	Robert Somerville	Columbia University	Late 11th-century papacy	Also won in 1974	
Humanities	Medieval History	Gabrielle M. Spiegel	University of Maryland	Origins of vernacular historiography in 13th-century France		
Humanities	Medieval Literature	Ralph Hanna III	UC Riverside	Ricardian prose		
Humanities	Medieval Literature	Stephen G. Nichols	University of Pennsylvania	Romance languages - writing and orality in troubadour poetry		
Humanities	Medieval Literature	Lee Patterson	Duke University	Politics of Middle English literature		
Humanities	Music Research	Lawrence F. Bernstein	University of Pennsylvania	History of French secular music of the 16th century		
Humanities	Music Research	Vivian Perlis	Yale University	Historical interludes for Aaron Copland's autobiography		
Humanities	Music Research	Alejandro Enrique Planchart	UC Santa Barbara	Biography of Guillaume Du Fay		
Humanities	Music Research	Nicolas Slonimsky				
Humanities	Near Eastern Studies	Arnold Joseph Band	UCLA	Posthumous works of S. Y. Agnon		
Humanities	Near Eastern Studies	Carl F. Petry	Northwestern University			
Humanities	Philosophy	John M. Cooper	Princeton University	Ancient Greek tradition in philosophical ethics		
Humanities	Philosophy	John S. Earman	University of Pittsburgh			
Humanities	Philosophy	Michael Friedman	University of Illinois at Chicago	Kant's philosophy of science		
Humanities	Philosophy	Jonathan D. Lear	Yale University	Self-observation and self-criticism		
Humanities	Philosophy	Elaine Scarry	University of Pennsylvania	Matter of consent		
Humanities	Philosophy	Sydney Shoemaker	Cornell University	Challenges to a materialist account of mind		
Humanities	Philosophy	Brian Skyrms	UC Irvine	Dynamics of rational deliberation		
Humanities	Photography Studies	James L. Enyeart	University of Arizona	Changing environment of the arts		
Humanities	Religion	Steven D. Fraade	Yale University	Asceticism and pietism in ancient Judaism		
Humanities	Religion	Robin W. Lovin	Southern Methodist University			
Humanities	Religion	Paul Mendes-Flohr	University of Virginia (visiting)			
Humanities	Renaissance History	Melissa M. Bullard	University of North Carolina, Chapel Hill	Edition of the letters of Lorenzo de Medici		
Humanities	Russian History	Jeffrey Brooks	University of Chicago			
Humanities	Russian History	Sheila Fitzpatrick	University of Texas, Austin			
Humanities	Russian History	Marc Raeff	Columbia University	Cultural history of the Russian emigration, 1919-1939	Also won in 1957	
Humanities	Slavic Literature	Lazar Fleishman	Stanford University			
Humanities	Spanish & Portuguese Literature	Reinaldo Ayerbe-Chaux	Syracuse University	Biography of Juan Manuel		
Humanities	Spanish & Portuguese Literature	Richard Zenith		Translated Galician-Portuguese troubadours		
Humanities	Theatre Arts	Ming Cho Lee	Yale University	Survey of pre-professional training for theater designers in the US		
Humanities	Theatre Arts	Laurence Senelick	Tufts University	"Stage transvestism"	Also won in 1979	
Humanities	United States History	Jon Butler	Yale University	Christianization of the American people, 1550-1865		
Humanities	United States History	Richard Wightman Fox	Reed College	Protestant religion in modern American culture		
Humanities	United States History	Eugene D. Genovese	University of Rochester	Life and thought of slaveholders in the South, 1790-1860		
Humanities	United States History	Thomas C. Holt	University of Michigan	Biography of W. E. B. Du Bois		
Humanities	United States History	Stephen C. Innes	University of Virginia			
Humanities	United States History	Terrence J. McDonald	University of Michigan	Politics of urbanization in America, 1830-1930, focusing on the relationships between race, class, and power		
Natural Sciences	Applied Mathematics	Alexandre J. Chorin	UC Berkeley	Computational methods in turbulence theory		
Natural Sciences	Applied Mathematics	Gene H. Golub	Stanford University	Solution of large sparse systems of linear equations		
Natural Sciences	Applied Mathematics	Marc Mangel	UC Davis	Dynamic models in behavioral and evolutionary ecology		
Natural Sciences	Applied Mathematics	Dennis Martin Mills	Cornell University	New techniques for synchrotron radiation research		
Natural Sciences	Applied Mathematics	Kang L. Wang	UCLA	Research at the Max Planck Institute		
Natural Sciences	Astronomy & Astrophysics	Charles F. Kennel	UCLA			
Natural Sciences	Astronomy & Astrophysics	William I. Newman	UCLA	Astrophysical and planetary fluid dynamics		
Natural Sciences	Chemistry	Shih-I Chu	University of Kansas	Non-linear multiphoton dynamics		
Natural Sciences	Chemistry	Andrew E. DePristo	Iowa State University			
Natural Sciences	Chemistry	Irving R. Epstein	Brandeis University	Research at Boston University and the NIH		
Natural Sciences	Chemistry	Martin Karplus	Harvard University			
Natural Sciences	Chemistry	Stephen R. Leone	Joint Institute for Laboratory Astrophysics	Chemical physics		
Natural Sciences	Chemistry	David W. Oxtoby	University of Chicago			
Natural Sciences	Chemistry	Kathlyn A. Parker	Brown University			
Natural Sciences	Chemistry	K. Barry Sharpless	Massachusetts Institute of Technology	Metal-catalyzed organic reactions		
Natural Sciences	Chemistry	Ahmed Hassan Zewail	California Institute of Technology			
Natural Sciences	Chemistry	Jeffrey I. Zink	UCLA			
Natural Sciences	Computer Science	Robert C. Berwick	Massachusetts Institute of Technology	Computational structure of natural language		
Natural Sciences	Computer Science	C. L. Liu	University of Illinois Urbana-Champaign	Computer-aided design of integrated circuits		
Natural Sciences	Computer Science	Joseph O'Rourke	Johns Hopkins University			
Natural Sciences	Earth Science	Antonio C. Lasaga	Yale University	Development of kinetic theory in mineral physics		
Natural Sciences	Earth Science	Denis L. Norton	University of Arizona	Fractures in igneous rock formed millions of years ago by cooling magma		
Natural Sciences	Earth Science	James Trefil	George Mason University			
Natural Sciences	Engineering	Klavs F. Jensen	University of Minnesota			
Natural Sciences	Engineering	Edward J. Kramer	Cornell University	Diffusion of polymers		
Natural Sciences	Engineering	William R. Schowalter	Princeton University	Non-Newtonian fluid mechanics		
Natural Sciences	Mathematics	Joseph D. Harris	Brown University	Geometry of moduli spaces		
Natural Sciences	Mathematics	Nicholas M. Katz	Princeton University	Arithmetic algebraic geometry	Also won in 1975	
Natural Sciences	Mathematics	James Lepowsky	Rutgers University	Infinite-dimensional Lie theory		
Natural Sciences	Mathematics	Alexander Nagel	University of Wisconsin-Madison	Harmonic and complex analysis		
Natural Sciences	Mathematics	Marina Ratner	UC Berkeley	Ergodic theory in semi-simple Lie groups		
Natural Sciences	Mathematics	Murad S. Taqqu	Boston University	Probabilistic and statistical aspects of self-similar processes		
Natural Sciences	Medicine & Health	Raif S. Geha	Harvard Medical School			
Natural Sciences	Medicine & Health	Samuel Goldstein	University of Arkansas			
Natural Sciences	Medicine & Health	Hyam Lerner Leffert	UC San Diego			
Natural Sciences	Molecular & Cellular Biology	David J. DeRosier	Brandeis University			
Natural Sciences	Molecular & Cellular Biology	Nigel D.F. Grindley	Yale University	Protein-DNA complexes active in recombination		
Natural Sciences	Molecular & Cellular Biology	Richard W. Hyman	Pennsylvania State University College of Medicine	Analysis of herpes zoster genes in yeast selection systems		
Natural Sciences	Molecular & Cellular Biology	Maxine F. Singer	National Institutes of Health			
Natural Sciences	Molecular & Cellular Biology	Robert L. Uffen	Michigan State University			
Natural Sciences	Neuroscience	Gary G. Matthews	SUNY at Stony Brook	Cellular mechanisms controlling secretion		
Natural Sciences	Neuroscience	Evelyn Satinoff	University of Illinois			
Natural Sciences	Organismic Biology & Ecology	Jelle Atema	Boston University	Sense organs of animals and how they discriminate among stimuli in the environment		
Natural Sciences	Organismic Biology & Ecology	May R. Berenbaum	University of Illinois			
Natural Sciences	Organismic Biology & Ecology	James L. Gould	Princeton University	Honeybee behavior		
Natural Sciences	Organismic Biology & Ecology	Jeffrey B. Graham	UC San Diego			
Natural Sciences	Organismic Biology & Ecology	John M. Hayes	Indiana University	Isotopic studies in organic geochemistry		
Natural Sciences	Organismic Biology & Ecology	Rudolf A. Raff	Indiana University	Developmental mechanisms in evolutionary change		
Natural Sciences	Physics	John B. Kogut	University of Illinois	New methods for using supercomputers to solve problems involving high-energy physics		
Natural Sciences	Physics	Alfred H. Mueller	Columbia University	Perturbative quantum chromodynamics		
Natural Sciences	Physics	Edward H. Thorndike	University of Rochester	Particle physics		
Natural Sciences	Physics	Bruno Zumino	UC Berkeley		Also won in 1968	
Natural Sciences	Plant Sciences	Kamaljit S. Bawa	University of Massachusetts Boston			
Natural Sciences	Plant Sciences	David L. Dilcher	Indiana University	Evolution of flowers	Also won in 1972	
Natural Sciences	Plant Sciences	Donald Kaplan	UC Berkeley			
Natural Sciences	Statistics	Richard A. Olshen	UC San Diego	Modeling and sample reuse techniques		
Natural Sciences	Statistics	Jon August Wellner	University of Washington	Efficient estimation for semiparametric models		
Social Sciences	Anthropology & Cultural Studies	Richard G. Fox	Duke University	Gandhian socialism as ideology and utopia		
Social Sciences	Anthropology & Cultural Studies	Sarah B. Hrdy	UC Davis	Mother Nature (published 1999)		
Social Sciences	Anthropology & Cultural Studies	Arthur J. Jelinek	University of Arizona	Artifacts from Israel and France		
Social Sciences	Anthropology & Cultural Studies	J. Jorge Klor de Alva	SUNY at Albany	Sin and confession in Aztec Mexico		
Social Sciences	Anthropology & Cultural Studies	Carol Laderman	Fordham University	Malay shamanism		
Social Sciences	Anthropology & Cultural Studies	Carol B. Stack	Duke University	Black migration and homeplace ties		
Social Sciences	Anthropology & Cultural Studies	Aram A. Yengoyan	University of Michigan	Language and cultural continuity in aboriginal Australia		
Social Sciences	Economics	W. Brian Arthur	Santa Fe Institute			
Social Sciences	Economics	William A. Brock	University of Wisconsin-Madison	Empirical applications of nonlinear dynamics		
Social Sciences	Economics	Clive W. J. Granger	UC San Diego			
Social Sciences	Economics	Jerry R. Green	Harvard University			
Social Sciences	Economics	Oliver Hart	Massachusetts Institute of Technology			
Social Sciences	Economics	John Pencavel	Stanford University			
Social Sciences	Education	Jane Roland Martin	University of Massachusetts	Social interdependence of education		
Social Sciences	Geography & Environmental Studies	Reginald Golledge	UC Santa Barbara	Spatial knowledge		
Social Sciences	Geography & Environmental Studies	Julian Wolpert	Princeton University	Generosity and civic commitment		
Social Sciences	Law	Roger C. Cramton	Cornell University	Legal education and the legal profession		
Social Sciences	Law	Robert A. Ferguson	University of Chicago			
Social Sciences	Law	Shirley Robin Letwin		History of the idea of law		
Social Sciences	Law	Alvin C. Warren	Harvard University			
Social Sciences	Political Science	R. Douglas Arnold	Princeton University	Legislative strategy and public policy		
Social Sciences	Political Science	Stanley Hoffmann	Harvard University	French national crisis, 1934-1946	Also won in 1964	
Social Sciences	Political Science	Stephen Holmes	University of Chicago	Concepts of public and private in liberal thought		
Social Sciences	Political Science	John E. Mueller	University of Rochester	Deterrence, stability, and the potential obsolescence of major war		
Social Sciences	Political Science	James N. Rosenau	University of Southern California	Turbulence in world politics		
Social Sciences	Psychology	Carol A. Fowler	Dartmouth College			
Social Sciences	Psychology	Roberta M. Golinkoff	University of Delaware			
Social Sciences	Psychology	Philip Lieberman	Brown University			
Social Sciences	Psychology	Ulric Neisser	Emory University			
Social Sciences	Psychology	Endel Tulving	University of Toronto			
Social Sciences	Sociology	Michael T. Hannan	Cornell University	Organizational diversity and social inequality		
Social Sciences	Sociology	Melvin L. Kohn	Johns Hopkins University	Cross-national research in sociology		
Social Sciences	Sociology	Ewa Morawska	University of Pennsylvania	Jews in small-town industrial America, 1880-1940		
Social Sciences	Sociology	Alberto Palloni	University of Wisconsin-Madison	Population and society in Latin America		
Social Sciences	Sociology	Lee Rainwater	Harvard University			

== 1987 Latin American and Caribbean Fellows ==
Category	Field of Study	Fellow	Institutional association	Research topic	Notes	Ref
Creative Arts	Drama & Performance Art	José Triana		Playwriting		
Creative Arts	Fiction	Maryse Condé		Writing		
Creative Arts	Fiction	Tomás Eloy Martínez	University of Maryland	Writing		
Creative Arts	Fiction	Rodolfo Rabanal		Writing		
Creative Arts	Fine Arts	Gonzalo Díaz Cuevas	Universidad de Chile	Visual art: Marcación del territorio o introducción al paisaje chileno		
Creative Arts	Fine Arts	Roberto Elía		Visual art: Hopscotch		
Creative Arts	Music Composition	Mario Lavista	Pauta	Composed an opera, Aura (premiered 1988)		
Creative Arts	Photography	Pedro Meyer		Photographic essay of the United States		
Creative Arts	Poetry	Carlos Germán Belli		Writing	Also won in 1969	
Humanities	Architecture, Planning, & Design	Graziano Gasparini		Indigenous architecture of Venezuela		
Humanities	Architecture, Planning, & Design	Patricio Gross		Urban ideology and plans for urbanization in Santiago, Chile, 1875-1985		
Humanities	Iberian & Latin American History	Barry Higman	University of the West Indies			
Humanities	Iberian & Latin American History	Antonio F. Mitre Canahuati	Universidade Federal de Minas Gerais	Mining industry in Bolivia		
Humanities	Iberian & Latin American History	Enrique Semo	Universidad Nacional Autónoma de México	Social roots of authoritarianism and democracy in Mexico, 1810-1928		
Humanities	Latin American Literature	Lisa Block de Behar	Instituto de Profesores Artigas and Universidad de la República Uruguay	Literary criticism and the media of mass communication		
Humanities	Latin American Literature	Saúl Yurkievich	Paris VIII	Edition of the lost manuscripts of Julio Cortázar		
Humanities	Music Research	Jorge Velazco	Universidad Nacional Autónoma de México			
Natural Sciences	Astronomy & Astrophysics	Igor Félix Mirabel	CONICET	Research at California Institute of Technology		
Natural Sciences	Chemistry	Elsa Beatriz Abuin	Universidad de Santiago de Chile	Research at the University of Ottawa and the University of Rochester		
Natural Sciences	Earth Science	Víctor Alberto Ramos	Universidad de Buenos Aires			
Natural Sciences	Molecular & Cellular Biology	Pedro E. León Azofeifa	Universidad de Costa Rica	Molecular studies with DNA from patients with Monge's deafness		
Natural Sciences	Molecular & Cellular Biology	Jaime Mas-Oliva	Universidad Nacional Autónoma de México	Regulatory role of cholesterol on membrane function		
Natural Sciences	Molecular & Cellular Biology	Esther Orozco	CINVESTAV			
Natural Sciences	Neuroscience	Luciano Debeljuk	Universidad de Buenos Aires	Role of brain peptides on the control of prolactin and gonadotropin secretion		
Natural Sciences	Organismic Biology & Ecology	Douglas Y. Shapiro	Universidad de Puerto Rico			
Natural Sciences	Physics	Mahir Saleh Hussein	Universidade de São Paulo	Nuclear physics		
Natural Sciences	Physics	Miguel A. Virasoro	Università degli Studi di Roma "La Sapienza"			
Natural Sciences	Plant Science	Renata Wulff	Universidad Central de Venezuela	Maternal effects in plants		
Social Studies	Anthropology & Cultural Studies	Segundo E. Moreno Yánez	Pontificia Universidad Católica del Ecuador	Indigenous religion and colonial Christianity in the Andes of Ecuador		
Social Studies	Political Science	Adolfo Gilly	Universidad Nacional Autónoma de México			

== See also ==
- Guggenheim Fellowship
- List of Guggenheim Fellowships awarded in 1986
- List of Guggenheim Fellowships awarded in 1988
