= SL-1 =

Nuclear reactor that killed 3 people in 1961

SL-1 nuclear accident
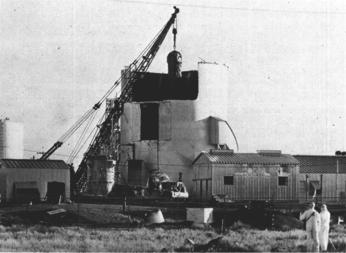
- November 29, 1961: The reactor vessel being removed from the reactor building, which acted substantially like the containment building used in modern nuclear facilities. The 60-ton Manitowoc Model 3900 crane had a 5.25-inch (13.3 cm) steel shield with a 9-inch (23 cm) thick lead glass window to protect the operator.
- Date: January 3, 1961
- Location: National Reactor Testing Station, west of Idaho Falls, Idaho, U.S.; 43.5182°N 112.8237°W
- Outcome: INES Level 4 (accident with local consequences)
- Deaths: 3
- Location in the United States Location in Idaho

Stationary Low-Power Reactor Number One, also known as SL-1, initially the Argonne Low Power Reactor (ALPR), was a United States Army experimental nuclear reactor at the National Reactor Testing Station (NRTS) in Idaho about forty miles (65 km) west of Idaho Falls, now the Idaho National Laboratory. It operated from 1958 to 1961, when an accidental explosion killed three plant operators, leading to changes in reactor design. This is the only U.S. reactor accident to have caused immediate deaths.

Part of the Army Nuclear Power Program, SL-1 was a prototype for reactors intended to provide electrical power and heat for small, remote military facilities, such as radar sites near the Arctic Circle, and those in the DEW Line. The design power was 3 MW (thermal), but some 4.7 MW tests had been performed in the months before the accident. Useful power output was 200 kW electrical and 400 kW for space heating.

On January 3, 1961, at 9:01 pm MST, an operator fully withdrew the central control rod, a component designed to absorb neutrons in the reactor's core. This caused the reactor to go from shut down to prompt critical. Within four milliseconds, the core power level reached nearly 20 GW.

The intense heat from the nuclear reaction expanded the water inside the core, producing extreme water hammer and causing water, steam, reactor components, debris, and fuel to vent from the top of the reactor. As the water struck the top of the reactor vessel, it propelled the vessel to the ceiling of the reactor room. A supervisor who had been on top of the reactor lid was impaled by an expelled control rod shield plug and pinned to the ceiling. Other materials struck the two other operators, mortally injuring them as well.

The accident released about 1,100 curies (41 TBq) of fission products into the atmosphere, including the isotopes of xenon, isotopes of krypton, strontium-91, and yttrium-91 detected in the tiny town of Atomic City, Idaho. It also released about 80 curies (3.0 TBq) of iodine-131. This was not considered significant, due to the reactor's location in the remote high desert of Eastern Idaho.

A memorial plaque for the three men was erected in 2022 at the Experimental Breeder Reactor site.

== Design and operations ==
From 1954 to 1955, the U.S. Army had been evaluating their need for nuclear reactor plants that would be operable in remote regions of the Arctic. The reactors were to replace diesel generators and boilers that provided electricity and space heating for the Army's radar stations. The Army Reactors Branch had written guidelines for the project and hired Argonne National Laboratory (ANL) to design, build, and test a prototype reactor plant to be called the Argonne Low Power Reactor (ALPR). Some of the more important criteria included:

- All components able to be transported by air
- All components limited to packages measuring 7.5 by 9 by 20 feet (2.3 m × 2.7 m × 6.1 m) and weighing 20,000 pounds (9,100 kg)
- Use of standard components
- Minimal on-site construction
- Simplicity and reliability
- Adaptable to the Arctic permafrost region
- 3-year fuel operating lifetime per core loading

A classified 1956 preliminary design study, using BORAX-III as a basis, calculated the total construction cost for the prototype reactor to be $228,789. This estimate for just the reactor and its components did not include any of the buildings or the rest of the reactor plant.

The prototype was constructed at the National Reactor Testing Station west of Idaho Falls from July 1957 to July 1958. It went critical for the first time on August 11, 1958, became operational on October 24, and was formally dedicated on December 2, 1958.

The 3 MW (thermal) boiling water reactor (BWR) used 93.20% highly enriched uranium fuel. It operated with natural circulation, using light water as a coolant (vs. heavy water) and moderator. The circulating water system operated at 300 pounds per square inch (2,100 kPa) flowing through fuel plates of uranium–aluminum alloy.

The plant was turned over to the Army for training and operating experience in December 1958 after extensive testing, with Combustion Engineering Incorporated (CEI) acting as the lead contractor beginning February 5, 1959.

CEI was responsible for the actual operation of the SL-1 reactor, for the routine training of military personnel and for developmental research programs.

The Contractor provided at the site a Project Manager, Operations Supervisor, a Test Supervisor, and a technical staff of approximately six personnel. In recent months, the Project Manager spent approximately half time at the site and half time at the contractor's office in Connecticut. In his absence, either the Operations Supervisor or the Test Supervisor was assigned as the Project Manager.

... It was understood, as indicated by testimony before the Board, that CEI would provide supervision on any shifts when non-routine work was carried out.

... the AEC's Idaho Office and the Army Reactors Office clearly believed that the addition of night supervisors when only routine work was involved would defeat a part of the purpose of operating the reactor under the existing arrangement, i.e., to obtain plant operating experience with only military personnel.

— Report on the SL-1 Incident, January 3, 1961, pp. 6–7

Trainees in the Army Reactor Training Program included members of the Army, called cadre, who were the primary plant operators. Many maritime civilians also trained along with a few Air Force and Navy personnel. While plant operation was generally done by the cadre in two-man crews, development of the reactor was supervised directly by CEI staff. CEI decided to perform development work on the reactor as recent as the latter half of 1960 in which the reactor was to be operated at 4.7 MW_{thermal} for a "PL-1 condenser test". As the reactor core aged and boron neutron absorber strips corroded and flaked off, CEI calculated that about 18% of the boron in the core had been lost. On November 11, 1960, CEI installed cadmium sheets (also a neutron absorber) "to several tee slot positions to increase reactor shutdown margin".

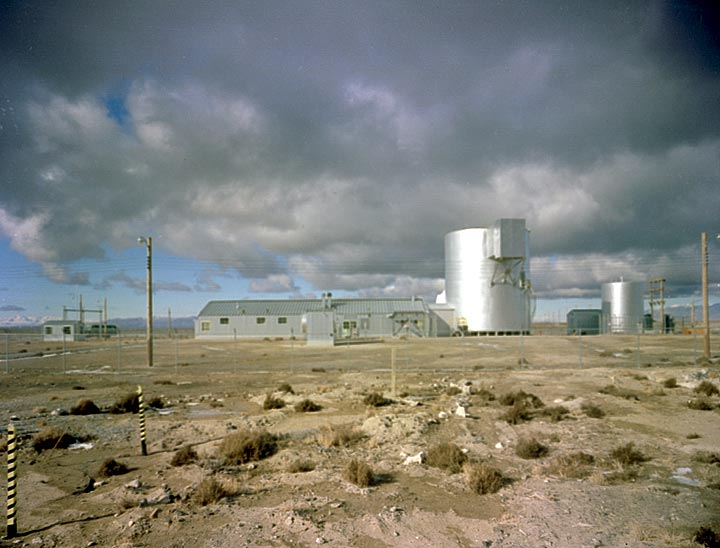
The ALPR before the accident. The large cylindrical building holds the nuclear reactor embedded in gravel at the bottom, the main operating area or operating floor in the middle, and the condenser fan room near the top. Miscellaneous support and administration buildings surround it.

Most of the plant equipment was in a cylindrical steel reactor building known as ARA-603 and SL-1 603. It was 38.5 feet (11.7 m) in diameter with an overall height of 48 feet (15 m), and was made of plate steel, most of which had a thickness of 1/4 inch (6.4 mm). Access to the building was provided by an ordinary door through an enclosed exterior stairwell from ARA-602, the Support Facilities Building. An emergency exit door led to an exterior stairwell to the ground level. The reactor building was not a pressure-type containment shell as would have been used for reactors located in populated areas. Nevertheless, the building was able to contain most of the radioactive particles released by the eventual explosion.

The reactor core structure was built to hold 59 fuel assemblies, one startup neutron source assembly, and nine control rods. The actual core in use had 40 fuel elements and five active control rods. The five active rods were in the shape of a plus symbol (+) in cross section: one in the center (Rod Number 9), and four on the periphery of the active core (Rods 1, 3, 5, and 7). The control rods were made of 60 mils (1.5 mm) thick cadmium, clad with 80 mils (2.0 mm) of aluminum. They had an overall span of 14 inches (36 cm) and an effective length of 32 inches (81 cm). The 40 fuel assemblies were composed of nine fuel plates each. The plates were 120 mils (3.0 mm) thick, consisting of 50 mils (1.3 mm) of uranium–aluminum alloy "meat" covered by 35 mils (0.89 mm) of X-8001 aluminum cladding. The meat was 25.8 inches (66 cm) long and 3.5 inches (8.9 cm) wide. The water gap between fuel plates was 310 mils (7.9 mm). Water channels within the control rod shrouds was 0.5 inches (13 mm). The initial loading of the 40-assembly core contained 31 pounds (14 kg) of highly enriched (93.2%) U-235.

With 2/3 the maximum fuel assemblies but only 55 percent the number of control rods, the reactor was more active than in its maximum configuration. The centre is the most active region and this configuration so accentuated this that the four outer control rods were not even used in the smaller core after tests concluded they were not necessary. In the operating SL-1 core, Rods 2, 4, 6, and 8 were dummy rods, had newly installed cadmium shims, or were filled with test sensors, and were shaped like the capital letter T. The effort to minimize the size of the core gave an abnormally-large reactivity worth to Rod 9, the center control rod, meaning that any irregular handling might result in sudden extreme changes in the reactor's total flux and heat generation.

== Accident and response ==
On Tuesday, January 3, 1961, SL-1 was being prepared for restart after a shutdown of 11 days over the holidays. The crew performing the restart procedure consisted of Army Specialist John A. Byrnes (reactor operator, age 22) and Navy Seabee Construction Electrician First Class (CE1) Richard C. Legg (age 26; shift supervisor), with Army Specialist Richard Leroy McKinley (age 27) as an observing reactor operator in training.

Maintenance procedures required that rods be manually withdrawn a few inches to reconnect each one to its drive mechanism. As it was later established, at 9:01 pm MST, Byrnes withdrew Rod 9 too far, causing SL-1 to go prompt critical. In four milliseconds, the heat generated by the resulting enormous power excursion caused fuel inside the core to melt and to explosively vaporize along with some of the reactor's water. The expanding fuel plates produced an extreme pressure wave that blasted steam and the remaining water upward, striking the top of the reactor vessel with a peak pressure of 10,000 pounds per square inch (69,000 kPa). The slug of water was propelled at 160 feet per second (49 m/s) with average pressure of around 500 pounds per square inch (3,400 kPa). This extreme water hammer propelled the entire reactor vessel upward at 27 feet per second (8.2 m/s), while the shield plugs were ejected at 85 feet per second (26 m/s). With six holes on the top of the reactor vessel, high-pressure water and steam sprayed the entire room with radioactive debris from the damaged core. A later investigation concluded that the 26,000-pound (12,000 kg) (or thirteen short tons) vessel had jumped 9 feet 1 inch (2.77 m), parts of it striking the ceiling of the reactor building before settling back into its original location, and depositing insulation and gravel on the operating floor. If the vessel's #5 seal housing had not hit the overhead crane, it would have risen about ten feet (3 m). The excursion, steam explosion, and vessel movement took two to four seconds.

The Board of Investigation of the Atomic Energy Commission established that Byrnes was killed instantly when a rib fractured in the blast punctured his heart. Legg, the shift supervisor, was standing on top of the reactor vessel when the No. 7 shield plug was forcefully ejected and impaled him through his groin and exited his shoulder, pinning him to the ceiling, instantly killing him. McKinley had been standing nearby both men and was severely injured, but was still alive when found by rescuers, though unconscious, bleeding and in deep shock. Extracting him took two hours; he would succumb to his injuries in the ambulance on his way to the hospital.

Autopsy also confirmed the timeline: Byrnes and Legg died instantly, while McKinley showed signs of diffuse bleeding within his scalp, indicating he survived about two hours before succumbing to his wounds.

=== Reactor principles and events ===
Early press reports indicated that the explosion may have been due to a chemical reaction, but that was ruled out quickly. Fast neutron activation had occurred to various materials in the room, indicating a nuclear power excursion.

In a thermal-neutron reactor such as SL-1, neutrons are moderated (slowed down) to control the nuclear fission process and increase the likelihood of fission with U-235 fuel. Without sufficient moderation, cores such as SL-1 would be unable to sustain a nuclear chain reaction. When the moderator is removed from the core, the chain reaction attenuates (dies down). Water, when used as a moderator, is maintained under high pressure to ensure it remains liquid under heat absorption; steam formation in the channels around the nuclear fuel does not moderate neutrons effectively and would suppress the fission chain reaction.

Another control is the effect of the delayed neutrons on the chain reaction in the core. Most neutrons (the prompt neutrons) are produced nearly instantaneously by the fission of U-235. But a few —approximately 0.7 percent in a U-235-fueled reactor operating at steady-state— are produced through the relatively slow radioactive decay of certain fission products. (These fission products are trapped inside the fuel plates in close proximity to the uranium-235 fuel.) This delayed production of a fraction of the neutrons enables reactor power changes to be controlled on a time scale amenable to humans and machinery.

In the case of an ejected control assembly or neutron absorber, it is possible for the reactor to become critical on the prompt neutrons alone (i.e. prompt critical). When the reactor is prompt critical, the time to double the power is of the order of 10 microseconds. The duration necessary for temperature to follow the power level depends on the design of the reactor core. Typically, the coolant temperature lags behind the power by 3 to 5 seconds in a conventional LWR. In the SL-1 design, it was about 6 milliseconds before steam formation started.

SL-1 was built with a main central control rod that could produce a very large excess reactivity if it were completely removed, partly due to the decision to load only 40 of the 59 fuel assemblies with nuclear fuel, making the prototype reactor core more active in the center. In normal operation, control rods are withdrawn just far enough to generate sufficient reactivity for a sustained nuclear reaction and power generation. In this accident, however, the additional reactivity was enough to take the reactor prompt critical within an estimated 4 milliseconds. That was too fast for the heat from the fuel to permeate the aluminum cladding and boil enough water to fully stop the power growth in all parts of the core via negative moderator temperature and void feedback.

Post-accident analysis concluded that the final control method (i.e., dissipation of the prompt critical state and the end of the sustained nuclear chain reaction) occurred by means of catastrophic core disassembly: destructive melting, vaporization, and consequent conventional explosive expansion of the parts of the reactor core where the greatest amount of heat was being produced most quickly. It was estimated that this core heating and vaporization process happened in about 7.5 milliseconds, before enough steam had been formed to shut down the reaction, beating the steam shutdown by a few milliseconds. A key statistic makes it clear why the core blew apart: the reactor designed for a 3 MW power output operated momentarily at a peak of about 20 GW, a power density over 6,000 times higher than its safe operating limit. This criticality accident is estimated to have produced 4.4 × 10^{18} fissions, or about 133 megajoules (32 kilograms of TNT) energy.

=== Events after the power excursion ===
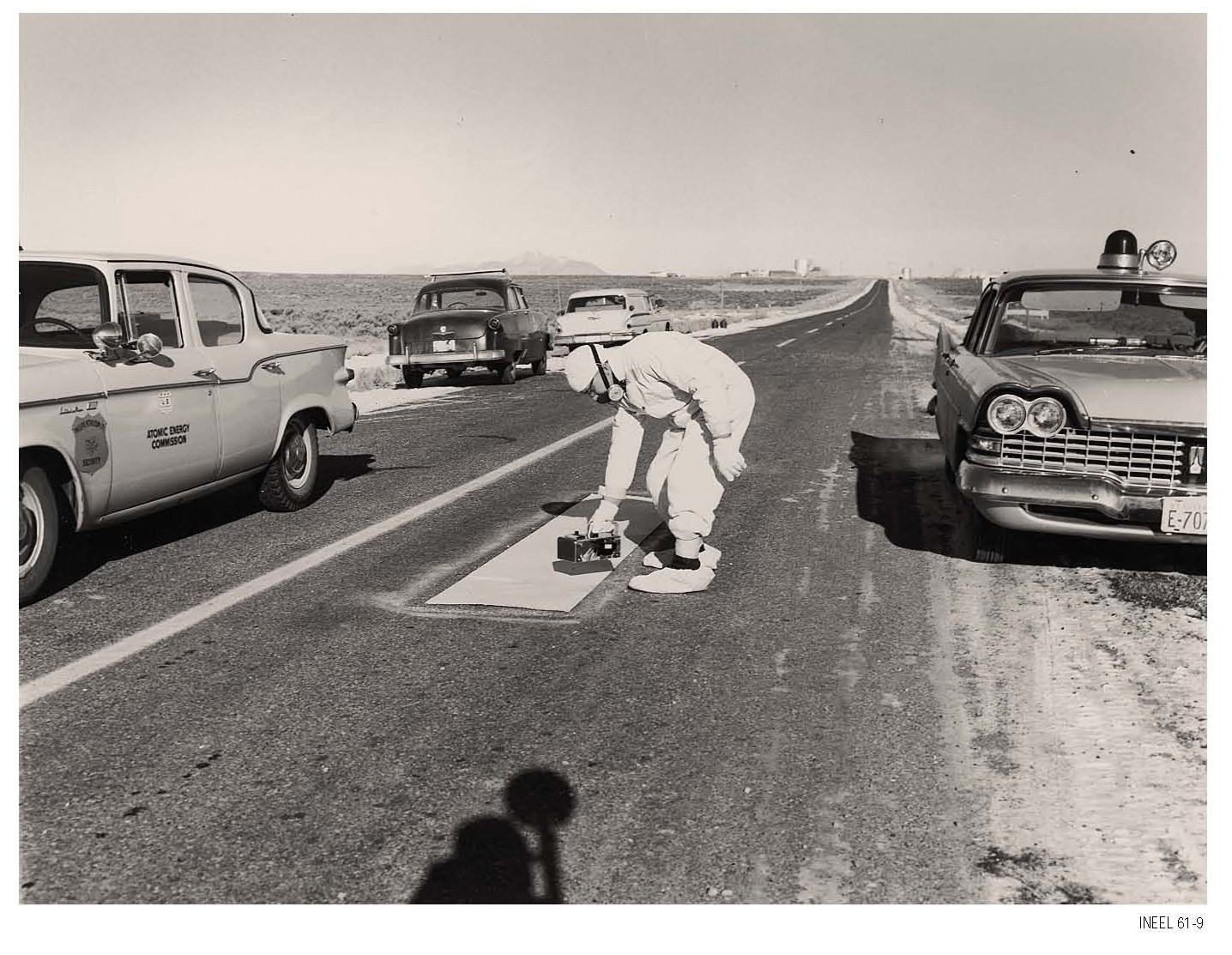
Checking for radioactive contamination on nearby Highway 20

Heat sensors above the reactor set off an alarm at the NRTS security facility at 9:01 pm MST, the time of the accident. False alarms had occurred in the morning and afternoon that same day. The response team of six firemen (Ken Dearden, assistant chief; Mel Hess, lieutenant; Bob Archer; Carl Johnson; Egon Lamprecht; Gerald Stuart; Vern Conlon) arrived nine minutes later, expecting another false alarm. They noticed nothing unusual at first, with only a little steam rising from the building, normal for the cold 6 °F (−14 °C) night. The firefighters, unable to hail anyone inside the SL-1 facility, had a security guard open the gate for them. They donned their Scott Air-Paks, and arrived at the Support Facilities Building (SL-1 602, a 1-story building that connects to the reactor building and has the control room) to investigate.

The building appeared normal, but was unoccupied. Three mugs of warm coffee were in the break room, and three jackets were hanging nearby. They entered the reactor control room and noticed a radiation warning light. Some of the men decided to investigate the reactor building, SL-1 603. It is reached by a connecting hallway and stairs that are near the control room.

Their handheld radiation detector jumped sharply above its maximum range as they were climbing the stairs to SL-1's reactor operating floor level. This prompted a retreat for a second radiation detector. The second radiation detector also maxed out at its 200 röntgens per hour (R/hr) scale as they ascended again. First responders would later report several attempts to penetrate the previously unfathomable high radiation fields, which were met with confusion due to their inexperience and their limited training. No fireman training had ever covered such a high radiation field for first responders. However, they persisted in the face of extreme danger, climbing the stairs and looking briefly into the reactor room before withdrawing.

At 9:17 pm, a health physicist arrived; he and Assistant Chief Moshberger, both wearing air tanks and masks with positive pressure in the mask to force out any potential contaminants, approached the reactor building stairs. Their detectors read 25 röntgens per hour (R/hr) as they started up the stairs, and they withdrew. Finding a higher-scale ion chamber detector, the pair reached the top of the stairs to look inside the reactor room for the three missing men. Their Jordan Radector AG-500 meter pegged at 500 R/hr on the way up. They saw a dim, wet operating floor strewn with rocks and steel punchings, twisted metal, and debris scattered.

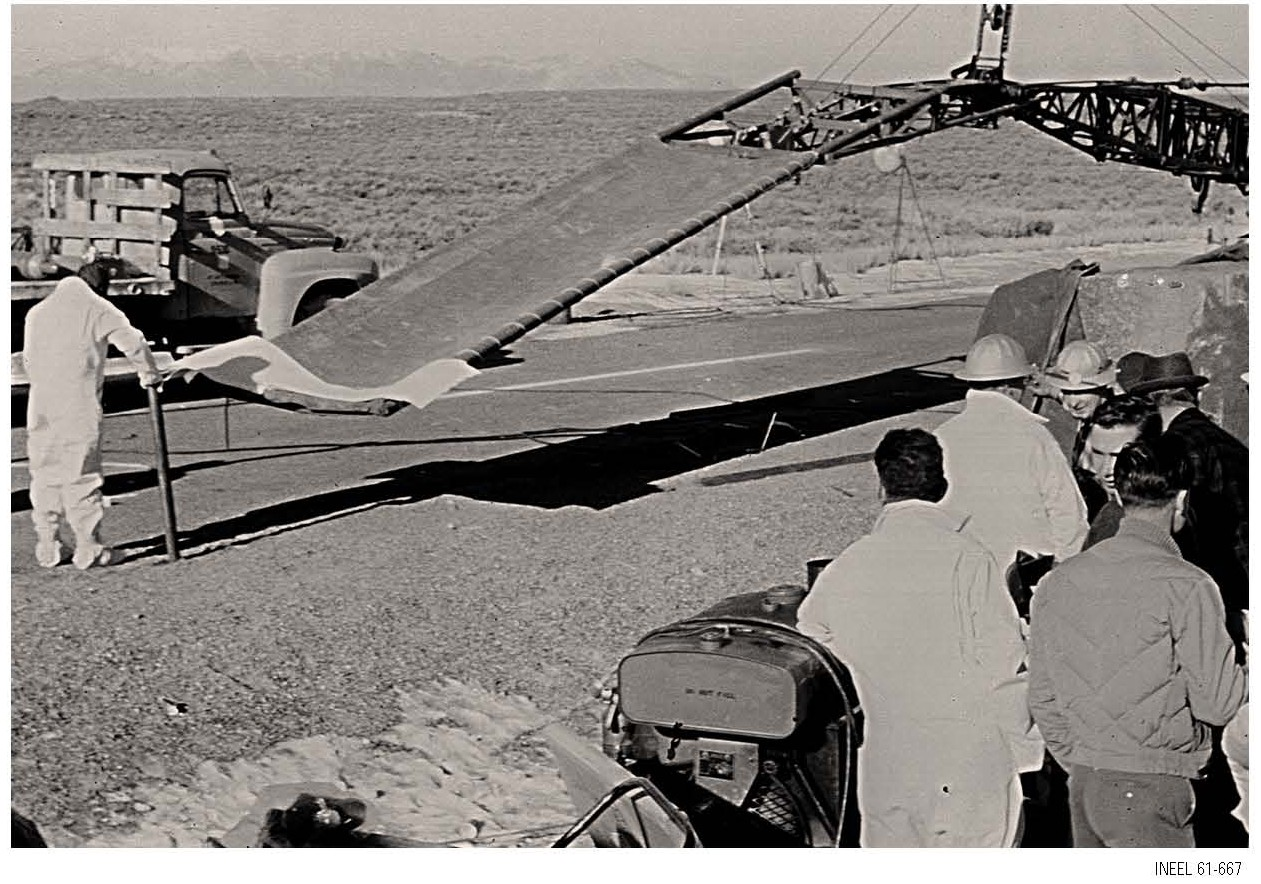
The stretcher rig. Army volunteers from a special Chemical Radiological Unit at Dugway Proving Ground practiced before a crane inserted the rig into the SL-1 reactor building to collect the body of the man (Legg) pinned to the ceiling directly above the reactor vessel.

Coming from nearby Idaho Falls, the lead SL-1 health physicist, Ed Vallario, and Paul Duckworth, the SL-1 Operations Supervisor, arrived at SL-1 around 10:30 pm. The two donned air packs and went quickly into the administration building, through the support building, and up the stairs to the reactor floor. Halfway up the stairs, Vallario heard McKinley moaning. Finding him and a second operator on the floor who appeared to be dead, the two decided to return to the checkpoint and get help for the bleeding McKinley.

The two were joined by three health physicists who donned air packs and went with them back to the reactor floor. The masks on their air packs were fogging up, limiting visibility. McKinley was moving slightly, but his body was partially covered with metal debris, which the rescuers had to remove in order to carry him with a stretcher. Vallario also moved debris in his attempt to find the missing crewman. Byrnes was partially covered with steel pellets and blood. Another man checked for Byrnes' pulse and announced that he was dead.

Three men attempted to remove McKinley via the outside stairs, sending one man outside to meet them with a truck. But after carrying McKinley across the operating floor to the exit, they discovered equipment blocking the emergency exit door. This forced the rescuers to reverse course and use the main stairs.

During the movement of McKinley, two men had their Scott Air-Paks freeze up and cease to work. Duckworth evacuated due to the malfunction, while Vallario removed his mask and breathed contaminated air to complete the evacuation of McKinley. The rescue took about three minutes.

The evacuation of McKinley turned quickly into a major radiological problem. McKinley was first shuttled into a panel truck and then into the back of an ambulance. The on-call nurse, Helen Leisen, tending to the patient in the back of the ambulance, heard at least a faint breath, perhaps his last. But before the vehicle made it to nearby Highway 20, the AEC doctor had the nurse evacuate and, entering the ambulance, found no pulse. He pronounced the man dead at 11:14 pm. The contaminated ambulance, with the body of McKinley, was driven out into the desert and abandoned for several hours.

Four men had entered into the reactor building at 10:38 pm and found the third man. Legg was discovered last because he was pinned to the ceiling above the reactor by a shield plug and not easily recognizable.

Extensive decontamination was conducted that night. About 30 of the first responders took showers, scrubbed their hands with potassium permanganate, and changed their clothes. The body in the ambulance was later disrobed and returned to the ambulance, which took it to a nearby facility for storage and autopsy.

On the night of January 4, a team of six volunteers worked in pairs to recover Byrnes' body from the SL-1 operating floor. It was taken, also by ambulance, to the same facility.

After four days of planning, the third body, by far the most contaminated, was retrieved. Modifications to the reactor room had to be performed by a welder inside a lead shielded box attached to a crane. On January 9, in relays of two at a time, a team of ten men, allowed no more than 65 seconds exposure each, used sharp hooks on the end of long poles to pull Legg's body free of the No. 7 shield plug, dropping it onto a 5-by-20-foot (1.5 by 6.1 m) stretcher attached to a crane outside the building.

Radioactive copper ^{64}Cu from a cigarette lighter screw on McKinley and a brass watch band buckle from Byrnes both proved that the reactor had indeed gone prompt critical. This was confirmed with several other readings, including gold ^{198}Au from Legg's wedding ring. Nuclear accident dosimeters inside the reactor plant and particles of uranium from the victim's clothes also provided evidence of the excursion. In an unusual finding for an autopsy, hair samples taken from the head and pubis of the victims were analyzed to suggest their relative positions during the reactor excursion and to estimate the number of fissions using Phosphorus-32 activity. Before these discoveries of neutron-activated elements in the men's belongings and in their hair, scientists had doubted that a nuclear excursion had occurred, believing the reactor was inherently safe. Strontium-91, a major fission product, was also found with the uranium particles. Air sampling downstream of the reactor discovered fission products, as well. All of these findings ruled out early speculation that a chemical explosion caused the accident and helped establish the energy released by the excursion.

Some sources and eyewitness accounts confuse the names and positions of each victim. In Idaho Falls: The Untold Story of America's First Nuclear Accident, the author indicates that the rescue teams identified Byrnes as the man found still alive, believing that Legg's body was the one found next to the reactor shield and recovered the night after the accident, and that McKinley was impaled by the control rod to the ceiling directly above the reactor. The misidentification, caused by the severe blast injuries to the victims, was rectified during the autopsies conducted by Clarence Lushbaugh, but this caused confusion for some time as the autopsy was classified until the 1990s.

The seven rescuers who carried McKinley and received Carnegie Hero awards from the Carnegie Hero Fund in 1962 were: Edward Vallario, SL-1 Health Physicist; Paul Duckworth, the SL-1 Operations Supervisor; Sidney Cohen, the SL-1 Test supervisor; William Rausch, SL-1 Assistant Operations Supervisor; William Gammill, the on-duty AEC Site Survey Chief; Lovell Callister, health physicist, and Delos Richards, health physics technician.

== Cause ==
One of the required maintenance procedures called for Rod 9 to be manually withdrawn about four inches (10 cm) in order to attach it to the automated control mechanism from which it had been disconnected. Post-accident calculations, as well as examination of scratches on Rod 9, estimate that it had actually been withdrawn about twenty inches (51 cm), causing the reactor to go prompt critical and triggering the steam explosion.

The most common theories proposed for the withdrawal of the rod are (1) sabotage or suicide by one of the operators, (2) a murder–suicide involving an affair with the wife of one of the other operators, (3) inadvertent withdrawal of the main control rod, or (4) an intentional attempt to "exercise" the rod (to make it travel more smoothly within its sheath). The maintenance logs do not address what the technicians were attempting to do, and thus the actual cause of the accident will never be known. However, it seems unlikely that it was a suicide.

Post-accident experiments were conducted with an identically weighted mock control rod to determine whether it was possible or feasible for one or two men to have withdrawn Rod 9 by 20 inches. Experiments included a simulation of the possibility that the 48-pound (22 kg) central rod was stuck and one man freed it himself, reproducing the scenario that investigators considered the best explanation: Byrnes broke the control rod loose and withdrew it accidentally, killing all three men. When testing the theory that Rod 9 was rapidly withdrawn manually, three men took part in timed trials and their efforts were compared to the energy of the nuclear excursion that had occurred.

A spare SL-1 control rod actuator assembly was used for mock-up on which the speed of manual rod withdrawal was measured for several subjects. The equipment is the same as that on SL-1 except for the control rod, which is simulated by a weight to give a total movable load of 84 lb, the net weight of the SL-1 movable assembly in water. [...] The test was conducted by instructing the subject to lift the rod as rapidly as possible, while an electric timer, measured the elapsed time from beginning of rod motion to some predetermined distance of withdrawal. Distances up to 30 inches were measured.

[...]

The above reasoning indicates that the required rate of rod withdrawal to produce a period as short as 5.3 milliseconds was well within the limits of human capability.

— IDO-19300, SL-1 Reactor Accident on January 3, 1961, Interim Report, May 15, 1961

At SL-1, control rods would sometimes get stuck in the control rod channel. Numerous procedures were conducted to evaluate control rods to ensure they were operating properly. There were rod drop tests and scram tests of each rod, in addition to periodic rod exercising and rod withdrawals for normal operation. From February 1959 to November 18, 1960, there were 40 cases of a stuck control rod for scram and rod drop tests and about a 2.5% failure rate. From November 18 to December 23, 1960, there was a dramatic increase in stuck rods, with 23 in that time period and a 13.0% failure rate. Besides these test failures, there were an additional 21 rod-sticking incidents from February 1959 to December 1960; four of these had occurred in the last month of operation during routine rod withdrawal. Rod 9 had the best operational performance record even though it was operated more frequently than any of the other rods.

Rod sticking has been attributed to misalignment, corrosion product build-up, bearing wear, clutch wear, and drive mechanism seal wear. Many of the failure modes that caused a stuck rod during tests (like bearing and clutch wear) would apply only to a movement performed by the control rod drive mechanism. Since the No. 9 rod is centrally located, its alignment may have been better than Nos. 1, 3, 5, and 7, which were more prone to sticking. After the accident, logbooks and former plant operators were consulted to determine if there had been any rods stuck during the reassembly operation that Byrnes was performing. One person had performed this about 300 times, and another 250 times; neither had ever felt a control rod stick when being manually raised during this procedure. Furthermore, no one had ever reported a stuck rod during manual reconnection.

During congressional hearings in June 1961, the SL-1 Project Manager, W. B. Allred, admitted that the lack of supervision by CEI of SL-1 plant operation on an "around-the-clock basis" was because the Atomic Energy Commission (AEC) had rejected the idea "for budget reasons". Allred was also grilled on the matter of increased rod sticking between November 16, 1960, and the final shutdown on December 23. Of the increase, Allred stated, "I was not completely aware of significant increase" and, "I was not aware that this sharp increase had occurred." When asked who was the person responsible for informing him of the sticking problem, Allred said that Paul Duckworth, the SL-1 Operations Supervisor, should have reported this to him but did not. When pressed, Allred said that if he had known of the increased control rod sticking, he "would have shut the plant down for more detailed examination".

The mechanical and material evidence, combined with the nuclear and chemical evidence, forced them to believe that the central control rod had been withdrawn very rapidly. ... The scientists questioned the [former operators of SL-1]: "Did you know that the reactor would go critical if the central control rod were removed?" Answer: "Of course! We often talked about what we would do if we were at a radar station and the Russians came. We'd yank it out."

— Susan M. Stacy, Proving the Principle, 2000

== Consequences ==
The accident caused SL-1's design to be abandoned and future reactors to be designed so that a single control rod removal could not produce very large excess reactivity. Today this is known as the "one stuck rod" criterion and requires complete shutdown capability even with the most reactive rod stuck in the fully withdrawn position. The documentation and procedures required for operating nuclear reactors expanded substantially and became far more formal; procedures that had previously taken two pages expanded to hundreds. Radiation meters were changed to allow higher ranges for emergency response activities.

Although portions of the center of SL-1's core had been vaporized briefly, very little corium was recovered. The fuel plates showed signs of catastrophic destruction leaving voids, but "no appreciable amount of glazed molten material was recovered or observed". Additionally, "There is no evidence of molten material having flowed out between the plates." It is believed that rapid cooling of the core was responsible for the small amount of molten material. There was insufficient heat generated for any corium to reach or penetrate the bottom of the reactor vessel.

The SL-1 reactor building contained most of the radioactivity, but iodine-131 levels on plant buildings downwind reached 50 times background levels during several days of monitoring. Radiation surveys of the Support Facilities Building, for example, indicated high contamination in halls, but light contamination in offices. Radiation exposure limits before the accident were 100 röntgens to save a life and 25 to save valuable property. During the response to the accident, 22 people received doses of 3 to 27 Röntgens full-body exposure. Removal of radioactive waste and disposal of the three bodies eventually exposed 790 people to harmful levels of radiation. In March 1962, the AEC awarded certificates of heroism to 32 participants in the response.

After a pause for evaluation of procedures, the Army continued its use of reactors, operating the Mobile Low-Power Reactor (ML-1), which started full-power operation on February 28, 1963, becoming the smallest nuclear power plant on record to do so. This design was eventually abandoned after corrosion problems. While the tests had shown that nuclear power was likely to have lower total costs, the financial pressures of the Vietnam War caused the Army to favor lower initial costs and it stopped the development of its reactor program in 1965, although the existing reactors continued operating (MH-1A until 1977).

McKinley was buried in Arlington National Cemetery in a double lead-lined casket, encased in concrete and surrounded by a metal vault. A note in the file warned that the body must not be moved.

== Cleanup ==
General Electric was hired to remove the reactor vessel and dismantle and clean up the contaminated buildings at the SL-1 project site. The site was cleaned from 1961 to 1962, removing the bulk of the contaminated debris and burying it. The massive cleanup operation included the transport of the reactor vessel to a nearby "hot shop" for extensive analysis. Other items of less importance were disposed of or transported to decontamination sites for various kinds of cleaning. About 475 people took part in the SL-1 site cleanup, including volunteers from the U.S. Army and the Atomic Energy Commission.

The recovery operation included clearing the operating room floor of radioactive debris. The extremely high radiation areas surrounding the reactor vessel and the fan room directly above it contributed to the difficulty of recovering the reactor vessel. Remotely operated equipment, cranes, boom trucks, and safety precautions had to be developed and tested by the recovery team. Radiation surveys and photographic analysis was used to determine what items needed to be removed from the building first. Powerful vacuum cleaners, operated manually by teams of men, collected vast quantities of debris. The manual overhead crane above the operating floor was used to move numerous heavy objects weighing up to 19,600 pounds (8,900 kg) for them to be dumped out onto the ground outside. Hot spots up to 400 R/hr were discovered and removed from the work area.

With the operating room floor relatively clean and radiation fields manageable, the manual overhead crane was employed to do a trial lift of the reactor vessel. The crane was fitted with a dial-type load indicator and the vessel was lifted a few inches. The successful test found that the estimated 23,000 pounds (10,000 kg) vessel plus an unknown amount of debris weighed about 26,000 pounds (12,000 kg). After removing a large amount of the building structure above the reactor vessel, a 60-ton Manitowoc Model 3900 crane lifted the vessel out of the building into an awaiting transport cask attached to a tractor-trailer combination with a low-boy 60-ton capacity trailer. After raising or removing 45 power lines, phone lines, and guy wires from the proposed roadway, the tractor-trailer, accompanied by numerous observers and supervisors, proceeded at about 10 mph (16 km/h) to the ANP Hot Shop (originally associated with the Aircraft Nuclear Propulsion program), located in a remote area of the NRTS known as Test Area North, about 35 miles (56 km) away.

A burial ground was constructed about 1,600 feet (500 m) northeast of the original site of the reactor. It was opened on May 21, 1961. Burial of the waste helped minimize radiation exposure to the public and site workers that would have resulted from transport of contaminated debris from SL-1 to the Radioactive-Waste Management Complex over 16 miles (26 km) of public highway. The original cleanup of the site took about 24 months. The entire reactor building, contaminated materials from nearby buildings, and soil and gravel contaminated during cleanup operations were buried in the burial ground. The majority of buried materials consist of soils and gravel.

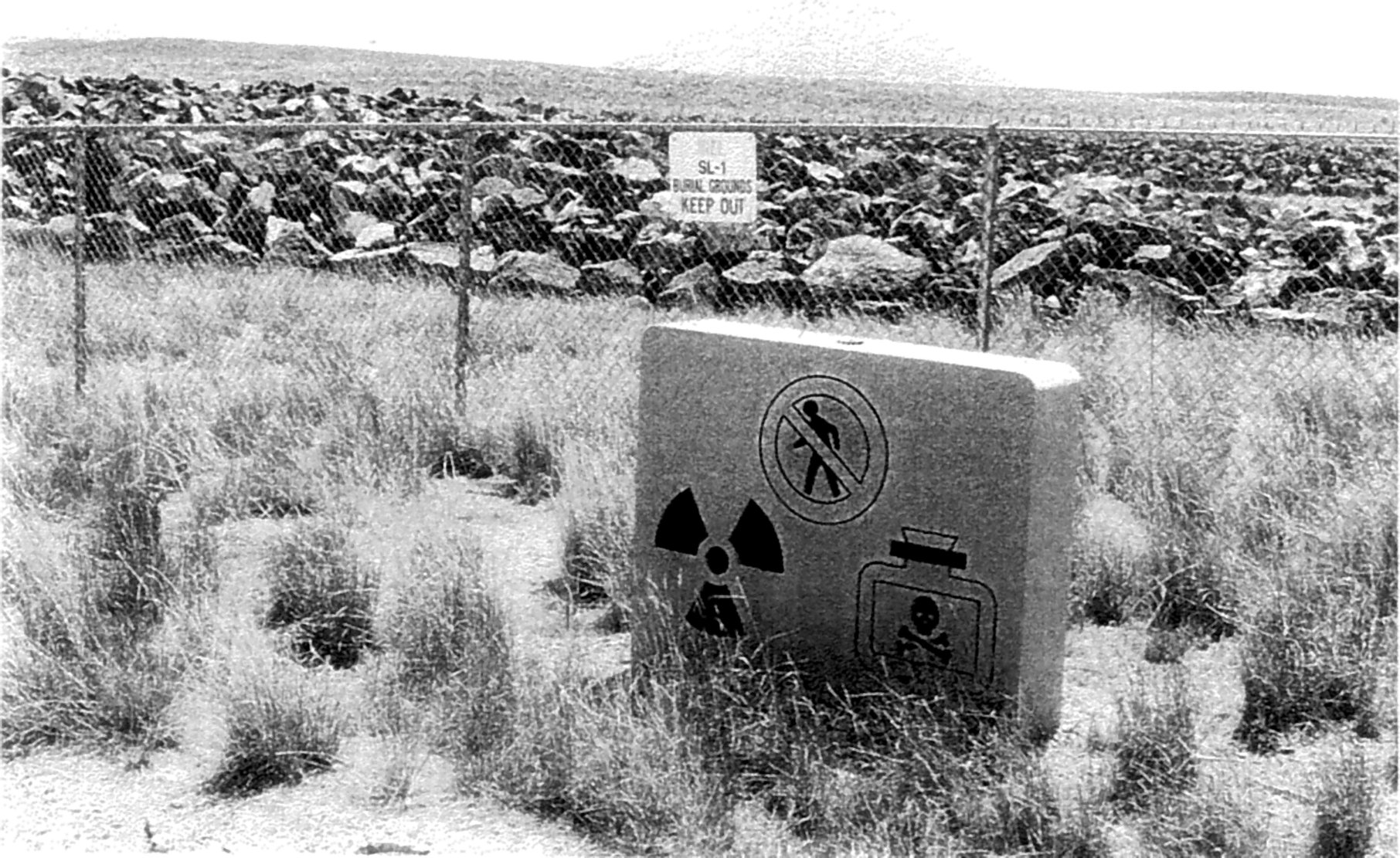
SL-1 burial site in 2003, capped with riprap

Recovered portions of the reactor core, including the fuel and all other parts of the reactor that were important to the accident investigation, were taken to the ANP Hot Shop for study. After the accident investigation was complete, the reactor fuel was sent to the Idaho Chemical Processing Plant for reprocessing. The reactor core minus the fuel, along with the other components sent to the Hot Shop for study, was eventually disposed of at the Radioactive Waste Management Complex.

The remains of SL-1 were buried at 43°31′18″N 112°49′05″W, about 500 metres (1,600 ft) northeast of the original site (about 5 miles north of Atomic City). The burial site consists of three excavations, in which a total volume of 99,000 cubic feet (2,800 m^{3}) of contaminated material was deposited. The excavations were dug as close to basalt as the equipment used would allow and ranges from eight to fourteen feet (2.4 to 4.3 m) in depth. At least two feet (0.61 m) of clean backfill was placed over each excavation. Shallow mounds of soil over the excavations were added at the completion of cleanup activities in September 1962. The site and burial mound are collectively known as United States Environmental Protection Agency Superfund Operable Unit 5-05.

Numerous radiation surveys and cleanup of the surface of the burial ground and surrounding area have been performed in the years since the SL-1 accident. Aerial surveys were performed by EG&G Las Vegas in 1974, 1982, 1990, and 1993. The Radiological and Environmental Sciences Laboratory conducted gamma radiation surveys every three to four years between 1973 and 1987 and every year between 1987 and 1994. Particle-picking at the site was performed in 1985 and 1993. Results from the surveys indicated that cesium-137 and its progeny (decay products) are the primary surface-soil contaminants. During a survey of surface soil in June 1994, "hot spots", areas of higher radioactivity, were found within the burial ground with activities ranging from 0.1 to 50 milliroentgen (mR)/hour. On November 17, 1994, the highest radiation reading measured at 2.5 feet (0.76 m) above the surface at the SL-1 burial ground was 0.5 mR/hour; local background radiation was 0.2 mR/hour. A 1995 assessment by the EPA recommended that a cap be placed over the burial mounds. The primary remedy for SL-1 was to be containment by capping with an engineered barrier constructed primarily of native materials. This remedial action was completed in 2000 and first reviewed by the EPA in 2003.

== Movies and books ==
Animation of the film produced by the Atomic Energy Commission, available from The Internet Archive

The U.S. government produced a film about the accident for internal use in the 1960s. The video was subsequently released and can be viewed at The Internet Archive and YouTube. SL-1 is the title of a 1983 movie, written and directed by Diane Orr and C. Larry Roberts, about the nuclear reactor explosion. Interviews with scientists, archival film, and contemporary footage, as well as slow-motion sequences, are used in the film. The events of the accident are also the subject of one book: Idaho Falls: The untold story of America's first nuclear accident (2003) and 2 chapters in Proving the Principle – A History of The Idaho National Engineering and Environmental Laboratory, 1949–1999 (2000).

In 1975, the anti-nuclear book We Almost Lost Detroit by John G. Fuller was published, referring at one point to the Idaho Falls accident. Prompt Critical is the title of a 2012 short film, viewable on YouTube, written and directed by James Lawrence Sicard, dramatizing the events surrounding the SL-1 accident. A documentary about the accident was shown on the History Channel.

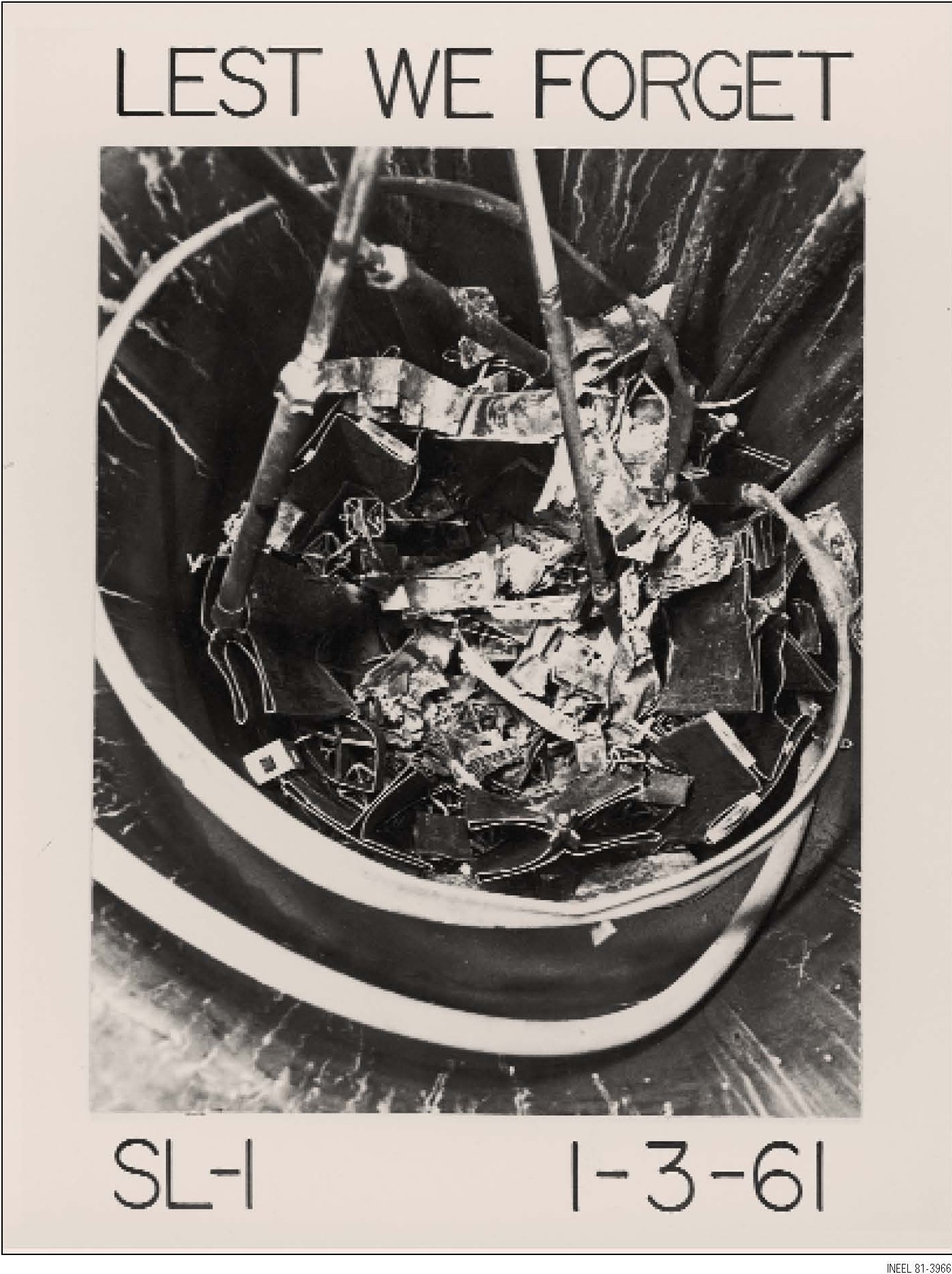
A safety poster designed for engineering offices showing the mangled SL-1 reactor core

Another author, Todd Tucker, studied the accident and published a book detailing the historical aspects of nuclear reactor programs of the U.S. military branches. Tucker used the Freedom of Information Act to obtain reports, including autopsies of the victims, writing in detail how each person died and how parts of their bodies were severed, analyzed, and buried as radioactive waste. The autopsies were performed by the same pathologist known for his work following the Cecil Kelley criticality accident. Tucker explains the reasoning behind the autopsies and the severing of victims' body parts, one of which gave off 1,500 R/hour on contact. Because the SL-1 accident killed all three of the military operators on site, Tucker calls it "the deadliest nuclear reactor incident in U.S. history."

== See also ==
- BORAX experiments, 1953–54, which proved that the transformation of water to steam would safely limit a boiling water reactor power excursion, similar to that in this incident.
- International Nuclear Event Scale
- List of civilian nuclear accidents
- List of civilian radiation accidents
- List of military nuclear accidents
- List of nuclear reactors
- Nuclear power debate
- Nuclear safety and security
- Radioactive contamination
