= Janet Hamill =

American poet

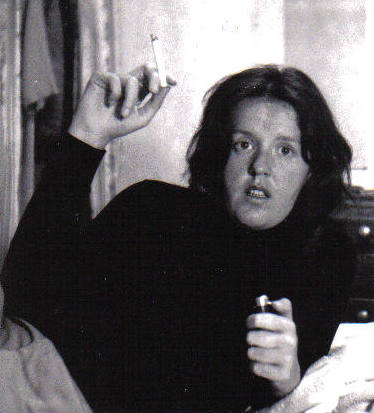
- Hamill photographed by Neil Winokur in 2011
- Born: July 29, 1945 (age 80) Christ Hospital, Jersey City, New Jersey, U.S.
- Occupation: Poet, spoken word artist
- Education: New England College (MFA
- Notable awards: One Voice Work Grant; Ramapo-Catskill Library Program of the Year

Website
- www.janethamill.net

Janet Hamill (born July 29, 1945, in Jersey City, New Jersey) is an American poet and spoken word artist. Her poem "K-E-R-O-U-A-C" was nominated for a Pushcart Prize, and her fifth collection, titled Body of Water, was nominated for the William Carlos Williams Award by the Poetry Society of America.

Her first collection of short fiction, titled Tales from the Eternal Cafe (Three Rooms Press, 2014), was named one of the "Best Books of 2014" by Publishers Weekly.

== Early life and education ==
Hamill was born on July 29, 1945, in Christ Hospital in Jersey City, New Jersey. She spent her first five years in Weehawken, New Jersey, then moved to New Milford, New Jersey, in 1950.

In 1963, she entered Glassboro State College, now Rowan University, in Glassboro, New Jersey, where she earned a BA in English in 1967. At Glassboro, Hamill met lifelong friend and collaborator, musician and poet Patti Smith. Smith and Hamill were both considered campus outcasts and beatniks, but bonded over art and rock and roll on the staff of The Avant, the campus literary magazine, and backstage at the campus theatre, where they were both active.

Janet later received an MFA from New England College, Henniker, NH.

== Career ==
After graduation, Hamill and Patti Smith moved from South Jersey to New York City, where they found their first apartments near the Pratt Institute in Brooklyn. Smith moved in with photographer Robert Mapplethorpe, and Hamill lived a few blocks away on Clinton Ave. In 1968, Hamill moved to the Lower East Side, where she briefly shared an apartment with Smith. For the next 25 years, Lower Manhattan was Hamill's home, and she worked in bookstores and traveled across the U.S. and to Mexico. She took a freighter across the Atlantic and traveled through much of North Africa and Europe, including to Morocco, Egypt, Sudan, Ethiopia, Kenya, and Tanzania.

Upon her return in 1975, Hamill published Troublante, her first book, and became an active member of the downtown literary community. She read at venues, including the Poetry Project at St. Mark's Church in-the-Bowery, and wrote, directed, and acted in Bob Holman’s Poet's Theatre and performed with new wave musician Adele Bertei at the Mudd Club.

A strong proponent of the spoken word, Hamill has read widely in New York City, across the country and in Europe at museums, venues and festivals such as St. Mark's Church, The People's Poetry Gathering, the Walt Whitman Cultural Center, the WORD Festival, the Bowery Poetry Club, the Knitting Factory, CBGB’s Gallery, the Nuyorican Café, Central Park Summer Stage, Lowell Celebrates Kerouac, the Andy Warhol Museum, The Rubin Museum, Cathedral of St. John the Divine, Seattle's Bumbershoot Festival, the Liss Ard Festival in County Cork, Ireland, Patti Smith's Meltdown Festival in London, the Latitude Festival in Southwold, England, and Liverpool's Heartbeats series.

She has released two CDs of spoken word and music in collaboration with the band Lost Ceilings. Flying Nowhere (Yes No Maybe Records, 2000) was produced by Lenny Kaye and executive-produced by Bob Holman; the CD featured cameo performances by Lenny Kaye and Patti Smith. Genie of the Alphabet (Not Records 2005), produced by Janet Hamill and Bob Torsello, featured cameos by Lenny Kaye, Patti Smith, Bob Holman and beat legend David Amram.

In 2018, contemporary Irish composer Ian Wilson adapted Janet's poem "A Thousand Years" to music. The piece, titled "How Goes the Night," after a line from "A Thousand Years," was commissioned by the Glass Farm Ensemble. It had its New York debut at Symphony space on November 17, 2019.

Hamill resides in the Hudson Valley in New York state, where she is a professional tutor for the English Department at SUNY Orange and was a member of the advisory board of the Seligmann Center in Sugar Loaf, New York, an organization located on the estate of surrealist painter Kurt Seligmann.

Hamill is the founder and director of MEGAPHONE, the center's literary program. She taught creative writing workshops at The Poetry Project for Naropa University, New England College, and Seligmann Center. She also has presented workshops in Liverpool and London.

== Works ==
=== Poetry ===
- Troublante, Oliphant Press (1975)
- The Temple, Telephone Books (1980)
- Nostalgia of the Infinite, Ocean View Books (1992)
- Lost Ceilings, Telephone Books, (1999)
- Body of Water, Bowery Books (2008)
- Knock, Spuyten Duyvil (2016)
- Real Fire, Alexandria Quarterly Press (2017)
- A Map of the Heavens: Selected Poems 1975-2017 Spuyten Duyvil (2020)

=== Fiction ===
- Tales from the Eternal Cafe, Three Rooms Press, (2014)

=== CDs ===
- Flying Nowhere (NOT Records), 2000
- Genie of the Alphabet (NOT Records), 2005

=== Grants and awards ===
- One Voice Work Grant, 2001–2011
- Ramapo-Catskill Library Program of the Year, 1999
- Joel Oppenheimer Scholarship, New England College
- Inaugural New Milford, NJ 100th Anniversary Hall of Fame Induction
- Arts and Letters, 2023
- Distinguished Alumni Award, Rowan University, 2024
