= El Funoun Palestinian Popular Dance Troupe =

Palestinian dance troupe, formed in 1979

El Funoun Palestinian Popular Dance Troupe (فرقة الفنون الشعبية الفلسطينية) is a Palestinian dance troupe that was established in 1979. They are also called El Funoun Palestinian Popular Dance Troupe. They currently are based in Ramallah and have a direct mission to "resist the genocide of their people and culture." As of 2021, the dance troupe has between 50 and 230 volunteer members of men women and children. Their members are also both Muslim and Christian. El Funoun translates to 'The Art'.

== Goals/Mission ==
Through the choreography of their dances, they aim to represent Arab-Palestinian traditions. While they perform Dabke, a traditional folkloric dance, they also choreograph different types of dance that also encompass their mission to share their vision of Palestinian dance. Their dances have roots in traditional dances that historically were performed at celebrations and weddings and adapts them for the current context. They aim to appeal to the younger audiences as well and in doing so bring Palestinian culture into the present and let it evolve. They aim to preserve and engage with Palestinian history and traditions through dance and choreography and through performance. Their work in preserving Palestinian culture and creating spaces for Palestinians to engage with their traditional culture and dance through performances, is in opposition to Israeli suppression of Palestinian expression since the Nakba in 1948.

== History ==
El Funoun's first performance was at the Dabke Festival in Birzeit University in 1979. Since 1979, El Funoun has performed over 1,000 times at various venues and festivals, as well as produced shows that bring traditional Palestinian folkloric dance with contemporary dance. Originally, El Funoun consisted solely of male dancers, but in 1981 the group opened itself up to female dancers, which attracted some criticism due to its breaking of cultural norms. The group originally focused solely on dabke, but have since expanded to include other dance styles, as well as performances that mix traditional and contemporary choreography.

In 1986 El Funoun established the "Palestinian Folklore Day", which is an annual celebration that happens every year on October 7 and is celebrated all over Palestine. The dance troupe was also instrumental in establishing the Popular Arts Centre (PAC) in Al-Bireh in the West Bank in 1987, which aims to raise awareness about the arts and create opportunities for community members to participate in the arts.

In the mid-1990s, the group's mission shifted from preservation of Palestinian cultural identity to development of a contemporary Palestinian identity.

From 1992 to 1999 El Funoun dance troupe performed at the Palestine International Festival. In 1997, the dance troupe received the Palestine Award for Popular Folklore.

In 1997, the group staged Zaghareed, which followed a modern Palestinian wedding.

In 2004, the group collaborated with the Belgian group les Ballets C de la B.

In 2011, the group collaborated with choreographer Yoshiko Chuma. A performance based on the collaboration was staged in New York City in 2012, with two members of the troupe participating.

== Performances ==
El Funoun is popular in Palestine and in previous performances would have between 1,000 and 3,000 people at their performances. During COVID-19, they did virtual dance performances.

El Funoun has performed and hosted workshops abroad, in places like Ireland, Malta, and the United Kingdom. They have toured in the United States twice, in 2006 and in 2016.
