= Jon Butler =

American historian

Jon Butler (born June 4, 1940) is a historian and Howard R. Lamar Professor Emeritus of American Studies, History, and Religious Studies at Yale University. He earned his bachelor's and doctoral degrees from the University of Minnesota, and is known for his research on the role of religion in early American history. At Yale, he served as chair of the American Studies Program from 1988 to 1993, the director of the Division of the Humanities from 1997 to 1999, and chair of the Department of History from 1999 to 2004. He was dean of the Graduate School of Arts and Sciences from 2004 to 2010, and also served as interim University Librarian.

Butler has earned numerous awards, including the Beveridge Award of the American Historical Association, the Outler Prize of the American Society of Church History, the Theodore Saloutos Prize of the Immigration History Society, and the Gilbert Chinard Prize of the Society for French Historical Studies. He was also a Guggenheim Fellow and received an honorary Doctor of Science from the University of Minnesota in December 2006. Butler served as president of the Organization of American Historians, 2015–16. He is currently an adjunct research professor at the University of Minnesota College of Liberal Arts, in the Department of History.
