= Kamran Ince =

Turkish-American composer (born 1960)

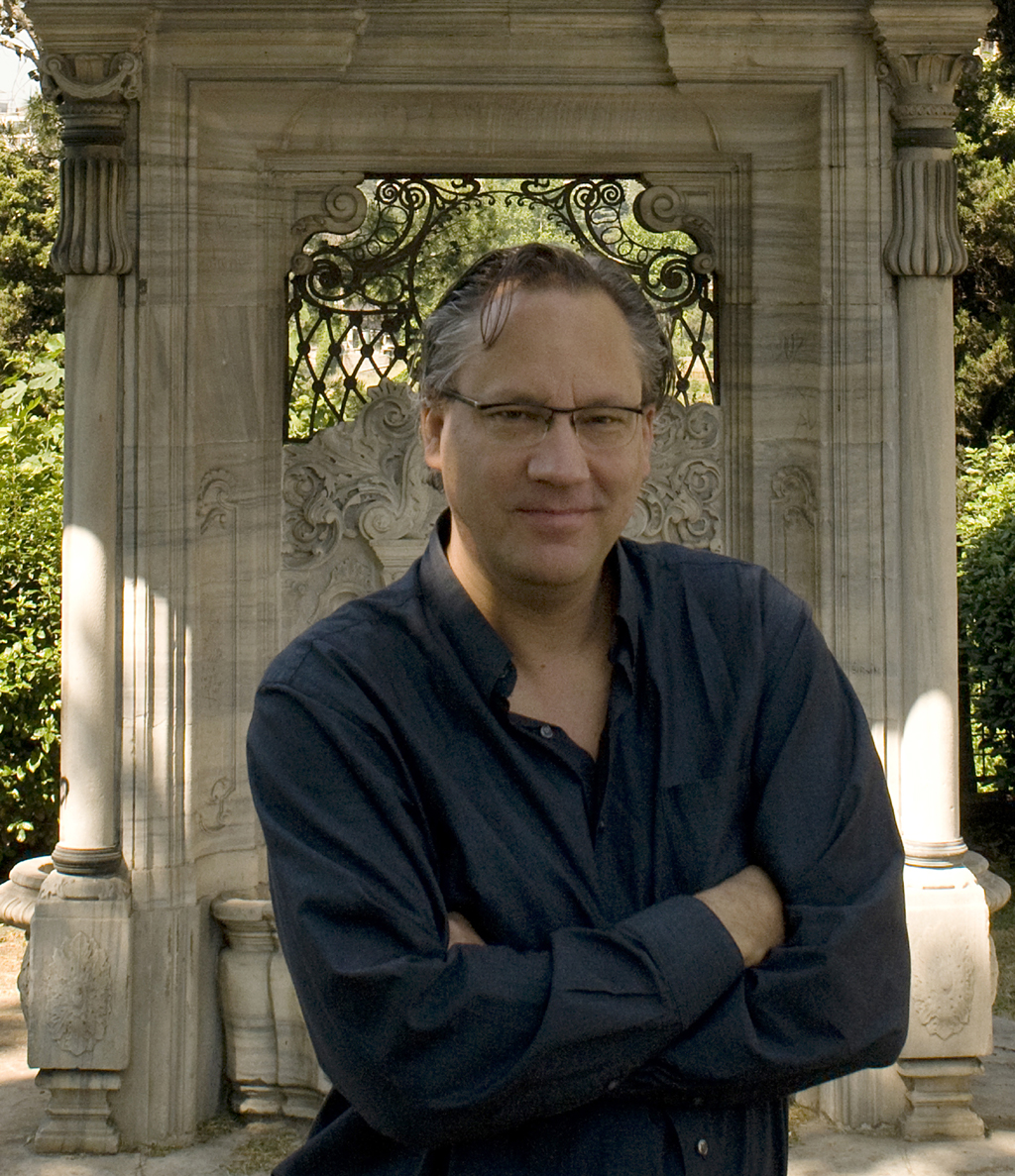

Kamran N. Ince (spelled İnce in Turkish, born May 6, 1960) is a Turkish-American composer. He is the winner of many prestigious awards, including a Rome Prize, a Guggenheim Fellowship, the Lili Boulanger Memorial Prize, and various others. His work has been performed by the Chicago Symphony Orchestra, the BBC Symphony Orchestra, the Prague Symphony Orchestra, the Los Angeles Piano Quartet, the Borusan Istanbul Philharmonic Orchestra, the Netherlands Wind Ensemble, the Milwaukee Opera Theatre, the Arkas Trio, Evelyn Glennie, Lily Afshar, and others, and his recordings can be found on Naxos, EMI, Albany, and Archer Records. He is known today as one of the leading composers of contemporary music.

Born in Glendive, Montana and raised in Turkey, Ince began his studies at age 10 studying cello, piano, and composition at the Ankara State Conservatory. Ince later moved to the United States to study at Oberlin College and Eastman School of Music. His music is exclusively published by Schott Music. In addition to the music he has composed, he has received commissions from the Ford Foundation, the Irish Arts Council, the Fromm Foundation, the Koussevitzky Foundation, the Jerome Foundation, Reader’s Digest, Mavi Jeans, and the Pew Charitable Trust. Ince frequently travels to do exhibitions of his music, including at Rice University's Shepherd School of Music, the Schleswig-Holstein Musik Festival, and the Istanbul International Music Festival.

Ince is one of the most critically acclaimed living composers in the world today. He is currently based in Memphis, Tennessee. He is on the faculty of University of Memphis and Istanbul Technical University.

== Life ==
Ince was born in Glendive, Montana, United States and at the age of six moved with his family to Turkey. He entered the Ankara State Conservatory at the age of ten, in 1971, where he began studying cello and piano, and took composition lessons with İlhan Baran. In 1977 Ince entered the İzmir University where he studied composition with Muammer Sun, but returned to the United States in 1978. He enrolled at the Oberlin College in Ohio in 1980, earning a Bachelor of Music degree in 1982, and went on to complete his master’s and doctoral degrees from the Eastman School of Music in 1984 and 1987. His teachers there included David Burge (piano), Joseph Schwantner, Christopher Rouse, Samuel Adler and Barbara Kolb (composition).

Ince won a Rome Prize and a Guggenheim Fellowship in 1987, and the Lili Boulanger Memorial Prize in 1988. In 1990, he moved to Ann Arbor, Michigan to become a visiting professor at the University of Michigan, and in 1992 joined the faculty of the University of Memphis, where he teaches composition, co-directs the University of Memphis Imagine New Music Festival. In addition, Kamran İnce was one of the founders of the Center for Advanced Studies in Music at the Istanbul Technical University, whose academic staff he has been in since 1999.

== His music ==
Journalist Blair Dedrick described İnce’s music as

characterized by its ability to pinpoint the sonorous strains present in the jagged dissonance of elements such as a smooth cello yearning suddenly broken by an incongruent spatter of drum beats.

His music has been described as post-minimalist, that is, it makes use of near repetition, tonal language, but avoiding traditional tonal functionality, and influence of world music. Indeed, his Concerto for Orchestra, Turkish Instruments and Voices uses an actual Turkish ensemble mixed with Western instruments.

His musical palette tends toward large-scale works, mainly for orchestra or ensemble; he has also composed several smaller works for either solo instrument (In Memoriam: 8/17/99 for piano) or solo instrument and piano (Lines for clarinet and piano).

Although several of his works display this sudden movement between slow chord movements and the nattering of percussion and / or instruments, such as Flight Box (2001) or Hammer Music (1990), other pieces use a more consistent texture, such as the energetic F E S T for New Music Ensemble and Orchestra (1998) or the subdued Curve (1998).

== Reception ==
His work has been performed by orchestras across the world to wide critical acclaim. A critic for the Los Angeles Times called him

that rare composer, able to sound connected with modern music and yet still seem exotic, Kamran Ince is a force on the cutting edge of contemporary composition, bridging the East and the West.

The New Yorker hailed Ince as having

a confident, individual, arresting voice

and The Washington Post remarked Ince had

extraordinary vision and musical sophistication.

== Awards ==
- 1987 Rome Prize
- 1987 Guggenheim Fellowship
- 1988 Lili Boulanger Prize

== List of works ==
=== Orchestra ===
- Academica (1998)
- Before Infrared (1986)
- Cascade (1993)
- Concerto for Orchestra, Turkish Instruments (ney, kemence, 2 zurnas) and Voices (2002)
- Concerto for Piano and Orchestra (1984)
- Deep Flight (1988)
- Domes (1993), Domes (2019: version for woodwind orchestra, commssioned by Shea Lolin and the Bloomsbury Woodwind Ensemble and performed at St John's, Waterloo on 23 November 2019. Recorded with Czech Philharmonic Wind Ensemble in 2023.
- Ebullient Shadows (1987)
- F E S T for New Music Ensemble and Orchestra (1998)
- Hot, Red, Cold, Vibrant (1992)
- Infrared Only (1985)
- Lipstick (1991)
- Plexus (1993)
- Remembering Lycia (1996)
- Symphony No. 1 Castles in the Air (1989)
- Symphony No. 2 Fall of Constantinople (1994)
- Symphony No. 3 Siege of Vienna (1995)
- Symphony No. 4 Sardis (2000)
- Symphony No. 5 Galatasaray (2005)
- Viper's Dance derived from Symphony No. 1, 1989 revised in 1993

=== Large ensemble ===
- Aphrodisiac (1997)
- Arches (1994)
- Evil Eye Deflector (1996)
- Flight Box (2001)
- Hammer Music (1990)
- In White, Violin Concerto (1999)
- Istathenople (2003)
- Love under Siege(1997)
- Night Passage (1992)
- One Last Dance (1991)
- Requiem Without Words (2004)
- Sonnet #395 (1991)
- Split (1998)
- Strange Stone (2004)
- Turquoise (1996)
- Turquoise/Strange Stone (2005)
- Waves of Talya (1989)

=== Small ensemble (chamber music) ===
- Curve (1996)
- Drawings (2001)
- Fantasie of a Sudden Turtle (1990)
- Kaç ("Escape") (1983)
- Köcekce (1984) (After a Black Sea folk dance)
- Lines (1997)
- Matinees (1989)
- MKG MGK Variations for cello solo (1998); also version for guitar
- Tracing (1994)
- Road to Memphis for viola and harpsichord (2008)

=== Piano ===
- The Blue Journey (1982)
- Cross Scintillations (1986)
- In Memoriam: 8/17/99 (1999)
- Gates (2002)
- Kevin's Dream (1994)
- My Friend Mozart (1987)
- Sheherazade Alive (2003)
- An Unavoidable Obsession (1988)
- Symphony in Blue (2012)
