= BORAX experiments =

Series of boiling water nuclear reactor safety experiments

Coordinates: 43.51798°N 113.00946°W

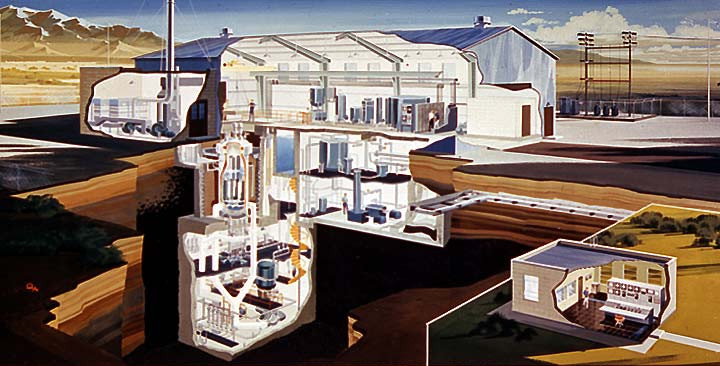
A cutaway view of the BORAX-V facility.

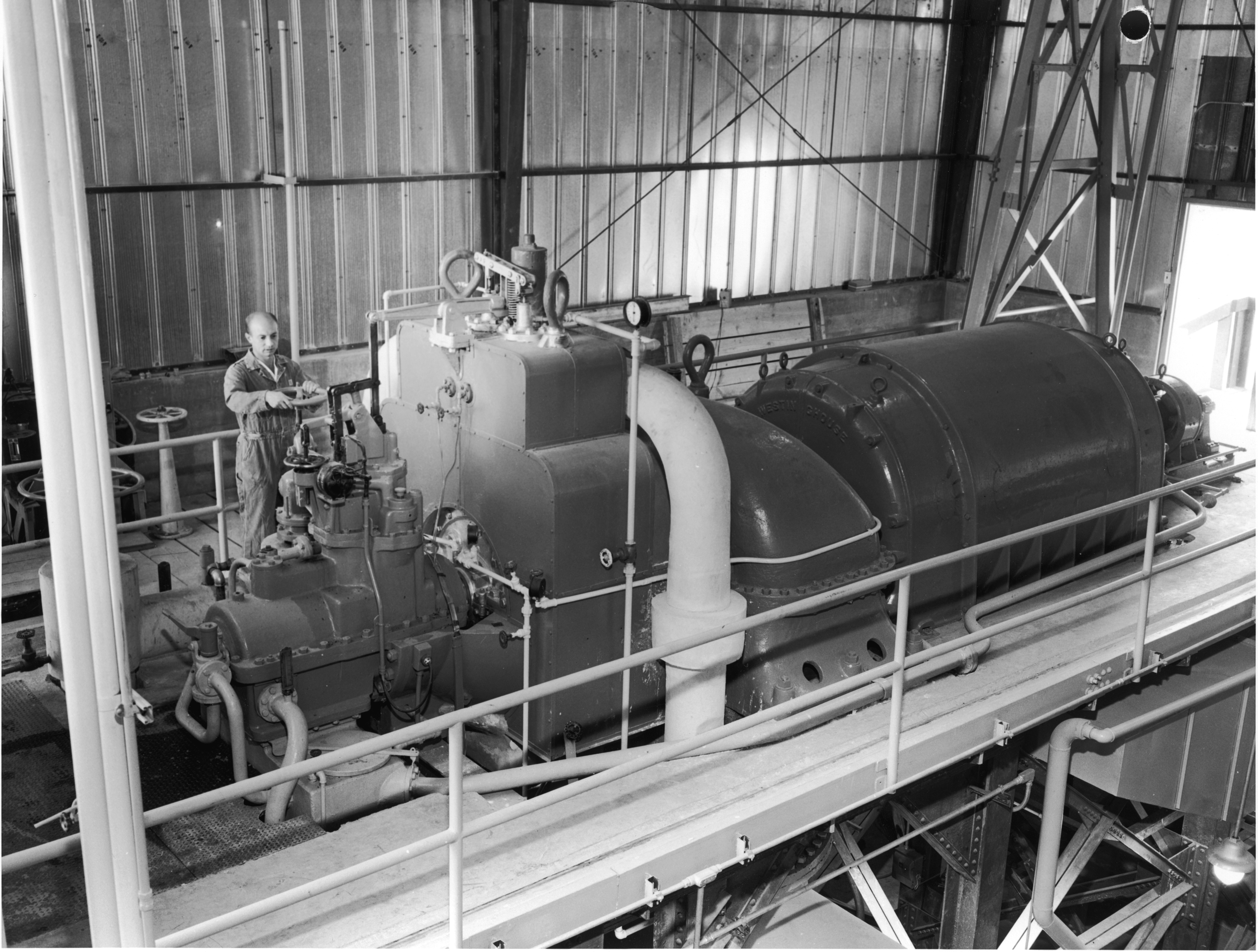
BORAX III steam turbine and generator.

The BORAX Experiments were a series of safety experiments on boiling water nuclear reactors conducted by Argonne National Laboratory in the 1950s and 1960s at the National Reactor Testing Station in eastern Idaho. They were performed using the five BORAX reactors that were designed and built by Argonne. BORAX-III was the first nuclear reactor to supply electrical power to the grid in the United States in 1955.

== Evolution of BORAX ==
This series of tests began in 1952 with the construction of the BORAX-I nuclear reactor. (Note: BORAX was a contraction of the words “boiling water reactor experiment".) The BORAX-I experiment proved that a reactor using direct boiling of water in the core could be stable, because the bubble formation creates a negative void coefficient. Subsequently, the reactor was used for power excursion tests which showed that rapid conversion of water to steam would safely control the reaction. The final, deliberately destructive test in 1954 produced an unexpectedly large power excursion that "instead of the melting of a few fuel plates, the test melted a major fraction of the entire core." Data from this core meltdown and release of nuclear fuel and nuclear fission products helped improve mathematical models. The tests proved key safety principles of the design of modern nuclear power reactors. Design power of BORAX-I was 1.4 megawatts thermal. The BORAX-I design was a precursor to the SL-1 plant, which began operations nearby in 1958. The principles discovered in the BORAX-I experiments helped scientists understand the fatal meltdown at SL-1 in 1961.

The BORAX-II reactor was built in 1954, with a design output of 6 MW(t). In March 1955, BORAX-II was intentionally destroyed by taking the reactor "prompt critical".

BORAX-III added a turbine to the BORAX-II design, proving that turbine contamination would not be a problem. It was linked to the local power grid for about an hour on July 17, 1955. BORAX-III provided 2,000 kW to power nearby Arco, Idaho (500 kW), the BORAX test facility (500 kW), and partially powered the National Reactor Testing Station (after 2004, the Idaho National Laboratory) (1,000 kW). Thus, Arco became the first community solely powered by nuclear energy. The reactor continued to be used for tests until 1956.

BORAX-IV, built in 1956, explored the thorium fuel cycle and uranium-233 fuel with a power of 20 MW thermal. This experiment used fuel plates that were purposely full of defects to explore long-term plant operation with damaged fuel plates. Radioactive gases were released into the atmosphere.

BORAX-V continued the work on boiling water reactor designs, including the use of a superheater. It operated from 1962 to 1964.

== BORAX-I destructive test and cleanup ==
Test synopsis:

The (test was) carried out by withdrawing four of the five control rods far enough to make the reactor critical at a very low power level. The fifth rod was then fired from the core by means of a spring. In this test, the rod was ejected in approximately 0.2 seconds. After the control rod was ejected, an explosion took place in the reactor which carried away the control mechanism and blew out the core. At half a mile, the radiation level rose to 25 mr/hr. Personnel were evacuated for about 30 minutes.

The destruction of BORAX-I caused the "aerial distribution of contaminants resulting from the final experiment of the BORAX-I reactor" and the likely contamination of the topmost 1 foot of soil over about 2 acres in the vicinity. The site required cleanup before it could be used for subsequent experiments. The 84,000-square foot (7,800 m^{2}) area was covered with 6 inches of gravel in 1954, but grass, sagebrush, and other plants reseeded the area since then. Debris from BORAX-I is buried about 2,730 feet (830 m) northwest of the Experimental Breeder Reactor-1, a publicly accessible national monument. Since 1987, the United States Environmental Protection Agency has classified the burial ground as Superfund site Operable Unit 6-01, one of two such sites (along with SL-1) at the Idaho National Laboratory. In 1995, the EPA ordered the primary remedy of the burial ground to be: "Containment by capping with an engineered barrier constructed primarily of native materials." The site is expected to produce no more than a 2 in 10,000 increase in cancer risk for long-term residential use after 320 years, with no significant increase after that time. This risk calculation ignores the shielding provided by the soil cover, which at the time of the EPA decision had reduced exposure to little more than background level, and makes very pessimistic modeling assumptions that greatly increase the projected risk, to deliberately focus on the high rather than low effect side.

== See also ==
- SL-1, the only demonstration of the BORAX-I principles during a real nuclear accident
- Experimental Breeder Reactor I first production of electric power
