= Neil Winokur =

American artist

- Born: 1945 (age 80–81); New York City, U.S.
- Education: Hunter College, 1967, degree in math and physics
- Known for: Photographer

Neil Winokur (born 1945) is an American photographer based in New York City. Winokur's work is in the collections of the Metropolitan Museum of Art, the Museum of Modern Art, and the Los Angeles County Museum of Art.

== Biography ==
Born and raised in New York City, Winokur attended Hunter College, graduating with a degree in math and physics in 1967. Winokur currently works in management at the Strand Bookstore, where he has worked on and off for four-plus decades as a book purchaser.

== Artistic practice ==
In the early 1970s, Winokur began taking photos after borrowing a camera from a friend, initial experimenting in black and white urban scenes. In 1987, Winokur received a Guggenheim Fellowship in the Creative Arts for his photography.

== Exhibitions ==
- 1989 - The Photography of Invention: American Pictures - National Museum of American Art
- 1991 – Pleasures and Terrors of Domestic Comfort - MoMA

== Public collections ==
- Museum of Modern Art
- Metropolitan Museum of Art
- Los Angeles County Museum of Art
