= Marc Mangel =

American mathematical biologist

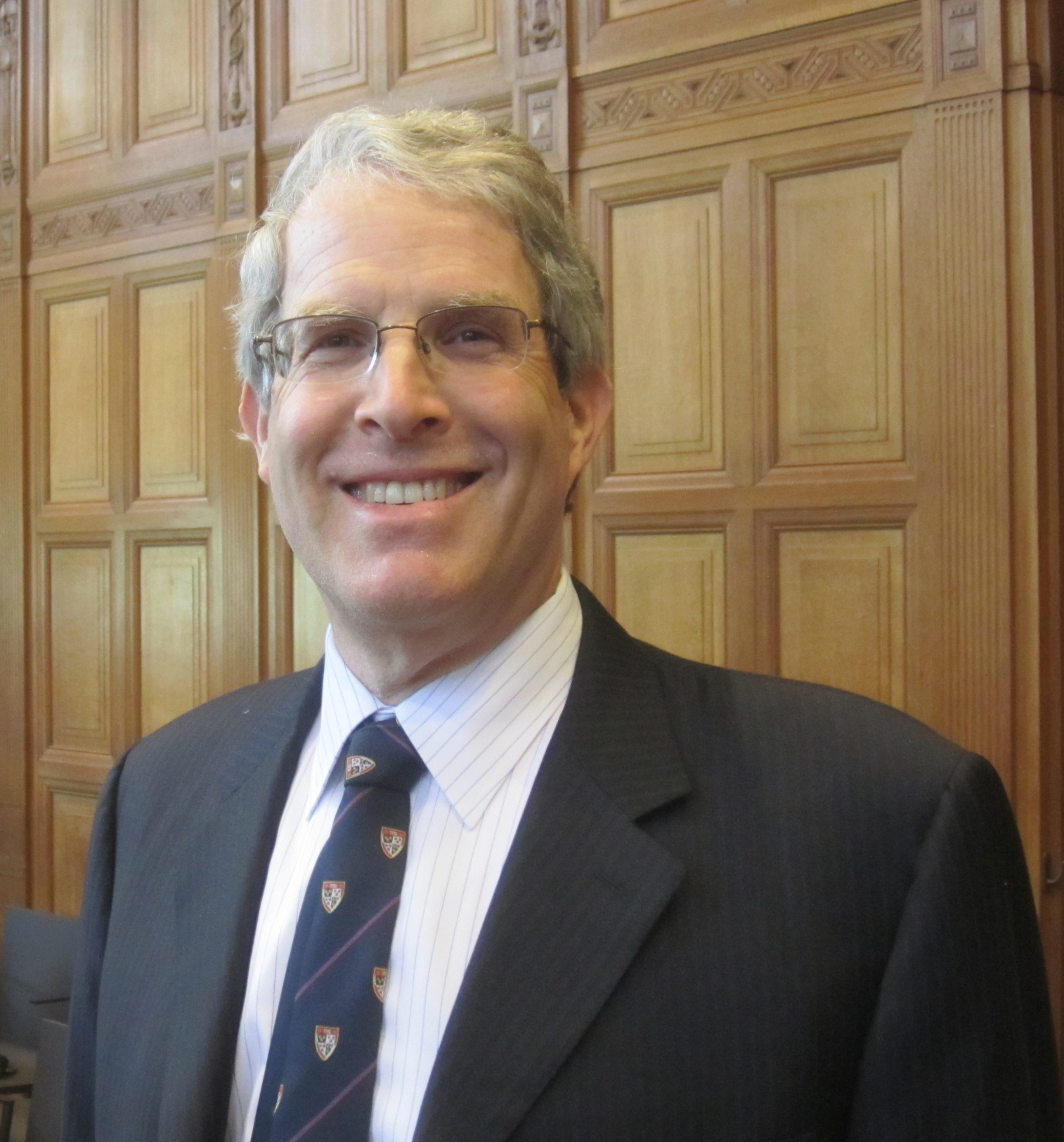
- Mangel testifying before the International Court of Justice in the Whaling case, 2013.
- Born: New York City, United States
- Education: University of Illinois (B.S., M.S.); University of British Columbia (Ph.D.)
- Known for: Theoretical ecology, dynamic state variable modeling, interdisciplinary research in biology and environment
- Awards: Guggenheim Fellowship (1987); Fulbright Fellow (1988); Fellow, American Association for the Advancement of Science (2002); Fellow of the Royal Society of Edinburgh (2009); Fellow of the American Academy of Arts and Sciences (2018)
- Scientific career
- Fields: Mathematical biology, Theoretical ecology, Applied mathematics
- Workplaces: University of California, Santa Cruz (Distinguished Professor Emeritus); University of Bergen (Professor Emeritus)
- Doctoral advisor: Donald Ludwig

Marc Mangel is an American mathematical biologist and professor emeritus known for his contributions to theoretical ecology, applied mathematics, and interdisciplinary environmental research. He is currently Distinguished Professor of Mathematical Biology Emeritus at the University of California, Santa Cruz, and professor emeritus in the Theoretical Ecology Group at the University of Bergen.

== Early life and education ==
Mangel was born in New York City and grew up in the Chicago, IL region graduating from Highland Park High School. Mangel earned his B.S. in physics with high honors from the University of Illinois in 1971. He completed an M.S. in Biophysics in 1972 at the same institution, and received a Ph.D. in Applied Mathematics and Statistics from the University of British Columbia in 1978. where he was supervised by Donald Ludwig and worked as a research assistant for Colin W. Clark. His PhD thesis concerned methods for computing the probability of the outcome of competition between two species of flour beetles. With Clark, he developed models of the tuna-purse seine fishery.

== Career ==
From 1977 to 1980, Mangel worked as a scientific analyst at the Center for Naval Analyses (CNA), a federally funded research and development center supporting the United States Navy. As a CNA employee, he served as the representative of the Operations Evaluation Group at Naval Air Station Whidbey Island, working mainly on aspects of electronic warfare and search problems.

In 1980, Mangel joined the faculty at the University of California, Davis, where he held positions in the Department of Mathematics (1980–88) and the Department of Zoology, which later became the Department of Evolution and Ecology (1988–1996). During his tenure, he co-founded the university's Graduate Programs in Applied mathematics and in Population biology. He served as Chair of the Department of Mathematics from 1984 to 1989 and as founding Director of the Center for Population Biology from 1989 to 1993.

In 1996, Mangel moved to the University of California, Santa Cruz (UCSC), where he held appointments in both Environmental studies (1996–2002) and the Department of Applied mathematics and statistics (2002–2013). His administrative roles at UCSC included serving as Associate Vice Chancellor for Planning and Programs (1997–1999), Chair of the Department of Applied Mathematics and Statistics (2007–2009), and Chair of the Program in Technology and Information Management (2010–2012). Mangel was on the founding board of directors of FishWise, and chaired the board from 2013 to 2020. He retired in July 2013 and returned one month later with the title of Distinguished Research Professor, which he held until July 2025. In 2014, Mangel appeared as the Independent Expert for Australia in the case in the International Court of Justice Whaling in the Antarctic: Australia v. Japan, in which the Court concluded that the Japanese Special Permit Whaling Program contravened the International Convention for the Regulation of Whaling.

Mangel has worked with colleagues in the Theoretical Ecology Group at the University of Bergen (UiB) since 1994 and was appointed adjunct professor in 2010, moving to professor emeritus of Biology in 2021 on his retirement from UiB.

== Research ==
Mangel's research focuses on the use of mathematical and theoretical approaches in ecology, evolutionary biology, and conservation biology. He has contributed to areas such as behavioral ecology, host–parasitoid interactions, sustainable fisheries management, and conservation biology. He is known for linking theoretical models with empirical data to address practical challenges.

Mangel’s early research in mathematical biology involved the development of new methods for computing the probability of the outcome in stochastic competition between two computing species, motivated by Park’s classic study of competition between species of flour beetle. During his research with Colin W. Clark on tuna fisheries, Mangel developed an interest in the search for schools of fish by fishing vessels.

After moving to CNA, he developed methods for determining the distribution of location and probability of success in search for a moving object, thus extending the work of Bernard Koopman on Bayesian search theory.

With his move to UC Davis, Mangel’s interest in search problems immediately translated to search problems in agricultural pest control (especially trapping and detection), fisheries, and behavioral ecology. He spent the vast majority of his career working on problems from those fields, with a focus in Pasteur's quadrant.

== Selected honors and recognition ==
- E.J. James Scholar, University of Illinois (1968–1971)
- Phi Beta Kappa (1971)
- Koopman Paper Prize, Operations Research Society of America (1981)
- Guggenheim Fellow, John Simon Guggenheim Memorial Foundation (1987)
- Fulbright Senior Research Fellow (1988)
- George Gund Foundation Distinguished Environmental Scholar, Case Western Reserve University (1992)
- Distinguished Statistical Ecologist, International Association for Ecology (1998)
- William R. and Lenore Mote Eminent Scholar in Marine Biology, Florida State University (2000–2001, 2020–2021)
- Fellow, California Academy of Sciences (2000)
- Fellow, American Association for the Advancement of Science (2002)
- Excellence in Teaching Award, UCSC Academic Senate (2003)
- Astor Lecturer, University of Oxford (2007)
- Fellow, American Institute of Fishery Research Biologists (2007)
- Fellow, Royal Society of Edinburgh (2009)
- Kendall Paper Prize, American Fisheries Society (2010)
- Queen’s Anniversary Prize with colleagues at the Sea Mammal Research Unit, University of St. Andrews (2011)
- Honorary Doctor of Science, University of Guelph (2014)
- Secretary of Commerce Group Gold Medal, U.S. Department of Commerce (2015)
- Fellow, Ecological Society of America (2016)
- Member, American Academy of Arts and Sciences (2018)
- Outstanding Achievement Award, American Institute of Fishery Research Biologists (2019)
- Fellow, Society for Industrial and Applied Mathematics (2013)
- Fellow, Society for Mathematical Biology (2024)

== Selected works ==
=== Books ===
- Decision and Control in Uncertain Resource Systems, Academic Press, 1985
- Dynamic Modeling in Behavioral Ecology, Princeton University Press, 1988; Russian edition: Dinamicheskie modeli v ekologii povedeniya, Mir Publishers, 1992
- The Ecological Detective: Confronting Models with Data, Princeton University Press, 1997
- Dynamic State Variable Models in Ecology: Methods and Applications, Oxford University Press, 2000
- The Theoretical Biologist's Toolbox, Cambridge University Press, 2006
- Fighting the Virus: How Disease Modeling Can Enhance Cyber Security, World Scientific, 2024

=== Edited volumes ===
- Resource Management, Springer-Verlag, 1985
- Pest Control: Operations and Systems Analysis in Fruit Fly Management, Springer-Verlag, 1986
- Sex Allocation and Sex Change: Experiments and Models, American Mathematical Society, 1990
