= Yoshiko Chuma =

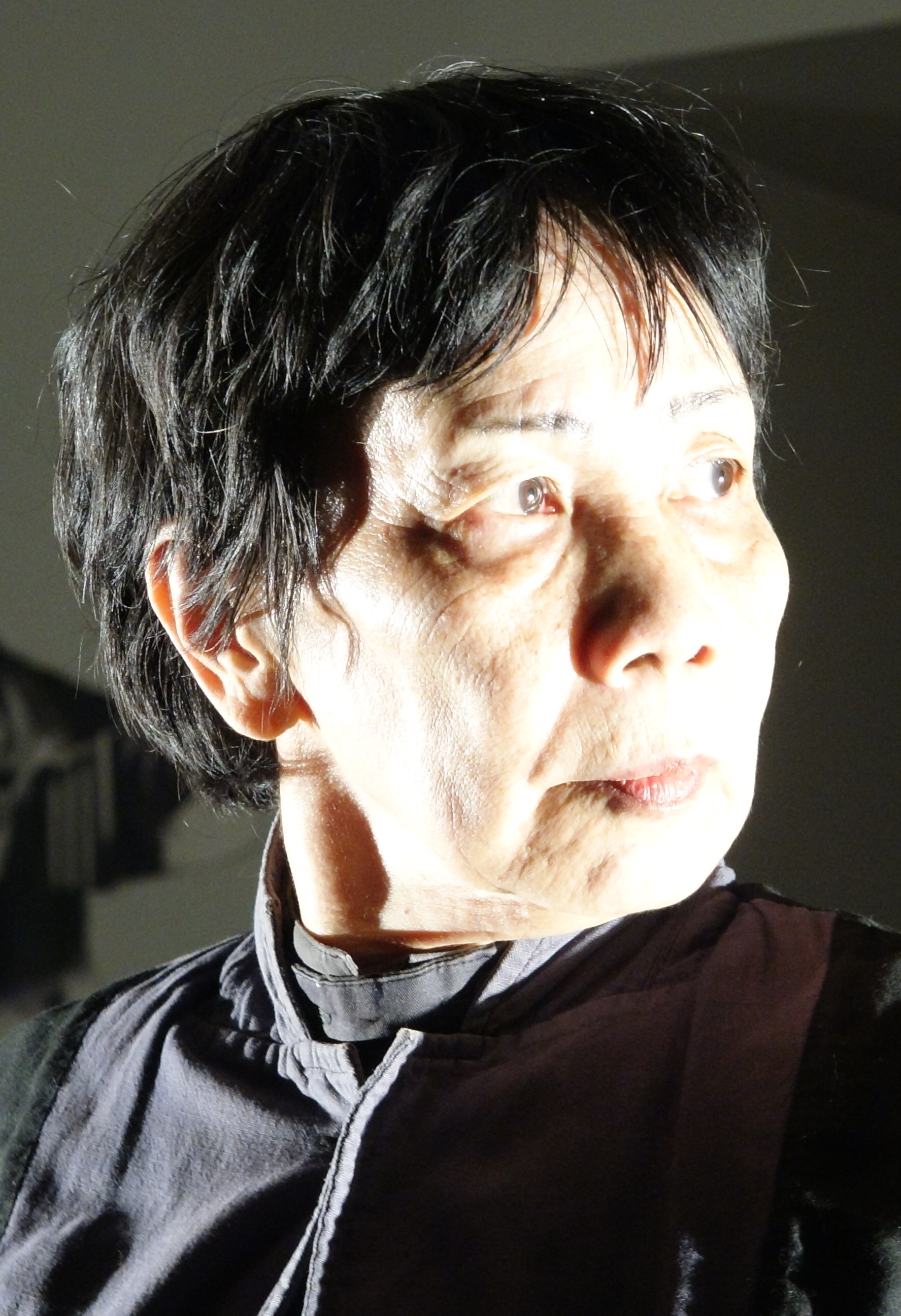
Yoshiko Chuma performing at La MaMa Experimental Theatre Club in NYC in 2025

Yoshiko Chuma (中馬 芳子, Chūma Yoshiko; born in Osaka, Japan) is a dancer, a choreographer and the director of the Bessie Award winning performance art group The School of Hard Knocks. Described in 2007 by Bloomberg as "a fixture on New York's downtown scene for over a quarter-century", her work spans from early "absurdist gaiety" to more recent serious reflection, which nevertheless represents the "maverick imagination and crazy-quilt multimedia work" for which the artist is known. Dance commentators have found her work difficult to classify; in a 2006 profile, Dance Magazine speculated that "One might call her a postmodern choreographer, a movement designer, or a visual artist whose primary medium is human beings--dancers, musicians, pedestrians". Chuma favors abstract art and discourages efforts to interpret her work, telling Bloomberg that "What I do is ambiguous. I don't have a statement. If I had a statement, I'd be a writer". In 2007, Chuma received a Bessie Award honoring her sustained achievements as a choreographer.

== Biography ==
Chuma arrived in the United States from her native Japan in 1977, settling in Manhattan and subsequently becoming a leader in modern American dance. In 2007, The New York Times remarked on her involvement "in one of the great populist moments in New York dance" when, in 1988, she staged an audience-participatory performance art swim-dance in the Astoria pools in Queens. Her avant-garde pieces have included the seven-hour-long "Sundown", an exploration of cubism mounted at Issue Project Space in 2006.

In addition to directing The School of Hard Knocks, Chuma also directed the Daghdha Dance Company of Ireland, commuting internationally between 2000 and 2004.

== Influences ==
Chuma cites American television as a major part of her childhood, and critics have detected influence in her "raucous dance/music/theater spectacles on American pop themes". She has also been inspired by Japanese cinema. Specific art influences include the school of minimalism and the opera Einstein on the Beach. After meeting notable beat poet Allen Ginsberg, she incorporated into her dances his philosophy on spontaneity, encapsulated in his phrase "First thought, best thought." Chuma also credits artist Alex Katz and composer Alvin Curran as among her diverse inspirations.

== The School of Hard Knocks ==
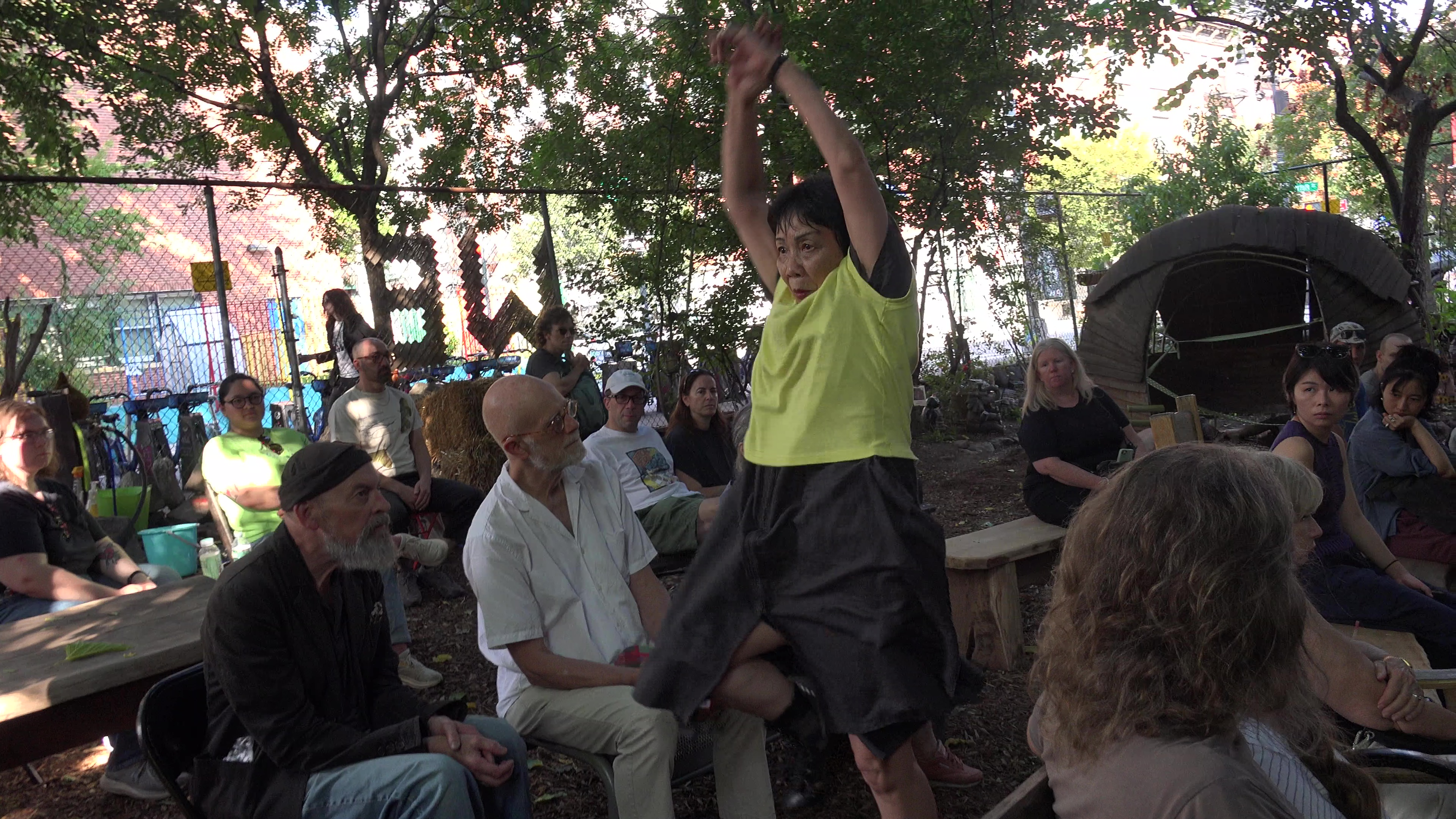
video still from Yoshiko Chuma's performance at Children's Magical Garden in NYC in 2025

The School of Hard Knocks, more fully titled "Yoshiko Chuma & The School of Hard Knocks," was founded in 1982 and is located in New York City. The name was inspired by Chuma's interest in American idioms during her early days in the United States. In 1984, the group received a Bessie Award for its Collective Work.

== Further reading and listening ==
- Anderson, Jack (January 27, 1987). "DANCE: 'BIG PICTURE,' BY YOSHKO CHUMA". The New York Times.
- Daghdha Dance Company review (2001), Dance Magazine
- Yellow Room (2003), Irish Times
- Sundown (2006) review, Village Voice
- A Page Out of Order: M (2007) review, The New York Times.
- "X2 (2009) review". The New York Times.
- X2 (2009) review Village Voice
- POOM2 (2008) review, The New York Times
- "Review: Yoshiko Chuma and the School of Hard Knocks, Harkness Dance Festival"The New York Times.
- (recorded interview with Yoshiko Chuma), Kadmus Arts
- A-C-E One (2010) review The New York Times
- Hold the Clock (2010) review Japan Times
