= Diane Orr =

American filmmaker and television executive (born 1944)

- Born: May 1, 1944 (age 82); Ogden, Utah, U.S.
- Education: Stanford University (BA)
- Occupations: Filmmaker; news executive
- Children: 2
- Father: George C. Hatch
- Awards: Alfred I. duPont–Columbia University Award (1972); Guggenheim Fellowship (1987)

Diane Glasmann Orr (born May 1, 1944) is an American documentary filmmaker and television executive. She worked at Salt Lake City television station KUTV in several capacities, including as executive producer for the Extra newsmagazine and as news director (1990–1995). After winning awards for her work at KUTV, she won a 1987 Guggenheim Fellowship to work with C. Larry Roberts on a documentary on Everett Ruess.

== Biography ==
Orr was born on May 1, 1944, in Ogden, Utah. Her parents George C. Hatch and Gene Glasmann Hatch were mass media executives, with her father owning KUTV and her mother serving as president of The Standard Corp. from 1955 until 1993. After a year at the Free University of Berlin, Orr obtained a BA from Stanford University in 1966, before spending another year at San Francisco State University.

In 1969, she joined KUTV as a producer and director. She later served as executive producer at KUTV's Extra newsmagazine. She served as news director of KUTV from 1990 until 1995; after an 88-percent stake in KUTV was sold to out-of-state interests, she was replaced by Con Psarras. Orr was also assistant treasurer of KUTV's majority owner, The Standard Corp.

She produced the KUTV special Warriors Without A Weapon, winning a 1972 Alfred I. duPont–Columbia University Award. She also won a San Francisco International Film Festival Broadcast Media Award for another KUTV documentary, The Longest War (1973). In 1979, she became co-producer and director for Beecher Films. By 1990, she had produced dozens of documentaries and videos.

Orr collaborated with fellow Extra producer C. Larry Roberts on documentaries such as SL-1 (which aired on WNET) and The Plan (1979). In 1987, the duo were awarded a Guggenheim Fellowship for a documentary on Everett Ruess. The project briefly went on hiatus after Roberts died in 1988, but was later revived, and Lost Forever: Everett Ruess was screened in 2001. Terry Orme said that the Orr-Roberts duo "epitomize[d] the regional, independent filmmaker".

Orr was awarded a 1994 Leading Change Award by the Utah Professional Chapter of Women in Communications. She once served as a board member for the Sundance Institute. Her films are archived at the J. Willard Marriott Library.

Orr had two children.
