= C. Larry Roberts =

American filmmaker (1944-1988)

- Born: August 2, 1944; WaKeeney, Kansas, U.S.
- Died: June 26, 1988 (aged 43); Salt Lake City, Utah, U.S.
- Education: Fort Hays State University (BA); University of Denver (MA)
- Occupation: Filmmaker
- Awards: Guggenheim Fellowship (1987)

C. Larry Roberts (August 2, 1944 – June 26, 1988) was an American filmmaker. He made a few dozen films, including The Smara (1973), Calamus (1978), and Strong Willed Women Subdue and Subjugate Reptiles (1982). He also won a 1987 Guggenheim Fellowship to work with Diane Orr on a documentary on Everett Ruess, posthumously completed a decade later.

== Biography ==
C. Larry Roberts was born on August 2, 1944, in WaKeeney, Kansas. He had a brother. He obtained a BS at Fort Hays State University in 1966 and an MA from the University of Denver in 1969.

Originally an art teacher, Roberts became interested in film after seeing the work of such creators as Stan Brakhage and Bruce Conner. In 1973, he released The Smara, centering on a middle-aged woman waking up to find herself in a homage to 8½; the film won a 1973 Bijou Film Festival award. Other films he made include Calamus (1978), an "inverted Gothic with comedy", involving "outrageous parodies of social norms"; Strong Willed Women Subdue and Subjugate Reptiles (1982), a found footage short film which won a 1983 Ann Arbor Film Festival prize; and I Was a Teenage Travelogue, where he is briefly seen meeting Luis Buñuel; as well as Muskrats. In total, he created thirty films, mostly experimental film, and the time of his death he was working on another film, The Divine Abyss.

Roberts joined KUTV as a producer and director in 1976, and he worked at the station's newsmagazine Extra as a producer. He also became a co-producer and director at Beecher Films in 1979. He worked as a visiting filmmaker at San Francisco State University (1984) and University of California, Santa Cruz (1984, 1986), and held an artist-in-residence position at the Utah Media Arts Center.

Roberts collaborated with fellow Extra producer Diane Orr on documentaries such as SL-1 (which aired on WNET) and The Plan (1979). In 1987, the duo were awarded a Guggenheim Fellowship for a documentary on Everett Ruess. Terry Orme said that the Orr-Roberts duo "epitomize[d] the regional, independent filmmaker"; however, Calvin Ahlgren said that "it was Roberts' solo work that earned him a reputation as a filmmaker with not only a flair for craftsmanship but also a characteristic enthusiasm and imagination, laced with a quirky sense of humor that lights his films from within".

Roberts died on June 26, 1988, in Salt Lake City from AIDS. The Everett Ruess project subsequently went on hiatus, but was later revived, and Lost Forever: Everett Ruess was screened in 2001. His films are archived at the J. Willard Marriott Library.
