= Crisis (disambiguation) =

A crisis is a traumatic or stressful change for a person, or an unstable and dangerous situation for a society.

Crisis may also refer to:

== Arts, entertainment, and media ==
=== Comics ===
- Crisis (Fleetway), a British comic
- Crisis on Infinite Earths, by DC Comics, often called in-universe as just "The Crisis"

=== Films ===
- Crisis (1939 film), a documentary about the 1938 Sudeten Crisis
- Crisis (1946 film), a film directed by Ingmar Bergman
- Crisis (1950 film), a film directed by Richard Brooks
- Crisis (1972 film), a film directed by Robert Bruning
- Crisis: Behind a Presidential Commitment, a 1963 documentary directed by Robert Drew
- Crisis (2021 film), a film directed by Nicholas Jarecki

=== Music ===
==== Groups and labels ====
- Crisis (metal band), American avant-garde metal band
- Crisis (punk band), British punk band

==== Albums ====
- Crisis (Alexisonfire album), a 2006 album by Alexisonfire
- Crisis (Ornette Coleman album), a 1969 album by Ornette Coleman
- Crisis? What Crisis?, a 1975 album by Supertramp

==== Songs ====
- "Crisis", a 1961 song by Freddie Hubbard from Mosaic (Art Blakey album) and from Ready for Freddie
- "Crisis", a 1978 song by Bob Marley & The Wailers from the album Kaya
- "Crisis", a 1992 song by Fear Factory from Soul of a New Machine
- "Crisis", a 2016 song by Anohni from Hopelessness (album)
- "Crisis", a 2020 song by In Hearts Wake from Kaliyuga

=== Periodicals ===
- Crisis Magazine, a publication of Sophia Institute Press
- The Crisis (newspaper), a newspaper published during the first half of the American Civil War by Samuel Medary
- The Crisis, the official magazine of the NAACP

=== Television ===
- "Crisis" (M*A*S*H), a 1974 episode of the CBS television series
- Crisis (TV series), 2014 television series produced for NBC
- Crisis, the alternate title for Kraft Suspense Theatre in syndicated reruns
- "Crisis", episode 3 of the 1964 Doctor Who serial Planet of Giants; may also refer to the original recorded version that never aired

=== Literature ===
- Crisis (Boye novel), a 1934 autobiographical novel by Karin Boye
- Crisis (Cook novel), a 2006 novel in the Jack Stapleton and Laurie Montgomery series by Robin Cook
- Crisis (Majfud novel), a 2012 novel by Jorge Majfud

=== Games ===
- Crisis (game), a play-by-mail wargame

== Economics ==
- Crisis theory, a theory generally associated with Marxian economics
- Financial crisis, a variety of situations in which some financial institutions or assets suddenly lose a large part of their value

== Psychology ==
- Existential crisis, when a person doubts if his or her existence has a purpose
- Identity crisis (psychology)
- Midlife crisis, several issues that confront some people aged from 40 to 55
  - Quarter-life crisis, a recently coined similar term for 20- to 30-year-olds
- Suicidal crisis

== Other uses ==
- Crisis (charity) (formerly Crisis at Christmas), a British charity
- Crisis (dynamical systems), the sudden appearance or disappearance of a strange attractor as the parameters of a dynamical system are varied
- Chinese translation of crisis, popular misconception that "crisis" is translated "danger"+"opportunity"

== See also ==
- climax (disambiguation)
- Critical (disambiguation)
- Crysis, a video game series
- Khrysis, American music producer
- Emergency
- The Crisis (disambiguation)
- Crises (disambiguation)
