= Criticality =

Criticality may refer to:

== Physics terms ==
- Critical phenomena, the collective name associated with the physics of critical points
  - Critical point (thermodynamics), the end point of a phase equilibrium curve
  - Quantum critical point, a special class of continuous phase transition that takes place at absolute zero

=== Nuclear-physics terms ===
- Criticality (status), the state in which a nuclear chain reaction is self-sustaining
  - Prompt criticality, the criticality that is achieved with prompt neutrons alone
  - Critical mass, the minimum mass of the nuclear reactor's fissionable material that can achieve criticality
- Criticality accident, an uncontrolled nuclear chain reaction
- Nuclear criticality safety, the prevention of nuclear and radiation accidents resulting from an inadvertent, self-sustaining nuclear chain reaction

== Other terms ==
- Critical thinking, in education
- Criticality index, in risk analysis
- Criticality matrix, a representation (often graphical) of failure modes along with their probabilities and severities
- Self-organized criticality, a property of (classes of) dynamical systems which have a critical point as an attractor
- Critical point
