= The Crisis (disambiguation) =

The Crisis is the official magazine of the National Association for the Advancement of Colored People.

The Crisis may also refer to:

- The Crisis (newspaper), a newspaper published during the first half of the American Civil War by Samuel Medary
- The Crisis (novel), a 1901 novel by the American novelist Winston Churchill
- The Crisis (1916 film), a 1916 silent film historical drama
- The Crisis (1913 film), an Australian melodrama film directed by W.J. Lincoln
- The Crisis, a colloquial term for the Bougainville Civil War
- The Crisis, a periodical published 1832-1834 by Robert Owen, and part of the early socialist and labour movements
- The Crisis of European Sciences and Transcendental Phenomenology, a 1936 book by Edmund Husserl

== See also ==
- The American Crisis, a pamphlet series by 18th-century Enlightenment philosopher and author Thomas Paine
- Crisis (disambiguation)
