= Chrysus (disambiguation) =

Chrysus is the daimon of gold in Greek mythology.

Chrysus may also refer to:

- Körös, a river in Hungary and Romania known as Chrysus in antiquity
- Dobromir Chrysus or Dobromir Chrysos (13th century), leader of the Vlachs and Bulgarian Slavs

== See also ==
- Halichoeres chrysus, a fish native to central Indo-Pacific area
- Sarota chrysus, a butterfly of the Amazon River basin and the Andes
- Chrysis (disambiguation)
- Chryses (mythology)
