= Critical =

Critical or Critically may refer to:

- Critical thinking, analysis of facts to form a judgment
- Critical, or critical but stable, medical states
  - Critical, or intensive care medicine
- Critical juncture, a discontinuous change studied in the social sciences.
- Critical Software, a company specializing in mission and business critical information systems
- Critical theory, a school of thought that critiques society and culture by applying knowledge from the social sciences and the humanities
- Critically endangered, a risk status for wild species
- Criticality (status), the condition of sustaining a nuclear chain reaction

== Art, entertainment, and media ==
- Critical (novel), a medical thriller written by Robin Cook
- Critical (TV series), a Sky 1 TV series
- "Critical" (Person of Interest), an episode of the American television drama series Person of Interest
- "Critical", a song by Abhi the Nomad from the album Abhi vs the Universe, 2021
- "Critical", a 1999 single by Zion I from the album Mind over Matter

== People ==
- MoistCr1tikal (born 1994), an American YouTuber and Twitch streamer

== See also ==
- Critic
- Criticality (disambiguation)
- Critical Condition (disambiguation)
- Criticism
- Crisis
- Critique
