= Chrysis =

Chrysis may refer to:

- Chrysis (wasp), a genus of cuckoo wasps in the family Chrysididae
- An ancient Greek personal name (as a female name: Χρυσίς, as a male name: Χρῦσις); in particular:
  - Chrysis (priestess), priestess who caused the destruction of the Heraion of Argos in 423 BC
  - Chrysis, the eponymous girl from Samos in the play Samia by Menander
  - Chrysis, the eponymous girl from Andros in the play Andria by Terence
  - Chrysis, the courtesan in the novel Aphrodite: mœurs antiques by Pierre Louÿs
  - Chrysis, a mistress of Demetrius I of Macedon according to Plutarch's Lives

== See also ==
- Chrysis Painter, a 5th-century BC Attic vase painter
- Crysis, a video game
- Crisis (disambiguation)
