= Hugh C. Paxton =

American nuclear physicist (1909–2003)

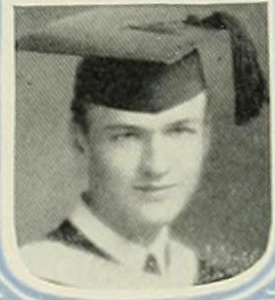
- Paxton in the 1930 UCLA yearbook
- Born: April 29, 1909; Los Angeles, California, U.S.
- Died: December 25, 2003 (aged 94); Albuquerque, New Mexico, U.S.
- Education: UCLA (AB); UC Berkeley (PhD)
- Known for: Experimental criticality, Pajarito Site, Nuclear criticality safety, Phosphorus-32 spectrum, Lady Godiva assembly
- Spouse: Jean Nellis Thomson (m. 1937)
- Children: 2
- Scientific career
- Fields: Nuclear physics, Criticality safety, Spectroscopy
- Workplaces: Los Alamos National Laboratory, Columbia University, Bell Labs
- Thesis: The beta-ray spectrum of P^{32} (1937)
- Doctoral advisor: Ernest Lawrence

Hugh Campbell Paxton (April 29, 1909 – December 25, 2003) was an American nuclear physicist and a pioneer in the field of nuclear criticality safety. A doctoral student of Nobel laureate Ernest Lawrence, Paxton's early work on the energy spectra of radioisotopes provided the technical foundation for the early medical applications of the cyclotron. He spent nearly 30 years as the leader of the Critical Assemblies Group at Los Alamos National Laboratory (LANL), where he became a leading authority on fast critical experiments.

== Early life and education ==
Paxton was born in Los Angeles on April 29, 1909, one of the five children of Charles Hugh Paxton (1875–1953), a Stanford University-trained mechanical engineer who later taught mechanic arts at UCLA, and Grace Beatrice Paxton (née Dorn). His younger brother Norman L. Paxton was a naval aviator and recipient of the Navy Cross. He earned an A.B. degree in physics from the University of California, Los Angeles (UCLA) in 1930. At UCLA he served as president of the Associated Engineering Students, was a member of the mathematics honor society Pi Mu Epsilon, and ran track. After working at Bell Telephone Laboratories, he completed his PhD at the University of California, Berkeley in 1937.

His dissertation, The Beta-ray Spectrum of P^{32}, provided the first precise measurements of the energy distribution of electrons emitted by radioactive Phosphorus-32. Shortly after graduation, he married Jean Nellis Thomson.

== Career ==
=== Manhattan Project ===
In 1941, Paxton co-authored the textbook Matter, Energy and Radiation with John R. Dunning. During World War II, he conducted cyclotron research at the Collège de France in Paris until the German occupation. He subsequently supported the Manhattan Project at Columbia University, Oak Ridge, Tennessee, and Philadelphia.

=== Los Alamos National Laboratory ===
Paxton joined the Los Alamos Scientific Laboratory in late 1948, serving as leader of the Critical Assemblies Group at the Pajarito Site (TA-18) until 1975. His work involved the experimental determination of critical mass for nuclear weapons and reactors. He oversaw the operation of the **Topsy**, **Lady Godiva**, and **Jezebel** assemblies.

== Selected publications ==
- Dunning, J. R.; Paxton, H. C. (1941). Matter, Energy and Radiation. McGraw-Hill.
- Paxton, H. C. (1981). "Fast critical experiments". Progress in Nuclear Energy. 7 (3): 151–174. doi:10.1016/0149-1970(81)90030-5.
- Paxton, H. C. (1989). Glossary of Nuclear Criticality Terms (Report). Los Alamos National Laboratory. LA-11627-MS.

== Selected publications ==
- Paxton, Hugh C. (1975). Los Alamos Critical-Mass Data. Los Alamos Scientific Laboratory. LA-3067-MS.
- Pruvost, Norman L.; Paxton, Hugh C. (1996). Nuclear Criticality Safety Guide. Los Alamos National Laboratory. LA-12808.
- Paxton, Hugh C. (1983). "A History of Critical Experiments at Pajarito Site". Los Alamos National Laboratory Report. LA-9685-H.
