= VPB-34 =

Patrol Bombing Squadron 34
- Active: 16 April 1942 – 7 April 1945
- Country: United States of America
- Branch: United States Navy
- Type: squadron
- Role: Maritime patrol
- Engagements: [[World War II Guadalcanal campaign Solomon Islands Campaign Battle of leytegulf]]

Aircraft flown
- Patrol: PBY-5

VPB-34 was a Patrol Bombing Squadron of the U.S. Navy. The squadron was established as Patrol Squadron 34 (VP-34) on 16 April 1942, redesignated Patrol Bombing Squadron 34 (VPB-34) on 1 October 1944 and disestablished on 7 April 1945.

== Operational history ==
- 16 April 1942: VP-34 was established at NAS Norfolk, Virginia, under the operational control of FAW-5, as a seaplane squadron flying the PBY-5 Catalina. A shortage of aircraft prevented the squadron from receiving its full complement of Catalinas until early June 1942. In the interim VP-81 loaned the squadron one PBY-5 with which to practice. Several aircrews were sent to NAS Banana River, Florida and NAS Key West, Florida, for flight instruction with other squadrons.
- 25 July 1942: VP-34 was by this time fully equipped and manned. Orders were received for duty at NAS Coco Solo, Panama Canal Zone, with detachments at Kingston, Jamaica, and Trujillo, Honduras. During this period the squadron conducted Anti-submarine warfare (ASW) training, and provided convoy coverage patrols under the operational control of FAW-3.
- 10 October 1942: The squadron was transferred to NAS Guantanamo Bay, Cuba, under the operational control of FAW-11. Detachments were maintained at Great Exuma Island, NAS San Juan, Antigua, NAS Trinidad, and Essequibo. Coverage for convoys and ASW patrols in the Caribbean were provided around the clock.
- 7 June 1943: VP-34 was relieved of duties in the Caribbean and relocated to NAS San Diego, California, under the operational control of FAW-14. Personnel were given home leave prior to the pending departure to the South Pacific. Upon return from leave, all hands began preparation for the trans-Pacific flight to NAS Kaneohe Bay, Hawaii.
- 8–10 July 1943: VP-34 arrived at NAS Kaneohe Bay, Hawaii, and came under the operational control of FAW-2. Squadron personnel were given a brief period of combat training in the vicinity of the Hawaiian Islands.
- 24 July 1943: The squadron was split into detachments with six aircraft at Midway Island, five at Kanton Island, and one at Johnston Atoll. Search patrols in the vicinity of the islands were conducted during the daylight hours. The squadron detachments returned to NAS Kaneohe Bay on 11 August 1943.
- 18 August 1943: A detachment of six aircraft was sent to Funafuti Island.
- 23 August 1943: A detachment of three aircraft returned to Johnston Atoll, remaining until 12 September 1943, when they returned to NAS Kaneohe Bay. Two days later this same detachment was sent to Kanton Island to conduct daytime long range searches for enemy vessels.
- 21 September 1943: The Kanton and Funafuti detachments were relocated to Perth, Australia, arriving on 29 September 1943. Training and long-range search patrols were conducted by the squadron through mid-December under the operational control of FAW-10.
- 18 December 1943: VP-34 was relocated to Palm Island, Queensland, Australia, under the operational control of FAW-17. By 26 December 1943, the squadron was located at Samarai, Papua New Guinea, where it began its first offensive combat operations against the enemy as a Black Cat squadron.
- 31 December 1943 – 22 January 1944: Lieutenant Commander Thomas A. Christopher, the squadron commanding officer, set the pace for VP-34 operations in the Bismarck Sea area of operations. On 31 December 1944 (sic) he attacked and damaged one enemy vessel during a night patrol. On 22 January 1944 he again attacked and damaged an enemy vessel at night, receiving damage from heavy anti-aircraft (AA) fire resulting in injury to one crewmember. For his leadership in seeking out the enemy and pressing home the attack under heavy fire Lieutenant Commander Christopher was awarded the Navy Cross. On 15 January 1944 Christopher led a five-aircraft attack on a strongly escorted enemy convoy attempting to cross the straits. He made a masthead attack at extremely close range and personally accounted for one 6,800-ton merchantman, while the remainder of the flight destroyed two more. For this action Lieutenant Commander Christopher was awarded a Gold Star in lieu of a second Navy Cross.
- 31 December 1943 – 15 February 1944: Lieutenant Ellis J. Fisher led his crew in numerous attacks on Japanese shipping in the Bismarck Sea. On the nights of 31 December 1943, 4 and 15 January 1944, and 15 February 1944 he participated in attacks on heavily escorted enemy convoys, sinking a large merchant ship, heavily damaging another and aiding in the destruction of a large tanker. On 18 January and 2 February 1944 he damaged a large merchant vessel and sank a medium-sized tanker. On 13 February 1944 he successfully strafed and destroyed an armed enemy vessel, sank five motor launches and probably damaged a midget submarine. For his actions between 31 December 1943 and 15 February 1944 he was awarded the Navy Cross.
- January–February 1944: During the nights of 16 and 22 January and 15 February, Lieutenant Harold L. Dennison led his crew against enemy ships in the Bismarck Sea and within the vicinity of strong enemy bases. He bombed an enemy destroyer under intense AA fire which caused severe damage to his aircraft. However, with his damaged aircraft, he returned to make repeated strafing attacks. Under hazardous weather conditions he carried out an attack against a large merchant vessel in a strongly defended convoy. Receiving heavy and constant enemy fire, he caused heavy damage to the merchant vessel. In another action he forced an enemy tanker to run aground. For his actions in these engagements he was awarded the Navy Cross.
- 12 February 1944: Several VP-34 crews were relocated to Port Moresby, with the remaining crews and ground personnel remaining at Samarai, Papua New Guinea, to conduct maintenance, overhauls and a brief period of relief from combat operations. The detachment sent to Moresby boarded USS Half Moon and USS San Pablo for passage to Langemak Bay. On 19 February 1943, air-sea rescue and evacuation missions were conducted in support of TG 73.1.
- 15 February 1944: Lieutenant (jg) Nathan G. Gordon and his crew of the Samarai detachment were assigned to provide air-sea rescue support to the Army for an air attack on the enemy-held Kavieng Harbor, New Ireland. Lieutenant (jg) Gordon made four full stall landings in the rough waters of the harbor to collect survivors, coming under intense enemy fire. He and his crew located and picked up 15 Army fliers shot down during the attack. After rescuing the last man, Lieutenant (jg) Gordon was running out of fuel and was forced to land at Wewak, New Guinea. There he unloaded the Army fliers on the recently arrived tender San Pablo (AVP 30) before refueling and returning to Samarai. Lieutenant (jg) Gordon was later awarded the Medal of Honor for his conduct, and each member of his crew received the Silver Star. 17 Feb 1944: Lieutenant Orazio Simonelli was awarded the Navy Cross for his action in rescuing five airmen who had been forced down by enemy gunfire on 15 February during the air attack against Kavieng Harbor, New Ireland. Although his PBY Catalina lost its fighter escort before reaching the downed airmen, Lieutenant Simonelli continued on to his object and the successful rescue, which included several severely injured men.
- 17 May 1944: The Langemak Bay detachment was relocated to Hollandia aboard USS Half Moon, where it continued air-sea rescue and evacuation missions through mid-July.
- 18 May 1944: The Samarai detachment was relocated to Manus Island supported by the tender USS Tangier. Daytime scouting missions and long range scouting patrols were conducted through mid-July.
- 16 July 1944: VP-34 was relocated to Mios Woendi and Middleburg Airfield for a continuation of Black Cat operations.
- 31 July 1944: On the night of 31 July 1944 Lieutenant Norman L. Paxton led his crew in an attack against a large enemy freighter-transport protected by two escorts at anchor in a small harbor. He attacked in bright moonlight and against an intense barrage of AA fire. His low altitude attack succeeded in destroying the freighter-transport. He safely brought his plane and crew back to their home base despite the AA damage it had sustained during the attack. For his actions Lieutenant Paxton was awarded the Navy Cross.
- 1 September 1944: Operational control of the squadron was shifted from FAW-17 to FAW-10. A detachment was returned to Manus Island, leaving five aircraft at Mios Woendi to conduct day and night anti-shipping patrols.
- 7 October 1944: Five additional crews flew to supplement the detachment at Mios Woendi for patrol duties.
- 23 October 1944: VPB-34 was relocated to San Pedro Bay, Leyte Gulf, with tender support provided by USS San Carlos, USS San Pablo, USS Orca and USS Currituck. By 6 November 1944, the squadron once again commenced its hallmark Black Cat operations, alternating with daytime air-sea rescue and evacuation missions.
- 3 December 1944: At 00:13 USS Cooper was struck by a torpedo while engaging Japanese surface craft and barges in the waters of Ormoc Bay, Leyte, Philippines. The ship broke in two and sank in less than a minute, resulting in the loss of 191 crew members and 168 survivors left struggling in the water. At 14:00 Lieutenant Frederick J. Ball and his crew were returning from a long-range reconnaissance mission and spotted the survivors floating in the bay. Ball landed his Catalina in the bay and proceeded over the next hour to pick up survivors within range of enemy shore fire. He rescued 56 sailors from the bay, and when the aircraft could hold no more Lieutenant Ball began a takeoff run that took 3 miles (4.8 km) before liftoff could be achieved. He safely returned to his base with his passengers, many of them wounded. The remaining 112 survivors were collected by another VPB-34 Catalina which taxied to safety outside the bay where they were offloaded onto another ship. For his bravery under fire Lieutenant Ball received the Navy Cross.
- 23 December 1944 – 16 January 1945: VPB-34 was relieved of combat operations and relocated to Manus Island in preparation for return to the U.S. Squadron personnel boarded USS Hollandia at NAS Kaneohe Bay on 10 January 1945, arriving at San Diego on the 16th. Upon arrival all hands were given home leave and the squadron was reduced to caretaker status.
- 7 April 1945: VPB-34 was disestablished.

== Aircraft assignments ==
The squadron was assigned the following aircraft, effective on the dates shown:

- PBY-5 - June 1942

== Home port assignments ==
The squadron was assigned to these home ports, effective on the dates shown:

- NAS Norfolk, Virginia - 16 April 1942
- NAS Coco Solo, Panama Canal Zone - 25 July 1942
- NAS Guantanamo Bay, Cuba - 10 October 1942
- NAS San Diego, California - 7 June 1943
- NAS Kaneohe Bay, Hawaii - 8 July 1943
- NAS San Diego - 16 January 1945

== See also ==
- Maritime patrol aircraft
- List of inactive United States Navy aircraft squadrons
- List of United States Navy aircraft squadrons
- List of squadrons in the Dictionary of American Naval Aviation Squadrons
- History of the United States Navy
