= Per Bäckström =

Swedish literary scholar and professor

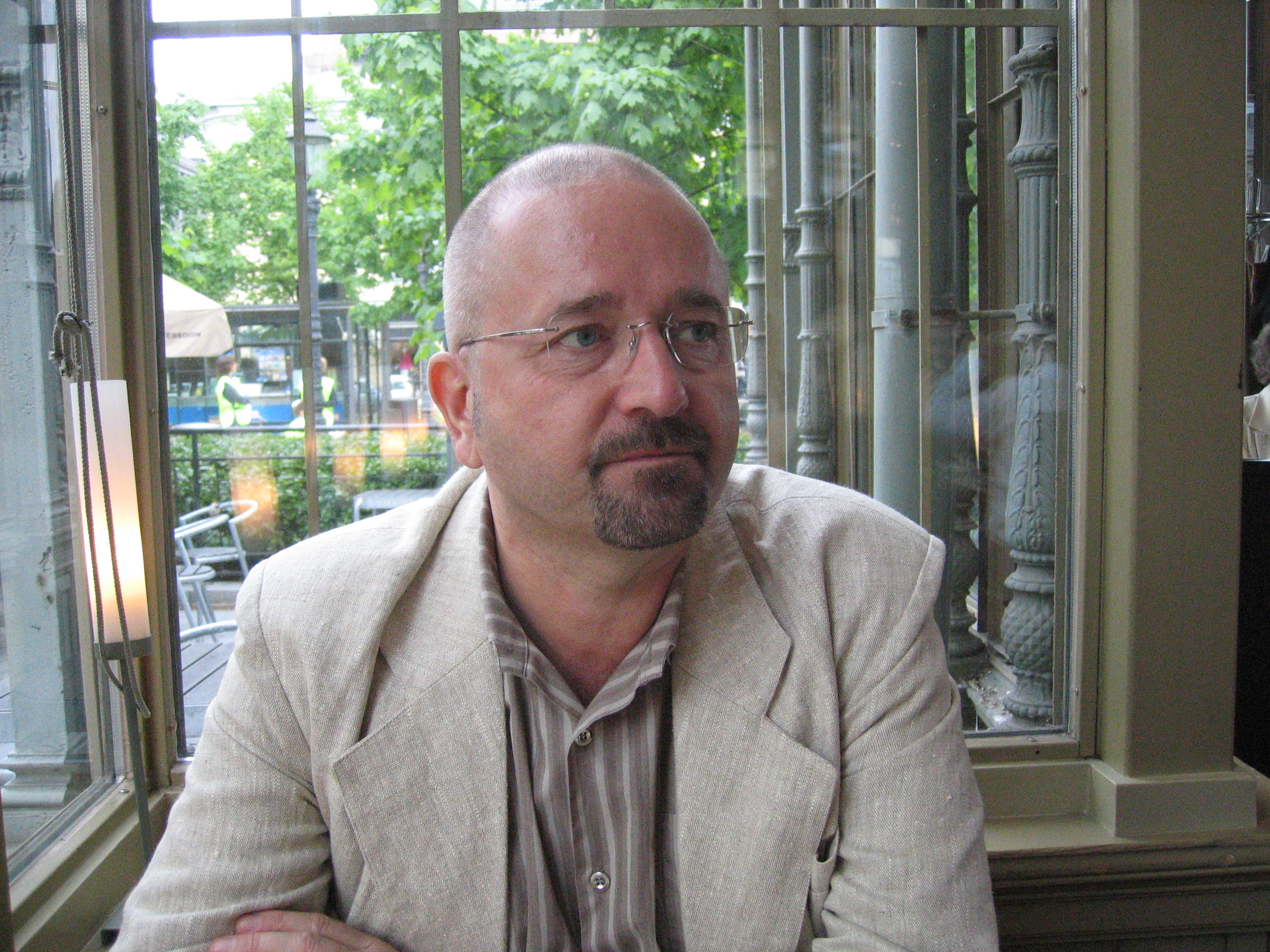
- Bäckström in 2010
- Born: April 12, 1959 (age 67); Södertälje, Sweden
- Occupation: Professor in comparative literature
- Known for: research on avant-garde, the grotesque, experimental literature, 20th century poetry
- Spouse: Lena Liepe

Academic background
- Education: University of Lund

Academic work
- Institutions: Linnaeus University; Karlstad University; University of Tromsø

Per Bäckström (born 1959) is a Swedish literary scholar and affiliated professor in comparative literature at the Linnaeus University, Växjö, Sweden. He has worked as professor in comparative Literature, Karlstad University 2010–2019, and as associate professor at the Department of Culture and Literature, University of Tromsø, Norway 1996–2010. He took part in the founding of European Network for Avant-garde and Modernism Studies (EAM) in 2007, and was the leader of the Membership Commission 2007–2011. He has published studies on Bruno K. Öijer, Henri Michaux, Gunnar Ekelöf, Mikhail Bakhtin, intermediality, the grotesque, concrete poetry, performance, avant-garde and neo-avant-garde. He has made a critical reading of Michel Riffaterre's Semiotics of Poetry, where he introduces Riffaterre's theory, explains why it failed to make success, and criticizes it for its lack of consistency when it comes to experimental poetry. He has especially studied the use of the notions of “modernism” and “avant-garde” in Romance speaking languages versus English, and the role of the peripheries in relation to the supposed centres of the avant-garde in the 20th Century. He currently is working on the Swedish avant-gardist Öyvind Fahlström and The Anti-Aesthetics of Rock.

== Bibliography ==
- 2003 Aska, Tomhet & Eld. Outsiderproblematiken hos Bruno K. Öijer (Ash, Emptiness & Fire. The Outsider in Bruno K. Öijer), (Ph.D.-thesis) Lund: Ellerström.
- 2003 Sense and Senses in Aesthetics, Per Bäckström & Troels Degn Johansson (eds.), Gothenburg: NSU Press.
- 2005 Enhet i mångfalden. Henri Michaux och det groteska (Unity in the Plenitude. Henri Michaux and the Grotesque), Lund: Ellerström.
- 2007 Centre-Periphery. The Avant-Garde and the Other, Per Bäckström (ed.), Nordlit. University of Tromsø, no. 21.
- 2007 Le Grotesque dans l’œuvre d’Henri Michaux. Qui cache son fou, meurt sans voix, Paris: L’Harmattan.
- 2010 Vårt brokigas ochellericke! Om experimentell poesi (Our Gaudy Andornot!. On Experimental Poetry), Lund: Ellerström.
- 2010 Samspill mellom kunstartene. Modernisme i nordisk lyrikk 4 (Interplay between the Arts. Modernism in Nordic Poetry), Hadle Oftedal Andersen, Per Bäckström & Unni Langås (eds.), Helsinki: University of Helsinki.
- 2011 Norsk avantgarde (Norwegian Avant-Garde), Per Bäckström & Bodil Børset (eds.), Oslo: Novus.
- 2014 Decentring the Avant-Garde, Per Bäckström & Benedikt Hjartarson (eds.), Amsterdam & New York: Rodopi, Avantgarde Critical Studies.
- 2023 Allt kan bli aktiverat och skapande liv. Öyvind Fahlströms processuella estetik, Malmö: Ellerströms förlag.
