= Lena Liepe =

Swedish art historian

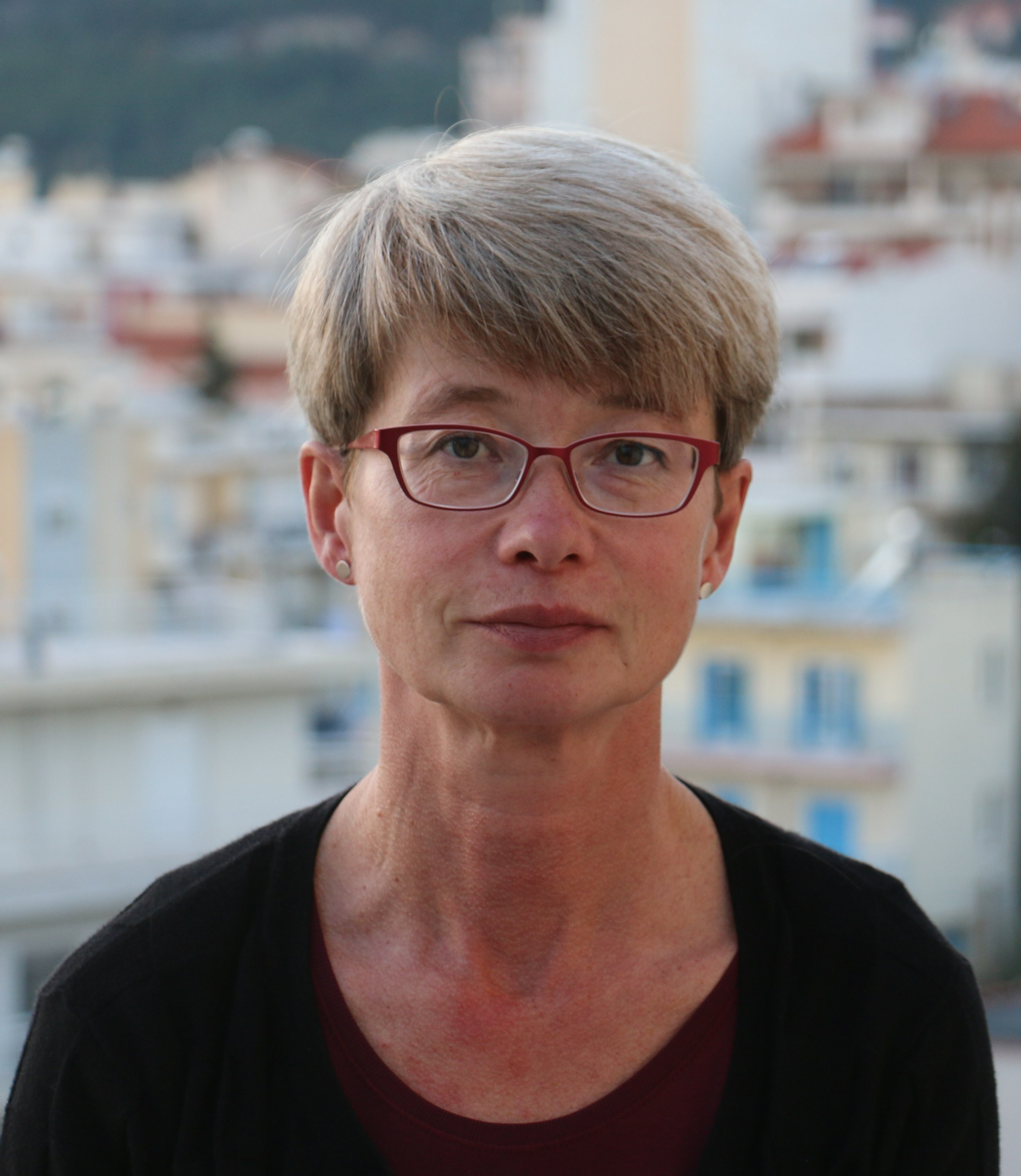
- Lena Liepe in the Swedish institute 2016, Kavala, Greece.
- Born: September 14, 1962 (age 64); Lund, Sweden
- Occupation: Professor
- Known for: research on medieval art history
- Spouse: Per Bäckström

Academic background
- Education: University of Lund, Sweden

Lena Liepe, born 1962, is a Swedish art historian, who since 2017 has been a professor in art history at Linnaeus University, Sweden.

== Achievements ==
She has worked at the University of Lund, Sweden, the University of Tromsø, Norway and the University of Oslo, Norway. Her main research areas are medieval art history, art theory and method, genus perspective on medieval art, and icelandic medieval illuminated manuscripts. In her research she has focused on how museums in Sweden grew out of 19th-century displays of medieval church art, and for the moment she completes a major work on the importance of relics in medieval church art. Her broad approach to the study of medieval art and illuminations has had a deep impact on the Nordic research in the different areas she has covered, and she has also been recognized internationally.

== Awards ==
She is a member of the Norwegian Academy of Science and Letters, the International Centre for Medieval Art (ICMA) and the Swedish Art Critics Association (AICA). She has received two of the largest prizes for research in the humanities in the Nordic countries: Jarl Gallén’s prize 2016 to “a renowned Nordic medieval historian”, and Gad Rausing’s prize 2019 for “her pioneering and profound studies of Nordic medieval art”.

== Bibliography ==
- 1995 Den medeltida träskulpturen i Skåne. Produktion och förvärv (The Medieval Wooden Sculpture in Scania. Production and Acquisition). Skånsk senmedeltid och renässans 14, Lund: Lund University Press (Ph.D.-thesis).
- 1995 Den medeltida träskulpturen i Skåne. En bilddokumentation (The Medieval Wooden Sculpture in Scania. A documentation in Pictures). Skånsk senmedeltid och renässans 15, Lund: Lund University Press (volume of pictures for Ph.D.-thesis).
- 2001 Medieval Stone Churches of Northern Norway. The Interpretation of Architecture as a Historical Process, Tromsø: Ravnetrykk 25.
- 2003 Den medeltida kroppen. Kroppens och könets ikonografi i nordisk medeltid (The Medieval Body. The Iconography of Body and Genus in Nordic Middle Ages), Lund : Nordic Academic Press.
- 2003 Tegn, symbol og tolkning: Om forståelse og fortolkning af middelalderens bilder (Sign, Symbol and Interpretation. On Understanding and Interpretation of Pictures in the Middle Ages), Köpenhamn: Museum Tusculanum.
- 2007 Konst och visuell kultur i Sverige. Före 1809 (Art and Visual Culture in Sweden. Before 1809), Stockholm: Atlantis.
- 2009 Studies in Icelandic Fourteenth Century Book Painting, Reykholt: Snorrastofa, rit. vol. VI.
- 2018 A Case for the Middle Ages. The Public Display of Medieval Church Art in Sweden 1847–1943, Stockholm: The Royal Swedish Academy of Letters, History and Antiquities.
