= Norman L. Paxton =

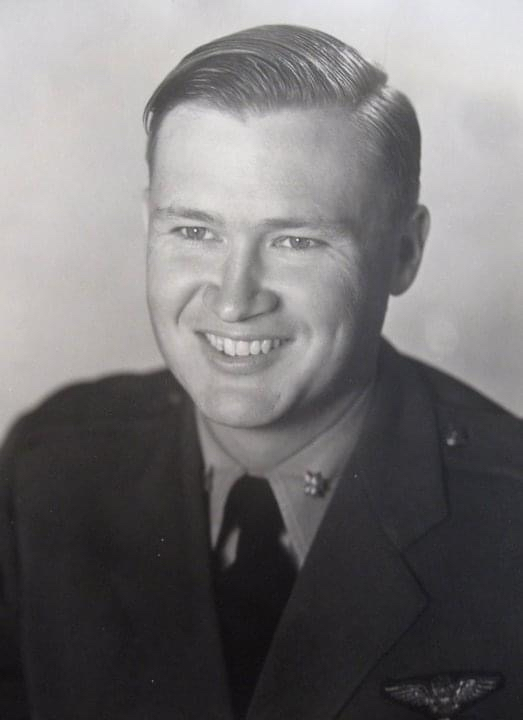
- Official U.S. Navy portrait, c. 1941–1945
- Born: June 6, 1917; Los Angeles, California, U.S.
- Died: November 16, 2010 (aged 93); Merritt Island, Florida, U.S.
- Spouse: Dorothy Rhea Kenniston (m. December 20, 1941)
- Children: 4
- Military career
- Allegiance: United States
- Branch: United States Navy
- Service years: 1939–c. 1960s
- Rank: Captain
- Unit: Patrol Bombing Squadron 34 (VPB-34)
- Commands: Executive Officer, VPB-34 (1944–45)
- Conflicts: Pacific War
- Awards: Navy Cross; Distinguished Flying Cross (3 awards)

Norman Lester Paxton (June 6, 1917 – November 16, 2010) was a United States Navy aviator who flew PBY-5 Catalina flying boats with Patrol Squadron 34 (later Patrol Bombing Squadron 34, VPB-34), the "Black Cats", during the Pacific theater of World War II, where he served as the squadron's executive officer. He was awarded the Navy Cross for a night attack on a Japanese freighter-transport in the South Molucca Sea on July 31, 1944, and the Distinguished Flying Cross for sustained operations over the Bismarck Sea in January and February 1944; he was subsequently awarded the DFC twice more, and by 1946 was credited with three awards of the medal. He retired from the Navy with the rank of Captain.

== Early life and education ==
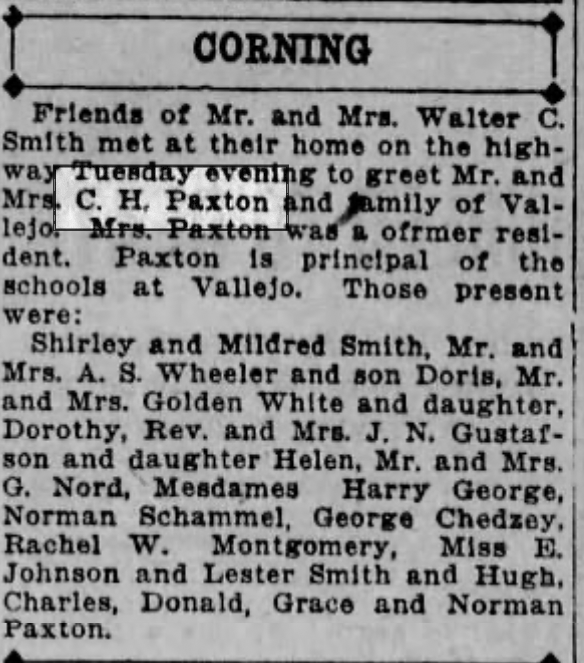
The Corning column of The Sacramento Bee, April 3, 1920, names the five Paxton children, including Norman.

Paxton was born on June 6, 1917, in Los Angeles, California, one of the five children of Charles Hugh Paxton and Grace Beatrice Paxton (née Dorn). His father graduated from Stanford University in May 1907 with an A.B. in mechanical engineering, and his mother, also Stanford class of 1907, received her A.B. in English the same month; they married in Corning, California, on April 20, 1908.

The elder Paxton spent his later career in California public education. During Norman's early childhood the family lived in Vallejo, California, where his father was vice-principal of Vallejo High School, and in 1920 they moved to Redwood City, California, where his father taught science and mathematics and coached athletics at Sequoia Union High School. In July 1921 the family left Redwood City for Riverdale, where his father had accepted a high-school principalship. By the late 1920s the family lived in Inglewood, California, and his father was on the faculty of the Southern Branch of the University of California in Los Angeles as an associate in mechanic arts, appearing in the university's Teachers College catalogs into the 1930s. His older brother Hugh C. Paxton, later a nuclear physicist and head of the critical assemblies group at Los Alamos National Laboratory, held a doctorate and was based in New York City by 1941. Paxton received a Bachelor of Arts degree in geology from the University of California, Los Angeles in 1939. At UCLA he was a member of the geology honor society Sigma Gamma Epsilon and played three seasons of varsity water polo.

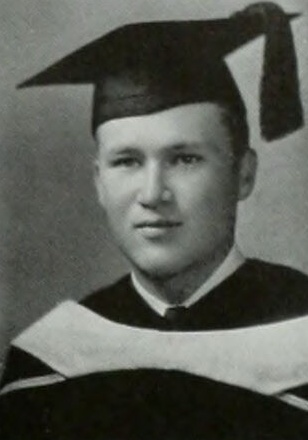
Paxton in the 1939 UCLA yearbook

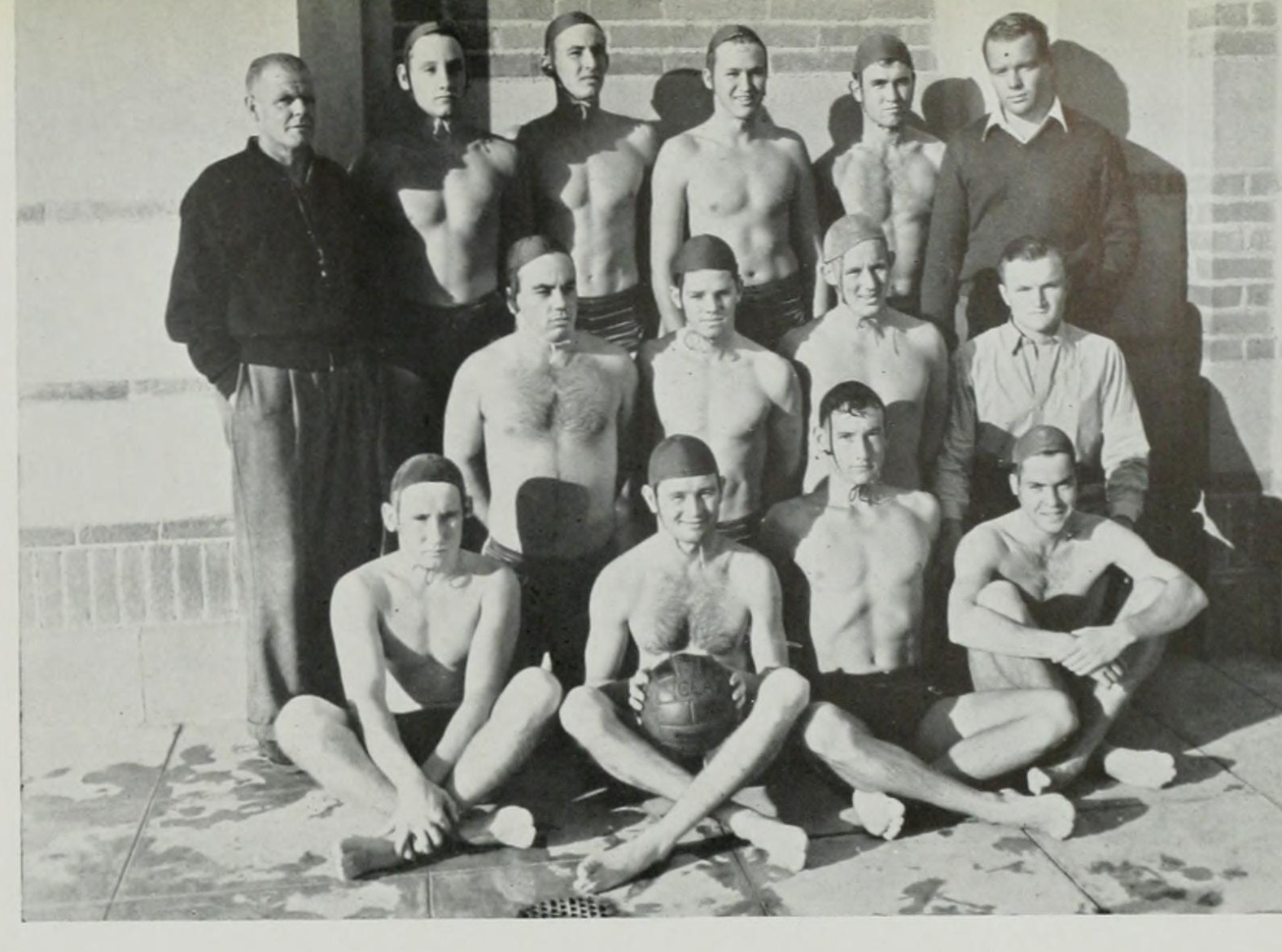
The UCLA water polo squad of 1938–39; Paxton stands in the third row

In July 1939, Paxton was named to the fifth and final 1939 class of cadets selected for Naval Aviation training at the Long Beach Naval Reserve Aviation Base in California. The class began primary flight training there on September 15, 1939, under the base's commanding officer, Commander Thomas A. Gray Jr. Paxton was formally appointed a Naval Aviation Cadet by the Secretary of the Navy on December 25, 1939, with the oath of office administered by Commander Gray.

== World War II service ==
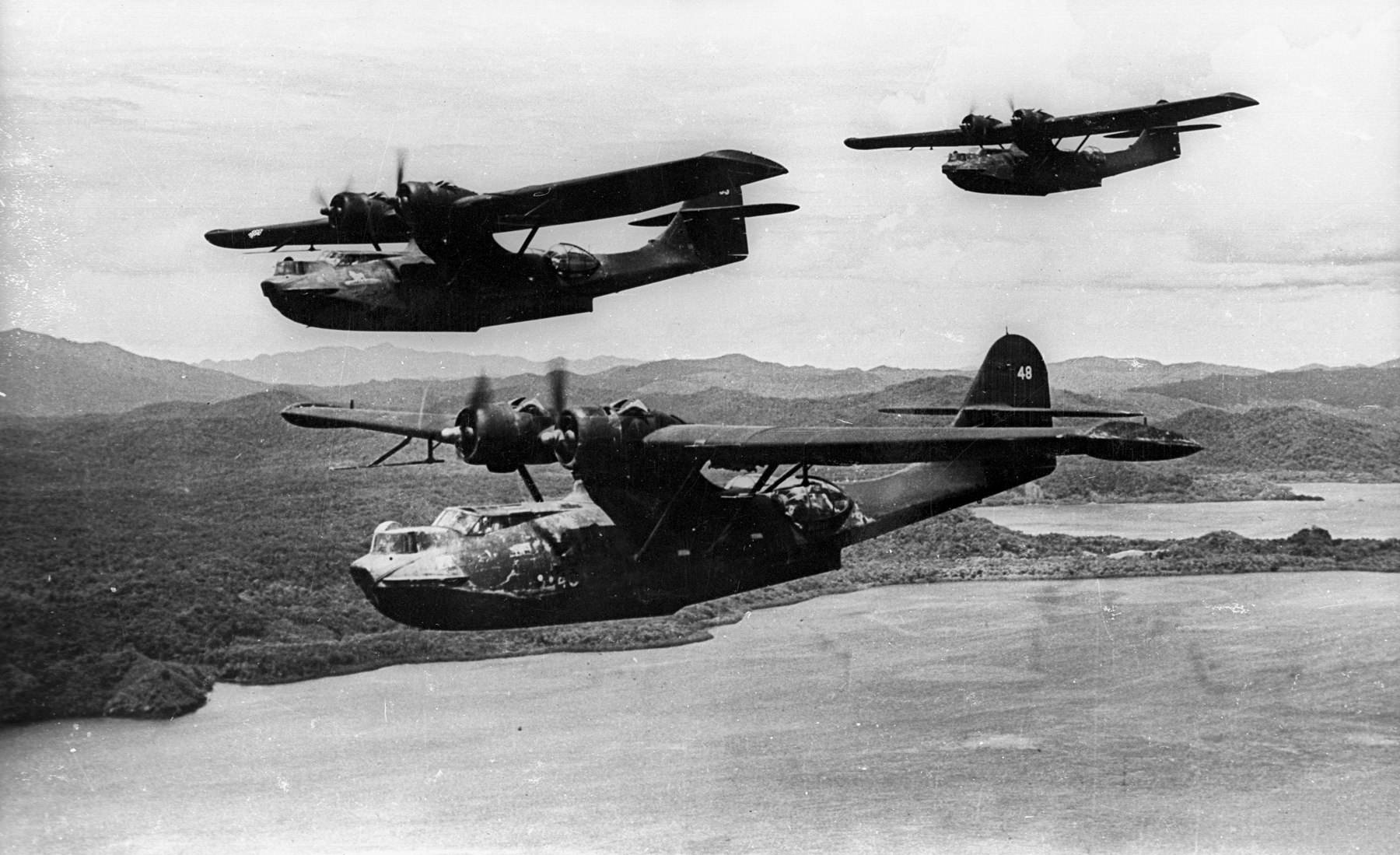
"Black Cat" PBY-5A Catalinas of VP-52 over the southwest Pacific, December 1943

Paxton entered flight training following his December 1939 cadet appointment. He completed training and was designated a naval aviator by December 1941, when he held the rank of Ensign. By October 1944 he had been promoted to Lieutenant and was serving in Patrol Squadron 34 (VP-34), which was redesignated Patrol Bombing Squadron 34 (VPB-34) on October 1, 1944. By May 1945 he had been promoted to Lieutenant Commander and was serving as the squadron's executive officer under commanding officer Lt. Cmdr. Vadym V. Utgoff.

The squadron operated PBY-5 Catalinas painted matte black in the "Black Cat" low-altitude night-attack role against Japanese shipping, flying from forward bases at Port Moresby, Samarai Island, Langemak Bay, and Mios Woendi. Over the course of its Pacific deployment, VPB-34 was credited with sinking or damaging 29 enemy ships — including six warships — and with rescuing 281 allied military personnel; for these operations the squadron received the Presidential Unit Citation.

=== Distinguished Flying Cross ===
Paxton received the Distinguished Flying Cross for "extraordinary achievement while participating in aerial flight as Pilot of a Catalina over the Bismarck Sea on 5 and 16 January 1944 and on 4 February 1944".

=== Navy Cross action, July 31, 1944 ===
Story of the Black Cats (1947), a U.S. Navy film on the Catalina night squadrons

On the night of July 31, 1944, operating from Mios Woendi after the squadron's July 16, 1944, redeployment from Samarai, Paxton attacked a Japanese freighter-transport anchored under escort in the South Molucca Sea. A contemporary news account in the Jacksonville Journal reported that he dropped four bombs on the target and its two destroyer escorts; the transport was estimated as "probably sunk", and his Catalina returned to base despite damage from anti-aircraft fire. His Navy Cross citation reads in part:

Lieutenant Paxton skillfully located a large enemy freighter-transport, protected by two escorts, at anchor in a small harbor, and attacked in bright moonlight although he knew the enemy force had been alerted and was in an advantageous tactical position to defend itself. Gliding to a low altitude in the face of an intense barrage of anti-aircraft fire which severely damaged his aircraft, he scored two direct hits and two near misses on the merchant vessel, resulting in its destruction, and then safely brought his plane back to base despite its damaged condition.

The Hall of Valor database header gives the action date as "July 31, 1945", which is a typographical error; the citation text and the VPB-34 operational record place the action on July 31, 1944.

== Postwar career ==
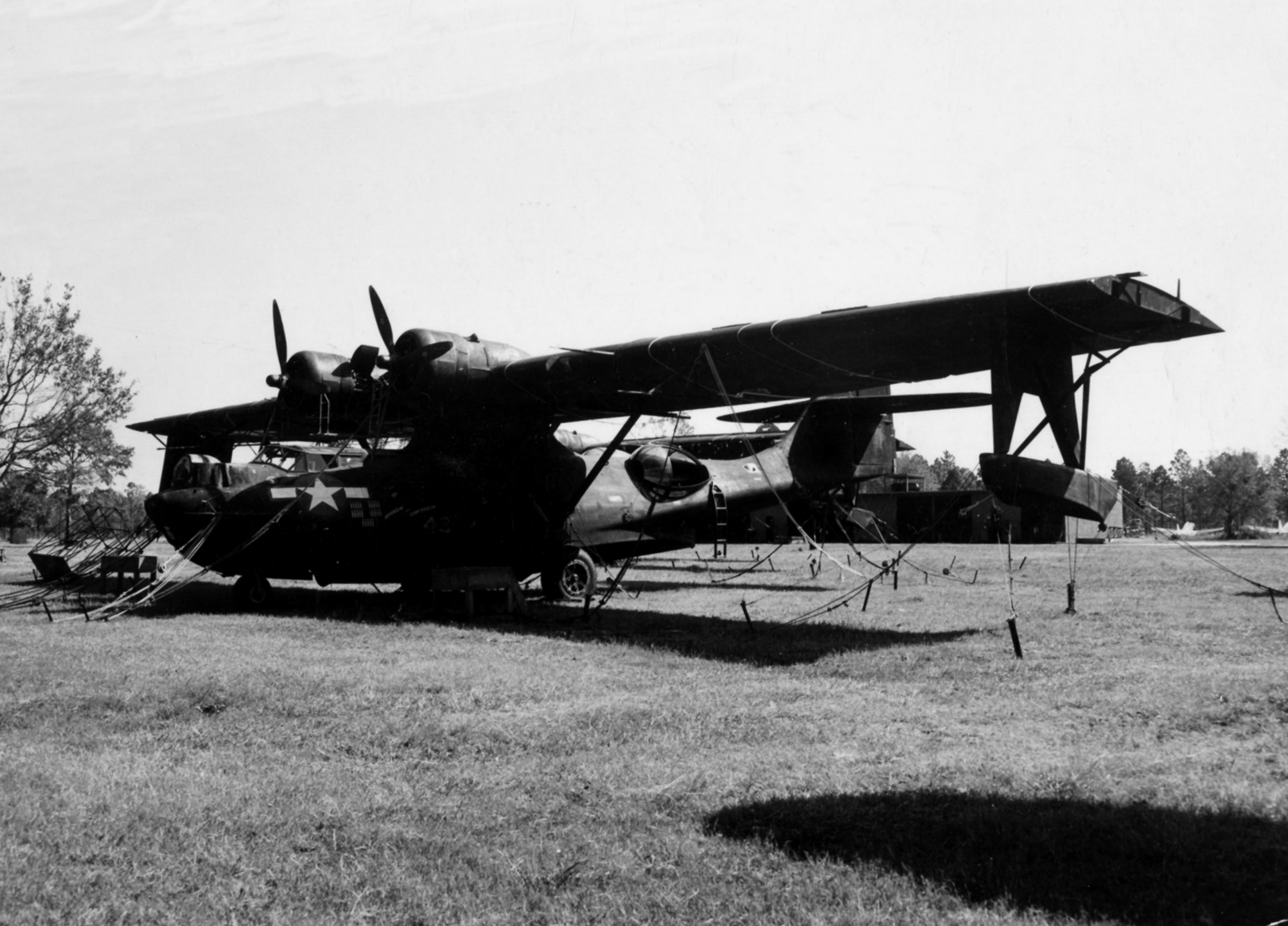
A combat-veteran "Black Cat" PBY-5A, sent to Naval Air Station Jacksonville for training use, 1944

After the war Paxton remained in the Navy. In August 1946 he was serving as ground training officer on the staff of Rear Admiral Ralph E. Davison, Chief of Naval Air Advanced Training, at the Jacksonville Naval Air Station. During 1945 and 1946 he spoke to several Jacksonville civic groups, including the Civitan Club and the Exchange Club, describing his squadron's Pacific operations and discussing the psychology of combat fatigue and fear in night-flying aircrews. In August 1946 he addressed the Exchange Club on "Night Flying Over Japan". It was, he said, "anticipation and pre-flight fear that wore men down". He also recounted his crew's experience under anti-aircraft fire from a Japanese convoy, observing that the crewmen who were kept busy showed the least fear. The Florida Times-Union reported:

Describing the fears which faced the crews of the night flying planes, Commander Paxton told the club that "fear, like pain, is quite endurable and not much worse than the common household variety." He said the normal person can register just so much fear and no more and that fear, over a long period of time, causes combat fatigue.

— The Florida Times-Union, August 15, 1946

By June 1953, when his father died in California, Paxton was stationed at Naval Air Station Patuxent River, Maryland. He ultimately retired with the rank of Captain. By the time of his death he was living in Merritt Island, Florida, on Florida's Space Coast.

== Personal life and death ==
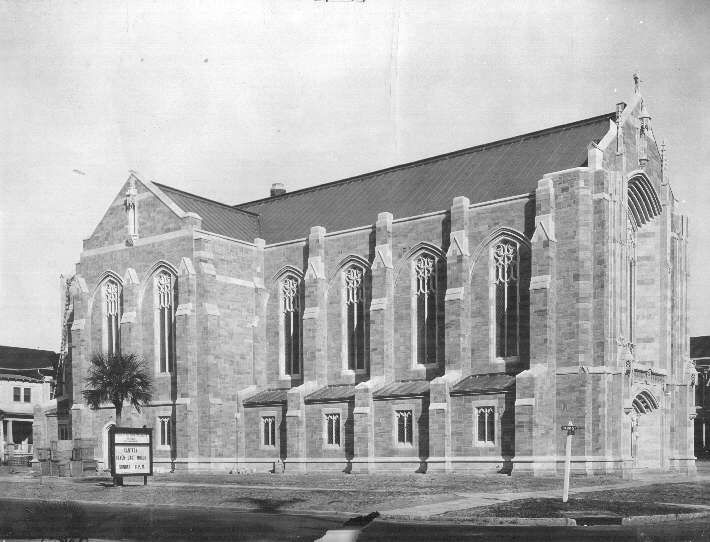
The Church of the Good Shepherd, Jacksonville, photographed c. 1920; the Paxtons married there in December 1941

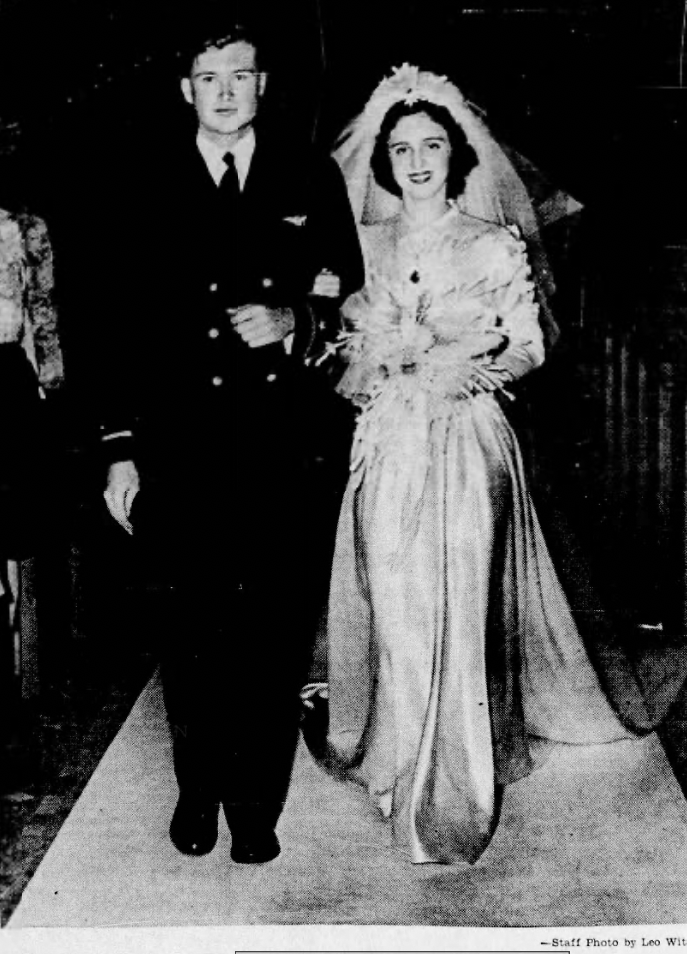
Ensign and Mrs. Paxton leaving the Church of the Good Shepherd, Jacksonville, after their wedding on December 20, 1941 (Jacksonville Journal staff photograph)

Paxton, then an Ensign, married Dorothy Rhea Kenniston (born February 14, 1916, in Jacksonville, Florida) on December 20, 1941, at the Church of the Good Shepherd in Jacksonville; the Rev. Malcolm Lockhart officiated, and Paxton's brother Dr. Hugh C. Paxton served as best man. Dorothy, a schoolteacher, was the daughter of the late Arthur A. Kenniston and his widow. The couple had four children, three sons and a daughter.

Paxton died on November 16, 2010, in Merritt Island, Florida, at the age of 93; his wife had predeceased him. He was survived by his four children, eight grandchildren, and three great-grandchildren. A memorial service was held at St. Mark's Episcopal Church in Cocoa, Florida, on November 20, 2010.

== Awards and decorations ==
Navy Cross
Distinguished Flying Cross with two 5/16 inch gold stars (three awards)
