= Chrysis Painter =

5th-century BC Attic vase painter

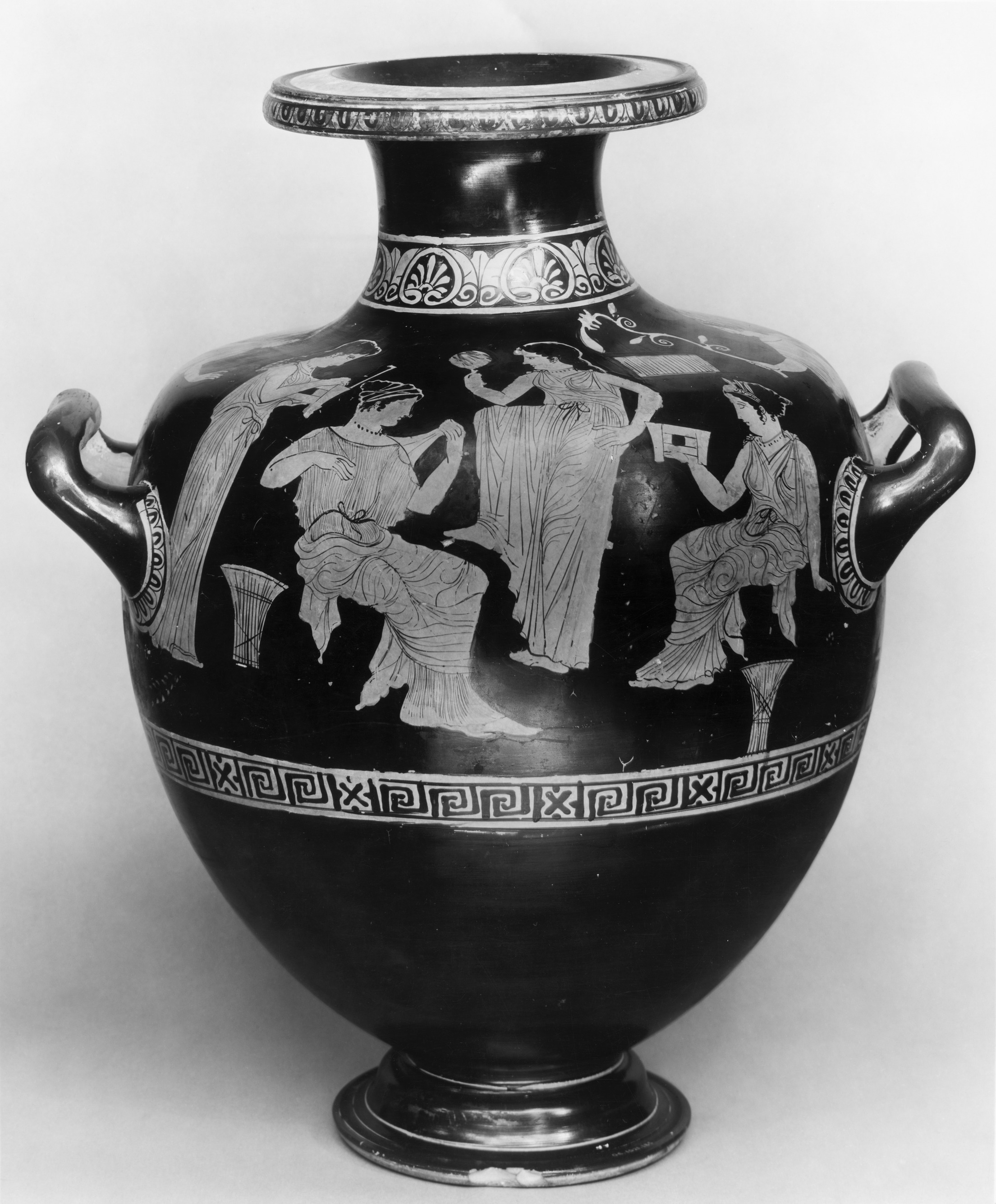
Red-figure Hydria by the Chrysis Painter, c. 420–410 BCE, Metropolitan Museum of Art.

The Chrysis Painter was an anonymous ancient Greek red-figure vase painter who worked in Athens around 420–410 BC. He is identified by his name vase, a hydria now kept in the Metropolitan Museum of Art in New York (accession number 06.1021.185). which has the name "Chrysis" (ΧΡΥΣΙΣ) inscribed next to the figure of a woman. He has been described as belonging to the school of the Dinos Painter.

A total of five pieces have been ascribed to the Chrysis Painter. Another of them is kept in the British Museum in London (vase E503).
