= Crisis (Majfud novel) =

2012 book by Jorge Majfud

- Author: Jorge Majfud
- Language: Spanish
- Series: 2
- Genre: Novel
- Publisher: Baile del Sol
- Publication date: 2012
- Publication place: United States
- ISBN: 978-84-15019-97-8
- Preceded by: La ciudad de la Luna (novel)
- Followed by: El pasado siempre vuelve (short stories)

Crisis is the seventh book of the Uruguayan American writer and literature professor Jorge Majfud. This fourth installment is based on the experiences of the author both as a migrant and a Latino out.

== Plot summary ==
This novel focuses on Latin-American immigrants’ drama in the US, particularly undocumented experiences. In a deeper sense, Crisis talks about the universal experiences of people getting away from a geographical region, evidently seeking a better way of life but in truth, running away, escaping from realism distinguished as unjust but solved rarely by moving to another place.

Escaping, moving, and missing persons are like regular characters in the novel of Jorge Majfud, which record their courses to their own identity's discovery in various situations and realities. The characters within the novel encounter obstacles in terms of cultural, economic and moral cruelties as unavoidable factors of their experiences – as existential and social living beings.

According to the author Alberto García-Teresa, Crisis “is formed by the juxtaposition of fragments from different stories, headed with the date, place (different towns in the USA located close to the southern borders) and the value of the Dow Jones Index. [...] At the same time, the multiplicity of cities in which we can find (apparently) the same characters, works as a hint about the wandering life of undocumented immigrants. In this way we obtain a novel with a collective main character in which we have no loss of individuality. Crisis turns out as a moving book, representing a hard story, full of injustice, pain and abuse of authority. The author explores the fears, dreams and hopes of the immigrants through representative scenes, with a great symbolic and metonymic value, happening to a specific character, even though they could also happen to any other. In fact, the dislocation works well to globalize the event, since it is possible for them to happen in one same place like in any other. On the one hand, it plays with diverse kinds of narrator and focuses on the different spheres involved: migrants, family members, mafias, employers, and local workers. [...] Majfud shows a great success using this kind of construction in his novel, as he fosters his discourse targets and, by itself, the structure adds content in the same direction. As a result, it is a very rich work, in which tens of characters wander and try to survive in a world governed by a ruthless economic system. This way, the bright denunciation of Majfud appeals to dignity and humanism in a bitter and discouraging story.”
