= Critical Condition =

Critical condition is a medical state.

Critical Condition may also refer to:

- Critical Condition (film), a 1987 comedy film
- "Critical Condition" (Knots Landing), a 1981 television episode
- "Critical Condition" (Sex and the City), a 2002 television episode

== See also ==
- Condition Critical, an album by Quiet Riot
- Condition Critical, an album by White Noise Owl
- Conditional Critical, a thrash metal band from New Jersey
