= Crisis (game) =

Play-by-mail role-playing wargame

- Other names: CRISIS
- Designers: Rick Barr
- Publishers: Rick Barr (US), Mystery and Adventure Games (UK), Timepatterns (UK
- Years active: ~1981 to 2000 or beyond
- Genres: Role-playing, wargame, grand strategy
- Languages: English
- Playing time: fixed, about 8–12 turns
- Chance: medium-high
- Materials required: Instructions, order sheets, turn results, paper, pencil
- Media type: Play-by-mail or email

Crisis (or CRISIS) is a closed-end, computer-moderated, play-by-mail wargame. It was developed and published in the United States by 1981 by Rick Barr. Additional companies later licensed the game in the United Kingdom, including Mystery and Adventure Games and Timepatterns, the latter having sole UK publication rights by 2000. Multiple reviewers found the game similar to the boardgame Risk, while others compared it to the PBM game Nuclear Destruction. About nine players were in each game which last around 8–12 turns. The game setting was 21st century earth with 42 countries, some notional or supranational. Combat, including nuclear missile exchanges, diplomacy, and intrigue were elements of gameplay. It received mixed reviews in various gaming magazines in the 1980s.

== History and development ==
Rick Barr created Crisis. Reviewer Michael Gray thought it similar to Risk and Nuclear Destruction. Bob McLain also compared the game to Risk. Games generally lasted 12–20 turns. In 1988, Ian Lacey announced that a new version of the game was pending launch with increased complexity and features. Added features would include: "paratroopers, professional spies, sabotage, NPC countries that play as players ... continent domination, radiation levels and new turncards". By February–March 1988, Rick Barr had ceased publishing. As of December 1988, Mystery and Adventure Games was publishing Crisis in the UK. By 1995, the game had become popular in the United Kingdom and Timepatterns and other UK companies were publishing the game. In 1995, Bob McLain purchased the game rights from Rick Barr and resold it to Timepatterns which was the sole UK publisher by 2000.

== Gameplay ==
The game was set on a global map comprising 42 countries in the 21st century. (Note: Countries also included those such as the fictional "Astrakan", and the European Economic Community.) It was computer-moderated. Each game had about nine players. Players and non-player countries began with an initial population and array of factories and armies. Game speed was high at the outset and remained high.

Actions included factory building, construction of weapons (including intercontinental ballistic missiles (ICBMs)), and spying. Diplomacy among players was also an important factor. Losing all population or becoming conquered ended a player's game. The last remaining player won.

== Reception ==
Bob McLain reviewed the game in a 1983 issue of PBM Universal. He praised it for its "straightforward, easily learnable concept, and unpretentiousness", recommending readers to "Try it." In a summer 1985 issue of Flagship, McLain gave it a "good" review, praising it for simplicity and excitement while noting unpredictability as a drawback. Mark England reviewed the game in a 1988 issue of Crash. He felt the game's simplicity could be a drawback, which might actually appeal to the PBM novice. He thought that experienced PBM gamers may be less interested.

== See also ==
- List of play-by-mail games

== Bibliography ==
- Gray, Michael (May 1984). "PBM: Problems By Mail". Dragon. No. 85. p. 22.
- Kavanaugh, Brendon; England, Mark (June 1988). "PBM Mailbox: Crisis? What Crisis?". Crash. No. 53.
- Lacey, Ian (November 1988). "PBM Mailbox: New Laboratory". Crash. No. 58.
- Lacey, Ian (December 1988). "PBM Mailbox: Cheap Games!". Crash. No. 59.
- Lunsford, M.T. (February–March 1988). "Taking Inventory: Crisis". The D2 Report. No. 16. pp. 15–17.
- McLain, Bob (November–December 1983). "CRISIS". PBM Universal. No. 1. p. 29.
- McLain, Bob (Summer 1985). "A British Christmas: CRISIS, Eggnog, and Dead Algerians". Flagship. No. 7. pp. 4–7.
- McLain, Bob (May–June 2000). "CRISIS!: Tequila and Dead South Americans". Flagship. No. 85. pp. 19–20.
