= La reina de América =

2001 novel by Jorge Majfud

- Author: Jorge Majfud
- Original title: La reina de América
- Language: Spanish
- Series: 2
- Publisher: Baile del Sol
- Publication date: 2001
- Publication place: Uruguay
- ISBN: 9788495309754
- Preceded by: Crítica de la pasión pura
- Followed by: La ciudad de la Luna

La reina de América ("The Queen of America") is a novel by Uruguayan author Jorge Majfud. It was published by Baile del Sol in 2002.

== Plot summary ==
This novel is about a family of Spanish immigrants in the nineteen-sixties and the adventures of Consuelo, the daughter of a prostitute to whom the title refers. It is set mainly in Montevideo and Buenos Aires in the midst of the repressive Southern Cone dictatorships.

Mabel and her father run away from their financial bankruptcy in Spain to Argentina in pursuit of the American dream in the first wave of immigration of the century. On their trip, Mabel meets a Danish anarchist named Jacobsen and falls in love with him. Mabel's father dies in Montevideo and this “queen of America” stays in the port's lower-class neighborhood. Several problems hinder Jacobsen's ability to return to Buenos Aires to find Mabel. Her daughter, Consuelo, is raped by one her clients but she manages to enact her vengeance in a striking and cruel way.

Set from approximately 1960 to 1990, the novel ultimately explores the themes of power, politics, sociality, gender, domesticity and culture.

== Characters ==
Mabel Moreno: an immigrant belonging to the ruined Spanish aristocracy. After her father's death in the port of Montevideo, she turns to prostitution to get by. Mabel dies in an asylum.

Consuelo Moreno: the daughter of Mabel, her father is probably Jacobsen. Consuelo is one of the main narrators. Her story begins when she finds Jacobsen in Buenos Aires after her mother's death, but he is immobilized in a wheelchair and cannot speak. Like her mother, she loses her mind.

Jacobsen: a Danish anarchist. He never finds Mabel. He is persecuted by the military in Buenos Aires. He seems to have the most critical voice in the novel.

El Tito: Mabel's client. He abuses Consuelo and persuades her to abort her son. When Consuelo receives an inheritance from Mabel's cousin, she takes revenge by paying two men to rape him.

Vicente Zubizarreta: Mabel's cousin. Successful immigrant. Ambiguous sexuality. He takes care of Consuelo until his suicide.

Abayuba: Consuelo's boyfriend, a typical member of the working-class unemployed youth.

Other minor characters: Argentinean military officials, a Uruguayan radio announcer who has a big influence on “public opinion” (murdered by Mabel).
