= Pablo Andrés Rial =

Argentine poet and writer

- Pablo Andrés Rial in 2025
- Born: Buenos Aires, Argentina
- Occupations: Writer, poet, playwright, teacher
- Writing career
- Language: Spanish
- Notable works: La casa de barro (2023); Forzado a viajar (2024); Aves desplumadas (2024); Leonor (2025)

Pablo Andrés Rial is an Argentine poet, playwright, narrator and teacher.

== Biography ==
Rial was born in the Autonomous City of Buenos Aires and lives in Longchamps. When he was one year old, he lost his biological father and was raised by his stepfather, a key figure in his upbringing who later died from COVID-19. During his youth he suffered episodes of depression that required treatment and hospitalization.

He published poems in local media since adolescence; his first appearance was in the anthology De buena lluvia (1999), declared of cultural interest by the municipality of Almirante Brown.

In 2020 he participated in the conversation “Borges through time”, organized by the Secretariat of Art and Culture of San Andrés Cholula (Puebla) and the Argentine Embassy in Mexico City.

== Career ==
In 2023 he published the poetry collection La casa de barro with the Argentine publisher Ediciones Arroyo.

In 2024 he released Forzado a viajar with Paserios Ediciones (Mexico) and Aves desplumadas, distributed in Brazil in a bilingual edition by Ópera Editorial.

In 2025 he presented Forzado a viajar at the Benemérita Universidad Autónoma de Puebla (BUAP) and launched the editorial project “Libro con alas”, an experimental book design that uses a base sheet and two lateral flaps to combine different forms of reading. According to press reports, it was declared of cultural and educational interest by the Honorable Deliberative Council and of provincial legislative interest by the Chamber of Deputies of the Province of Buenos Aires. The same year he published Leonor with Caleta Olivia, a poetry collection in the form of poetic correspondence.

Rial contributes to cultural magazines in Argentina, Mexico and Spain. Some of his poems have been translated into French, Italian and English.In 2026, the Italian edition of Forzado a viajar (Costretto a viaggiare), was published in Italy.

== Bibliography ==
- La casa de barro (2023)
- Forzado a viajar (2024)
- Aves desplumadas (2024)
- Leonor (2025)
