= Crises (disambiguation) =

Crises refers to the plural of crisis.

Crises may also refer to:

== Acronym ==
- CRISES, French research Centre

== Music ==
- Crises (album) by Mike Oldfield 1983
  - Crises Tour 1983, tour by Mike Oldfield
- Crises, album by R. Stevie Moore 1983
- "Les Crises de l'Ame" by Jeanne Mas

== See also ==
- Chryses, cfr: Greek mythology, people of the Trojan War, and characters in the Iliad (Trojan priest and father of Chryseis)
- Chryses (disambiguation), is a name of several figures in Greek mythology
