= Jorge Majfud =

Uruguayan-American writer (born 1969)

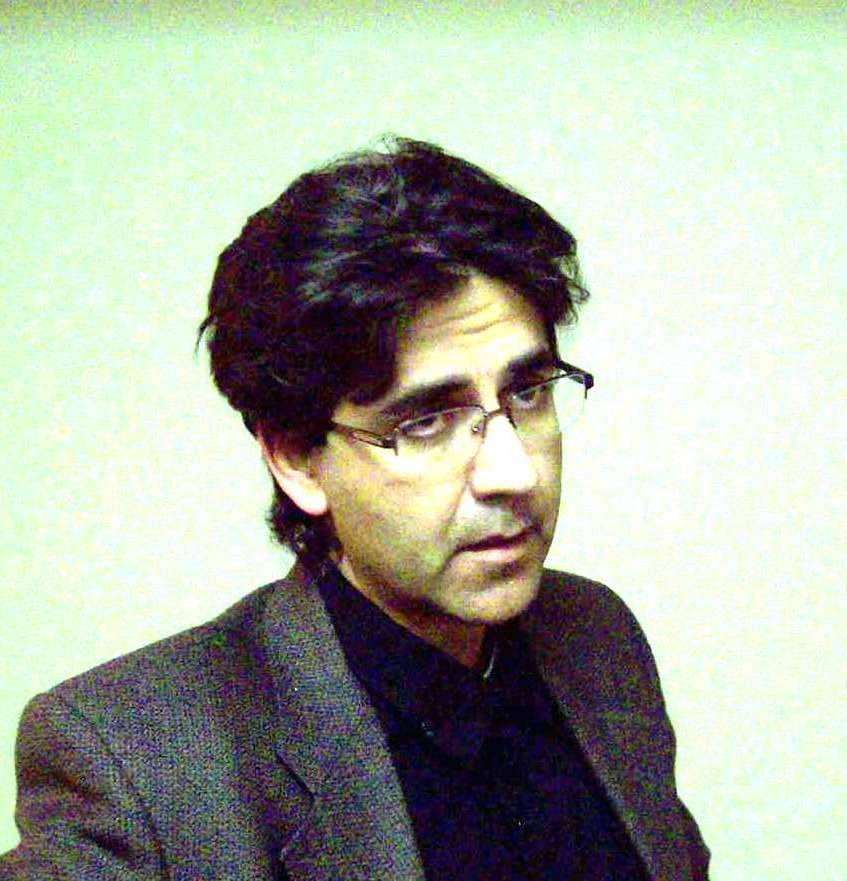
- Majfud at Jacksonville University in 2013
- Born: Jorge Antonio Majfud Albernaz; September 10, 1969 (age 57); Tacuarembo, Uruguay
- Education: University of the Republic; University of Georgia (MA, PhD)

Jorge Antonio Majfud Albernaz (born September 10, 1969) is a Uruguayan–American professor and writer.

== Early life ==
Majfud was born on September 10, 1969, in Tacuarembó, Uruguay. He is of paternal Lebanese descent of the Christian faith, as his grandparents immigrated from Lebanon to Uruguay. His father, born to an impoverished family of 12 children, was a carpenter by trade and his mother, Marlene (née Albernaz; 1940-1984), was a sculptor. His father moved to Montevideo during the 1950s to study carpentry and radiotelephony, ultimately becoming a successful businessman in different sectors, including in agriculture, banking, and pharmaceutical, although he returned to Tacuarembó before Jorge was born, leading an austere life.

== Education ==
In 1996, Majfud received a professional degree in architecture and engineering from the University of the Republic. He worked as a structural engineer, specializing in the analysis and design of building structures, while traveling to different continents and gathering material that would later become part of his novels and essays. After his professional studies, he became a professor at the University of Costa Rica and at Escuela Técnica del Uruguay, where he taught art and mathematics. As an architect, he worked in several Latin American countries, as well as in Mozambique and Spain, to make a living while writing some of his first books. Following the economic crisis that struck the Southern Cone in 2002, Majfud accepted an offer from the University of Georgia and, in 2003, temporarily moved to the United States with his wife. He enrolled at UGA as a Teaching Assistant and later obtained a master's degree and a Ph.D. in the Department of Romance Languages.

== Career ==
Majfud is a member of the scientific committee of the Araucaria review in Spain, Phi Kappa Phi, and a Professional Member of PEN American Center. He has taught at the University of Georgia and was a professor at Lincoln University. Currently, he is a professor at Jacksonville University.

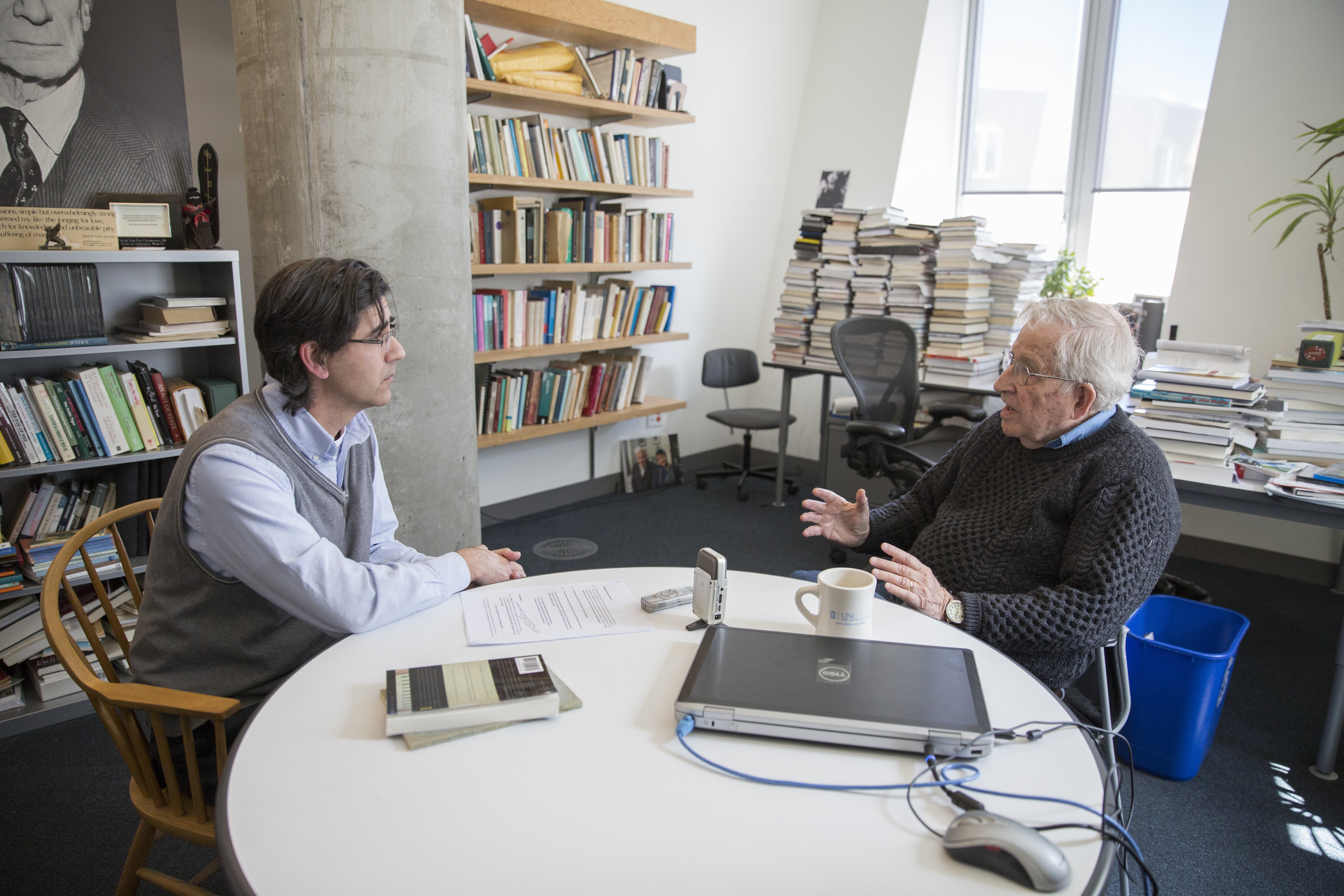
Majfud speaking with Noam Chomsky at the Massachusetts Institute of Technology, 2016.

Majfud has won many awards, including the Excellence in Research Award in Humanities and Letters in 2006, Casa de las Américas prize in 2001, a Juan Rulfo Award finalist in 2011, Faculty Award for Excellence in Scholarship and Professional Activities at Jacksonville University in 2013, and the Premio Letterario Internazionale Indipendente Settima (The Independent International Literary Award) in 2019. His novels and essays are under study in different universities in Europe, the U.S., and Latin America, and is one of the most important writers of a new generation of Uruguayan intellectuals. In 2012, readers of the American magazine Foreign Policy (now EsGlobal in Spanish) recognized him as "The Most Influential Latin American Intellectual". In 2013, he was named one of "The 10 Hispanic Authors of the Moment" by Impacto Latin News, New York's oldest Spanish-language weekly.

In 2024, Caras & Caretas magazine published that, according to artificial intelligence, Jorge Majfud was among the ten most recognized Uruguayans in the world.

He delivered public lectures at many universities and events around the world.

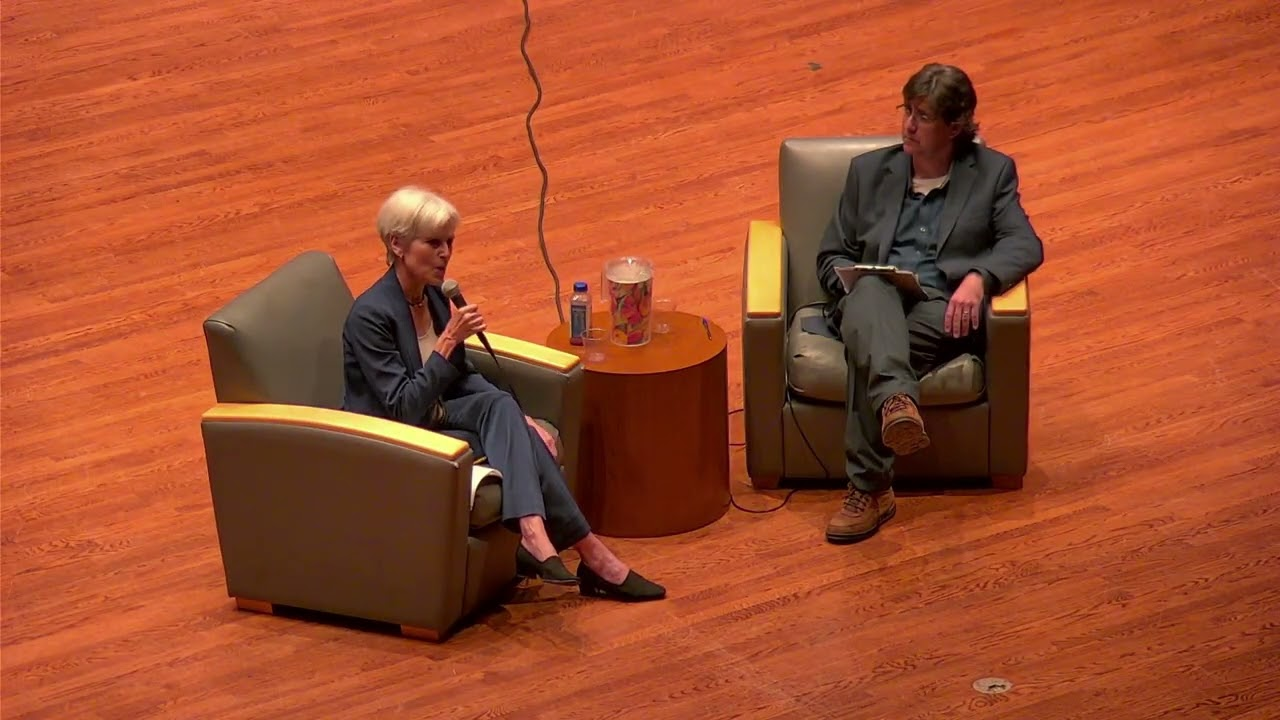
Majfud speaking with Jill Stein at Jacksonville University, 2024.

== Awards ==
He has distinguished himself in different international contests, for example:

- Mention at Premio Casa de las Américas, in Habana, Cuba in 2001, for the novel La Reina de América, "because it stands out as an intense writing regarding the established powers by the use of parody and irony," according to the panel of judges composed of Belén Gopegui (Spain), Andrés Rivera (Argentina), Mayra Santos Febres (Puerto Rico) and others
- Excellence in Research Award, University of Georgia, 2006
- Faculty Award for Excellence in Scholarship and Professional Activities, Jacksonville University, 2013.
- 2014 International Latino Book Awards Finalist
- 2019 Premio Letterario Internazionale Indipendente Award

== Works ==
His publications include:

- Hacia qué patrias del silencio / memorias de un desaparecido (novel, 1996)
- Crítica de la pasión pura (essays, 1998)
- La reina de América (novel, 2001)
- El tiempo que me tocó vivir (essays, 2004)
- The Narration of the Invisible: A Political Theo-ry of Semantic Fields (essays, 2006)
- Perdona nuestros pecados (short stories, 2007)
- La ciudad de la Luna (novel, 2009)
- Crisis (novel, 2012)
- Cyborgs (essays, 2012)
- El eterno retorno de Quetzalcoátl, 2012.
- Cuentos, audiobook, 2014
- Latin American Political Cinema, essays, 2014
- Herrmenéutica, essays, 2014
- El pasado siempre vuelve, short stories, 2014
- Algo salió mal, short stories, 2015
- El mar estaba sereno, novel, 2017
- USA. ¿Confía Dios en nosotros?, essays, 2017
- Neomedievalism. Reflections on the Post-Enlightenment Era, essays, 2018
- Tequila, novel, 2018
- The Same Fire, novel, 2019
- Perros sí, negros no, essays, 2020
- Silicone 5.0, novel, 2020
- The Wild Frontier: 200 Years of Anglo-Saxon Fanaticism in Latin America, history essay, 2021
- La privatización de la verdad. La continuidad de la ideología esclavista en Estados Unidos, essay, 2021
- El otoño de la plutocracia estadounidense, essays, 2023
- Teología del dinero, essays, 2023
- Moscas en la telaraña: Historia de la comercialización de la existencia―y sus medios, essays, 2023
- Palestine: The Vietnam of Generation Alpha, ensayos, 2023.
- La prisión sin muros: Reflexiones sobre la crisis de las democracias liberales, ensayos, 2024.
- El fin de la Pax Americana, ensayos Universidad de Valencia 2024.
- P = d.t : Outline of a Theory of Power. Theory, 2024.
- Plutocracy: Tyrannosaurs of the Anthropocene, essays, 2024.
- 1976: The Exile of Terror. History, 2024.
- Best Democracy Money Can Buy. Essays, 2025.
- Had Other Plans. Stories, 2025.
- Tawíscara: The Hijacking of Democracy, 2024. History.

As contributor or editor

- 2020, Crónicas del coronavirus (Editorial Irreverentes) ISBN 978-8417481490
- 2020, Diccionario de autobiografías intelectuales (Universidad Nacional de Lanus) ISBN 978-987-4937-54-4
- 2019, Unwanted People (University of Valencia Press, PUV) by Aviva Chomsky. ISBN 978-84-9134-456-8
- 2018, Cinco entrevistas a Noam Chomsky (Le Monde Diplomatique / Editorial Aun Creemos en los Sueños) by Michel Foucault, Ignacio Ramonet, Daniel Mermet, Jorge Majfud y Federico Kukso. ISBN 978-956-340-126-4
- 2018, "Vsa teža zakona" (Zgodbe iz Urugvaja. Antologija sodobne urugvajske kratke proze/Anthology of contemporary Uruguayan short prose). Translated by Yuri Kunaver. ISBN 978-961-6970-91-4
- 2017, The Routledge History of Latin American Culture (Edited by Carlos Manuel Salomon) ISBN 978-1138902565 Routledge Histories.
- 2017, Pertenencia. Narradores sudamericanos en Estados Unidos. Antología. (Melanie Márquez Adams, Hemil García Linares, editores). Ars Communis Editorial, Publisher. ISBN 978-0997289039.
- 2016, Ruido Blanco. Antología de cuentos de ciencia ficción uruguaya. (Mónica Marchesky, coordinador) ISBN 9974844347 M Ed.
- 2013, De la indignación a la rebeldía (con Eduardo Galeano, Carlos Taibo y Slavoj Zizek). ISBN 9788415353553. Ediciones Irreverentes.
- 2012. Ilusionistas. , by Noam Chomsky. Edition, translation, and introduction. ISBN 978-84-15353-46-1. Ediciones Irreverentes.
- 2012, Antología de Nueva York. ISBN 978-84-939322-5-1. Ediciones Irreverentes.
- 2012, Antología de ciencia ficción, 2099. ISBN 978-84-15353-38-6. Ediciones Irreverentes.
- 2011, Microantología del Microrrelato III. ISBN 978-84-15353-15-7.
- 2011, Truman, Hiroshima. ISBN 8496959872 (con Eduardo Galeano) Ediciones Irreverentes.
- 2010, El libro del voyeur. ISBN 9788496964716. Ediciones del viento.
- 2010, Microantología del Microrrelato II. ISBN 978-84-96959-76-7.
- 2010, Entre Orientales y Atlantes. Antología de relatos uruguayo-canaria. ISBN 9788415019299. Editorial Baile del Sol.
- 2007, Las palabras pueden. ISBN 9789280641608. (con Ernesto Sábato, Mario Vargas Llosa, José Saramago y otros ) United Nations Children's Fund (New York: UNICEF-UN).
- 2008, Los testimonios, de Roque Dalton. ISBN 9788496225763. Baile del Sol.
- 2008, Diccionario alternativo. ISBN 9789507866531. (con Hugo Biagini y Arturo Andrés Roig). Aguilar/Alfaguara.
- 2007, América Latina hacia su segunda independencia. ISBN 9789870406976 (con Hugo Biagini y Arturo Andrés Roig. Aguilar / Alfaguara.
- 1999, Entre siglos/Entre séculos. ISBN 9974663059.

His stories and articles have been published in daily newspapers, magazines, and readers, such as El País of Madrid, El País and La República of Montevideo, Courrier International of Paris , Rebellion, Hispanic Culture Review of George Mason University, Revista de Crítica Literaria Latinoamericana of Dartmouth College, Pegaso of the University of Oklahoma, Texas State University, Washington University Political Review, Chasqui of Arizona State University, Hispamerica of University of Maryland, United Nations Chronicle, UNICEF, Araucaria of Spain, etc. He has been the founder and editor of the magazine SigloXXI – reflexiones sobre nuestro tiempo. He is a contributor to El Pais, La República of Montevideo, La Vanguardia of Barcelona, Tiempos del Mundo of Washington, Monthly Review of New York, The Huffington Post, Milenio of Mexico, Jornada of La Paz, Panama America, El Nuevo Herald of Miami, Página/12 of Buenos Aires, Cambio16 of Spain, Centro Cervantes of Madrid, The Humanist of the American Humanist Association, Radio Uruguay, Radio Nacional de Argentina , Radio Exterior de España], Radio Popolare Roma, NTN 24 TV , Russia TV (RT), and many other daily and weekly newspapers. He is a member of the International Scientific Committee of the magazine Araucaria in Spain.

His essays and articles have been translated into Portuguese, French, English, German, Italian, Basque, Greek, and many others. He is also the editor and translator of Ilusionistas, the latest book of Noam Chomsky in Spanish (Madrid, 2012).

He has published many books with authors like Slavoj Zizek, Eduardo Galeano, Ray Bradbury, José Saramago, Mario Vargas Llosa, Carlos Fuentes, and Ernesto Sábato.

In November 2019, after the coup d'état in Bolivia, Jorge Majfud called on OAS Secretary General Luis Almagro to resign from his post. The letter went viral and was supported by millions of Latin Americans.
