= Criticality index =

Indicator in risk analysis

Criticality index is mainly used in risk analysis. The Criticality Index of an activity (task) can be expressed as a ratio (between 0 and 1) but is more often expressed as a percentage. During a (e.g. Monte Carlo) simulation tasks can join or leave the critical path for any given iteration. The Criticality Index expresses how often a particular task was on the Critical Path during the analysis. Tasks with a high Criticality Index are more likely to cause delay to the project as they are more likely to be on the Critical Path. If a task does not exist for some iterations (e.g. it is probabilistic) then it is marked as not being critical. For example, a task that existed for 50% of the iterations and was critical 50% of the time it existed would have a Criticality Index of 25%.

== Benefits ==
The Criticality Index allows you to identify tasks that are likely to cause delays to the project. By monitoring tasks with a high Criticality Index a project is less likely to be late. If a task has a 100% Criticality Index it means that during the analysis no matter how the task durations varied, the critical path always included the task. The task is therefore likely to be key in completing the project on time. Conversely tasks with a low or zero Criticality Index are much less likely to cause a delay in the project finish date.

== Limitations with Criticality index ==
Just because a task is on the Critical Path all of the time, does not always mean that the task is going to be significant to the project completion date. For example, a task that is only 1 day long is unlikely to affect the project finish but it can still have a 100% Criticality Index. To avoid this problem one must also measure the correlation between the duration of a task and the duration of the project. Spearman's Rank correlation or Pearson's Product Moment can be used to measure the correlation.
