= Criticality matrix =

In operations research and engineering, a criticality matrix is a representation (often graphical) of failure modes along with their probabilities and severities.

Severity may be classified in four categories, with Level I as most severe or "catastrophic"; Level II for "critical"; Level III for "marginal"; and Level IV for "minor".

== Example ==
For example, an aircraft might have the following matrix:

Failure mode	Severity	Probability
Collision	High	Low
Engine failure	High	Low
Ice buildup	Medium	High
