= The Crisis (newspaper) =

American newspaper

The Crisis was a newspaper published during the first half of the American Civil War by Samuel Medary that was critical of the American government's decision to limit slavery, and following the beginning of the war against the Confederate States of America, to wage war against the South. It was presented as the newspaper for favor with "Peace Democrats" (often referred to as Copperheads) - those northerners who sided with the Confederate cause during the war.

== Background ==
Medary began publishing The Crisis in Columbus, Ohio, in 1860. The name alluded to previous newspapers and broadsides during the American Revolutionary War that spoke out against British rule over the colonies. Medary's use of the name for his paper was an attempt to tie the States Rights movement to those who fought for American independence. For Copperheads, Abraham Lincoln was every bit the evil that was King George III.

During the 1863 Ohio Gubernatorial race, the newspaper endorsed Clement Vallandigham, the exiled leader of the Ohio Copperhead movement. While Vallandigham won the Democratic nomination, he lost the race to War Democrat candidate John Brough.

In 1864, charges were brought against Medary of conspiracy against the government. He was arrested, released on bond and died shortly thereafter at his home. With Medary's death went The Crisis, and with the end of the Civil War, the newspaper went out of business.
