= Nuclear criticality safety =

Field of nuclear engineering

Nuclear criticality safety is a field of nuclear engineering dedicated to the prevention of nuclear and radiation accidents resulting from an inadvertent, self-sustaining nuclear chain reaction.

Nuclear criticality safety is concerned with mitigating the consequences of a nuclear criticality accident. A nuclear criticality accident occurs from operations that involve fissile material and results in a sudden and potentially lethal release of radiation.

Nuclear criticality safety practitioners attempt to prevent nuclear criticality accidents by analyzing normal and credible abnormal conditions in fissile material operations and designing safe arrangements for the processing of fissile materials. A common practice is to apply a double contingency analysis to the operation in which two or more independent, concurrent and unlikely changes in process conditions must occur before a nuclear criticality accident can occur. For example, the first change in conditions may be complete or partial flooding and the second change a re-arrangement of the fissile material.

Controls (requirements) on process parameters (e.g., fissile material mass, equipment) result from this analysis. These controls, either passive (physical), active (mechanical), or administrative (human), are implemented by inherently safe or fault-tolerant plant designs, or, if such designs are not practicable, by administrative controls such as operating procedures, job instructions and other means to minimize the potential for significant process changes that could lead to a nuclear criticality accident.

== Principles ==
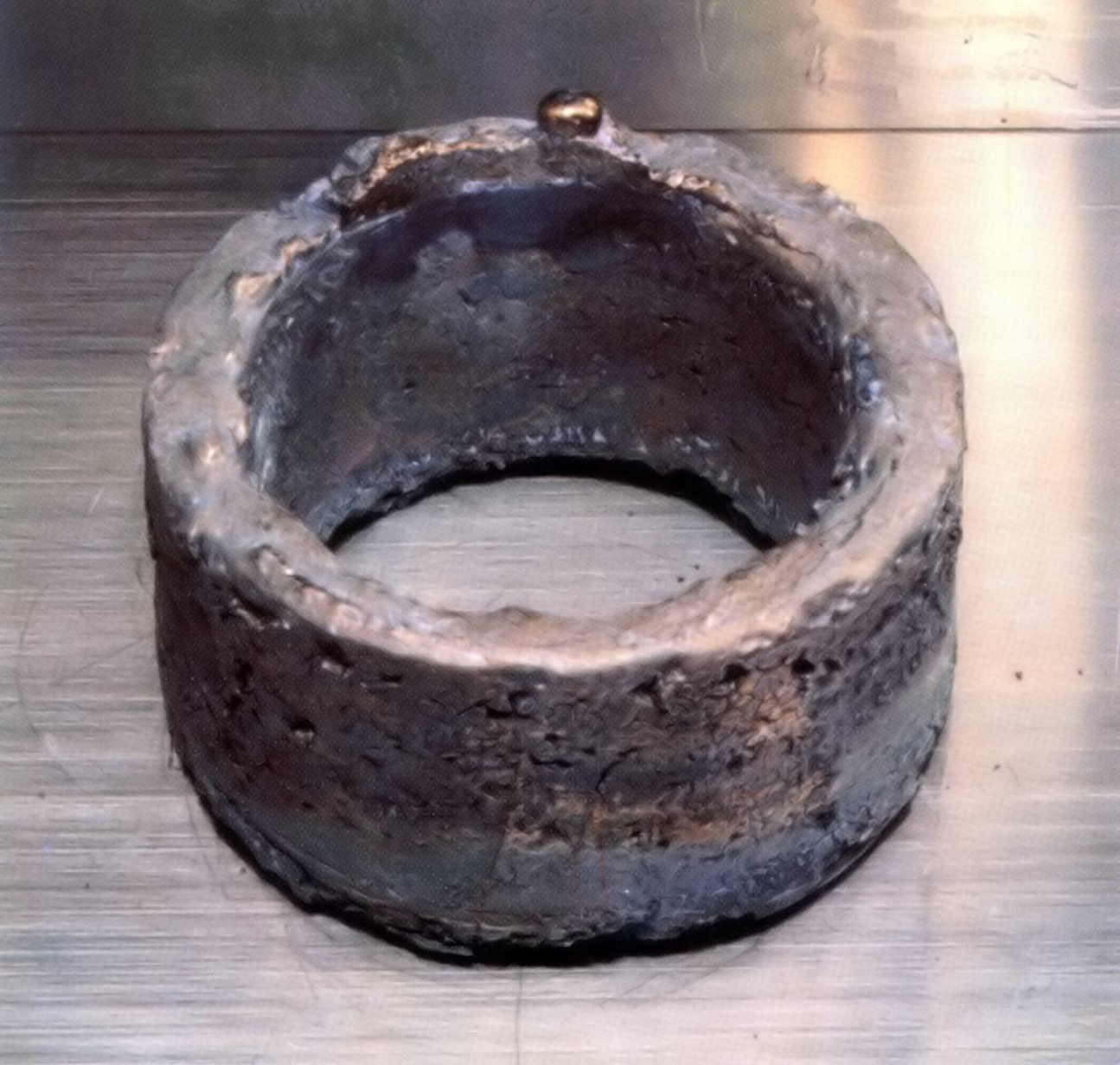
The hollow ring shape of this plutonium ingot favors neutron leakage and thus reduces the likelihood of criticality.

As a simplistic analysis, a system will be exactly critical if the rate of neutron production from fission is exactly balanced by the rate at which neutrons are either absorbed or lost from the system due to leakage. Safely subcritical systems can be designed by ensuring that the potential combined rate of absorption and leakage always exceeds the potential rate of neutron production.

The parameters affecting the criticality of the system may be remembered using the mnemonic MAGICMERV. Some these parameters are not independent from one another; for example, changing mass will result in a change of volume, among others.

Mass: The probability of fission increases as the total number of fissile nuclei increases. The relationship is not linear. If a fissile body has a given size and shape but varying density and mass, there is a threshold below which criticality cannot occur. This threshold is called the critical mass.

Absorption: Absorption removes neutrons from the system. Large amounts of absorbers are used to control or reduce the probability of a criticality. Good absorbers are boron, cadmium, gadolinium, silver, and indium.

Geometry/shape: The shape of the fissile system affects how easily neutrons can escape (leak out) from it, in which case they are not available to cause fission events in the fissile material. Therefore, the shape of the fissile material affects the probability of occurrence of fission events. A shape with a large surface area, such as a thin slab, favors leakage and is safer than the same amount of fissile material in a small, compact shape such as a cube or sphere.

Interaction of units: Neutrons leaking from one unit can enter another. Two units, which by themselves are sub-critical, could interact with each other to form a critical system. The distance separating the units and any material between them influences the effect.

Concentration/Density: Neutron reactions leading to scattering, capture or fission reactions are more likely to occur in dense materials; conversely, neutrons are more likely to escape (leak) from low density materials.

Moderation: Neutrons resulting from fission are typically fast (high energy). These fast neutrons do not cause fission as readily as slower (less energetic) ones. Neutrons are slowed down (moderated) by collision with atomic nuclei. The most effective moderating nuclei are hydrogen, deuterium, beryllium and carbon. Hence hydrogenous materials including oil, polyethylene, water, wood, paraffin, and the human body are good moderators. Note that moderation comes from collisions; therefore most moderators are also good reflectors.

Enrichment: The probability of a neutron reacting with a fissile nucleus is influenced by the relative numbers of fissile and non-fissile nuclei in a system. The process of increasing the relative number of fissile nuclei in a system is called enrichment. Typically, low enrichment means less likelihood of a criticality and high enrichment means a greater likelihood.

Reflection: When neutrons collide with other atomic particles (primarily nuclei) and are not absorbed, they are scattered (i.e. they change direction). If the change in direction is large enough, neutrons that have just escaped from a fissile body may be deflected back into it, increasing the likelihood of fission. This is called 'reflection'. Good reflectors include hydrogen, beryllium, carbon, lead, uranium, water, polyethylene, concrete, Tungsten carbide and steel.

Volume: For a body of fissile material in any given shape, increasing the size of the body increases the average distance that neutrons must travel before they can reach the surface and escape. Hence, increasing the size of the body increases the likelihood of fission and decreases the likelihood of leakage. Hence, for any given shape (and reflection conditions - see below) there will be a size that gives an exact balance between the rate of neutron production and the combined rate of absorption and leakage. This is the critical size.

Other parameters include:

Temperature: This particular parameter is less commonly considered by criticality safety practitioners, as variations in temperature in a typical operating environment are often minimal or unlikely to adversely affect the criticality of the system. Often, it is assumed the actual temperature of the system being analyzed is close to room temperature. Notable exceptions to this assumption include high-temperature reactors and low-temperature cryogenic experiments.

Heterogeneity: Blending fissile powders into solution, milling of powders or scraps, or other processes that affect the small-scale structure of fissile materials is important. While normally referred to as heterogeneity control, generally the concern is maintaining homogeneity because the homogeneous case is usually less reactive. Particularly, at lower enrichment, a system may be more reactive in a heterogeneous configuration compared to a homogeneous configuration.

Physicochemical Form: Consists of controlling the physical state (i.e., solid, liquid, or gas) and form (e.g., solution, powder, green or sintered pellets, or metal) and/or chemical composition (e.g., uranium hexafluoride, uranyl fluoride, plutonium nitrate, or mixed oxide) of a particular fissile material. The physicochemical form could indirectly affect other parameters, such as density, moderation, and neutron absorption.

== Calculations and analyses ==
To determine if any given system containing fissile material is safe, its neutron balance must be calculated. In all but very simple cases, this usually requires the use of computer programs to model the system geometry and its material properties.

The analyst describes the geometry of the system and the materials, usually with conservative or pessimistic assumptions. The density and size of any neutron absorbers is minimised while the amount of fissile material is maximised. As some moderators are also absorbers, the analyst must be careful when modelling these to be pessimistic. Computer codes allow analysts to describe a three-dimensional system with boundary conditions. These boundary conditions can represent real boundaries such as concrete walls or the surface of a pond, or can be used to represent an artificial infinite system using a periodic boundary condition. These are useful when representing a large system consisting of many repeated units.

Computer codes used for criticality safety analyses include OPENMC (MIT), COG (US), MONK (UK), SCALE/KENO (US), MCNP (US), and CRISTAL (France).

== Burnup credit ==
Traditional criticality analyses assume that the fissile material is in its most reactive condition, which is usually at maximum enrichment, with no irradiation. For spent nuclear fuel storage and transport, burnup credit may be used to allow fuel to be more closely packed, reducing space and allowing more fuel to be handled safely. In order to implement burnup credit, fuel is modeled as irradiated using pessimistic conditions which produce an isotopic composition representative of all irradiated fuel. Fuel irradiation produces actinides consisting of both neutron absorbers and fissionable isotopes as well as fission products which absorb neutrons.

In fuel storage pools using burnup credit, separate regions are designed for storage of fresh and irradiated fuel. In order to store fuel in the irradiated fuel store it must satisfy a loading curve which is dependent on initial enrichment and irradiation.

== See also ==
- Critical mass
- Criticality accident
- Nuclear and radiation accidents and incidents
- World Association of Nuclear Operators
