= Blue Ribbon Commission on America's Nuclear Future =

US commission on nuclear waste

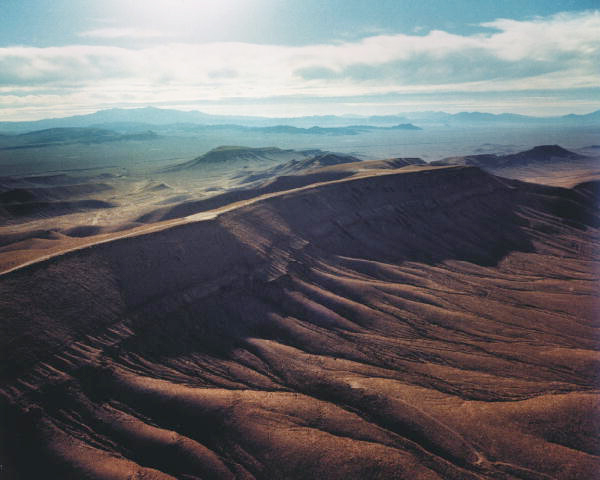
Yucca Mountain sits adjacent to the Nevada Test Site in Nye County, Nevada.

Schematic of a geologic repository under construction at Olkiluoto Nuclear Power Plant site, Finland

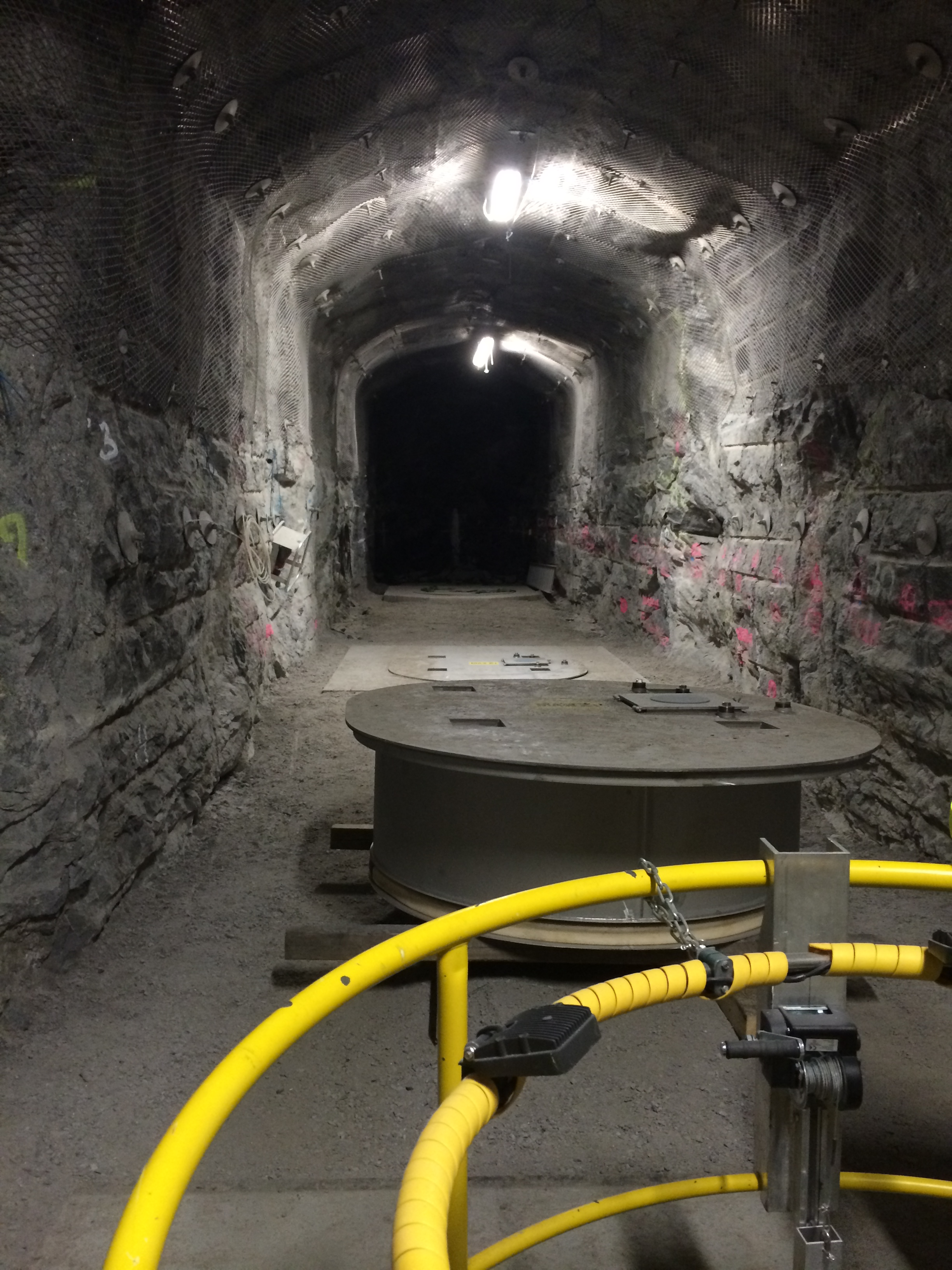
Demonstration tunnel of Onkalo in Olkiluoto

A Blue Ribbon Commission on America's Nuclear Future was appointed by US president Barack Obama to look into future options for existing and future nuclear waste, following the ending of work on the incomplete Yucca Mountain Repository. In 2012, there were 70 nuclear power plant sites where 65,000 short tons (59,000 metric tons) of spent fuel is stored in the US. Each year, more than 2,000 short tons (1,800 t) are added to this total. Nine US states have "explicit moratoria on new nuclear power until a storage solution emerges". A deep geological repository seems to be the favored approach to storing nuclear waste.

On January 26, 2012, the commission submitted its final report to US Energy Secretary Steven Chu. The Commission put forth seven recommendations for developing a comprehensive strategy to pursue. A major recommendation was that "the United States should undertake an integrated nuclear waste management program that leads to the timely development of one or more permanent deep geological facilities for the safe disposal of spent fuel and high-level nuclear waste".

== Background ==
In the United States, a blue-ribbon panel (or blue ribbon commission) is a group of exceptional people appointed to investigate or study or analyze a given issue. Blue-ribbon panels generally have a degree of independence from political influence or other authority, and such panels usually have no direct authority of their own. Their value comes from their ability to use their expertise to issue findings or recommendations which can then be used by those with decision-making power to act.

At present there are 70 nuclear power plant sites where 65,000 tons of spent fuel is stored in the USA. Each year, more than 2,000 tons are added to this total. US nuclear waste management policy completely broke down with the ending of work on the incomplete Yucca Mountain Repository. Without a long-term solution to store nuclear waste, a nuclear renaissance in the U.S. remains unlikely. Nine states have "explicit moratoria on new nuclear power until a storage solution emerges".

In a Presidential Memorandum dated January 29, 2010, President Obama established the Blue Ribbon Commission on America's Nuclear Future. The commission, composed of fifteen members, conducted an extensive two-year study of nuclear waste disposal, what is referred to as the "back end" of the nuclear energy process. The commission established three subcommittees: Reactor and Fuel Cycle Technology, Transportation and Storage, and Disposal.

During their research the Commission visited Finland, France, Japan, Russia, Sweden, and the UK, and in 2012, the Commission submitted its final report. The Commission did not issue recommendations for a specific site but rather presented a comprehensive recommendation for disposal strategies.

Some nuclear power advocates argue that the United States should develop factories and reactors that will recycle some spent fuel. However, the Obama administration has disallowed reprocessing of nuclear waste, citing nuclear proliferation concerns. The Blue Ribbon Commission said that "no existing technology was adequate for that purpose, given cost considerations and the risk of nuclear proliferation". A deep geological repository seems to be favored.

== Final report ==
On January 26, 2012, the Commission submitted its final report to Energy Secretary Steven Chu. In their final report the Commission put forth several recommendations for developing a comprehensive strategy to pursue. A major recommendation was that "the United States should undertake an integrated nuclear waste management program that leads to the timely development of one or more permanent deep geological facilities for the safe disposal of spent fuel and high-level nuclear waste". There is an "international consensus on the advisability of storing nuclear waste in deep underground repositories", but no country in the world has yet opened such a site.

In their final report the Commission put forth seven recommendations for developing a comprehensive strategy to pursue:

Recommendation #1
The United States should undertake an integrated nuclear waste management program that leads to the timely development of one or more permanent deep geological facilities for the safe disposal of spent fuel and high-level nuclear waste.

Recommendation #2
A new, single-purpose organization is needed to develop and implement a focused, integrated program for the transportation, storage, and disposal of nuclear waste in the United States.

Recommendation #3
Assured access to the balance in the Nuclear Waste Fund (NWF) and to the revenues generated by annual nuclear waste fee payments from utility ratepayers is essential and must be provided to the new nuclear waste management organization.

Recommendation #4
A new approach is needed to site and develop nuclear waste facilities in the United States in the future. We believe that these processes are most likely to succeed if they are:

- Adaptive—in the sense that process itself is flexible and produces decisions that are responsive to new information and new technical, social, or political developments.
- Staged—in the sense that key decisions are revisited and modified as necessary along the way rather than being pre-determined in advance.
- Consent-based—in the sense that affected communities have an opportunity to decide whether to accept facility siting decisions and retain significant local control.
- Transparent—in the sense that all stakeholders have an opportunity to understand key decisions and engage in the process in a meaningful way.
- Standards- and science-based—in the sense that the public can have confidence that all facilities meet rigorous, objective, and consistently-applied standards of safety and environmental protection.
- Governed by partnership arrangements or legally-enforceable agreements with host states, tribes and local communities.

Recommendation #5
The current division of regulatory responsibilities for long-term repository performance between the NRC and the EPA is appropriate and should continue. The two agencies should develop new, site-independent safety standards in a formally coordinated joint process that actively engages and solicits input from all the relevant constituencies.

Recommendation #6
The roles, responsibilities, and authorities of local, state, and tribal governments (with respect to facility siting and other aspects of nuclear waste disposal) must be an element of the negotiation between the federal government and the other affected units of government in establishing a disposal facility. In addition to legally-binding agreements, as discussed in Recommendation #4, all affected levels of government (local, state, tribal, etc.) must have, at a minimum, a meaningful consultative role in all other important decisions. Additionally, states and tribes should retain—or where appropriate, be delegated—direct authority over aspects of regulation, permitting, and operations where oversight below the federal level can be exercised effectively and in a way that is helpful in protecting the interests and gaining the confidence of affected communities and citizens.

Recommendation #7
The Nuclear Waste Technical Review Board (NWTRB) should be retained as a valuable source of independent technical advice and review.

== Membership ==
Co-chairmen of the Commission were Lee H. Hamilton and Brent Scowcroft, and members of the Commission included, Vicky Bailey, Albert Carnesale, Pete Domenici, Susan Eisenhower, Chuck Hagel, Jonathan Lash, Allison M. Macfarlane, Richard Meserve, Ernest Moniz, John Rowe, and Phil Sharp.

== See also ==
- List of nuclear waste treatment technologies
- Into Eternity, a 2010 documentary about the construction of a Finnish waste depository
- Nuclear safety in the United States
