= High-level radioactive waste management =

Management and disposal of highly radioactive materials

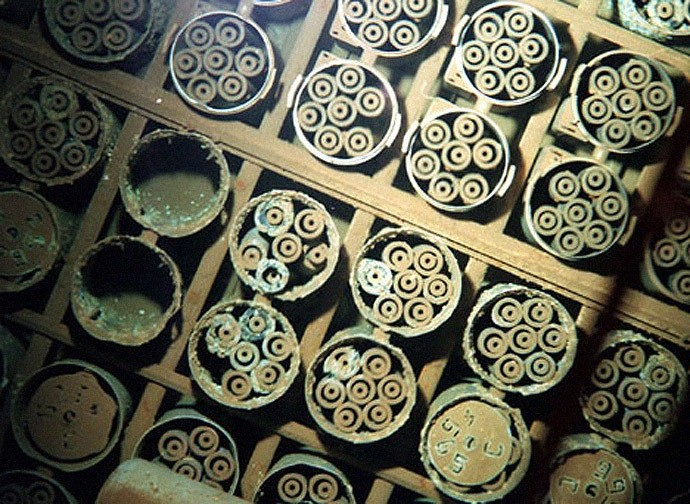
Spent nuclear fuel stored underwater and uncapped at the Hanford site in Washington, US

High-level radioactive waste management addresses the handling of high-level radioactive materials generated from nuclear power production and nuclear weapons manufacture. Radioactive waste contains both short-lived and long-lived radionuclides, as well as non-radioactive nuclides. In 2002, the United States stored approximately 47,000 tonnes of high-level radioactive waste.

Among the constituents of spent nuclear fuel, neptunium-237 and plutonium-239 are particularly problematic due to their long half-lives of two million years and 24,000 years, respectively. Handling high-level radioactive waste requires sophisticated treatment processes and long-term strategies such as permanent storage, disposal, or conversion into non-toxic forms to isolate it from the biosphere. Radioactive decay follows the half-life rule, which means that the intensity of radiation decreases over time as the rate of decay is inversely proportional to the duration of decay. In other words, the radiation from a long-lived isotope like iodine-129 will be much less intense than that of short-lived isotope like iodine-131.

Governments worldwide are exploring various disposal strategies, usually focusing on a deep geological repository, though progress in implementing these long-term solutions has been slow. This challenge is exacerbated by the timeframes required for safe decay, ranging from 10,000 to millions of years. Thus, physicist Hannes Alfvén identified the need for stable geological formations and human institutions that can endure for extended periods, noting the absence of any civilization or geological formation that has proven stable for such durations. Other scientists contest the requirement for millennia-stable human institutions, stressing that a waste depository can instead be made fail-safe with regards to groundwater intrusion and therefore eliminating the requirement for active maintenance. Indeed, the removal of the management burden from future generations, while ensuring as best as possible they are not exposed to significant radiological hazard, is a key principal behind intergenerational equity.

The management of radioactive waste not only involves technical and scientific considerations but also raises significant ethical concerns regarding the impacts on future generations. The debate over appropriate management strategies includes arguments for and against the reliance on geochemical simulation models and natural geological barriers to contain radionuclides post-repository closure.

Despite some scientists advocating for the feasibility of relinquishing control over radioactive materials to geohydrologic processes, skepticism remains due to the lack of empirical validation of these models over extensive time periods. Others insist on the necessity of deep geologic repositories in stable formations. Forecasts concerning the health impacts of long-term radioactive waste disposal are critically assessed, with practical studies typically considering only up to 100 years for planning and cost evaluation. Ongoing research continues to inform the long-term behavior of radioactive wastes, influencing management strategies and national policies globally.

== Deep geologic disposal ==
Schematic of a geologic repository under construction at Olkiluoto Nuclear Power Plant site, Finland

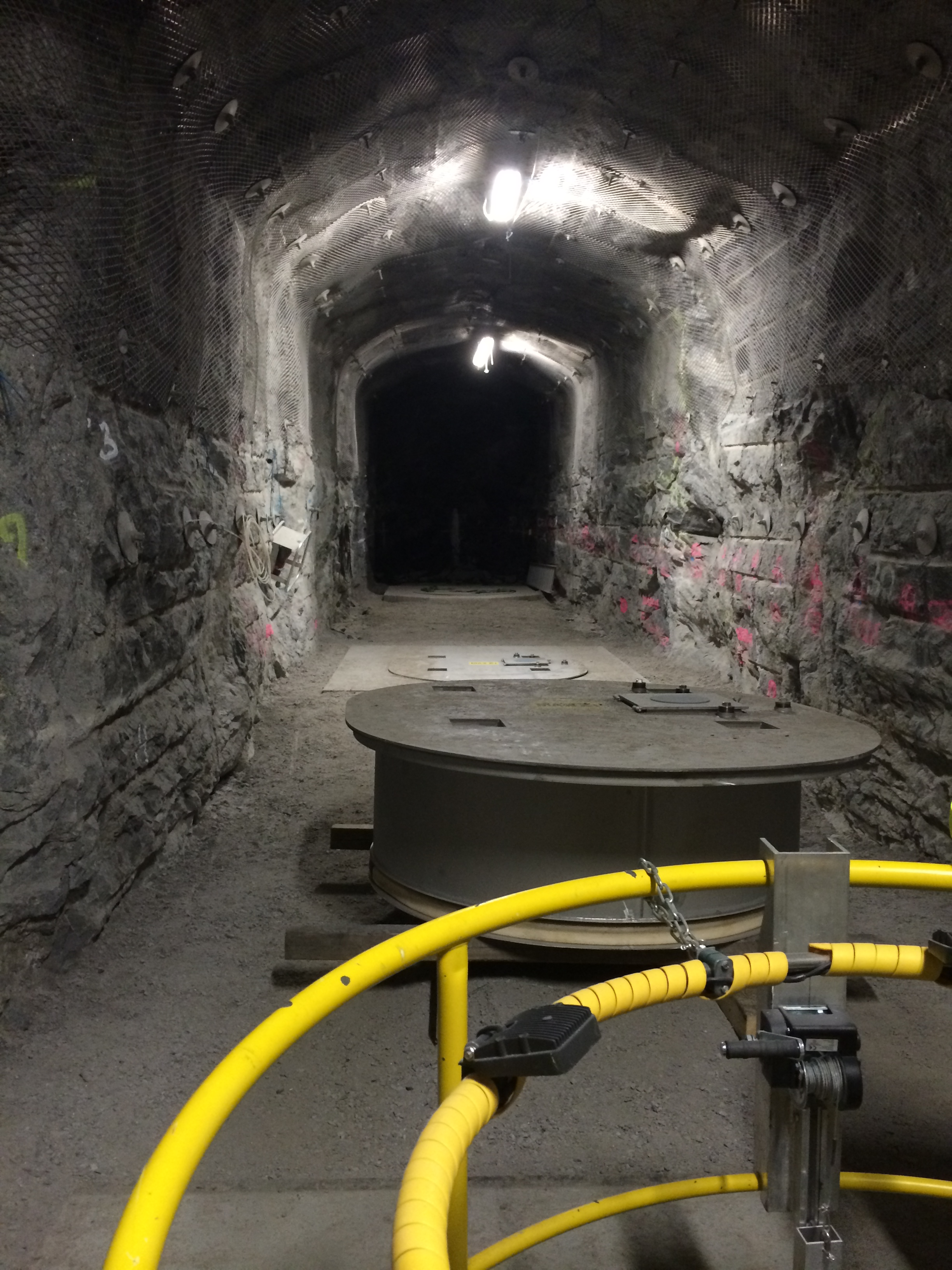
Demonstration tunnel in Olkiluoto

The selection process for permanent repositories for high-level radioactive waste and nuclear spent fuel is underway in several countries. The only purpose-built deep geological repository that is currently licensed for disposal of nuclear material is the Waste Isolation Pilot Plant (WIPP) in the USA, but it does not have a licence for disposal of used fuel or HLW. Plans for disposal of spent fuel are particularly well advanced in Finland, as well as Sweden, France, and the USA, though in the USA there have been political delays. In Canada and the UK, deep disposal has been selected and the site selection processes have commenced. The basic concept involves identifying a large, stable geological formation and using mining technology to excavate a deep tunnel or shaft using tunnel boring machines, between 500–1,000 metres (1,600–3,300 ft) below the surface, where rooms or vaults can be created for the disposal of radioactive waste. The aim is to isolate the waste permanently from the human environment. Concerns about immediate stewardship cessation of such disposal methods have been raised with suggestions that continuous management and monitoring would be preferable.

Given that certain radioactive isotopes have half-lives exceeding one million years, even minimal rates of container leakage and radionuclide migration must be taken into account. It is estimated that several half-lives may pass before some nuclear materials diminish in radioactivity to levels that are not harmful to living organisms. A 1983 review by the National Academy of Sciences endorsed the Swedish nuclear waste program’s estimate that isolation of waste might be necessary for up to one million years.

The land-based subductive waste disposal method proposes disposing of nuclear waste in a subduction zone accessible from land. This method is not restricted by international treaties and is recognized as a feasible and advanced technology for nuclear waste disposal.

At the natural nuclear fission site discovered at the Oklo mine in Gabon, where nuclear fission reactions occurred 1.7 billion years ago, fission products have moved less than three meters. This minimal movement is attributed possibly more to retention within the uraninite crystal structure than to actual insolubility or sorption by moving groundwater. The uraninite crystals at Oklo are better preserved than those in spent fuel rods, likely due to the incomplete nuclear reactions that make the reaction products less vulnerable to groundwater.

The horizontal drillhole disposal method involves drilling over one kilometer vertically and two kilometers horizontally into the earth’s crust to dispose of high-level waste forms such as spent nuclear fuel and specific isotopes like caesium-137 or strontium-90. Following placement and a period of retrievability, the drillholes would be sealed. In 2018 and again in 2019, a US-based private company conducted tests demonstrating the emplacement and retrieval of a test canister in a horizontal drillhole, though no actual high-level waste was used in these tests.

== Materials for geological disposal ==
In order to store the high level radioactive waste in long-term geological depositories, specific waste forms need to be used which will allow the radioactivity to decay away while the materials retain their integrity for thousands of years. The materials being used can be broken down into a few classes: glass waste forms, ceramic waste forms, and nanostructured materials.

The glass forms include borosilicate glasses and phosphate glasses. Borosilicate nuclear waste glasses are used on an industrial scale to immobilize high level radioactive waste in many countries which are producers of nuclear energy or have nuclear weaponry. The glass waste forms have the advantage of being able to accommodate a wide variety of waste-stream compositions, they are easy to scale up to industrial processing, and they are stable against thermal, radiative, and chemical perturbations. These glasses function by binding radioactive elements to nonradioactive glass-forming elements. Phosphate glasses while not being used industrially have much lower dissolution rates than borosilicate glasses, which make them a more favorable option. However, no single phosphate material has the ability to accommodate all of the radioactive products so phosphate storage requires more reprocessing to separate the waste into distinct fractions. Both glasses have to be processed at elevated temperatures making them unusable for some of the more volatile radiotoxic elements. Understanding the corrosion rates of nuclear glasses is of great importance during the planning of a deep geological repository.

Ceramic waste forms offer higher waste loadings than the glass options because ceramics have crystalline structures which can incorporate large amounts of specific radionuclides at specific lattice sites. Also, mineral analogues of the ceramic waste forms provide evidence for long term durability. Due to this fact and the fact that they can be processed at lower temperatures, ceramics are often considered the next generation in high level radioactive waste forms. The high waste loading of ceramic waste forms comes at the cost of lowered flexibility. Often specific ceramic waste forms must be designed for the immobilisation of specific radionuclides, due to the waste nuclide occupying a specific site in the crystal lattice which other radionuclides may not easily incorporate into.

== National management plans ==
Finland, the United States and Sweden are the most advanced in developing a deep repository for high-level radioactive waste disposal. Countries vary in their plans on disposing used fuel directly or after reprocessing, with France and Japan having an extensive commitment to reprocessing. The country-specific status of high-level waste management plans are described below.

In many European countries (e.g., Britain, Finland, the Netherlands, Sweden and Switzerland) the risk or dose limit for a member of the public exposed to radiation from a future high-level nuclear waste facility is considerably more stringent than that suggested by the International Commission on Radiation Protection or proposed in the United States. European limits are often more stringent than the standard suggested in 1990 by the International Commission on Radiation Protection by a factor of 20, and more stringent by a factor of ten than the standard proposed by the U.S. Environmental Protection Agency (EPA) for Yucca Mountain nuclear waste repository for the first 10,000 years after closure. Moreover, the U.S. EPA’s proposed standard for greater than 10,000 years is 250 times more permissive than the European limit.

The countries that have made the most progress towards a repository for high-level radioactive waste have typically started with public consultations and made voluntary siting a necessary condition. This consensus seeking approach is believed to have a greater chance of success than top-down modes of decision making, but the process is necessarily slow, and there is "inadequate experience around the world to know if it will succeed in all existing and aspiring nuclear nations".

Moreover, most communities do not want to host a nuclear waste repository as they are "concerned about their community becoming a de facto site for waste for thousands of years, the health and environmental consequences of an accident, and lower property values".

=== Asia ===
==== China ====
In China (People's Republic of China), ten reactors provide about 2% of electricity and five more are under construction. China made a commitment to reprocessing in the 1980s; a pilot plant is under construction at Lanzhou, where a temporary spent fuel storage facility has been constructed. Geological disposal has been studied since 1985, and a permanent deep geological repository was required by law in 2003. Sites in Gansu Province near the Gobi desert in northwestern China are under investigation, with a final site expected to be selected by 2020, and actual disposal by about 2050.

==== Taiwan ====
In Taiwan (Republic of China), nuclear waste storage facility was built at the Southern tip of Orchid Island in Taitung County, offshore of Taiwan Island. The facility was built in 1982 and it is owned and operated by Taipower. The facility receives nuclear waste from Taipower's current three nuclear power plants. However, due to the strong resistance from local community in the island, the nuclear waste has to be stored at the power plant facilities themselves.

==== India ====
India adopted a closed fuel cycle, which involves reprocessing and recycling of the spent fuel. The reprocessing results in 2-3% of the spent fuel going to waste while the rest is recycled. The waste fuel, called high level liquid waste, is converted to glass through vitrification. Vitrified waste is then stored for a period of 30–40 years for cooling.

Sixteen nuclear reactors produce about 3% of India’s electricity, and seven more are under construction. Spent fuel is processed at facilities in Trombay near Mumbai, at Tarapur on the west coast north of Mumbai, and at Kalpakkam on the southeast coast of India. Plutonium will be used in a fast breeder reactor (under construction) to produce more fuel, and other waste vitrified at Tarapur and Trombay. Interim storage for 30 years is expected, with eventual disposal in a deep geological repository in crystalline rock near Kalpakkam.

==== Japan ====
In 2000, a Specified Radioactive Waste Final Disposal Act called for creation of a new organization to manage high level radioactive waste, and later that year the Nuclear Waste Management Organization of Japan (NUMO) was established under the jurisdiction of the Ministry of Economy, Trade and Industry. NUMO is responsible for selecting a permanent deep geological repository site, construction, operation and closure of the facility for waste emplacement by 2040. Site selection began in 2002 and application information was sent to 3,239 municipalities, but by 2006, no local government had volunteered to host the facility. Kōchi Prefecture showed interest in 2007, but its mayor resigned due to local opposition. In December 2013 the government decided to identify suitable candidate areas before approaching municipalities.

The head of the Science Council of Japan’s expert panel has said Japan's seismic conditions makes it difficult to predict ground conditions over the necessary 100,000 years, so it will be impossible to convince the public of the safety of deep geological disposal.

=== Europe ===
==== Belgium ====
Belgium has seven nuclear reactors that provide about 52% of its electricity. Belgian spent nuclear fuel was initially sent for reprocessing in France. In 1993, reprocessing was suspended following a resolution of the Belgian parliament; spent fuel is since being stored on the sites of the nuclear power plants. The deep disposal of high-level radioactive waste (HLW) has been studied in Belgium for more than 30 years. Boom Clay is studied as a reference host formation for HLW disposal. The Hades underground research laboratory (URL) is located at −223 m (−732 ft) in the Boom Formation at the Mol site. The Belgian URL is operated by the Euridice Economic Interest Group, a joint organisation between SCK•CEN, the Belgian Nuclear Research Centre which initiated the research on waste disposal in Belgium in the 1970s and 1980s and ONDRAF/NIRAS, the Belgian agency for radioactive waste management. In Belgium, the regulatory body in charge of guidance and licensing approval is the Federal Agency of Nuclear Control, created in 2001.

==== Finland ====
In 1983, the government decided to select a site for permanent repository by 2010. With four nuclear reactors providing 29% of its electricity, Finland in 1987 enacted a Nuclear Energy Act making the producers of radioactive waste responsible for its disposal, subject to requirements of its Radiation and Nuclear Safety Authority and an absolute veto given to local governments in which a proposed repository would be located. Producers of nuclear waste organized the company Posiva, with responsibility for site selection, construction and operation of a permanent repository. A 1994 amendment to the Act required final disposal of spent fuel in Finland, prohibiting the import or export of radioactive waste.

Environmental assessment of four sites occurred in 1997–98, Posiva chose the Olkiluoto site near two existing reactors, and the local government approved it in 2000. The Finnish Parliament approved a deep geologic repository there in igneous bedrock at a depth of about 500 metres (1,600 ft) in 2001. The repository concept is similar to the Swedish model, with containers to be clad in copper and buried below the water table beginning in 2020. An underground characterization facility, Onkalo spent nuclear fuel repository, was constructed at the site from 2004 to 2017.

==== France ====
With 58 nuclear reactors contributing about 75% of its electricity, the highest percentage of any country, France has been reprocessing its spent reactor fuel since the introduction of nuclear power there. Some reprocessed plutonium is used to make fuel, but more is being produced than is being recycled as reactor fuel. France also reprocesses spent fuel for other countries, but the nuclear waste is returned to the country of origin. Radioactive waste from reprocessing French spent fuel is expected to be disposed of in a geological repository, pursuant to legislation enacted in 1991 that established a 15-year period for conducting radioactive waste management research. Under this legislation, partition and transmutation of long-lived elements, immobilization and conditioning processes, and long-term near surface storage are being investigated by the Commissariat à l’Energie Atomique (CEA). Disposal in deep geological formations is being studied by the French agency for radioactive waste management (Agence nationale pour la Gestion des Déchets radioactifs), in underground research labs.

Three sites were identified for possible deep geologic disposal in clay near the border of Meuse and Haute-Marne, near Gard, and at Vienne. In 1998 the government approved the Meuse/Haute Marne Underground Research Laboratory, a site near Meuse/Haute-Marne and dropped the others from further consideration. Legislation was proposed in 2006 to license a repository by 2020, with operations expected in 2035.

==== Germany ====
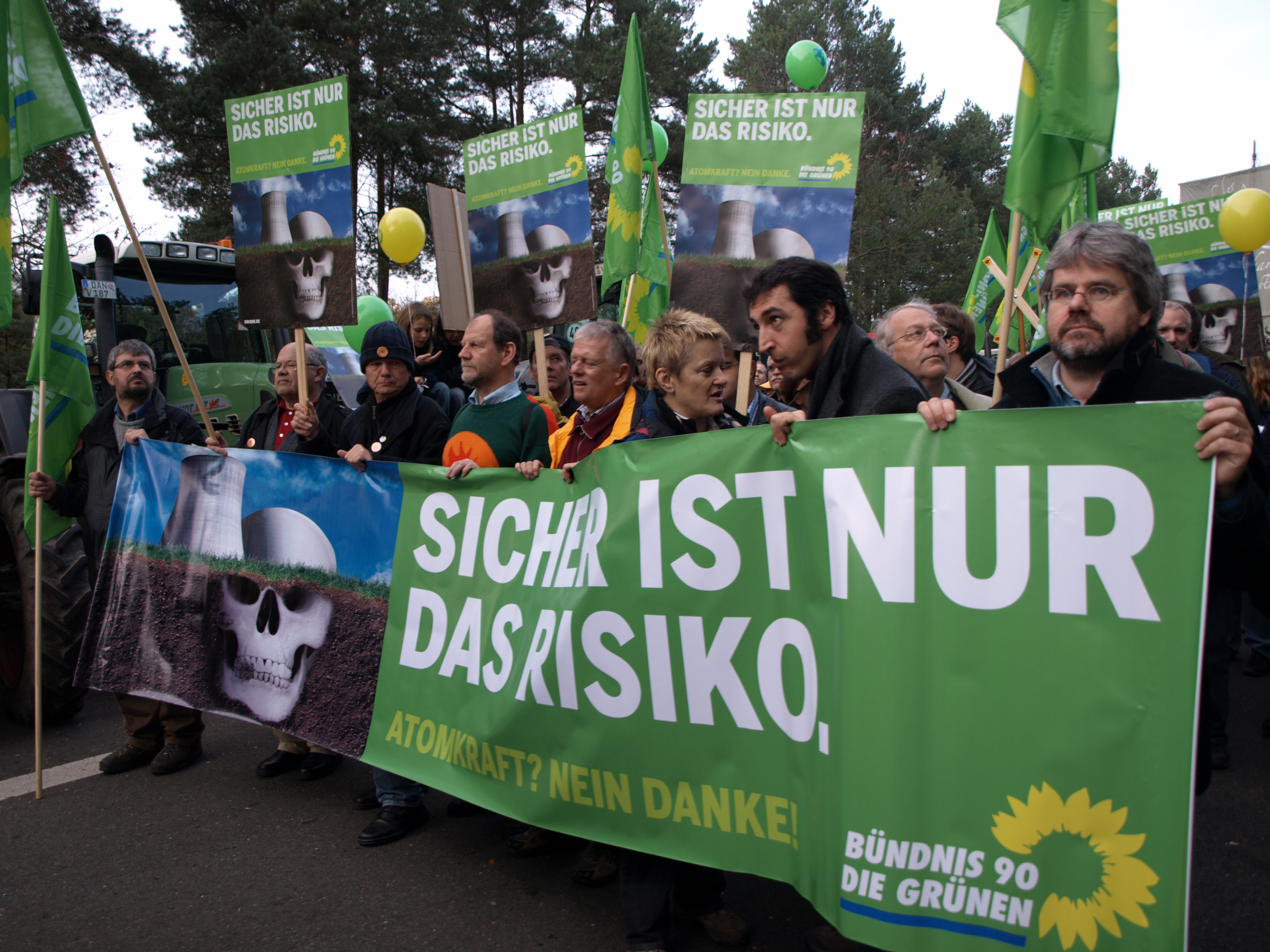
Anti-nuclear protest near nuclear waste disposal centre at Gorleben in northern Germany

Nuclear waste policy in Germany is in flux. German planning for a permanent geologic repository began in 1974, focused on salt dome Gorleben, a salt mine near Gorleben about 100 kilometres (62 mi) northeast of Braunschweig. The site was announced in 1977 with plans for a reprocessing plant, spent fuel management, and permanent disposal facilities at a single site. Plans for the reprocessing plant were dropped in 1979. In 2000, the federal government and utilities agreed to suspend underground investigations for three to ten years, and the government committed to ending its use of nuclear power, closing one reactor in 2003.

Within days of the March 2011 Fukushima Daiichi nuclear disaster, Chancellor Angela Merkel "imposed a three-month moratorium on previously announced extensions for Germany's existing nuclear power plants, while shutting seven of the 17 reactors that had been operating since 1981". Protests continued and, on 29 May 2011, Merkel's government announced that it would close all of its nuclear power plants by 2022.

Meanwhile, electric utilities have been transporting spent fuel to interim storage facilities at Gorleben, Lubmin and Ahaus until temporary storage facilities can be built near reactor sites. Previously, spent fuel was sent to France or the United Kingdom for reprocessing, but this practice was ended in July 2005.

==== Netherlands ====
COVRA (Centrale Organisatie Voor Radioactief Afval) is the Dutch interim nuclear waste processing and storage company in Vlissingen, which stores the waste produced in their only remaining nuclear power plant after it is reprocessed by Areva NC in La Hague, Manche, Normandy, France. Until the Dutch government decides what to do with the waste, it will stay at COVRA, which currently has a license to operate for one hundred years. As of early 2017, there are no plans for a permanent disposal facility.

==== Russia ====
In Russia, the Ministry of Atomic Energy (Minatom) is responsible for 31 nuclear reactors which generate about 16% of its electricity. Minatom is also responsible for reprocessing and radioactive waste disposal, including over 25,000 tonnes (55 million pounds) of spent nuclear fuel in temporary storage in 2001.

Russia has a long history of reprocessing spent fuel for military purposes, and previously planned to reprocess imported spent fuel, possibly including some of the 33,000 tonnes (73 million pounds) of spent fuel accumulated at sites in other countries who received fuel from the U.S., which the U.S. originally pledged to take back, such as Brazil, the Czech Republic, India, Japan, Mexico, Slovenia, South Korea, Switzerland, Taiwan, and the European Union.

An Environmental Protection Act in 1991 prohibited importing radioactive material for long-term storage or burial in Russia, but controversial legislation to allow imports for permanent storage was passed by the Russian Parliament and signed by President Putin in 2001. In the long term, the Russian plan is for deep geologic disposal. Most attention has been paid to locations where waste has accumulated in temporary storage at Mayak, near Chelyabinsk in the Ural Mountains, and in granite at Krasnoyarsk in Siberia.

==== Spain ====
Spain has five active nuclear plants with seven reactors which produced 21% of the country's electricity in 2013. Furthermore, there is legacy high-level waste from another two older, closed plants. Between 2004 and 2011, a bipartisan initiative of the Spanish Government promoted the construction of an interim centralized storage facility (ATC, Almacén Temporal Centralizado), similar to the Dutch COVRA concept. In late 2011 and early 2012 the final green light was given, preliminary studies were being completed and land was purchased near Villar de Cañas (Cuenca) after a competitive tender process. The facility would be initially licensed for 60 years.

However, soon before groundbreaking was slated to begin in 2015, the project was stopped because of a mix of geological, technical, political and ecological problems. By late 2015, the Regional Government considered it "obsolete" and effectively "paralyzed." As of early 2017, the project has not been shelved but it stays frozen and no further action is expected anytime soon. Meanwhile, the spent nuclear fuel and other high-level waste is being kept in the plants' pools, as well as on-site dry cask storage (almacenes temporales individualizados) in Garoña and Trillo.

As of early 2017, there are no plans for a permanent high-level disposal facility either. Low- and medium-level waste is stored in the El Cabril facility (Province of Cordoba.)

==== Sweden ====
In Sweden, as of 2007 there are ten operating nuclear reactors that produce about 45% of its electricity. Two other reactors in Barsebäck were shut down in 1999 and 2005. When these reactors were built, it was expected their nuclear fuel would be reprocessed in a foreign country, and the reprocessing waste would not be returned to Sweden. Later, construction of a domestic reprocessing plant was contemplated, but has not been built.

Passage of the Stipulation Act of 1977 transferred responsibility for nuclear waste management from the government to the nuclear industry, requiring reactor operators to present an acceptable plan for waste management with "absolute safety" in order to obtain an operating license. In early 1980, after the Three Mile Island meltdown in the United States, a referendum was held on the future use of nuclear power in Sweden. In late 1980, after a three-question referendum produced mixed results, the Swedish Parliament decided to phase out existing reactors by 2010. On 5 February 2009, the Government of Sweden announced an agreement allowing for the replacement of existing reactors, effectively ending the phase-out policy. In 2010, the Swedish government opened up for construction of new nuclear reactors. The new units can only be built at the existing nuclear power sites, Oskarshamn, Ringhals or Forsmark, and only to replace one of the existing reactors, that will have to be shut down for the new one to be able to start up.

The Swedish Nuclear Fuel and Waste Management Company. (Svensk Kärnbränslehantering AB, known as SKB) was created in 1980 and is responsible for final disposal of nuclear waste there. This includes operation of a monitored retrievable storage facility, the Central Interim Storage Facility for Spent Nuclear Fuel at Oskarshamn, about 240 kilometres (150 mi) south of Stockholm on the Baltic coast; transportation of spent fuel; and construction of a permanent repository. Swedish utilities store spent fuel at the reactor site for one year before transporting it to the facility at Oskarshamn, where it will be stored in excavated caverns filled with water for about 30 years before removal to a permanent repository.

Conceptual design of a permanent repository was determined by 1983, calling for placement of copper-clad iron canisters in granite bedrock about 500 metres (1,600 ft) underground, below the water table in what is known as the KBS-3 method. Space around the canisters will be filled with bentonite clay. After examining six possible locations for a permanent repository, three were nominated for further investigation, at Osthammar, Oskarshamn, and Tierp. On 3 June 2009, Swedish Nuclear Fuel and Waste Co. chose a location for a deep-level waste site at Östhammar, near Forsmark Nuclear Power plant. The application to build the repository was handed in by SKB 2011, and was approved by the Swedish Government on 27 January 2022.

==== Switzerland ====
Switzerland has five nuclear reactors that provide about 43% of its electricity around 2007 (34% in 2015). Some Swiss spent nuclear fuel has been sent for reprocessing in France and the United Kingdom; most fuel is being stored without reprocessing. An industry-owned organization, ZWILAG, built and operates a central interim storage facility for spent nuclear fuel and high-level radioactive waste, and for conditioning low-level radioactive waste and for incinerating wastes. Other interim storage facilities predating ZWILAG continue to operate in Switzerland.

The Swiss program is considering options for the siting of a deep repository for high-level radioactive waste disposal, and for low and intermediate level wastes. Construction of a repository is not foreseen until well into this century. Research on sedimentary rock (especially Opalinus Clay) is carried out at the Swiss Mont Terri rock laboratory; the Grimsel Test Site, an older facility in crystalline rock is also still active.

==== United Kingdom ====
In 2007 the United Kingdom has 19 operating reactors, producing about 20% of its electricity. It processes much of its spent fuel at Sellafield on the northwest coast across from Ireland, where nuclear waste is vitrified and sealed in stainless steel canisters for dry storage above ground for at least 50 years before eventual deep geologic disposal. Sellafield has a history of environmental and safety problems, including a fire in a nuclear plant in Windscale, and a significant incident in 2005 at the main reprocessing plant (THORP).

In 1982 the Nuclear Industry Radioactive Waste Management Executive (NIREX) was established with responsibility for disposing of long-lived nuclear waste and in 2006 a Committee on Radioactive Waste Management (CoRWM) of the Department of Environment, Food and Rural Affairs recommended geologic disposal 200–1,000 metres (660–3,280 ft) underground. NIREX developed a generic repository concept based on the Swedish model but has not yet selected a site. A Nuclear Decommissioning Authority is responsible for packaging waste from reprocessing and will eventually relieve British Nuclear Fuels Ltd. of responsibility for power reactors and the Sellafield reprocessing plant.

=== North America ===
==== Canada ====
The 18 operating nuclear power plants in Canada generated about 16% of its electricity in 2006. A national Nuclear Fuel Waste Act was enacted by the Canadian Parliament in 2002, requiring nuclear energy corporations to create a waste management organization to propose to the Government of Canada approaches for management of nuclear waste, and implementation of an approach subsequently selected by the government. The Act defined management as "long term management by means of storage or disposal, including handling, treatment, conditioning or transport for the purpose of storage or disposal."

The resulting Nuclear Waste Management Organization (NWMO) conducted an extensive three-year study and consultation with Canadians. In 2005, they recommended Adaptive Phased Management, an approach that emphasized both technical and management methods. The technical method included centralized isolation and containment of spent nuclear fuel in a deep geologic repository in a suitable rock formation, such as the granite of the Canadian Shield or Ordovician sedimentary rocks. Also recommended was a phased decision-making process supported by a program of continuous learning, research and development.

In 2007, the Canadian government accepted this recommendation, and NWMO was tasked with implementing the recommendation. No specific timeframe was defined for the process. In 2009, the NWMO was designing the process for site selection; siting was expected to take 10 years or more. Site selection between the two potential host communities (Ingace, Ontario / South Bruce, Ontario) is expected to be complete by Fall 2024

==== United States ====
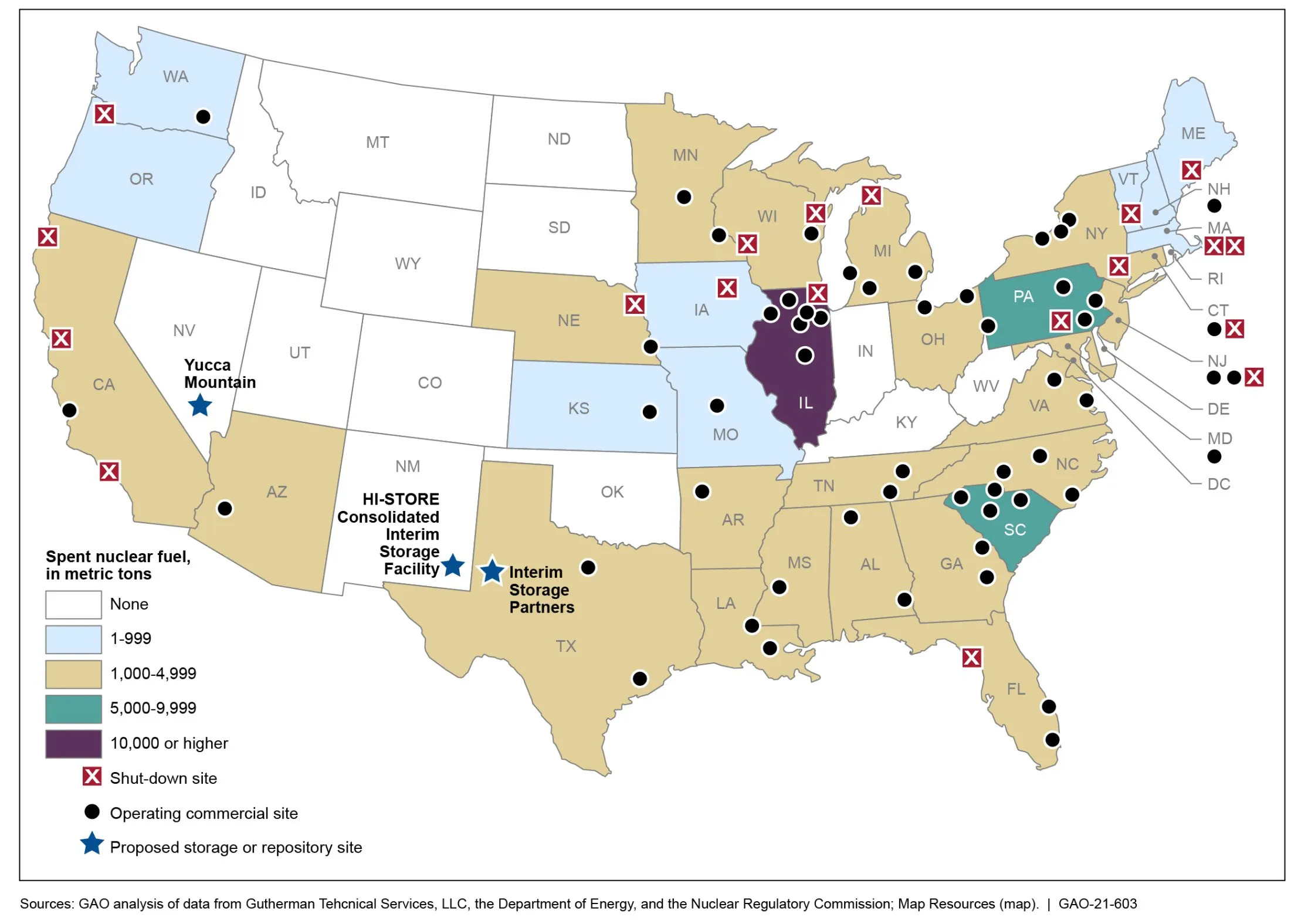
The locations across the U.S. where nuclear waste is stored

The Nuclear Waste Policy Act of 1982 established a timetable and procedure for constructing a permanent, underground repository for high-level radioactive waste by the mid-1990s, and provided for some temporary storage of waste, including spent fuel from 104 civilian nuclear reactors that produce about 19.4% of electricity there. The United States in April 2008 had about 56,000 tonnes (120 million pounds) of spent fuel and 20,000 canisters of solid defense-related waste, and this is expected to increase to 119,000 tonnes (260 million pounds) by 2035. The U.S. opted for Yucca Mountain nuclear waste repository, a final repository at Yucca Mountain in Nevada, but this project was widely opposed, with some of the main concerns being long-distance transportation of waste from across the United States to this site, the possibility of accidents, and the uncertainty of success in isolating nuclear waste from the human environment in perpetuity. Yucca Mountain, with capacity for 70,000 tonnes (150 million pounds) of radioactive waste, was expected to open in 2017. However, the Obama Administration rejected use of the site in the 2009 United States Federal Budget proposal, which eliminated all funding except that needed to answer inquiries from the Nuclear Regulatory Commission, "while the Administration devises a new strategy toward nuclear waste disposal." On March 5, 2009, Energy Secretary Steven Chu told a Senate hearing "the Yucca Mountain site no longer was viewed as an option for storing reactor waste." Starting in 1999, military-generated nuclear waste is being entombed at the Waste Isolation Pilot Plant in New Mexico.

Since the fraction of a radioisotope's atoms decaying per unit of time is inversely proportional to its half-life, the relative radioactivity of a quantity of buried human radioactive waste would diminish over time compared to natural radioisotopes; such as the decay chains of 120 million megatonnes (260 quadrillion pounds) of thorium and 40 million megatonnes (88 quadrillion pounds) of uranium which are at relatively trace concentrations of parts per million each over the crust's 30,000 quadrillion tonnes (66,000,000 quadrillion pounds) mass. For instance, over a timeframe of thousands of years, after the most active short half-life radioisotopes decayed, burying U.S. nuclear waste would increase the radioactivity in the top 610 metres (2,000 ft) of rock and soil in the United States (10 million square kilometres, 3.9 million square miles) by ≈ 1 part in 10 million over the cumulative amount of natural radioisotopes in such a volume, although the vicinity of the site would have a far higher concentration of artificial radioisotopes underground than such an average.

In a Presidential Memorandum dated January 29, 2010, President Obama established the Blue Ribbon Commission on America’s Nuclear Future (the commission). The commission, composed of fifteen members, conducted an extensive two-year study of nuclear waste disposal, what is referred to as the "back end" of the nuclear energy process. The commission established three subcommittees: Reactor and Fuel Cycle Technology, Transportation and Storage, and Disposal. On January 26, 2012, the Commission submitted its final report to Energy Secretary Steven Chu. In the Disposal Subcommittee’s final report, the Commission does not issue recommendations for a specific site but rather presents a comprehensive recommendation for disposal strategies. During their research, the Commission visited Finland, France, Japan, Russia, Sweden, and the UK. In their final report, the Commission put forth seven recommendations for developing a comprehensive strategy to pursue. The Biden administration recommended the categorization of waste by level of radioactivity rather than the source of the waste, enabling new management plans.

=== International repository ===
Although Australia does not have any nuclear power reactors, Pangea Resources considered siting an international repository in the outback of South Australia or Western Australia in 1998, but this stimulated legislative opposition in both states and the Australian national Senate during the following year. Thereafter, Pangea ceased operations in Australia but reemerged as Pangea International Association, and in 2002 evolved into the Association for Regional and International Underground Storage with support from Belgium, Bulgaria, Hungary, Japan and Switzerland. A general concept for an international repository has been advanced by one of the principals in all three ventures. Russia has expressed interest in serving as a repository for other countries, but does not envision sponsorship or control by an international body or group of other countries. South Africa, Argentina and western China have also been mentioned as possible locations.

In the EU, COVRA is negotiating a European-wide waste disposal system with single disposal sites that can be used by several EU-countries. This EU-wide storage possibility is being researched under the SAPIERR-2 program.

== See also ==
- Horizontal Drillhole
- Deep Geological Repository
- Deep Borehole
- Decommissioning of Russian nuclear-powered vessels
- Economics of new nuclear power plants
- Into Eternity, a 2010 documentary about the construction of a Finnish waste depository
- Journey to the Safest Place on Earth, a 2013 documentary about the urgent need for safe depositories
- List of nuclear waste treatment technologies
- Nuclear reprocessing
- Radioactive waste
