= Glass disease =

Degradation process of glass

Roman glass vase with a weathered surface showing discoloration, cracking and flaking

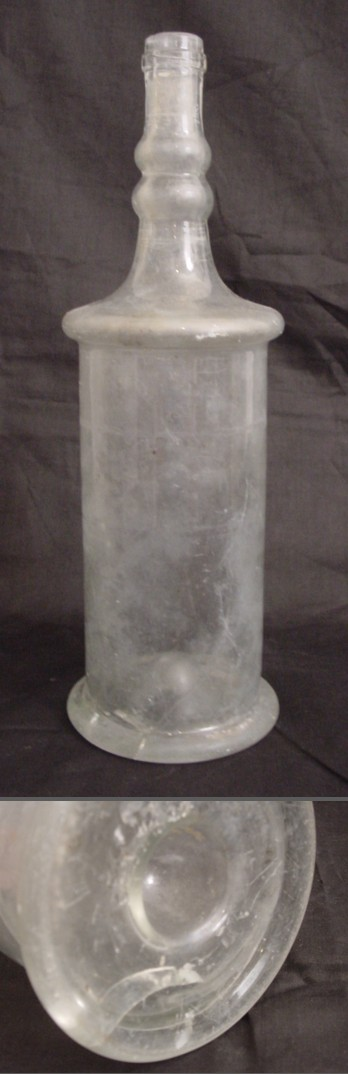
Bottle with glass disease

Glass disease, also referred to as sick glass or glass illness, is a degradation process of glass that can result in weeping, crizzling, spalling, cracking and fragmentation. Glass disease is caused by an inherent instability in the chemical composition of the original glass formula. Properties of a particular glass will vary with the type and proportions of silica, alkalis and alkaline earths in its composition. Once damage has occurred it is irreversible, but decay processes can be slowed by climate control to regulate surrounding temperature, humidity, and air flow.

== Chemical composition and decay ==
Glass disease is caused by an inherent fault in the chemical composition of the original glass formula. Glass contains three types of components: network formers establish basic structure, network stabilizers make glass strong and water resistant, and network modifiers, also known as flux, lower the melting point at which the glass can be formed. Common formulations of glass may include silica (SiO_{2}) as a former, alkali oxides such as soda (Na_{2}O) or potash (K_{2}O) for flux, and alkaline earth oxides such as lime (CaO) for stabilizing.

Structurally, silicate glasses are composed of a network of SiO_{4}-tetrahedrons. In addition to the network former silicon which establishes its principal structure, glass contains network modifying agents such as the alkali ions Na^{+} and K^{+} and the alkali earth ions Ca^{2+} and Mg^{2+}. Glass does not have a defined stoichiometry, rather the network is flexible. It can incorporate other ions, depending upon factors such as the main composition and firing conditions of the glass. This causes almost all glass to be chemically unstable to some extent, but maintain their physical and chemical properties over usable timescales due to a phenomenon known as metastability.

Electron charge differences of ions within the structure form the basis of its bonding. Both viscosity and transition temperature are related to the availability of oxygen bonds in the glass's composition. Modifying agents tend to lower the melting point of the silica. Higher contents of SiO_{2} increase acidity of the glass. Higher contents of CaO, Na_{2}O, and K_{2}O increase basicity. The chemical stability of glass decreases when only Na_{2}O and K_{2}O are added as flux, because bonding becomes weaker. The chemical stability of glass can be increased by adding CaO, MgO, ZnO, and Al_{2}O_{3}. To be stable, glass composition must balance temperature lowering agents with stabilizing agents.

Exposure of a glass surface to moisture, either in solution or from humidity in the atmosphere, causes chemical reactions to occur on and below the surface of the glass. The exchange of alkali metal ions (from within the glass) and hydrogen ions (from outside) can cause chemical and structural changes to the glass. When alkali metal cations in the near-surface layer are replaced by smaller hydrogen ions, structural differences between the affected surface layer and the unaffected lower layers of glass cause increasing tensile stress, which in turn can cause cracking.

The likelihood of degradation due to glass disease depends on the amount and proportion of alkaline compounds mixed with silica, and on surrounding conditions. Inadequate calcium oxide causes the alkalis in the glass to remain water-soluble at a low level of humidity. Exposure to higher levels of relative humidity during storage or display causes alkali to hydrate and leach out of the glass. Repeated changes in humidity can be particularly damaging. Any glass object can deteriorate if it is exposed to unsuitable environmental conditions. Crystal, historic glass, or treasured family items should never be exposed to the high temperatures and water pressure of a dishwasher.

== Stages of deterioration ==
The processes involved in glass disease can reduce the transparency of the glass or even threaten the integrity of the structure. Glass disease causes a complex disintegration of the glass which can be identified through a variety of symptoms, including weeping, crizzling, spalling, cracking and fragmentation.

=== Example ===
The following description of glass beads from an object in the collection of the British Museum, effectively illustrates the range of symptoms that can occur with glass disease:

"Two factors indicated that the deterioration was the result of the phenomenon commonly referred to as ‘glass disease’; first, damage was limited to beads of one particular colour (pale yellow) and second, visible signs of all the various stages of glass disease were present on these beads. This included the presence of small white crystals on the surface of most pale yellow beads and a fine network of uniform cracks or ‘crizzling’ crossing the surface of 55 of the 69 beads. This crizzling appeared to be more prevalent around the bead holes. A total of 32 beads had areas of spalling, or advanced crizzling, where cracks had extended further into the glass structure... Many had areas that had already spalled and the fragments lost. Vertical cracks extending through the glass were present on 37 beads and four beads had become detached due to complete fragmentation."

=== Stage One ===
The initial stage of glass disease occurs when moisture causes alkali to be leached out of the glass. This becomes apparent when hygroscopic alkali deposits on the glass give it a cloudy or hazy appearance. This may occur within as little as five to 10 years of the glass's manufacturing. The glass may feel slippery or slimy and tiny droplets, or weeping, may be seen in high humidity (above 55%). The hydrated alkali can form fine crystals on the surface of the glass in low relative humidity (below 40%).

At this stage, it may be possible to gently wash the glass and remove the surface alkali. This will help to stabilize the glass by reducing the surface pH, and by removing dust, soiling, and hygroscopic components that attract further moisture.

=== Stage Two ===
If alkali builds up due to ion exchange, and remains on the surface of the glass, the decay process will accelerate. The presence of sodium or potassium ions in the alkali build up will increase the pH on the surface of the glass, causing it to become basic. This will dissolve silica from the glass as well as releasing more alkali ions.

The haziness seen on the glass may not disappear entirely when washed and dried. When examined closely at an angle with a low light, fine cracks like tiny silvery lines or shimmering rays, may be visible. A microscope can confirm the presence of cracks. The cracks are caused by the loss of alkali, which leaves microscopic gaps in the structure of the glass.

=== Stage Three ===
As higher amounts of alkali leach from the glass cracks are likely to become deeper. Crizzling is a distinctive network of fine cracks in the glass which is visible to the naked eye. In some cases, the crazing can gain a more uniform appearance. However, crizzling may not be uniform due to the creation of micro-climates on the glass.

=== Stage Four ===
Distinct cracks may appear on the surface of the glass, and surface material may flake or chip, a process referred to as spalling.

=== Stage Five ===
In the most severe stage of deterioration, the structural integrity of the glass has been lost and the glass may separate into pieces.

== Scientific Study ==
Energy dispersive x-ray analysis (EDXA), scanning electron microscopy (SEM) and secondary ion mass spectrometry (SIMS) can be used to study exchange reactions in different types of glass. By quantifying and studying chemical structure and reactions at the near-surface layer, the mechanisms of glass disease can be better understood. Measurement of the pH of glass surfaces is particularly important if glass objects have a matte surface, or have been exposed to kaolin or other substances. In the case of extremely small objects such as glass beads, pH measurement may be necessary to determine whether alkaline salts are present and changes in the glass are occurring.

The study of glass corrosion is of major interest in the field of radioactive waste management due to the usage of borosilicate glasses for the long-term disposal of high-level radioactive waste. To this end, specific glass compositions have been developed purely for the study of nuclear waste glass corrosion, such as the International Simple Glass (ISG).

== Prevalence ==
A survey of glass objects at the Victoria and Albert Museum in London, in 1992, found that more than 1 in 10 objects in the collection were affected by crizzling, ranging from 16th century Venetian to 20th century Scandinavian glass. Venetian glass is particularly susceptible because artisans minimized the use of lime, to make the glass as clear as possible. The works of modern glassmakers who experiment with their glass formulas, such as Ettore Sottsass, can also be at high risk for damage.

Museums such as the National Museum of the American Indian may find glass disease an issue of great importance because many of the Native American cultural materials in their collections incorporate glass beads. Small ornamental glass beads were often made cheaply, using recipes with a high flux to silica ratio. This makes them more susceptible to glass disease. Blues, reds, and black are often affected by glass disease. The combination of glass beads with other materials (cordage, fabric, leather, metal, bone, surface colorants, ceremonial substances, and kaolin) complicates deterioration and conservation of ethnographic objects.

== Conservation ==
In the earliest stage of glass disease, it may be possible to wash the glass to remove the surface alkali. The Corning Museum of Glass recommends washing with tap water (tepid, not hot) and a mild (non-ionic) conservation detergent. This should be followed by rinsing with de-ionized or distilled water, and careful drying to remove moisture. Careful washing can remove surface deposits, restore the appearance of clearness to the glass, and help to slow further deterioration. Ethanol has also been suggested for cleaning, particularly for glass beads, depending on the surrounding materials that may be affected.

Once more serious damage has occurred, it cannot be reversed. Climate control of humidity and temperature is a possible intervention. Because crizzling results from the reaction of components of the glass with water vapour, controlling humidity and temperature can slow its occurrence. At the Corning Museum of Glass, items in the collection are kept at stable levels of relative humidity, between 40 and 55 percent. Fans may be used within a case to encourage the movement of air and minimize adsorption of moisture on the glass surface. Deterioration is more likely to occur in areas with restricted air-flow which allow moisture to remain on the glass. Chemical methods for retarding corrosion rates and stabilizing surfaces are being investigated.

When a composite object contains a variety of materials, one of which is sick glass, the considerations involved in conserving and displaying the object become more complicated. For example, the British Museum chose to conserve and display a Siberian shamanic apron made of leather, glass and other materials. They weighed the likelihood that it would decay more quickly if shown against the desirability of making a unique object visible and the inevitability of its eventual degradation. "Its conservation and display ensures that access to this beautiful and unique object is maximized before the pale yellow beads, which are intrinsic to the object, are inevitably lost beyond repair."
