= International Simple Glass =

Standard material for corrosion experiments

The International Simple Glass (ISG) is a standardised 6-oxide alkali aluminoborosilicate glass composition for simulating vitrified high-level radioactive waste (HLW). It is an inactive simulant glass, meaning it bears a strong compositional similarity to active vitrified waste but without the radiological hazard and therefore greatly simplifies and expands the range of laboratory testing available. The ISG was designed to enable researchers from different countries with different compositions of vitrified HLW to compare the effects of different physical, chemical, and radiological conditions on the properties of a single glass, as many physical and chemical properties of glasses are strongly compositionally dependent. Different countries use different compositions for their HLW simulant glasses, with the widespread adoption of the ISG allowing researchers to systematically compare glass behaviour. The ISG was principally developed for the understanding of glass corrosion, as corrosion in a deep geological repository, leading to the release of radionuclides into groundwaters, is a major threat to the safety case of any such repository. There are technically two ISG's, ISG-1 and ISG-2, which differ only in that ISG-2 replaces half of the calcium oxide (CaO) in ISG-1 (by molar abundance) with magnesium oxide (MgO).

Composition
Oxide	ISG-1 (Mol %)	ISG-2 (Mol %)
SiO_{2}	60.2	60.2
B_{2}O_{3}	16.0	16.0
Na_{2}O	12.6	12.6
Al_{2}O_{3}	3.8	3.8
CaO	5.7	2.9
MgO	-	2.9
ZrO_{2}	1.7	1.7

== Development ==
ISG-1, at the time referred to merely as ISG, was developed in 2011 as part of an international initiative to improve collaboration in glass corrosion science. Its composition was formulated to have similar corrosion behaviour to many pre-existing simulant nuclear glasses, whilst being restricted to 6 oxides to enable atomistic computer simulations. The molar ratios of the oxides in the ISG were selected to match those of the French standard simulant glass, SON68, the inactive equivalent to the R7T7 vitrified nuclear waste. This was due to a combination of SON68's widespread use in the glass corrosion literature and that the composition that would end up as ISG-1 was already undergoing a 14 year long durability test at the time. To enable the global scientific community to have access to a homogeneous glass, a 50kg batch of ISG-1 was produced in ingots of 500g each by MoSci (Rolla, Missouri, United States) in May 2012.

== ISG-2 ==
In 2019, the growing depletion of the original 50kg stock of ISG-1 was noted by an international consortium of five countries, who unanimously voted for the production of more standard glass. This glass was produced by Corning Incorporated as part of a commitment to furthering scientific knowledge on long-term glass durability. This consortium also determined that more useful and novel information could be gathered by producing an additional glass of different composition, although the desire to leverage the collected knowledge of ISG-1's properties over the previous 7 years meant that the consortium also agreed that the new ISG-2 should be very similar in composition to ISG-1. The substitution of magnesium for calcium was chosen as the point of difference as magnesium bearing glasses, such as the UK's magnox waste, show different long-term corrosion behaviour owing to the formation of abundant magnesium smectite minerals.

== See also ==
- High-level radioactive waste management
- Glass
