= Into Eternity (film) =

- Directed by: Michael Madsen
- Written by: Michael Madsen
- Produced by: Lise Lense-Møller
- Starring: Carl Reinhold Bråkenhjelm, Mikael Jensen, Berit Lundqvist
- Cinematography: Heikki Färm
- Edited by: Daniel Dencik, Stefan Sundlöf
- Distributed by: Films Transit International
- Release date: 6 January 2010
- Running time: 75 minutes
- Country: Denmark
- Language: English

Into Eternity is a 2010 Danish documentary film directed by Michael Madsen, released in 2010. It follows the construction of the Onkalo waste repository at the Olkiluoto Nuclear Power Plant on the island of Olkiluoto, Finland. Director Michael Madsen questions Onkalo's intended eternal existence, addressing an audience in the remote future.

Into Eternity raises the question of the authorities' responsibility of ensuring compliance with relatively new safety criteria legislation and the principles at the core of nuclear waste management.

When shown on the British More4 digital television channel on 26 April 2011, the name Nuclear Eternity was used. It received a special mention in the Sheffield Green Award at Sheffield Doc/Fest in 2010.

== Background ==
Into Eternity is a documentary about a deep geological repository for nuclear waste. The concept of long-term underground storage for radioactive waste has been explored since the 1950s. The inner part of the Russian doll-like storage canisters is to be composed of copper. Hence in the case of Onkalo it is tightly linked to experiments on copper corrosion in running groundwater flow.

Application for the implementation of spent nuclear fuel repository was submitted by Posiva in 2001. The excavation itself started in 2004. With a total of four operable reactors providing 25% of the country's energy supply, Finland ranks 16th in the world nuclear power reactors country list topped by the United States (104 reactors) and France (58 reactors).

== Synopsis ==
This film explores the question of preparing the site so that it is not disturbed for 100,000 years, even though no structure in human history has stayed standing for such a long period.

Every day, the world over, large amounts of high-level radioactive waste created by nuclear power plants are placed in interim storage, which is vulnerable to natural disasters, man-made disasters, and societal changes. In Finland, the world’s first permanent repository is being hewn out of solid rock – a huge system of tunnels – that must last the entire period the waste remains hazardous: 100,000 years.

Once the repository waste has been deposited and is full, the facility is to be sealed off and never opened again. Or so we hope, but can we ensure that? And how is it possible to warn our descendants of the deadly waste we left behind? How do we prevent them from thinking they have found the Giza pyramids of our time, mystical burial grounds, hidden treasures? Which languages and signs will they understand? And if they understand, will they respect our instructions?

Experts above ground strive to find solutions to this crucially important radioactive waste issue to secure mankind and all species on planet Earth now and in the near and very distant future.

== Reception ==
The film received overall positive reviews from Swedish film critics, with an average score of 3.6 of 5 according to Kritiker.se. Praise was given for the suggestive presentation of the daunting task of communicating the dangers of nuclear waste far into the future, as well as the great dangers of handling the by-products of nuclear energy. At the same time, the same presentation was criticized by Dagens Nyheter for "numbing" the viewer by being exaggerated or even over-simplified. Cornell University anthropologist Vincent Ialenti has described differences between Madsen's film's "aesthetics of desolation and bleakness, of forbidding machinery and industrial processes" and his own fieldwork experiences in Olkiluoto repository safety case experts' offices. The film received the Green Screen Documentary Award at the International Documentary Film Festival Amsterdam (IDFA).

== See also ==
- List of films about nuclear issues
- Long-term nuclear waste warning messages
