= Beishan Underground Research Laboratory =

Radioactive waste repository in Gansu, China

The Beishan Underground Research Laboratory (also shortened Beishan URL) is a deep geological repository for the disposal of spent nuclear fuel, currently under construction in the Gobi Desert, in Gansu, China. The facility is expected to take 7 years to build, with a planned operating period of 50 years, and cost approximately 2.7 billion yuan (US$400 million). It will reach 560 m (1,840 ft) below ground at its deepest point.

== See also ==
- Radioactive waste
- Deep geological repository
- Nuclear power in China
