= Richard Meserve =

American physicist and lawyer

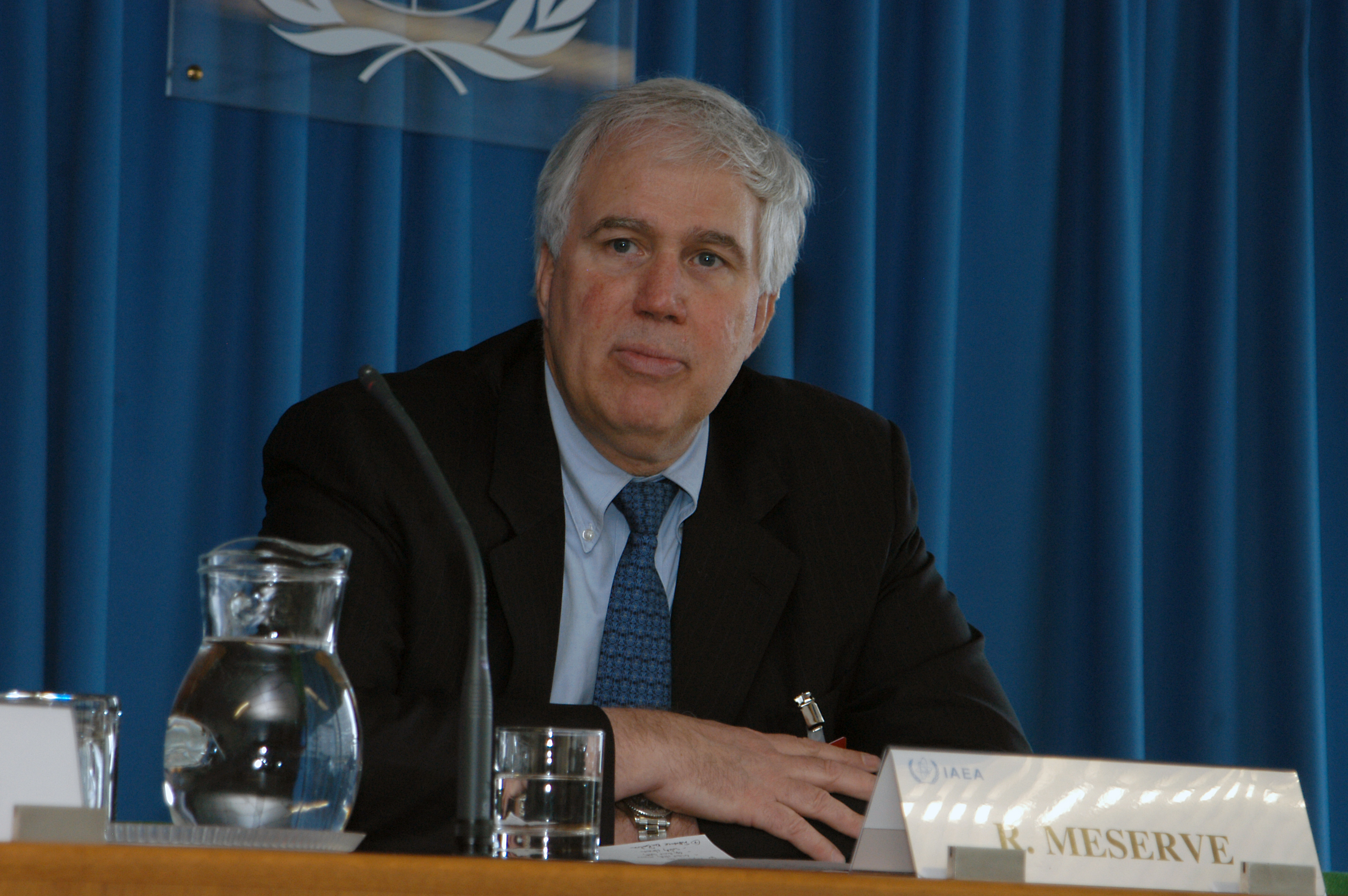
- Awards: Joseph A. Burton Forum Award (2023); AAAS Philip Hauge Abelson Prize (2008)

Richard Andrew "Dick" Meserve (born November 20, 1944, in Medford, Massachusetts) is an American lawyer and scientist. He served as Chairman of the Nuclear Regulatory Commission from 1999 to 2003 and served as President of the Carnegie Institution for Science from 2003 to 2014.

== Early life and education ==
Meserve received his undergraduate degree from Tufts University in 1966 He then began pursuing his doctorate in physics at Stanford University. While doing his graduate research, he decided to attend law school as well, and entered Harvard Law School, where he received a J.D. in 1975. He received a Ph.D. in applied physics from Stanford in 1976, after completing his dissertation.

== Initial legal career ==
After graduating from law school, Meserve served as a law clerk to Justice Benjamin Kaplan of the Massachusetts Supreme Judicial Court during 1975-76 and Justice Harry Blackmun of the Supreme Court of the United States during its 1976-77 term. After his clerkships, he became legal counsel to Frank Press, science and technology advisor of President Jimmy Carter, from 1977 to 1981. During that tenure, Meserve led the staff-level response at the White House to the 1979 Three Mile Island accident.

Meserve began practicing law at Covington & Burling in Washington, D.C., in 1981 as an associate; he became a partner of that firm in 1984. Much of his work in private practice involved legal issues with connections to science or scientific institutions. He also served on a variety of committees of the National Academies of Sciences, Engineering, and Medicine. After the 1986 Chernobyl disaster, Meserve chaired a panel convened by the National Academy of Sciences to assess the safety of nuclear reactors operated by the Department of Energy at the Savannah River Site to create nuclear weapons materials.

== Nuclear Regulatory Commission ==
In August 1999, President Bill Clinton nominated Meserve to become Chairman of the Nuclear Regulatory Commission (NRC) and was confirmed by the United States Senate in October 1999. He continued as NRC Chairman after the 2001 inauguration of President George W. Bush.

== Carnegie Institution for Science and after ==
In 2003, Meserve became the ninth President of the Carnegie Institution for Science. He also resumed the practice of law on a part-time basis in 2004 with Covington & Burling.

since 2003, he has served as U.S. representative and Chairman of the International Nuclear Safety Group of the International Atomic Energy Agency. In 2010, United States Secretary of Energy Steven Chu appointed Meserve to the federal government’s Blue Ribbon Commission on America's Nuclear Future. In 2016, Meserve received the Order of the Rising Sun, Gold and Silver Star, from the Government of Japan, for his role advising that government in its response to the 2011 Fukushima Daiichi nuclear disaster.He became President Emeritus of the Carnegie Institution for Science in 2014.

He is a member of the American Philosophical Society and the National Academy of Engineering and a fellow of the American Academy of Arts and Sciences, the American Association for the Advancement of Science, and the American Physical Society.

== Personal Life ==
Meserve married Martha "Marty" Meserve (Richards) on September 20, 1966, and they have two daughters: Amy Meserve (b. Nov. 1966) and her husband, Jeffrey "Jeff" Bergstrom, and Lauren Meserve (b. June 1971), and three granddaughters: Sophie (b. Oct. 2001), Sydney (b. Dec 2003), and Sylvie Bergstrom (b. Apr. 2008). Meserve has a history of making political donations to Democratic candidates and committees.
