= KBS-3 =

Swedish radioactive waste disposal system

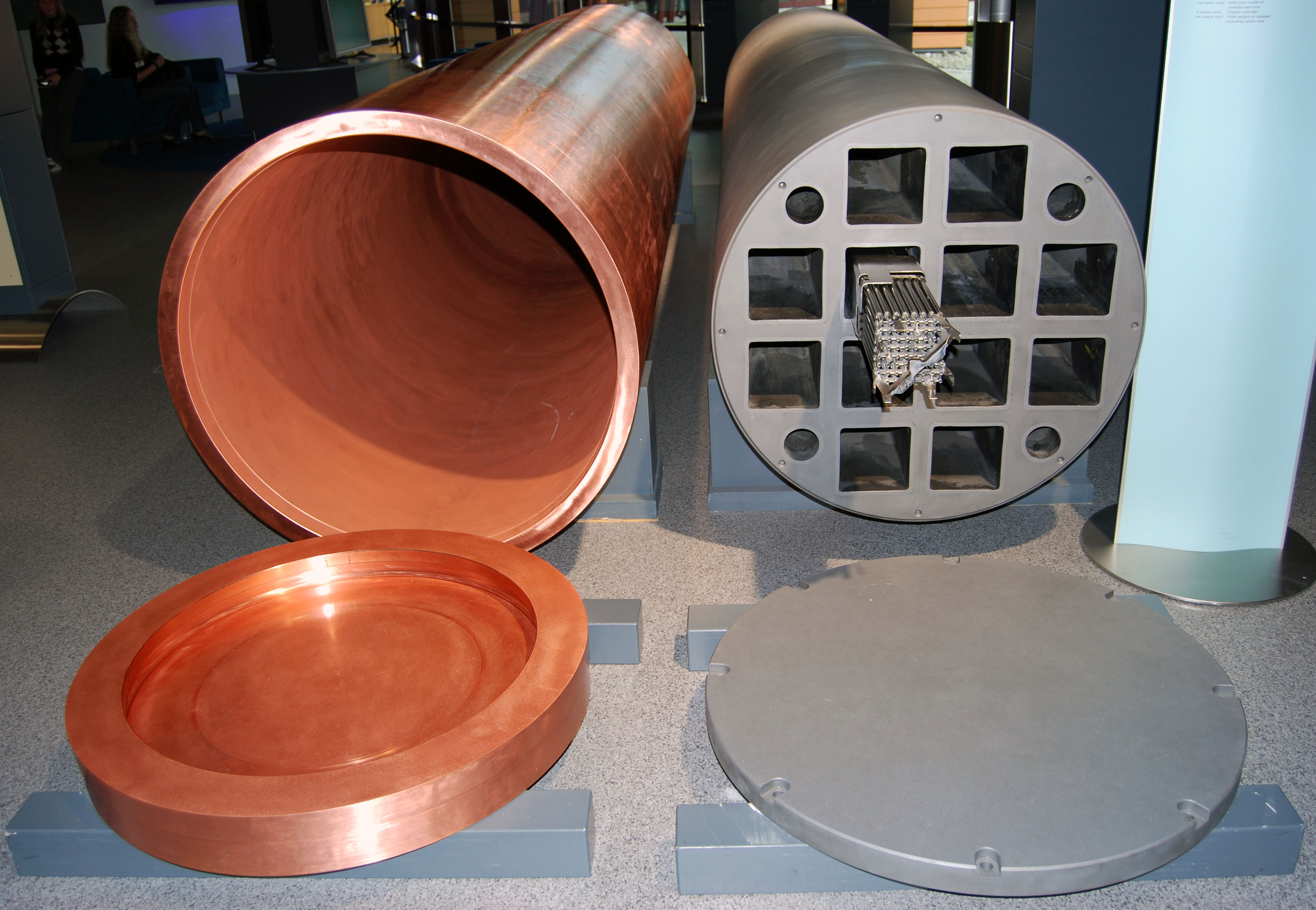
The capsule (Swedish version).

KBS-3 (an abbreviation of kärnbränslesäkerhet, nuclear fuel safety) is a technology for disposal of high-level radioactive waste developed in Sweden by Svensk Kärnbränslehantering AB (SKB) by appointment from Statens Strålskyddsinstitut (the government's radiation protection agency). The technology was developed by studying different natural storage facilities such as the natural reactor in Oklo, Gabon and the uranium mine in Cigar Lake, Saskatchewan, Canada. The general theory is that radioactive rock in these sites has been present for thousands of years, and has not affected the health and well-being of human populations. KBS-3 is also to be used in Finland at the Onkalo spent nuclear fuel repository, being built by Posiva.

The disposal method consists of the following steps:

- The waste is first stored in intermediate storage for 30 years.
- The waste is encapsulated in cast iron canisters.
- The cast iron canisters are encapsulated in copper (CuOFP alloy) capsules.
- The capsules are deposited in a layer of bentonite clay, in a circular hole, eight meters deep and with a diameter of two meters, drilled in a tunnel 500 metres down into crystalline rock.
- After the storage facility is full, the drill hole is sealed and the site marked.

If the holes into the rock from the tunnel are drilled vertically, the method is called KBS-3V and if they are drilled horizontally it is called KBS-3H. The only method considered so far is KBS-3V.

The overall theory is that radioactive rock has always been present in the earth, and it is generally harmless to human populations. Further, Cigar Lake and Oklo have proven that actinides do not easily migrate via ground water or other means. Spent fuel consists of radioactive ceramic, cooled until its short-half-life radioactives have decayed, so its heat-production is negligible. When initially made, the ceramic fuel is also wrapped in sealed tubes of corrosion-resistant zirconium alloy. Therefore, spent fuel is not water-soluble in any conventional sense, and is mechanically sturdy. The other elements present (crystalline bedrock, corrosion-resistant copper cylinders, etc.) have been scientifically proven to reduce the exposure to ground water, and the rate at which it can penetrate to the fuel and dissolve it. Further, if correctly sited, any leakage will enter seawater, providing a safe dilution until decay. Geological stability against earthquakes and other extreme events can be further increased by careful site selection. These safety factors multiply, extending the containment lifetime until most radioactive elements in the fuel have decayed, and only the longest-lived, least-radioactive isotopes remain. At this point, the contents of the repository are at least as safe as natural deposits of uranium. The process has been extensively studied and depends on well-understood chemistry and geology.

The risk of waste disposal is difficult to measure due to the necessity of gathering data over thousands of years. However, by employing process knowledge and risk management methodology, the risk associated with KBS-3 repositories have been thoroughly investigated in the assessments of long-term safety performed by SKB and Posiva.

== Facilities ==
The first facilities using this method will be located in Östhammar, Sweden, next to the Forsmark Nuclear Power Plant, and in Eurajoki, Finland, at the Onkalo spent nuclear fuel repository next to the Olkiluoto Nuclear Power Plant. In 2019, Posiva Ltd. announced that the construction of the spent nuclear fuel handling facility for Onkalo and installation of the requisite equipment in the Onkalo tunnels will begin. The contract was awarded to Skanska, and the expected date of completion will be in summer 2022. The operation of the facility will begin in the 2020s.

The Östhammar facility will have space for 6,000 capsules and the plan is to deposit 200 capsules into storage annually.

== Criticism ==
In 2012, a research group at the Royal Institute of Technology in Stockholm, Sweden, published research that suggests that the copper capsules of KBS-3 are not as corrosion-proof as SKB and Posiva claim.

In response, STUK (the Finnish nuclear safety office) asked Posiva for further explanation. Posiva dismissed the independent research in Sweden and Finland, referring to its own safety studies. SKB undertook follow-up studies, which indicated that the corrosion process does not exist, and that the initial experiments were not correctly executed and/or the wrong conclusions were drawn.

== See also ==
- Deep geological repository
- Spent nuclear fuel
