= Vincent Ialenti =

American anthropologist

- Born: Gardner, Massachusetts, U.S.
- Education: BA from Binghamton University; MSc from London School of Economics; PhD from Cornell University
- Occupation: Anthropologist
- Employer(s): Office of Nuclear Energy, United States Department of Energy
- Notable work: Deep Time Reckoning: How Future Thinking Can Help Earth Now (2020)

Vincent Ialenti is an American anthropologist and former U.S. Department of Energy official who studies how nuclear energy and weapons waste institutions engage with deep time.

During the Biden Administration, Ialenti led the U.S. DOE's Consent-Based Siting Consortia: twelve project teams - drawn from academia, nonprofits, the private sector, and beyond - awarded $24m to advance public understanding of spent nuclear fuel management. He is the author of Deep Time Reckoning, an anthropological exploration of how experts assessed the impact of Finland's Onkalo spent nuclear fuel repository on future ecosystems and civilizations.

Prior to his federal service, Ialenti was a MacArthur Assistant Research Professor at George Washington University's Elliott School of International Affairs and held fellowships at the University of Southern California, the University of British Columbia, The Berggruen Institute, and Cornell University's Society for the Humanities. He is currently a Senior Research Fellow at Tampere University in Finland.

== Biography ==
From 2022-2024, Ialenti hosted the U.S. Department of Energy's Office of Nuclear Energy's quarterly webinar series on participatory governance, community engagement, and sociopolitical innovations for solving America's nuclear waste stalemate.

Ialenti holds a MSc in "Law, Anthropology, and Society" from the London School of Economics and a PhD in Sociocultural Anthropology from Cornell University. In 2017, he became the first anthropologist with a feature article in Physics Today, the flagship publication of the American Institute of Physics.

From 2017 to 2019, Ialenti conducted a field study exploring the political, economic, and organizational drivers behind transuranic nuclear weapons waste "drum breach" accidents at Idaho National Laboratory and the Waste Isolation Pilot Plant. He developed this study in collaboration with geologist Allison Macfarlane, the former Chair of the U.S. Nuclear Regulatory Commission.

MIT Press and Penguin Random House published Ialenti's book, Deep Time Reckoning, in 2020. The book examined Finnish nuclear waste company Posiva's initiative to model far future societies, bodies, and ecosystems—and how their efforts were enabled by the Finnish populace's high levels of trust in geotechnical engineers, regulators, and ministry experts.

Ialenti's second book, Longstorming: Beyond the Age of Haste, is an anthropological exploration of how different temporal countercultures—from master clockmakers to nuclear energy technologists, wilderness trail crews, and Indigenous knowledge-keepers—exercise planetary imagination and interpretive patience beyond digital immediacy.

In 2021, Ialenti became the first anthropologist with an article published in the American Nuclear Society's technical journal Nuclear Technology. Later that year, Ialenti was featured alongside ambient musician Brian Eno in a Headspace meditation app podcast about long-term thinking.

== Personal life ==
Ialenti is married to conservationist Allegra Wrocklage.

Ialenti is an Associate of the Long Now Foundation in San Francisco, California.

== Books ==
- Ialenti, Vincent (2027). Longstorming: Beyond the Age of Haste. Cambridge, Massachusetts: MIT Press. ISBN 9780262057585.
- Ialenti, Vincent (2020). Deep Time Reckoning: How Future Thinking Can Help Earth Now. Cambridge, Massachusetts: MIT Press. ISBN 9780262539265.
