= Corrosion of vitrified high-level waste =

Glass corrosion in the field of vitrified high-level waste is the physical and chemical degradation (corrosion) of radioactive waste glasses during their long-term geological disposal. The processes involved are related to the more widely studied glass disease, as studied in an archaeological or museum curation context, but differ in specifics due to the unique and unusual glass compositions and chemical environments of corrosion. Most vitrified high-level waste is made up of alkali borosilicate glass, with some usage of alkali phosphate glasses, and the corrosion environment is controlled by groundwater composition, local radiation fields, and the presence of third-party materials such as steel canisters and clay backfills. The corrosion of nuclear glasses directly controls the release of radionuclides into the groundwaters of a deep geological repository, and therefore is of great concern to environmental regulators that control the permitting of deep geological repositories.

== Corrosion stages ==
Corrosion of nuclear glasses in aqueous solutions is considered to take place over three main stages, referred to as the initial rate stage, the residual rate stage, and the rate resumption stage. The "rate" of each stage refers to the rate of mass loss in terms of the mass of pristine glass that has been transformed into aqueous (dissolution) and solid (corrosion) species as a function of time. This is usually calculated from the concentration of boron in solution, as boron does not interact with surface alteration products and therefore proves to be a reliable alteration tracer. Determining the rate of corrosion is strongly influenced by the surface area of the glass sample used during the corrosion test.

=== Initial rate stage (Stage I) ===
The initial rate stage, also known as Stage I, takes place when glass corrosion happens far from chemical equilibrium and the solution is nearly perfectly dilute. Corrosion at this stage is dominated by the exchange of H^{+}/H_{3}O^{+} ions for alkali (mostly Na^{+} or Li^{+}) and the hydrolysis of the glass borosilicate network by OH^{-} ions. The rate of corrosion at stage I is the highest of any point throughout the corrosion process

=== Residual rate stage (Stage II) ===
Continued dissolution of the silicate network results in the accumulation of silica in solution, which prompts the development of a silica gel layer at the surface of the glass, consisting of hydrated silica where the Si - O - Si bonds of the original glass have been replaced by Si - O - H bonds. The exact mechanism behind the development of this layer is disputed with some authors suggesting that the in-situ recondensation of the hydrolysed network is responsible, whereas others suggest that the gel layer forms as a result of dissolution and reprecipitation of the silica coupled to the glass surface. During the residual rate stage the corrosion rate is multiple orders of magnitude lower than the initial rate, as the silica gel layer acts to passivate the glass against further corrosion.

=== Rate resumption stage (Stage III) ===
Rate resumption is a stage which is not always observed, whereby the alteration rate increases from that of stage II back to rates similar to the initial rate. This is related to the precipitation of silicate minerals from the solution, usually smectites and zeolites.

== Corrosion testing ==
Different types of corrosion test methods have been developed in order to empirically determine the rate of corrosion for different glasses in different solutions. As corrosion rate varies as a function of glass composition, the International Simple Glass was developed to act as an international standard for nuclear glass corrosion testing.
