= Stewardship cessation =

Stewardship cessation is a concept useful in system engineering. Certain systems remain hazardous for a considerable period after their useful life, and will usually be managed to ensure that the public and the environment is not exposed to the hazard. It is incumbent on the systems designer to consider the outcome should this stewardship be discontinued for any reason, and to design a system which is as robust as possible in the event of stewardship cessation.

== Examples ==
=== Nuclear industry ===
The most obvious example is the nuclear industry, and the radioactive waste it generates which will be a hazard for many centuries. In the present era, most high level waste is in still in currently managed facilities, but various methods are being considered for disposal. Most of the proposed disposal methods are designed to put the waste in a place so isolated from the environment that (it is hoped) immediate stewardship cessation would be safe and appropriate. However, many people are more comfortable with systems where the waste is still accessible, so that if there is an unforeseen problem with the disposal method, the waste can still be accessed to rectify the problem. These systems will still require some level of stewardship, but the system designer must consider that this may not be available for the hundreds of years required.

=== Satellites ===
Another example is when geostationary communications satellites reach the end of their useful lives. Stewardship cessation will occur hopefully in a planned manner, where the operator will move the satellite to a somewhat higher orbit to minimise the risk that the satellite will be a collision hazard to other satellites in the geostationary arc (graveyard burn). Unplanned stewardship cessation will occur if telecommand access to the satellite's systems is cut off due to a failure, for instance in the telecommand receivers.

== Reasons ==
Reasons for stewardship cessation include:

- Illegal or inappropriate disposal by the last user
- Budgetary constraints from government or other body
- Total societal breakdown or partial sociocultural change leading to a reduction in the perceived need for stewardship or simply to negligence
- Climate change putting the system beyond reach (under sea or ice)
- Global war
- Other catastrophe (e.g. epidemic) reducing the number of available stewards below the threshold necessary to maintain a continuous stewardship system
- For remotely operated systems, loss of communication with the remote segment of the system.

== See also ==
- Technology life cycle
