= Nuclear Waste Management Organization (Canada) =

Canadian nuclear WMO

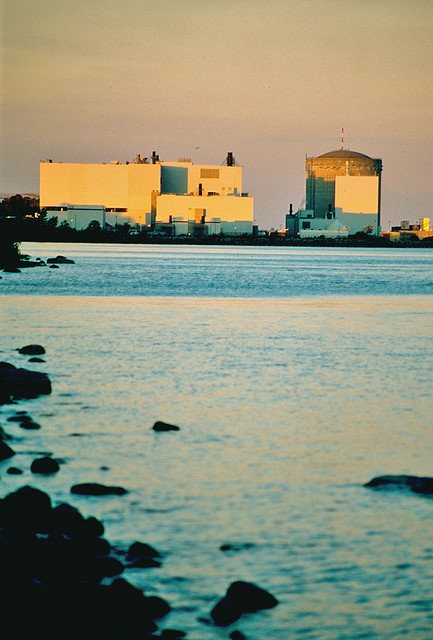
- Darlington Nuclear Generating Station, one of five nuclear reactor sites in Canada
- Abbreviation: NWMO
- Formation: 2002
- Founder: Elizabeth Dowdeswell, Founding President
- Type: Non-profit Canadian organization
- Purpose: Long-term management of Canada's used nuclear fuel
- Headquarters: Toronto, Ontario, Canada
- Region served: Canada
- President: Laurie Swami, BSc (Eng), MBA
- Website: http://www.nwmo.ca

The Nuclear Waste Management Organization (NWMO) of Canada was established in 2002 under the Nuclear Fuel Waste Act (NFWA) to investigate approaches for managing Canada's used nuclear fuel. The NWMO is the sole organization in Canada working towards the development of a deep geological repository (DGR) for the long-term storage of used nuclear fuel from Canadian nuclear power plants. Currently, nuclear power plants are operating in Ontario and New Brunswick.

The Act required Canadian electricity generating companies which produce used nuclear fuel to establish a waste management organization to provide recommendations to the Government of Canada on the long-term management of used nuclear fuel. The legislation also required the waste owners to establish segregated trust funds to finance the long-term management of the used fuel. The Act further authorized the Government of Canada to decide on the approach. The government's choice will then be implemented by the NWMO, subject to all of the necessary regulatory approvals.

== Adaptive Phased Management approach ==
In 2005, after a three-year study, the NWMO recommended Adaptive Phased Management (APM). In 2007, the Canadian government accepted NWMO's recommendation.

Adaptive Phased Management is both a technical method and a management system, with an emphasis on adaptability. Technically, it is centralized containment and isolation of used nuclear fuel in a deep geological repository. The management system involves manageable phases—each marked by explicit decision points with continuing participation by interested Canadians. It allows for go, no-go decisions at each stage to take advantage of new knowledge or changing societal priorities.

The end point of the technical method is the centralized containment and isolation of Canada's used nuclear fuel in a deep geological repository in an area with suitable geology and an informed and willing host. APM also involves the development of a transportation system to move the used fuel from the facilities where it is currently stored to the new site.

== Site selection process design ==
On May 4, 2009, the NWMO issued a discussion document outlining a proposed process for identifying an informed and willing community to host the deep geological repository. The $16 to $24 billion national infrastructure project will involve development of the repository and will include the creation of a centre of expertise.

A Proposed Process for Selecting a Site was designed to be responsive to direction provided by Canadians who participated in dialogues with the NWMO during 2008. These participants said they wanted to be sure, above all, that the selected site was safe and secure for people and the environment, now and in the future, and that the process for choosing the site would be grounded in values and objectives that Canadians hold important.

The discussion document set out scientific and technical requirements to guide site selection. It describes implementation through a partnership with an informed, willing community and it outlines proposed steps through which interested communities would be able to learn more as they consider their potential interest in hosting this project.

== Expressions of interest ==
Site selection commenced in 2010. In May, the NMWO called for communities across Canada to submit "expressions of interest" to host a waste management site. By March 2012, when the closing deadline was announced, 15 communities had made formal submissions. At the closing date of September 30, 2012, NWMO announced that 21 communities were "engaged in learning more about the project, the NWMO and the process. The total includes several communities that have asked the NWMO to begin more detailed preliminary assessment studies (Step 3), as well as communities that have requested information and briefings."

On January 24, 2020, the NWMO announced South Bruce and Ignace as two potential host areas remaining in the site selection process for the project. The decision followed agreements between the NWMO and landowners in South Bruce, Ont., allowing sufficient access to land studies in the area at a potential deep geological repository location.

== Selection ==
On November 28, 2024, the NMWO selected Wabigoon Lake Ojibway Nation (WLON) and the township of Ignace as the site of the project. Construction is expected to begin in the mid 2030s and become operational in the early 2040s.
