= Forsmark =

Swedish village

Coordinates: 60°22′N 18°09′E

Forsmark (Sweden)

Forsmark is a village on the east coast of Uppland, Sweden. It is best known as the location of the Forsmark Nuclear Power Plant as well as being the site of the Final repository for short-lived radioactive waste. A new long term fuel storage repositiary is also being cited in Forsmark.

Another noteworthy facility in Forsmark is the static inverter of HVDC Fenno-Skan, just west of the nuclear power plant.

Because of the sensitive instruments for detecting local leaks of radioactivity, the nuclear power plant was the first place outside the Soviet Union where signs of the Chernobyl accident were detected on April 27, 1986. When workers at the plant were found to carry radioactive particles, the origin of the leak was investigated and it eventually became clear that the contamination came from the atmosphere rather than from the Forsmark plant itself.

== History ==
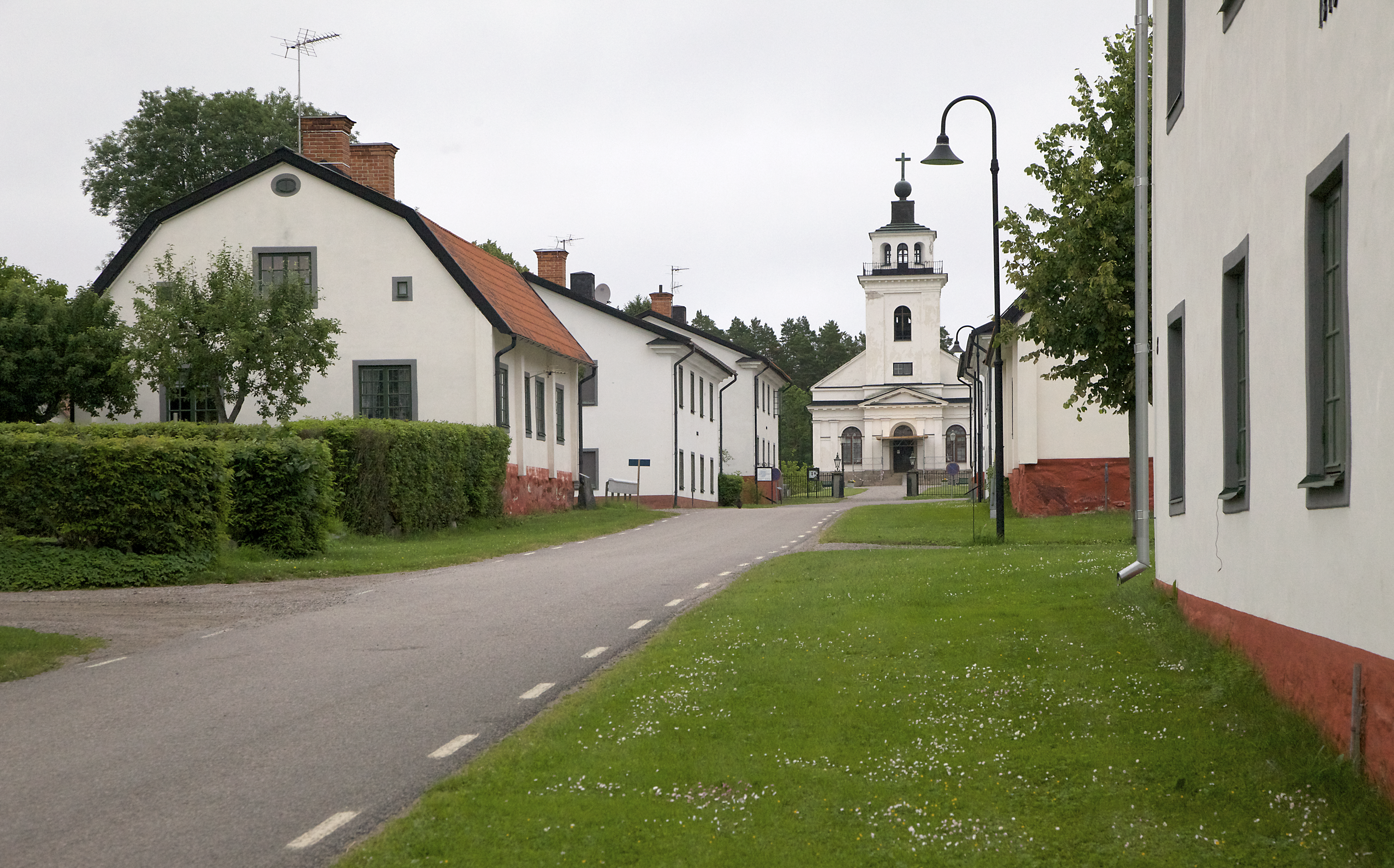
Village and Church

Forsmark formerly had an ironworks producing oregrounds iron. While the ironworks are closed, the industrial area, including the old Smithy buildings and water ponds are open to the public, along with a public inn. Historic buildings also include the Forsmarks Herrgård (manor house). Forsmark Church is an historic neoclassical designed church, begun in 1794 and completed in 1800.

Construction of the nuclear power plant at Forsmark began in 1971. In 1980, the first Forsmark nuclear reactor entered operational status.
