= Forsmark Nuclear Power Plant =

Nuclear power plant in Forsmark, Sweden

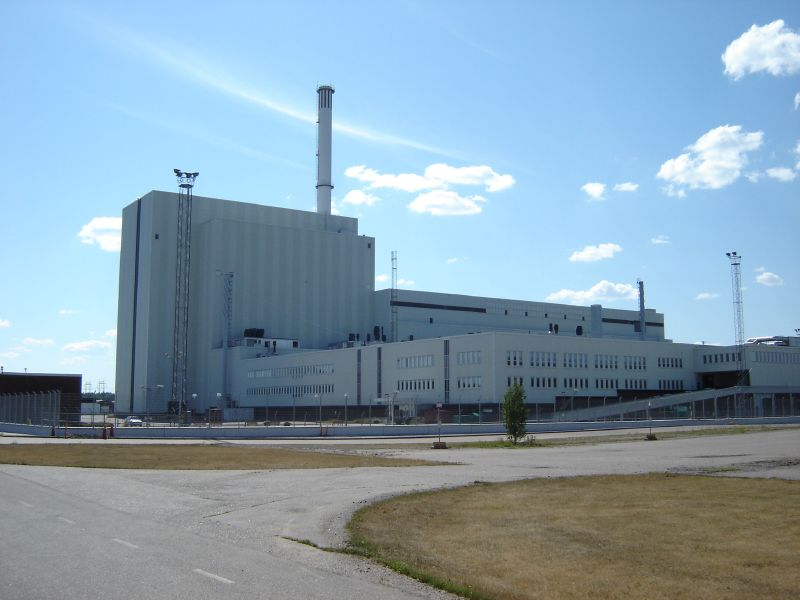
- Reactor 3 at Forsmark Nuclear Power Plant.
- Country: Sweden
- Location: Forsmark
- Coordinates: 60°24′12″N 18°10′0″E
- Status: Operational
- Commission date: 1980
- Owner: Forsmarks Kraftgrupp
- Operator: Vattenfall

Nuclear power station
- Reactor type: BWR
- Cooling source: Bothnian Sea

Power generation
- Units operational: 1 × 1010 MW; 1 × 1120 MW; 1 × 1190 MW
- Nameplate capacity: 3,320 MW
- Capacity factor: 84.5%
- Annual net output: 24,000 GW·h

External links
- Website: karnkraft.vattenfall.se/forsmark
- Commons: Related media on Commons

Forsmark Nuclear Power Plant is a nuclear power plant in Forsmark, Sweden that provides 14% of Sweden's total electricity output, and also the site of the Swedish Final repository for radioactive operational waste. It is operated by a company mainly owned by Vattenfall.

The radiation monitors at Forsmark were the first outside the Soviet Union to detect the elevated radiation levels resulting from the Chernobyl disaster in April 1986, over 1,000 km away, forcing the Soviet government to publicly acknowledge it after two days of them trying to cover it up.

== Reactors ==
Forsmark NPP has three Boiling water reactors:

- F1 with an ABB Atom BWR 69 at 2928 MW thermal and 1010 MWe net was first connected to the grid on 5 June 1980, and commenced commercial operation on 10 December 1980. It has two turbo-alternators.
- F2 with an ABB Atom BWR 69 at 3253 MW thermal and 1120 MWe net was first grid connected on 15 December 1980 and commenced commercial operation on 7 July 1981. It is a twin of Unit 1.
- F3 with an ABB Atom BWR 75 at 3300 MW thermal and 1190 MWe net and was first grid connected on 3 March 1985 and commenced commercial operation on 21 August 1985. It is a later design with one turbo-alternator.

== Other facilities ==
West of Forsmark Nuclear Power Plant is the static inverter of the Fenno–Skan HVDC connector between Sweden and Finland.

== Waste disposal ==
Forsmark is the proposed site for the long-term burial of all spent fuel from Swedish nuclear power reactors, using the KBS-3 process. The new site will be located next to the already existing final repository for radioactive operational waste, but the two will not be connected with each other. The municipal councils of Oskarshamn and Östhammar have voted in favor of the repository, and the final decision needs to be made by the Swedish government. On January 28, 2022, the government approved the construction of the encapsulation and final repository plants.

== Incidents ==
=== July 2006 incident ===
On 25 July 2006, one reactor was shut down after an electrical fault. According to the Swedish Nuclear Power Inspection authority SKI, the incident was rated 2 on the International Nuclear Event Scale. Initially it was rated 1 since two generators remained online. But once it was discovered that all four generators could have failed due to the same fault, the event was upgraded to 2.

The first proximal cause of the accident was maintenance work in the adjacent high-voltage yard by the Swedish grid operator Svenska kraftnät. An incorrect interlock procedure caused a disconnector to open which sustained an arc that caused a two-phase short circuit in equipment directly adjacent to the plant. This short caused the station generators to disconnect from the grid and, due to the failure of further safety systems this disconnection, in turn, led to a large overvoltage on various supplies within the station. The overvoltage caused failure of the control circuitry of two of the four redundant UPS systems which supplied the safety critical equipment at the plant, including cooling pumps and control circuitry. Though diesel generators started correctly even on these two systems, the lack of control circuitry led to their being unable to engage with their corresponding circuits. The other two UPS systems functioned correctly, surviving the overvoltage, probably due to an undetermined subtle difference in wiring or equipment between the two pairs of units. The reactor fully and effectively scrammed immediately on detecting these supply failures, however staff relied on neutron detector readings to determine reactor state due to lack of information on control rod state. At all times effective cooling was maintained by the pumps operating on the two functioning circuits. Though a number of options remained to operators, had further equipment failed, a single cause (one short-circuit) leading to such a cascade of failures was seen as a challenge to the principle of redundancy and safety in depth.

At the request of the Swedish Government, IAEA launched an OSART mission to Forsmark.

Lars-Olov Höglund, a former construction chief at Vattenfall, claimed it was the most serious nuclear incident in the world since the Chernobyl disaster and it was pure luck that prevented a meltdown. Both the SKI and the safety chief of Forsmark power plant disagree with that opinion and state that the incident was serious but the description provided by Höglund was incorrect and there was no real risk of a meltdown. Höglund has personally been involved in a legal dispute with Forsmark Nuclear powerplant for several years in connection with his private business. On March 14, 2011, Höglund commented that the Fukushima-disaster parallels the Forsmark incident, i.e. failing UPS system backup, and repeated his statement from 2007 that "only luck" prevented a meltdown at the Swedish plant.

However, Kjell Olsson, a researcher at SKI, later stated in an informal discussion with schoolchildren that a meltdown technically could have developed from the incident. The agency later stated that the failing safety system proved to be linked together in a delicate, extremely serious way.

=== February 2007 shutdown ===
On February 3, two units at Forsmark were shut down to inspect a rubber seal in one of the safety systems. On Forsmark 1 this seal needed to be replaced, a job that would take approximately one month. Unit 2 was cleared by the regulator SKI and was free to restart.

In January an internal report made by a few employees at Forsmark who were concerned over a "degrading safety culture" was leaked to media who ran an extensive story on it. In the storm following the report the Forsmark CEO chose to resign. Forsmark was already under way to implement a 60-point program designed to improve safety culture, designed shortly after the event in July 2006.

=== January 2022 drone sighting ===
On January 17, the Swedish Security Service took over an investigation into unauthorized drones seen flying over Forsmark and the Oskarshamn and Ringhals nuclear plants.

=== Incursions by activists ===
In June 2010, Greenpeace activists invaded Forsmark to protest the then-plan to remove the government prohibition on building new nuclear power plants. In October 2012, 50 anti-nuclear activists used special ladders to scale security fences. Greenpeace said that its non-violent actions were protests against the continuing operation of these reactors, which it says are unsafe in European stress tests, and to emphasise that stress tests did nothing to prepare against threats from outside the plant. A report by the Swedish nuclear regulator said that "the current overall level of protection against sabotage is insufficient". Although Swedish nuclear power plants have security guards, the police are responsible for emergency response. The report criticised the level of cooperation between nuclear site staff and police in the case of sabotage or attack.

== Local geology ==
The geology around Forsmark Nuclear Power Plant has been investigated in detail by various researchers and research groups. It has been of particular interest to understand the long-term geologic stability of the area. A 2018 study found that the area of Forsmark, whose surface belongs to the Sub-Cambrian peneplain, lost 2 to 3 meters of crystalline bedrock due to erosion during the last glaciation. This erosion consisted mostly of plucking of bedrock sheets and abrasion. The same group of researchers estimates the total erosion in the last million years to be in the order of 20 to 40 m.

== See also ==
- International Nuclear Events Scale
- Nuclear safety
- Nuclear power
