= Final repository for short-lived radioactive waste =

Coordinates: 60.406843°N 18.206741°E

The final repository for short-lived radioactive waste (Swedish: slutförvar för kortlivat radioaktivt avfal; SFR) is a radioactive waste repository in Forsmark, Sweden operated by the Swedish Nuclear Fuel and Waste Management Company. Active since April 1988, SFR stores all low- and intermediate-level waste produced by Sweden's nuclear power plants.

SFR has four separate rock vaults and one silo giving it a total capacity to store 60,000 cubic metres (2,100,000 cu ft) of radioactive waste. SFR currently receives approximately 600 cubic metres (21,000 cu ft) of waste per year.
