= Posiva =

Finnish company

- Type: Oy
- Industry: Energy
- Founded: 1995
- Headquarters: Eurajoki, Finland
- Products: Nuclear waste management
- Owner: Teollisuuden Voima and Fortum
- Website: www.posiva.fi/en/

Posiva Oy is a Finnish company with headquarters in the municipality of Eurajoki, Finland. It was founded in 1995 by Teollisuuden Voima (60% of stock) and Fortum (40% of stock), two Finnish nuclear plant operators, for researching and creating a method of final disposal of spent nuclear fuel from their plants.

For this purpose, Posiva is currently constructing the Onkalo spent nuclear fuel repository, the world's first deep geological repository, at the Olkiluoto Nuclear Power Plant site.
