= Onkalo spent nuclear fuel repository =

Deep geological repository for radioactive waste in Finland

Coordinates: 61°14′8″N 21°28′57″E

Schematic of the geologic repository research tunnel at the Onkalo site near Olkiluoto Nuclear Power Plant, Finland.

Location in Finland

The Onkalo spent nuclear fuel repository is a deep geological repository for the final disposal of spent nuclear fuel. It is near the Olkiluoto Nuclear Power Plant in the municipality of Eurajoki, on the west coast of Finland. It will be the world's first long-term disposal facility for spent nuclear fuel. (Note: The Waste Isolation Pilot Plant in the United States is for transuranic waste from dismantled nuclear weapons. Asse II and Morsleben in Germany were for low-level waste and intermediate-level waste.) It is being constructed by Posiva, and is based on the KBS-3 method of nuclear waste burial developed in Sweden by Svensk Kärnbränslehantering AB (SKB). The facility will be operational by 2026, and decommissioned by 2100.

== History ==
After the Finnish Nuclear Energy Act was amended in 1994 to specify that all nuclear waste produced in Finland must be disposed of in Finland, Olkiluoto was selected in 2000 as the site for a long-term underground storage facility for Finland's spent nuclear fuel. The facility, named "Onkalo" (meaning "small cave" or "cavity") is being built in the granite bedrock at the Olkiluoto site, about five kilometers from the power plants. The municipality of Eurajoki issued a building permit for the facility in August 2003 and excavation began in 2004.

The site was selected after a long process, which started in 1983 with a screening of the whole Finnish territory. From 1993 until 2000, four prospective sites were examined: Romuvaara in Kuhmo, Kivetty in Äänekoski, Olkiluoto in Eurajoki and Hästholmen in Loviisa. Besides geological and environmental considerations, the opinions of local residents were also taken into account. Eurajoki and Loviisa were singled out for being the locations with the highest local support. The former also had more favorable geographic conditions, thus in 1999 Posiva proposed it to the Finnish government as the selected location. The municipality of Eurajoki confirmed its approval of the site, and the national government ratified the decision in May 2001.

Posiva started construction of the site in 2004. The Finnish government issued the company a licence for constructing the final disposal facility on 12 November 2015. The site began testing and trials in August 2024, when empty fuel canisters were placed inside the burial chambers. Following a successful safety assesment by the Radiation and Nuclear Safety Authority, drilling of the deposit holes began in August 2026.

== Construction ==
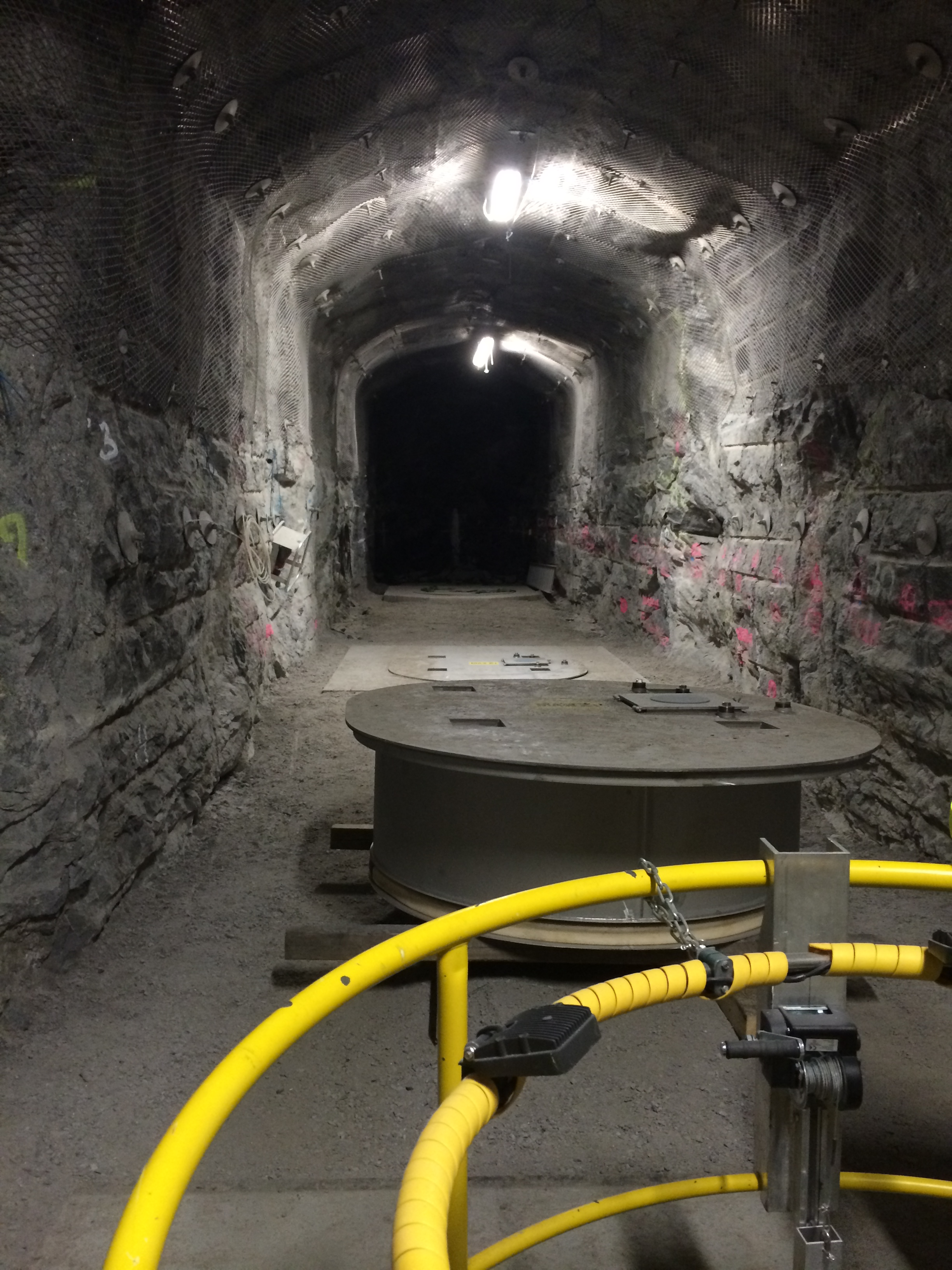
Pilot tunnel at final depth.

The facility was constructed by and will be operated by Posiva, a company owned by the two existing producers of nuclear power in Finland, Fortum and TVO. (Fennovoima, a company which was planning its first nuclear reactor, is not a stockholder of Posiva.)

The facility's constructions plans are divided into four phases:

- Phase 1 (2004–2009) focused on excavation of the large access tunnel to the facility, spiraling downward to a depth of 420 metres (1,380 ft).
- Phase 2 (2009–2011) continued the excavation to a final depth of 520 metres (1,710 ft). The characteristics of the bedrock were studied in order to adapt the layout of the repository.
  - In 2012, Posiva submitted an application for a license to construct the repository. The license was granted in November 2015.
- Phase 3 (2015–2017), construction of the repository.
- Phase 4, the encapsulation and burial of areas filled with spent fuel, [will begin] in 2026.

Once in operation, the disposal process will involve placing twelve fuel assemblies into a boron steel canister and enclosing it in a copper capsule. Each capsule will then be placed in its own hole in the repository and overpacked with bentonite clay. The construction cost of this project has so far been around €1 billion, and it is estimated that the operating of the site for one hundred years and eventually closing it will cost an additional €4 billion. In 2024 Finland produced 31133 GWh of electricity from nuclear power. Assuming the same production each year until Onkalo's closing the cost comes out to €0.0016/kWh. The State Nuclear Waste Management Fund has approximately €1.4 billion from charges for generated electricity.

The Onkalo repository is expected to be large enough to accept canisters of spent fuel for around one hundred years. At this point, the final encapsulation and burial will take place, and the access tunnel will be backfilled and sealed.

== Criticism ==
In 2012, a research group at the Royal Institute of Technology in Stockholm, Sweden, published research suggesting the copper capsules are not as corrosion-proof as the companies planning the repositories claim (see KBS-3). This was refuted when SKB undertook follow-up studies, which indicated that the alleged corrosion process does not exist, and that the initial experiments were not correctly executed and/or the wrong conclusions were drawn. In 2019, another study concluded that radiation effects should not significantly damage the canisters during 100,000 years.

== Treatment in media ==
Danish director Michael Madsen has co-written and directed a feature-length documentary, Into Eternity (2010), in which the initial phase of the excavation is featured and experts interviewed. The director's special emphasis is on the semiotic difficulties in meaningfully marking the depository as dangerous for people in the distant future.

American anthropologist Vincent Ialenti has written a book, Deep Time Reckoning (2020), that explores how Onkalo repository "safety case" experts envisioned distant future ecosystems and reflected on the limits of human knowledge. His book is based on 32 months of in-person fieldwork in Finland.

American singer and songwriter Emperor X used a sketch of the facility as the album art for the related song "10,000-Year Earworm to Discourage Resettlement Near Nuclear Waste Repositories".

Robert Macfarlane wrote about Onkalo in the last chapter of his book "Underland: A Deep Time Journey".

== See also ==
- Energy in Finland
- Nuclear power in Finland
- Long-term nuclear waste warning messages
