= Deep geological repository =

Long term storage for radioactive and hazardous waste

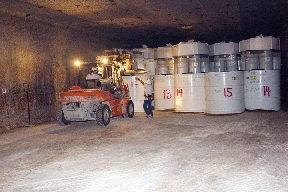
Technicians emplacing transuranic waste at the Waste Isolation Pilot Plant, near Carlsbad, New Mexico

A deep geological repository is a way of storing hazardous or radioactive waste within a stable geologic environment, typically 200–1,000 m underground. It entails a combination of waste form, waste package, engineered seals and geology that is suited to provide a high level of long-term isolation and containment without future maintenance. This is intended to prevent harm to human health or the environment from the radiological hazards of the waste. A number of mercury, cyanide and arsenic waste repositories are operating worldwide including Canada (Giant Mine) and Germany (potash mines in Herfa-Neurode and Zielitz). Radioactive waste storage sites are under construction with the Onkalo in Finland being the most advanced.

== Principles and background ==
Highly toxic waste that cannot be further recycled must be stored in isolation, to avoid contamination of air, ground and underground water. Deep geological repository is a type of long-term storage that isolates waste in geological structures that are expected to be stable for millions of years, with a number of natural and engineered barriers. Natural barriers include water-impermeable (e.g. clay) and gas-impermeable (e.g. salt) layers of rock above and surrounding the underground storage. Engineered barriers include bentonite clay and cement.

In 2011, the International Panel on Fissile Materials said:

It is widely accepted that spent nuclear fuel and high-level reprocessing and plutonium wastes require well-designed storage for periods ranging from tens of thousands to a million years, to minimize releases of the contained radioactivity into the environment. Safeguards are also required to ensure that neither plutonium nor highly enriched uranium is diverted to weapon use. There is general agreement that placing spent nuclear fuel in repositories hundreds of meters below the surface would be safer than indefinite storage of spent fuel on the surface [of the earth].

Common elements of repositories include the radioactive waste, the containers enclosing the waste, other engineered barriers or seals around the containers, the tunnels housing the containers, and the geologic makeup of the surrounding area.

A storage space hundreds of metres below the ground needs to withstand the effects of one or more future glaciations, with thick ice sheets resting on top of the rock. The presence of ice sheets affects the hydrostatic pressure at repository depth, groundwater flow and chemistry, and the potential for earthquakes. This is being taken into consideration by organizations preparing for long-term waste repositories in Sweden, Finland, Canada and some other countries that have to assess the effects of future glaciations.

Despite a long-standing agreement among many experts that geological disposal can be safe, technologically feasible and environmentally sound, a large part of the general public in many countries remains skeptical as a result of anti-nuclear campaigns. One of the challenges facing the supporters of these efforts is to demonstrate confidently that a repository will contain wastes for so long that any releases that might take place in the future will pose no significant health or environmental risk.

Nuclear reprocessing does not eliminate the need for a repository, but reduces the volume, the long-term radiation hazard, and long-term heat dissipation capacity needed. Reprocessing does not eliminate the political and community challenges to repository siting.

=== Natural radioactive repositories ===
Natural uranium ore deposits serve as proof of concept for stability of radioactive elements in geological formations—Cigar Lake Mine for example is a natural deposit of highly concentrated uranium ore located under sandstone and a quartz layer at a depth of 450 m, that is 1 billion years old with no radioactive leaks to the surface.

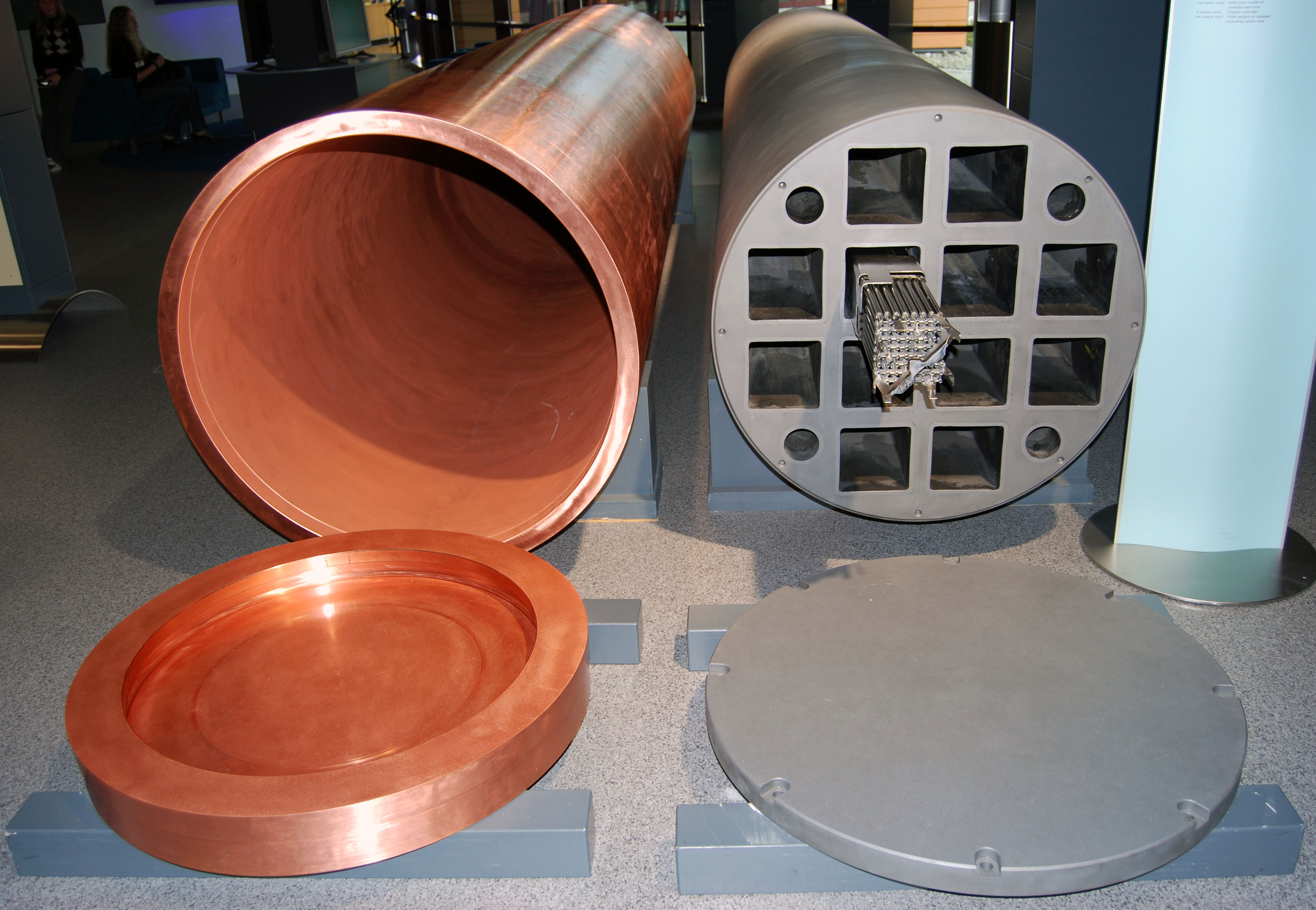
A Swedish KBS-3 capsule for nuclear waste

The ability of natural geologic barriers to isolate radioactive waste is demonstrated by the natural nuclear fission reactors at Oklo, Gabon. During their long reaction period about 5.4 tonnes of fission products as well as 1.5 tonnes of plutonium together with other transuranic elements were generated in the uranium ore body. This plutonium and the other transuranics remained immobile until the present day, a span of almost 2 billion years. This is remarkable as ground water had ready access to the deposits and they were not in a chemically inert form, such as glass.

== Research ==
Deep geologic disposal has been studied for several decades, including laboratory tests, exploratory boreholes, and the construction and operation of underground research laboratories where large-scale in-situ tests are being conducted. Major underground test facilities are listed below.

Country	Facility name	Location	Geology	Depth	Status
Belgium	HADES Underground Research Facility	Mol	plastic clay	223 m	in operation 1982
Canada	AECL Underground Research Laboratory	Pinawa	granite	420 m	1990–2006
Finland	Onkalo	Olkiluoto	granite	400 m	under construction
France	Meuse/Haute Marne Underground Research Laboratory	Bure	claystone	500 m	in operation 1999
Japan	Horonobe Underground Research Lab	Horonobe	sedimentary rock	500 m	under construction
Japan	Mizunami Underground Research Lab	Mizunami	granite	1000 m	under construction
South Korea	KAERI Underground Research Tunnel	Deajeon	granite	120 m	in operation 2006
Sweden	Äspö Hard Rock Laboratory	Oskarshamn	granite	450 m	in operation 1995
Switzerland	Grimsel Test Site	Grimsel Pass	granite	450 m	in operation 1984
Switzerland	Mont Terri Rock Laboratory	Mont Terri	claystone	300 m	in operation 1996
United States	Yucca Mountain nuclear waste repository	Nevada	tuff, ignimbrite	50 m	1997–2008

== Nuclear repository sites ==
Country	Facility Name	Location	Waste	Geology	Depth	Status
Argentina	Sierra del Medio	Gastre		granite		Proposed 1976, stopped 1996
Belgium	Hades (High-activity disposal experimental site)		high-level waste	plastic clay	~225 m	under discussion
Canada	OPG DGR	Ontario	200,000 m^{3} L&ILW	argillaceous limestone	680 m	license application 2011, canceled 2020
Canada	NWMO DGR	Ontario	spent fuel			siting
China						under discussion
Finland	VLJ	Olkiluoto	L&ILW	tonalite	60–100 m	in operation 1992
Finland		Loviisa	L&ILW	granite	120 m	in operation 1998
Finland	Onkalo	Olkiluoto	spent fuel	granite	400 m	under construction
France	Cigéo (Centre Industriel de Stockage Géologique)	Bure, Meuse	high-level waste	mudstone	500 m	license application 2023
Germany	Schacht Asse II	Lower Saxony		salt dome	750 m	closed 1995
Germany	Morsleben	Saxony-Anhalt	40,000 m^{3} L&ILW	salt dome	630 m	closed 1998
Germany	Gorleben	Lower Saxony	high-level waste	salt dome		proposed, on hold
Germany	Schacht Konrad	Lower Saxony	303,000 m^{3} L&ILW	sedimentary rock	800 m	under construction
Japan			Vitrified high-level waste		>300 m	under discussion
South Korea	Wolseong	Gyeongju	L&ILW		80 m	in operation 2015
South Korea			high-level waste			siting
Sweden	SFR	Forsmark	63,000 m^{3} L&ILW	granite	50 m	in operation 1988
Sweden		Forsmark	spent fuel	granite	450 m	license application 2011
Switzerland			high-level waste	clay		siting
United Kingdom			high-level waste			under discussion
United States	Waste Isolation Pilot Plant	New Mexico	transuranic waste	salt bed	655 m	in operation 1999
United States	Yucca Mountain Project	Nevada	70,000 ton HLW	ignimbrite	200–300 m	proposed, canceled 2010

== Status of repository at certain sites ==
A schematic of a geologic repository under construction at Olkiluoto Nuclear Power Plant site, Finland

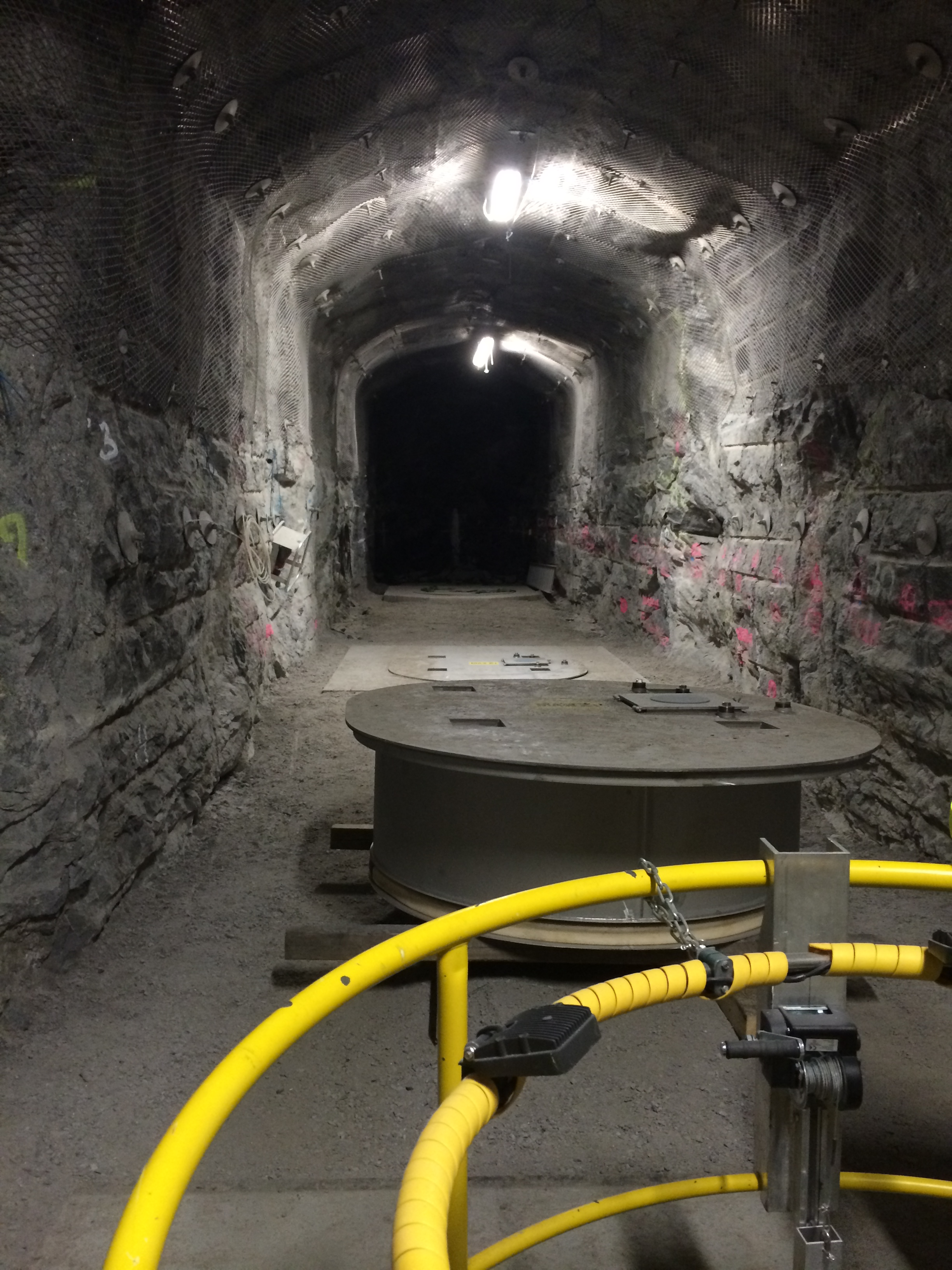
A demonstration tunnel in Olkiluoto.

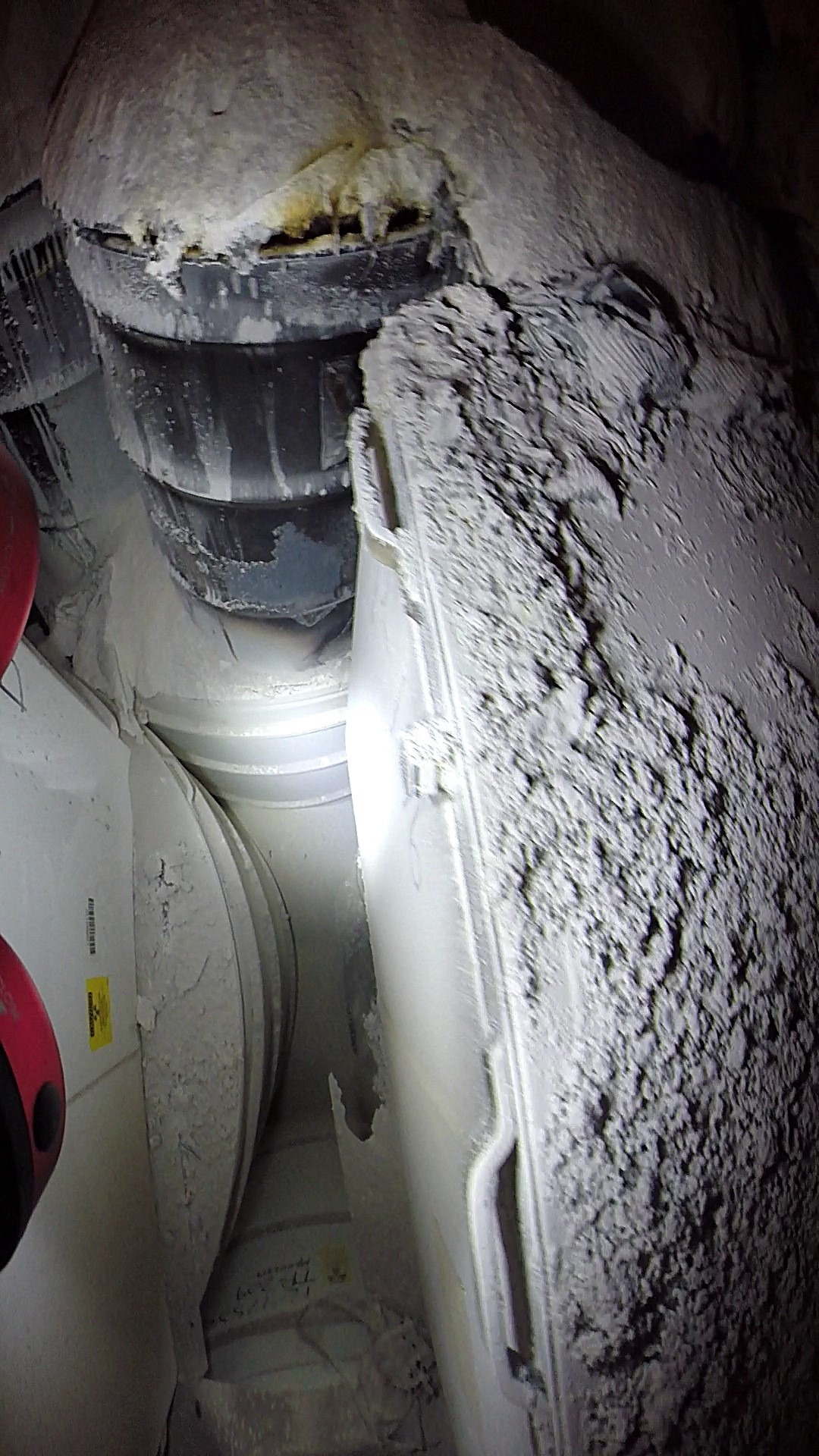
In February 2014, radioactive materials leaked from a damaged storage drum at the U. S. Waste Isolation Pilot Plant. Analysis of several accidents, by the U.S. Department Of Energy, have shown lack of a "safety culture".

The process of selecting appropriate deep final repositories is under way in several countries, with the first expected to be commissioned some time after 2010.

=== Australia ===
There was a proposal in the early 2000s for an international high level waste repository in Australia and Russia. Since the proposal for a global repository in Australia, which has never produced nuclear power, and has one research reactor, was raised, domestic political objections have been loud and sustained, making such a facility in Australia unlikely.

=== Canada ===
Giant Mine has been used as a deep repository for storage of highly toxic arsenic waste in the form of powder. As of 2020 there is ongoing research to reprocess the waste into a frozen block form which is more chemically stable and prevents water contamination.

On Nov 28, 2024, the NWMO selected the Wabigoon Lake Ojibway Nation-Ignace area as the site for Canada's deep geological repository for used nuclear fuel.

=== Finland ===
The Onkalo site in Finland based on the KBS-3 technology, is the furthest along the road to becoming operational among repositories worldwide. Posiva started construction of the site in 2004. The Finnish government issued the company a licence for constructing the final disposal facility in November 2015. Posiva has applied for an operating licence to begin disposals, but As of March 2026, the response from the regulator, STUK, is delayed until the end of June 2026.

=== Germany ===
A number of repositories including potash mines in Herfa-Neurode and Zielitz have been used for years for the storage of highly toxic mercury, cyanide and arsenic waste. There is little debate in Germany regarding toxic waste, in spite of the fact that unlike nuclear waste, it does not lose toxicity with time.

There is a debate about the search for a final repository for radioactive waste, accompanied by protests, especially in the Gorleben village in the Wendland area, which was seen as ideal for the final repository until 1990 because of its location in a remote, economically depressed corner of West Germany, next to the closed border to the former East Germany. After reunification, the village is now close to the center of Germany, and is now used for temporary storage of nuclear waste.

The pit Asse II is a former salt mine in the mountain range of Asse in Lower Saxony/Germany, that was allegedly used as a research mine since 1965. Between 1967 and 1978, radioactive waste was placed in storage. Research indicated that brine contaminated with radioactive caesium-137, plutonium and strontium was leaking from the mine since 1988 but was not reported until June 2008. The repository for radioactive waste Morsleben is a deep geological repository for radioactive waste in the rock salt mine Bartensleben in Morsleben, in Saxony-Anhalt/Germany, that was used from 1972 to 1998. Since 2003, 480,000 m^{3} (630,000 cu yd) of salt-concrete has been pumped into the pit to temporarily stabilize the upper levels.

=== Sweden ===
Approval was granted in January 2022 for the construction of a direct disposal facility using KBS-3 technology, on the site of the Forsmark nuclear power plant.

=== United Kingdom ===
The UK Government, in common with many other countries and supported by scientific advice, has identified permanent deep underground disposal as the most appropriate means of disposing of higher activity radioactive waste.

Radioactive Waste Management (RWM) was established in 2014 to deliver a Geological Disposal Facility (GDF) and is a subsidiary of the Nuclear Decommissioning Authority (NDA) which is responsible for clean-up of the UK's historical nuclear sites. In 2022, Nuclear Waste Services (NWS) formed from the merger of RWM with the Low Level Waste Repository in Cumbria.

A GDF will be delivered through a community consent-based process , working in close partnership with communities, building trust for the long term and ensuring a GDF supports local interests and priorities.

The first Working Groups were established in Copeland and Allerdale in Cumbria during late 2020 and early 2021. These Working Groups have started the process of obtaining consent for hosting a GDF in their areas. These Working Groups are believed to be a critical step in the process to find a willing community and a suitable, feasible and acceptable site for a GDF. Allerdale withdrew from the process to select a deep waste repository site in 2023. NWS explained this decision in terms of there being insufficient extent of potentially suitable geology in which to undertake a site selection process.

RWM continues to have discussions in a range of places across England with people and organisations who are interested in exploring the benefits of hosting a GDF. More Working Groups are anticipated to form across the country in the next year or two.

In 2025, the HM Treasury's National Infrastructure and Service Transformation Authority annual review graded the project, estimated to cost up to £54 billion, as "unachievable", stating it had "major issues with project definition, schedule, budget, quality and/or benefits delivery, which at this stage do not appear to be manageable or resolvable."

=== United States ===
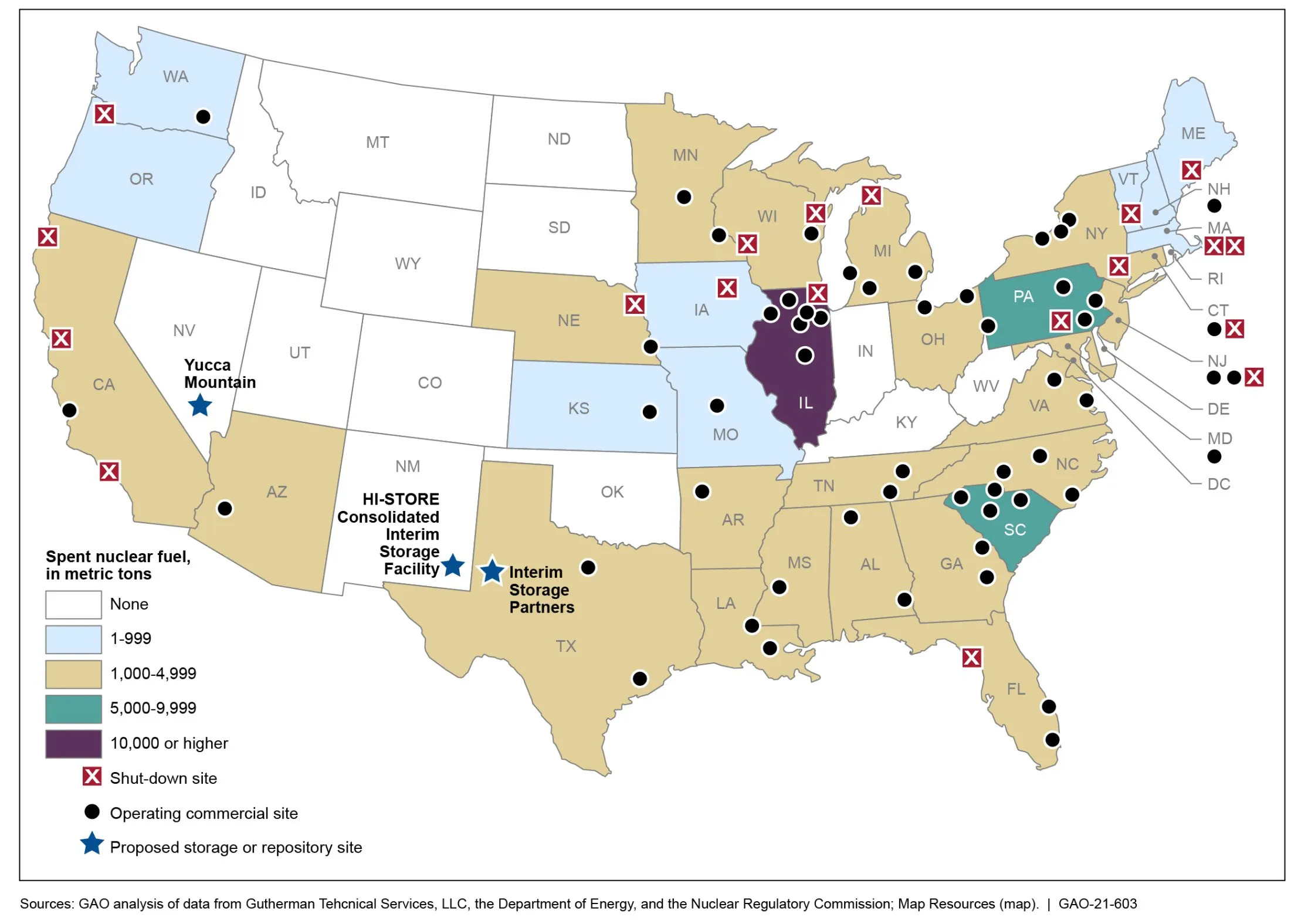
Yucca Mountain nuclear waste repository and the locations across the U.S. where nuclear waste is stored

The Waste Isolation Pilot Plant (WIPP) in the United States went into service in 1999 by putting the first cubic metres of transuranic radioactive waste in a deep layer of salt near Carlsbad, New Mexico.

In 1978, the U.S. Department of Energy (DOE) began studying Yucca Mountain, within the secure boundaries of the Nevada Test Site in Nye County, Nevada, to determine whether it would be suitable for a long-term geologic repository for spent nuclear fuel and high-level radioactive waste. This project faced significant opposition and suffered delays due to litigation by the Agency for Nuclear Projects for the State of Nevada (Nuclear Waste Project Office) and others. The Obama administration rejected use of the site in the 2009 United States Federal Budget proposal, which eliminated all funding except that needed to answer inquiries from the U.S. Nuclear Regulatory Commission (NRC), "while the Administration devises a new strategy toward nuclear waste disposal."

In March 2009, Energy Secretary Steven Chu told a Senate hearing the Yucca Mountain site is no longer viewed as an option for storing reactor waste.

In June 2018, the Trump administration and some members of Congress again began proposing using Yucca Mountain, with senators from Nevada raising opposition.

In February 2020, U.S. President Donald Trump tweeted about a potential change of policy on plans to use Yucca Mountain in Nevada as a repository for nuclear waste. Trump's previous budgets have included funding for Yucca Mountain but, according to Nuclear Engineering International, two senior administration officials said that the latest spending blueprint will not include any money for licensing the project. On February 7, Energy Secretary Dan Brouillette echoed Trump's sentiment and stated that the U.S. administration may investigate other types of [nuclear] storage, such as interim or temporary sites in other parts of the country.

Though no formal plan had solidified from the federal government, the private sector moved forward with their own plans. Holtec International submitted a license application to the NRC for an autonomous consolidated interim storage facility (CISF) in southeastern New Mexico in March 2017. Similarly, Interim Storage Partners is also planning to build and operate a CISF in Andrews County, Texas. Meanwhile, other companies have indicated that they are prepared to bid on an anticipated procurement from the DOE to design a facility for interim storage of nuclear waste. The NRC issued a licence for the Andrews County CISF in September 2021. A group including the State of Texas petitioned for a court review of the licence. In August 2023, the United States Court of Appeals for the Fifth Circuit ruled that the NRC does not have the authority from Congress to license such a temporary storage facility that is not at a nuclear power station or federal site, nullifying the purported license. The other New Mexico CISF is similarly being challenged in the United States Court of Appeals for the Tenth Circuit.

Deep Isolation, a corporation based in Berkeley, California, proposed a solution involving horizontal storage of radioactive waste canisters in directional boreholes, using technology developed for oil and gas mining. An 18" borehole can be directed vertically to the depth of several thousand feet in geologically stable formations, and then a horizontal waste disposal section of similar length can be created where waste canisters are stored before the borehole is sealed.

== See also ==
- High-level radioactive waste management – Management and disposal of highly radioactive materials
- Long-term nuclear waste warning messages – Messages to deter human intrusion at nuclear waste repositories in the far future
