= High-level waste =

Highly radioactive waste material

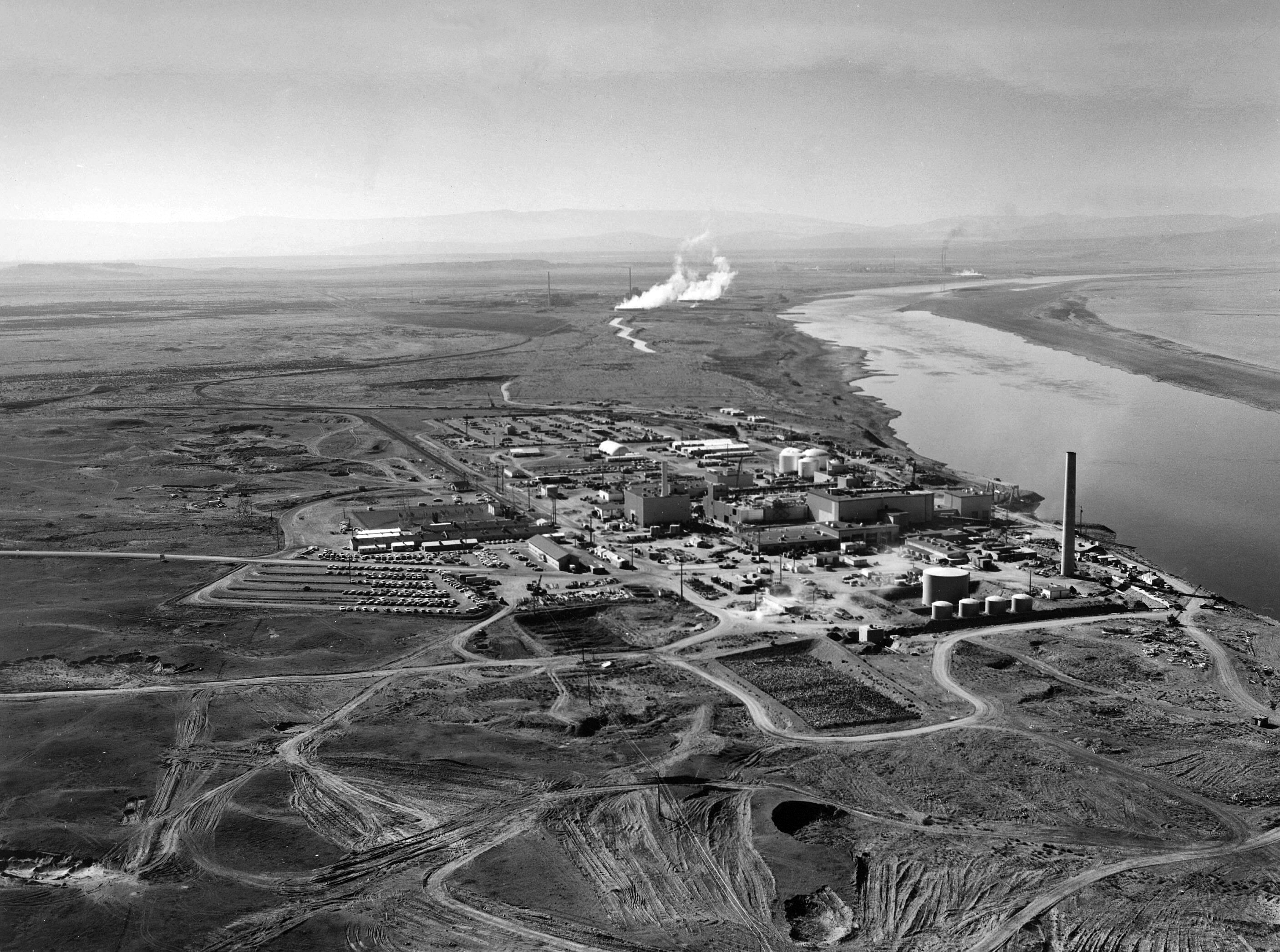
The Hanford site represents 7-9 percent of America's high-level radioactive waste by volume. Nuclear reactors line the riverbank at the Hanford Site along the Columbia River in January 1960.

High-level waste (HLW) is a type of nuclear waste created by the irradiation of nuclear fuel in a reactor. Irradiation causes a build-up of fission products and transuranic elements (generated by capture of neutrons) in the fuel. Fission products typically have a much shorter half-life than uranium, which means the irradiated fuel is more radioactive and thus hotter than fresh fuel – high-level waste has heat output of >2 kW/m^{3}. At the same time, the fissile material (usually uranium-235) is used up, so that the fuel is no longer able to sustain the operation of the reactor and must be recycled or disposed of as waste.

High-level waste includes spent nuclear fuel itself as well as the byproducts of nuclear reprocessing, which results in liquid raffinates and other waste streams. Liquid wastes are not suitable for disposal, so these are vitrified to convert them into a solid, glass form which is suitable for disposal.

Liquid high-level waste is typically held temporarily in underground tanks pending vitrification. Most of the high-level waste created by the Manhattan Project and the weapons programs of the Cold War exists in this form because funding for further processing was typically not part of the original weapons programs. Both spent nuclear fuel and vitrified waste are considered as suitable forms for long term disposal, after a period of temporary storage in the case of spent nuclear fuel.

HLW accounts for over 95% of the total radioactivity produced in the nuclear power process. In other words, while most nuclear waste is low-level and intermediate-level waste, such as protective clothing and equipment that have been contaminated with radiation, the majority of the radioactivity produced from the nuclear power generation process comes from high-level waste.

Some countries, particularly France, reprocess commercial spent fuel. The United Kingdom reprocessed commercial spent fuel from its Magnox reactor fleet up until 2022.

High-level waste is very radioactive and, therefore, requires special shielding during handling and transport. Initially it also needs cooling, because it generates a great deal of heat. Most of the heat, at least after short-lived nuclides have decayed, is from the medium-lived fission products caesium-137 and strontium-90, which have half-lives on the order of 30 years.

A typical large 1000 MWe nuclear reactor produces 25–30 tons of spent fuel per year.

It is generally accepted that the final waste will be disposed of in a deep geological repository, and many countries have developed plans for such a site, including Finland, France, Japan, United States, United Kingdom and Sweden.

== Definitions ==
Long-lived fission products
Nuclide	t_{1/2}	Yield	Q (Note: Decay energy is split among β, neutrino, and γ if any.)	βγ
	(Ma)	(%) (Note: Per 65 thermal neutron fissions of ^{235}U and 35 of ^{239}Pu.)	(keV)	
^{99}Tc	0.211	6.1385	294	β
^{126}Sn	0.23	0.1084	4050 (Note: Has decay energy 380 keV, but its decay product ^{126}Sb has decay energy 3.67 MeV.)	βγ
^{79}Se	0.33	0.0447	151	β
^{135}Cs	1.33	6.9110 (Note: Lower in thermal reactors because ^{135}Xe, its predecessor, readily absorbs neutrons.)	269	β
^{93}Zr	1.61	5.4575	91	βγ
^{107}Pd	6.5	1.2499	33	β
^{129}I	16.1	0.8410	194	βγ

Different countries have different internal waste categorisation systems, meaning which wastes are categorised as high-level varies accordingly. In its simplest definition, high-level waste is all waste which experiences a significant degree of radiogenic self-heating. Wastes without such heating but which still require special disposal considerations due to hazardous levels of radioactivity may instead be classified as intermediate-level waste (ILW).

High-level waste can refer to all self-heating wastes, though is sometimes used specifically for material resulting from the reprocessing of spent nuclear fuel, including liquid waste produced directly in reprocessing and any solid material derived from such liquid waste that contains fission products in sufficient concentrations. This reprocessing definition of HLW excludes spent nuclear fuel, though they are commonly considered in tandem amongst other highly radioactive material that is determined, consistent with existing law, to require permanent isolation.

Spent (used) reactor fuel.

- Spent nuclear fuel is used reactor fuel that is no longer efficient in creating electricity, because its fission process has slowed due to a build-up of reaction poisons. However, it is still thermally hot, highly radioactive, and potentially harmful.

Waste materials from reprocessing.

- Materials for nuclear weapons are acquired by reprocessing spent nuclear fuel from breeder reactors. Reprocessing is a method of chemically treating spent fuel to separate out uranium and plutonium. The byproduct of reprocessing is a highly radioactive sludge residue known as highly-active liquor (HAL).

== Storage ==
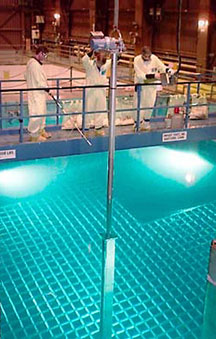
Spent fuel pool

High-level radioactive waste is stored for 10 or 20 years in spent fuel pools, and then can be put in dry cask storage facilities.

In 1997, in the 20 countries which account for most of the world's nuclear power generation, spent fuel storage capacity at the reactors was 148,000 tonnes, with 59% of this utilized. Away-from-reactor storage capacity was 78,000 tonnes, with 44% utilized.

== See also ==
- Radioactive waste
- Low-level waste
- Transuranic waste
- Mixed waste
- Into Eternity (film)
