= Radioactive waste =

Unusable radioactive materials

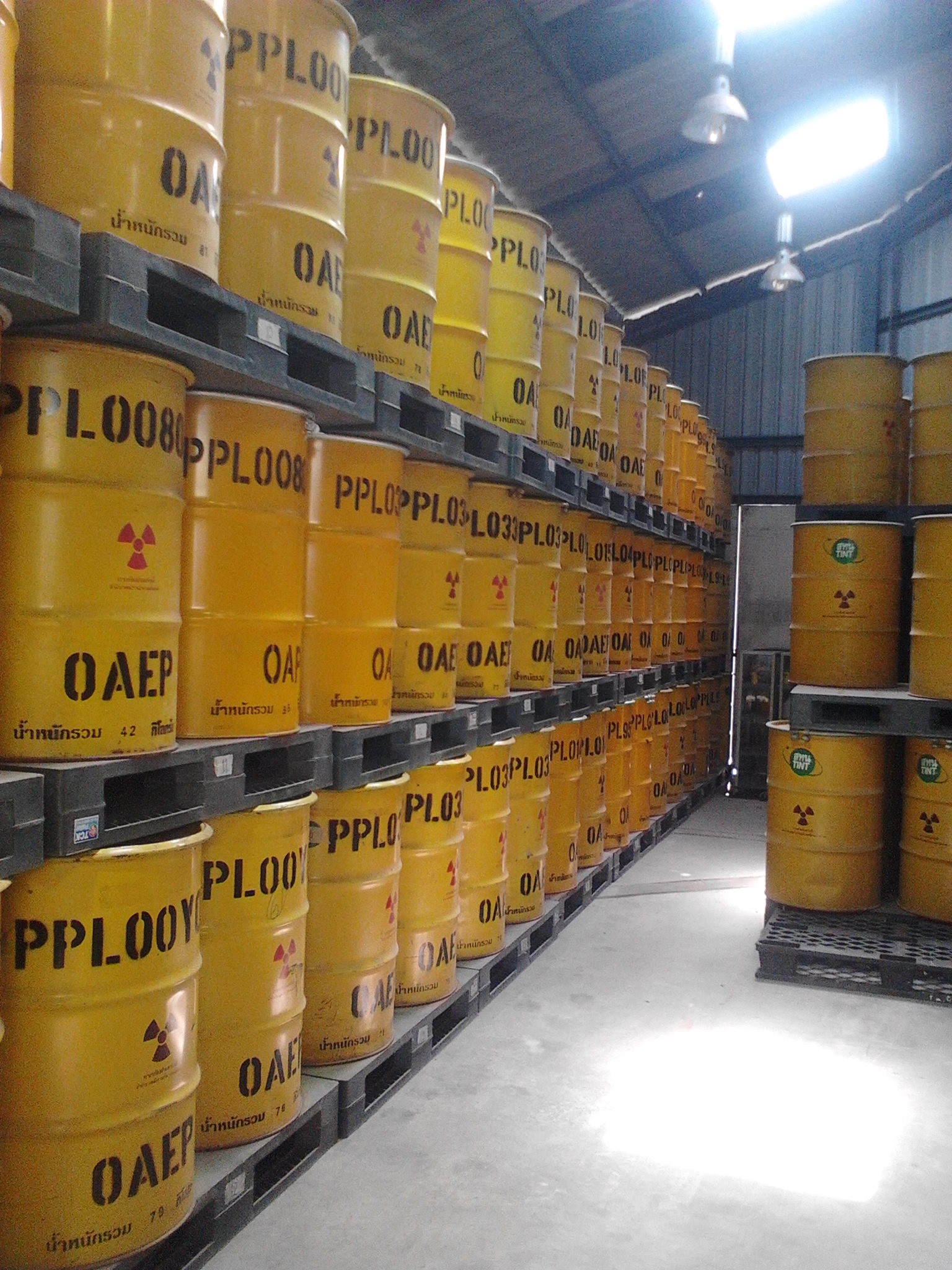
Thailand Institute of Nuclear Technology (TINT) low-level radioactive waste barrels

Radioactive waste is a type of hazardous waste that contains radioactive material. It is a result of various activities, including nuclear medicine, nuclear research, nuclear power generation, nuclear decommissioning, rare-earth mining, and nuclear weapons reprocessing. The storage and disposal of radioactive waste is regulated by government agencies in order to protect human health and the environment.

Radioactive waste is broadly classified into three categories: low-level waste (LLW), such as paper, rags, tools, and clothing, which contain small amounts of mostly short-lived radioactivity; intermediate-level waste (ILW), which contains higher amounts of radioactivity and requires some shielding; and high-level waste (HLW), which is highly radioactive and hot due to decay heat, thus requiring cooling and shielding.

Spent nuclear fuel can be processed in nuclear reprocessing plants. One third of the total amount has already been reprocessed. With nuclear reprocessing, 96% of the spent fuel can be recycled back into uranium-based and mixed-oxide (MOX) fuels. The residual 4% is minor actinides and fission products, the latter of which are a mixture of stable and quickly decaying (most likely already having decayed in the spent fuel pool) elements, medium lived fission products such as strontium-90 and caesium-137 and finally seven long-lived fission products with half-lives in the hundreds of thousands to millions of years. The minor actinides, meanwhile, are heavy elements other than uranium and plutonium which are created by neutron capture. Their half-lives range from years to millions of years and as alpha emitters they are particularly radiotoxic. While there are proposed – and to a much lesser extent current – uses of all those elements, commercial-scale reprocessing using the PUREX-process disposes of them as waste together with the fission products. The waste is subsequently converted into a glass-like ceramic for storage in a deep geological repository.

The duration that radioactive waste must be stored depends on the type of waste and radioactive isotopes it contains. Short-term approaches to radioactive waste storage have been segregation and storage on the surface or near-surface of the earth. Burial in a deep geological repository is a favored solution for long-term storage of high-level waste, while re-use and transmutation are favored solutions for reducing the HLW inventory. Boundaries to recycling of spent nuclear fuel are regulatory and economic as well as the problem of radioactive contamination if chemical separation processes cannot achieve a very high purity. Furthermore, elements may be present in both useful and troublesome isotopes, which would require costly and energy intensive isotope separation for their use – a currently uneconomic prospect.

A summary of the amounts of radioactive waste and management approaches for most developed countries are presented and reviewed periodically as part of a joint convention of the International Atomic Energy Agency (IAEA).

== Nature and significance ==
A quantity of radioactive waste typically consists of a number of radionuclides, which are unstable isotopes of elements that undergo decay and thereby emit ionizing radiation, which is harmful to humans and the environment. Different isotopes emit different types and levels of radiation, which last for different periods of time.

=== Physics ===
Medium-lived fission products
Nuclide	t_{1/2}	Yield	Q (Note: Decay energy is split among β, neutrino, and γ if any.)	βγ
	(a)	(%) (Note: Per 65 thermal neutron fissions of ^{235}U and 35 of ^{239}Pu.)	(keV)	
^{155}Eu	4.74	0.0803 (Note: Neutron poison; in thermal reactors, most is destroyed by further neutron capture.)	252	βγ
^{85}Kr	10.73	0.2180 (Note: Less than 1/4 of mass-85 fission products as most bypass ground state: ^{85}Br → ^{85m}Kr → ^{85}Rb.)	687	βγ
^{113m}Cd	13.9	0.0008	316	β
^{90}Sr	28.91	4.505	2826 (Note: Has decay energy 546 keV; its decay product ^{90}Y has decay energy 2.28 MeV with weak gamma branching.)	β
^{137}Cs	30.04	6.337	1176	βγ
^{121m}Sn	43.9	0.00005	390	βγ
^{151}Sm	94.6	0.5314	77	β

Long-lived fission products
Nuclide	t_{1/2}	Yield	Q (Note: Decay energy is split among β, neutrino, and γ if any.)	βγ
	(Ma)	(%) (Note: Per 65 thermal neutron fissions of ^{235}U and 35 of ^{239}Pu.)	(keV)	
^{99}Tc	0.211	6.1385	294	β
^{126}Sn	0.23	0.1084	4050 (Note: Has decay energy 380 keV, but its decay product ^{126}Sb has decay energy 3.67 MeV.)	βγ
^{79}Se	0.33	0.0447	151	β
^{135}Cs	1.33	6.9110 (Note: Lower in thermal reactors because ^{135}Xe, its predecessor, readily absorbs neutrons.)	269	β
^{93}Zr	1.61	5.4575	91	βγ
^{107}Pd	6.5	1.2499	33	β
^{129}I	16.1	0.8410	194	βγ

The radioactivity of all radioactive waste weakens with time. All radionuclides contained in the waste have a half-life—the time it takes for half of the atoms to decay into another nuclide. Eventually, all radioactive waste decays into non-radioactive elements (i.e., stable nuclides). Since radioactive decay follows the half-life rule, the rate of decay is inversely proportional to the duration of decay. In other words, the radiation from a long-lived isotope like iodine-129 will be much less intense than that of a short-lived isotope like iodine-131. The two tables show some of the major radioisotopes, their half-lives, and their radiation yield as a proportion of the yield of fission of uranium-235.

The energy and the type of the ionizing radiation emitted by a radioactive substance are also important factors in determining its threat to humans. The chemical properties of the radioactive element will determine how mobile the substance is and how likely it is to spread into the environment and contaminate humans. This is further complicated by the fact that many radioisotopes do not decay immediately to a stable state but rather to radioactive decay products within a decay chain before ultimately reaching a stable state.

=== Pharmacokinetics ===
Exposure to radioactive waste may cause health impacts due to ionizing radiation exposure. In humans, a dose of 1 sievert carries a 5.5% risk of developing cancer, and regulatory agencies assume the risk is linearly proportional to dose even for low doses. Ionizing radiation can cause deletions in chromosomes. If a developing organism such as a fetus is irradiated, it is possible a birth defect may be induced, but it is unlikely this defect will be in a gamete or a gamete-forming cell. The incidence of radiation-induced mutations in humans is small, as in most mammals, because of natural cellular-repair mechanisms, many just now coming to light. These mechanisms range from DNA, mRNA and protein repair, to internal lysosomic digestion of defective proteins, and even induced cell suicide—apoptosis

Depending on the decay mode and the pharmacokinetics of an element (how the body processes it and how quickly), the threat due to exposure to a given activity of a radioisotope will differ. For instance, iodine-131 is a short-lived beta and gamma emitter, but because it concentrates in the thyroid gland, it is more able to cause injury than caesium-137 which, being water soluble, is rapidly excreted through urine. In a similar way, the alpha emitting actinides and radium are considered very harmful as they tend to have long biological half-lives and their radiation has a high relative biological effectiveness, making it far more damaging to tissues per amount of energy deposited. Because of such differences, the rules determining biological injury differ widely according to the radioisotope, time of exposure, and sometimes also the nature of the chemical compound which contains the radioisotope.

== Sources ==
Actinides and fission products by half-life
Actinides by decay chain				Half-life range (a)	Fission products of ^{235}U by yield
4n (Thorium)	4n + 1 (Neptunium)	4n + 2 (Radium)	4n + 3 (Actinium)	Half-life range (a)	4.5–7%	0.04–1.25%	<0.001%
^{228}Ra^{№}				4–6 a		^{155}Eu^{þ}
^{248}Bk				> 9 a
^{244}Cm^{ƒ}	^{241}Pu^{ƒ}	^{250}Cf	^{227}Ac^{№}	10–29 a	^{90}Sr	^{85}Kr	^{113m}Cd^{þ}
^{232}U^{ƒ}		^{238}Pu^{ƒ}	^{243}Cm^{ƒ}	29–97 a	^{137}Cs	^{151}Sm^{þ}	^{121m}Sn
	^{249}Cf^{ƒ}	^{242m}Am^{ƒ}		141–351 a	No fission products have a half-life in the range of 100 a–210 ka ...
	^{241}Am^{ƒ}		^{251}Cf^{ƒ}	430–900 a	No fission products have a half-life in the range of 100 a–210 ka ...
		^{226}Ra^{№}	^{247}Bk	1.3–1.6 ka	No fission products have a half-life in the range of 100 a–210 ka ...
^{240}Pu	^{229}Th	^{246}Cm^{ƒ}	^{243}Am^{ƒ}	4.7–7.4 ka	No fission products have a half-life in the range of 100 a–210 ka ...
	^{245}Cm^{ƒ}	^{250}Cm		8.3–8.5 ka	No fission products have a half-life in the range of 100 a–210 ka ...
			^{239}Pu^{ƒ}	24.1 ka	No fission products have a half-life in the range of 100 a–210 ka ...
		^{230}Th^{№}	^{231}Pa^{№}	32–76 ka	No fission products have a half-life in the range of 100 a–210 ka ...
^{236}Np^{ƒ}	^{233}U^{ƒ}	^{234}U^{№}		150–250 ka	^{99}Tc^{₡}	^{126}Sn
^{248}Cm		^{242}Pu		327–375 ka		^{79}Se^{₡}
				1.33 Ma	^{135}Cs^{₡}
	^{237}Np^{ƒ}			1.61–6.5 Ma	^{93}Zr	^{107}Pd
^{236}U			^{247}Cm^{ƒ}	15–24 Ma		^{129}I^{₡}
^{244}Pu				80 Ma	... nor beyond 15.7 Ma
^{232}Th^{№}		^{238}U^{№}	^{235}U^{ƒ№}	0.7–14.1 Ga	... nor beyond 15.7 Ma
₡, has thermal neutron capture cross section in the range of 8–50 barns; ƒ, fissile; №, primarily a naturally occurring radioactive material (NORM); þ, neutron poison (thermal neutron capture cross section greater than 3k barns)

Radioactive waste comes from a number of sources. In countries with nuclear power plants, nuclear armament, or nuclear fuel treatment plants, the majority of waste originates from the nuclear fuel cycle and nuclear weapons reprocessing. Other sources include medical and industrial wastes, as well as naturally occurring radioactive materials (NORM) that can be concentrated as a result of the processing or consumption of coal, oil, and gas, and some minerals, as discussed below.

=== Nuclear fuel cycle ===
==== Front end ====
Waste from the front end of the nuclear fuel cycle is usually alpha-emitting waste from the extraction of uranium. It often contains radium and its decay products.

Uranium dioxide (UO_{2}) concentrate from mining is a thousand or so times as radioactive as the granite used in buildings. It is refined from yellowcake (U_{3}O_{8}), then converted to uranium hexafluoride gas (UF_{6}). As a gas, it undergoes enrichment to increase the U-235 content from 0.7% to about 4.4% (LEU). It is then turned into a hard ceramic oxide (UO_{2}) for assembly as reactor fuel elements.

The main by-product of enrichment is depleted uranium (DU), principally the U-238 isotope, with a U-235 content of ~0.3%. It is stored, either as UF_{6} or as U_{3}O_{8}. Some is used in applications where its extremely high density makes it valuable such as anti-tank shells, and on at least one occasion even a sailboat keel. It is also used with plutonium for making mixed oxide fuel (MOX) and to dilute, or downblend, highly enriched uranium from weapons stockpiles which is now being redirected to become reactor fuel.

==== Back end ====
The back-end of the nuclear fuel cycle, mostly spent fuel rods, contains fission products that emit beta and gamma radiation, and actinides that emit alpha particles, such as uranium-234 (half-life 245 thousand years), neptunium-237 (2.144 million years), plutonium-238 (87.7 years) and americium-241 (432 years), and even sometimes some neutron emitters such as californium (half-life of 898 years for californium-251). These isotopes are formed in nuclear reactors.

It is important to distinguish the processing of uranium to make fuel from the reprocessing of used fuel. Used fuel contains the highly radioactive products of fission (see high-level waste below). Many of these are neutron absorbers, called neutron poisons in this context. These eventually build up to a level where they absorb so many neutrons that the chain reaction stops, even with the control rods completely removed from a reactor. At that point, the fuel has to be replaced in the reactor with fresh fuel, even though there is still a substantial quantity of uranium-235 and plutonium present. In the United States, this used fuel is usually "stored", while in other countries such as Russia, the United Kingdom, France, Japan, and India, the fuel is reprocessed to remove the fission products, and the fuel can then be re-used. The fission products removed from the fuel are a concentrated form of high-level waste as are the chemicals used in the process. While most countries reprocess the fuel carrying out single plutonium cycles, India is planning multiple plutonium recycling schemes and Russia pursues closed cycle.

==== Fuel composition and long term radioactivity ====
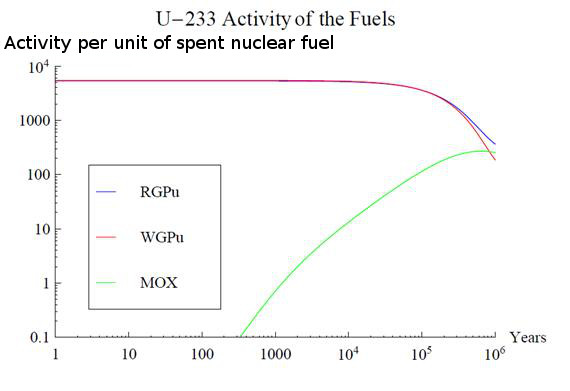
Activity of U-233 for three fuel types. In the case of MOX, the U-233 increases for the first 650 thousand years as it is produced by the decay of Np-237 which was created in the reactor by absorption of neutrons by U-235.

Total activity for three fuel types. In region 1, there is radiation from short-lived nuclides, in region 2, from Sr-90 and Cs-137, and on the far right, the decay of Np-237 and U-233.

The use of different fuels in nuclear reactors results in different spent nuclear fuel (SNF) composition, with varying activity curves. The most abundant material being U-238 with other uranium isotopes, other actinides, fission products and activation products.

Long-lived radioactive waste from the back end of the fuel cycle is especially relevant when designing a complete waste management plan for SNF. When looking at long-term radioactive decay, the actinides in the SNF have a significant influence due to their characteristically long half-lives. Depending on what a nuclear reactor is fueled with, the actinide composition in the SNF will be different.

An example of this effect is the use of nuclear fuels with thorium. Th-232 is a fertile material that can undergo a neutron capture reaction and two beta minus decays, resulting in the production of fissile U-233. The SNF of a cycle with thorium will contain U-233. Its radioactive decay will strongly influence the long-term activity curve of the SNF for around a million years. A comparison of the activity associated to U-233 for three different SNF types can be seen in the figure on the top right. The burnt fuels are thorium with reactor-grade plutonium (RGPu), thorium with weapons-grade plutonium (WGPu), and Mixed oxide fuel (MOX, no thorium). For RGPu and WGPu, the initial amount of U-233 and its decay for around a million years can be seen. This has an effect on the total activity curve of the three fuel types. The initial absence of U-233 and its daughter products in the MOX fuel results in a lower activity in region 3 of the figure at the bottom right, whereas for RGPu and WGPu the curve is maintained higher due to the presence of U-233 that has not fully decayed. Nuclear reprocessing can remove the actinides from the spent fuel so they can be used or destroyed (see Long-lived fission product § Actinides).

==== Proliferation concerns ====
Since uranium and plutonium are nuclear weapons materials, there are proliferation concerns. Ordinarily (in spent nuclear fuel), plutonium is reactor-grade plutonium. In addition to plutonium-239, which is highly suitable for building nuclear weapons, it contains large amounts of undesirable contaminants: plutonium-240, plutonium-241, and plutonium-238. These isotopes are extremely difficult to separate, and more cost-effective ways of obtaining fissile material exist (e.g., uranium enrichment or dedicated plutonium production reactors).

High-level waste is full of highly radioactive fission products, most of which are relatively short-lived. This is a concern since if the waste is stored, perhaps in deep geological storage, over many years the fission products decay, decreasing the radioactivity of the waste and making the plutonium easier to access. The undesirable contaminant Pu-240 decays faster than the Pu-239, and thus the quality of the bomb material increases with time (although its quantity decreases during that time as well). Thus, some have argued, as time passes, these deep storage areas have the potential to become "plutonium mines", from which material for nuclear weapons can be acquired with relatively little difficulty. Critics of the latter idea have pointed out the difficulty of recovering useful material from sealed deep storage areas makes other methods preferable. Specifically, high radioactivity and heat (80 °C in surrounding rock) greatly increase the difficulty of mining a storage area, and the enrichment methods required have high capital costs.

Pu-239 decays to U-235 which is suitable for weapons and which has a very long half-life (roughly 10^{9} years). Thus plutonium may decay and leave uranium-235. However, modern reactors are only moderately enriched with U-235 relative to U-238, so the U-238 continues to serve as a denaturation agent for any U-235 produced by plutonium decay.

One solution to this problem is to recycle the plutonium and use it as a fuel e.g. in fast reactors. In pyrometallurgical fast reactors, the separated plutonium and uranium are contaminated by actinides and cannot be used for nuclear weapons.

=== Nuclear weapons decommissioning ===
Waste from nuclear weapons decommissioning is unlikely to contain much beta or gamma activity other than tritium and americium. It is more likely to contain alpha-emitting actinides such as Pu-239 which is a fissile material used in nuclear bombs, plus some material with much higher specific activities, such as Pu-238 or Po.

In the past the neutron trigger for an atomic bomb tended to be beryllium and a high activity alpha emitter such as polonium; an alternative to polonium is Pu-238. For reasons of national security, details of the design of modern nuclear bombs are normally not released to the open literature.

Some designs might contain a radioisotope thermoelectric generator using Pu-238 to provide a long-lasting source of electrical power for the electronics in the device.

It is likely that the fissile material of an old nuclear bomb, which is due for refitting, will contain decay products of the plutonium isotopes used in it. These are likely to include U-236 from Pu-240 impurities plus some U-235 from decay of the Pu-239; due to the relatively long half-life of these Pu isotopes, these wastes from radioactive decay of bomb core material would be very small, and in any case, far less dangerous (even in terms of simple radioactivity) than the Pu-239 itself.

The beta decay of Pu-241 forms Am-241; the in-growth of americium is likely to be a greater problem than the decay of Pu-239 and Pu-240 as the americium is a gamma emitter (increasing external-exposure to workers) and is an alpha emitter which can cause the generation of heat. The plutonium could be separated from the americium by several different processes; these would include pyrochemical processes and aqueous/organic solvent extraction. A truncated PUREX type extraction process would be one possible method of making the separation. Naturally occurring uranium is not fissile because it contains 99.3% of U-238 and only 0.7% of U-235.

=== Legacy waste ===
Due to historic activities typically related to the radium industry, uranium mining, and military programs, numerous sites contain or are contaminated with radioactivity. In the United States alone, the Department of Energy (DOE) states there are "millions of gallons of radioactive waste" as well as "thousands of tons of spent nuclear fuel and material" and also "huge quantities of contaminated soil and water." Despite copious quantities of waste, in 2007, the DOE stated a goal of cleaning all presently contaminated sites successfully by 2025. The Fernald, Ohio site for example had "31 million pounds of uranium product", "2.5 billion pounds of waste", "2.75 million cubic yards of contaminated soil and debris", and a "223 acre portion of the underlying Great Miami Aquifer had uranium levels above drinking standards." The United States has at least 108 sites designated as areas that are contaminated and unusable, sometimes many thousands of acres. The DOE wishes to clean or mitigate many or all by 2025, using the recently developed method of geomelting, however the task can be difficult and it acknowledges that some may never be completely remediated. In just one of these 108 larger designations, Oak Ridge National Laboratory (ORNL), there were for example at least "167 known contaminant release sites" in one of the three subdivisions of the 37,000-acre (150 km^{2}) site. Some of the U.S. sites were smaller in nature, however, cleanup problems were simpler to address, and the DOE has successfully completed cleanup, or at least closure, of several sites.

=== Medicine ===
Radioactive medical waste tends to contain beta particle and gamma ray emitters. It can be divided into two main classes. In diagnostic nuclear medicine a number of short-lived gamma emitters such as technetium-99m are used. Many of these can be disposed of by leaving it to decay for a short time before disposal as normal waste. Other isotopes used in medicine, with half-lives in parentheses, include:

- Y-90, used for treating lymphoma (2.7 days)
- I-131, used for thyroid function tests and for treating thyroid cancer (8.0 days)
- Sr-89, used for treating bone cancer, intravenous injection (52 days)
- Ir-192, used for brachytherapy (74 days)
- Co-60, used for brachytherapy and external radiotherapy (5.3 years)
- Cs-137, used for brachytherapy and external radiotherapy (30 years)
- Tc-99, product of the decay of technetium-99m (221,000 years)

=== Industry ===
Industrial source waste can contain alpha, beta, neutron or gamma emitters. Gamma emitters are used in radiography while neutron emitting sources are used in a range of applications, such as oil well logging.

=== Naturally occurring radioactive material ===
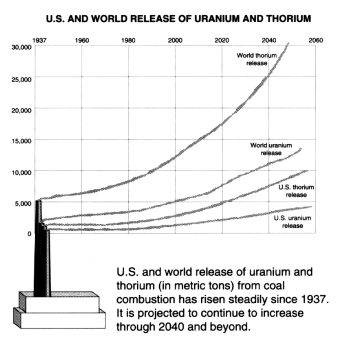
Annual release of uranium and thorium radioisotopes from coal combustion, predicted by ORNL in 1993 to cumulatively amount to 2.9 Mt over the 1937–2040 period, from the combustion of an estimated 637 Gt of coal worldwide.

Substances containing natural radioactivity are known as NORM (naturally occurring radioactive material). After human processing that exposes or concentrates this natural radioactivity (such as mining bringing coal to the surface or burning it to produce concentrated ash), it becomes technologically enhanced naturally occurring radioactive material (TENORM). Much of this waste is alpha particle-emitting matter from the decay chains of uranium and thorium. The main source of radiation in the human body is potassium-40 (^{40}K), typically 17 milligrams in the body at a time and 0.4 milligrams/day intake. Most rocks, especially granite, have a low level of radioactivity due to the potassium-40, thorium and uranium contained.

Usually ranging from 1 millisievert (mSv) to 13 mSv annually depending on location, average radiation exposure from natural radioisotopes is 2.0 mSv per person a year worldwide. This makes up the majority of typical total dosage (with mean annual exposure from other sources amounting to 0.6 mSv from medical tests averaged over the whole populace, 0.4 mSv from cosmic rays, 0.005 mSv from the legacy of past atmospheric nuclear testing, 0.005 mSv occupational exposure, 0.002 mSv from the Chernobyl disaster, and 0.0002 mSv from the nuclear fuel cycle).

TENORM is not regulated as restrictively as nuclear reactor waste, though there are no significant differences in the radiological risks of these materials.

==== Coal ====
Coal contains a small amount of radioactive uranium, barium, thorium, and potassium, but, in the case of pure coal, this is significantly less than the average concentration of those elements in the Earth's crust. The surrounding strata, if shale or mudstone, often contain slightly more than average and this may also be reflected in the ash content of 'dirty' coals. The more active ash minerals become concentrated in the fly ash precisely because they do not burn well. The radioactivity of fly ash is about the same as black shale and is less than phosphate rocks, but is more of a concern because a small amount of the fly ash ends up in the atmosphere where it can be inhaled. According to U.S. National Council on Radiation Protection and Measurements (NCRP) reports, population exposure from 1000-MWe power plants amounts to 490 person-rem/year for coal power plants, 100 times as great as nuclear power plants (4.8 person-rem/year). The exposure from the complete nuclear fuel cycle from mining to waste disposal is 136 person-rem/year; the corresponding value for coal use from mining to waste disposal is "probably unknown".

==== Oil and gas ====
Residues from the oil and gas industry often contain radium and its decay products. The sulfate scale from an oil well can be radium rich, while the water, oil, and gas from a well often contain radon. The radon decays to form solid radioisotopes which form coatings on the inside of pipework. In an oil processing plant, the area of the plant where propane is processed is often one of the more contaminated areas of the plant as radon has a similar boiling point to propane.

Radioactive elements are an industrial problem in some oil wells where workers operating in direct contact with the crude oil and brine can be exposed to doses having negative health effects. Due to the relatively high concentration of these elements in the brine, its disposal is also a technological challenge. Since the 1980s, in the United States, the brine is however exempt from the dangerous waste regulations and can be disposed of regardless of radioactive or toxic substances content.

==== Rare-earth mining ====
Due to natural occurrence of radioactive elements such as thorium and radium in rare-earth ore, mining operations also result in production of waste and mineral deposits that are slightly radioactive.

== Classification ==
Classification of radioactive waste varies by country. The IAEA, which publishes the Radioactive Waste Safety Standards (RADWASS), also plays a significant role. The proportion (by volume) of various types of waste generated in the UK are:

- 94% – low-level waste (LLW)
- ~6% – intermediate-level waste (ILW)
- <1% – high-level waste (HLW)

=== Mill tailings ===
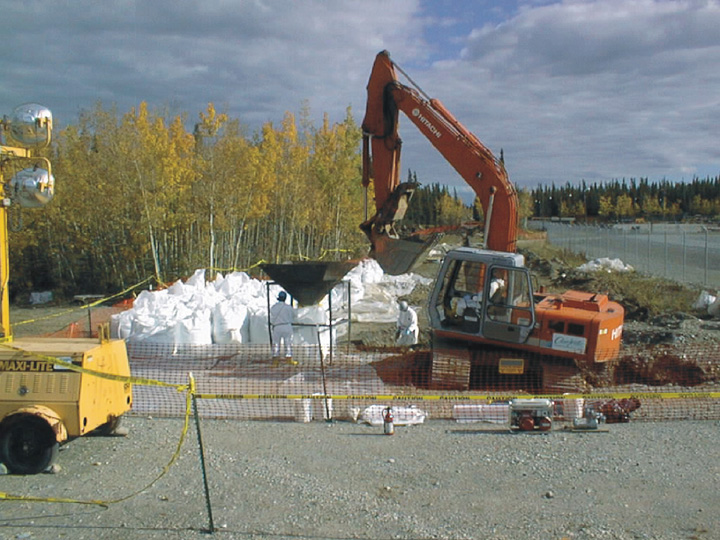
Removal of very low-level waste

Uranium tailings are waste by-product materials left over from the rough processing of uranium-bearing ore. They are not significantly radioactive. Mill tailings are sometimes referred to as 11(e)2 wastes, from the section of the US Atomic Energy Act of 1946 that defines them. Uranium mill tailings typically also contain chemically hazardous heavy metal such as lead and arsenic. Vast mounds of uranium mill tailings are left at many old mining sites, especially in Colorado, New Mexico, and Utah.

Although mill tailings are not very radioactive, they have long half-lives. Mill tailings often contain radium, thorium and trace amounts of uranium.

=== Low-level waste ===
Low-level waste (LLW) is generated from hospitals and industry, as well as the nuclear fuel cycle. Low-level wastes include paper, rags, tools, clothing, filters, and other materials which contain small amounts of mostly short-lived radioactivity. Materials that originate from any region of an active area are commonly designated as LLW as a precautionary measure even if there is only a remote possibility of being contaminated with radioactive materials. Such LLW typically exhibits no higher radioactivity than one would expect from the same material disposed of in a non-active area, such as a normal office block. Example LLW includes wiping rags, mops, medical tubes, laboratory animal carcasses, and more. LLW makes up 94% of all radioactive waste volume in the UK. Most of it is disposed of in Cumbria, first in landfill style trenches, and now using grouted metal containers that are stacked in concrete vaults. A new site in the north of Scotland is the Dounreay site which is prepared to withstand a 4m tsunami.

Some high-activity LLW requires shielding during handling and transport but most LLW is suitable for shallow land burial. To reduce its volume, it is often compacted or incinerated before disposal. Low-level waste is divided into four classes: class A, class B, class C, and Greater Than Class C (GTCC).

=== Intermediate-level waste ===
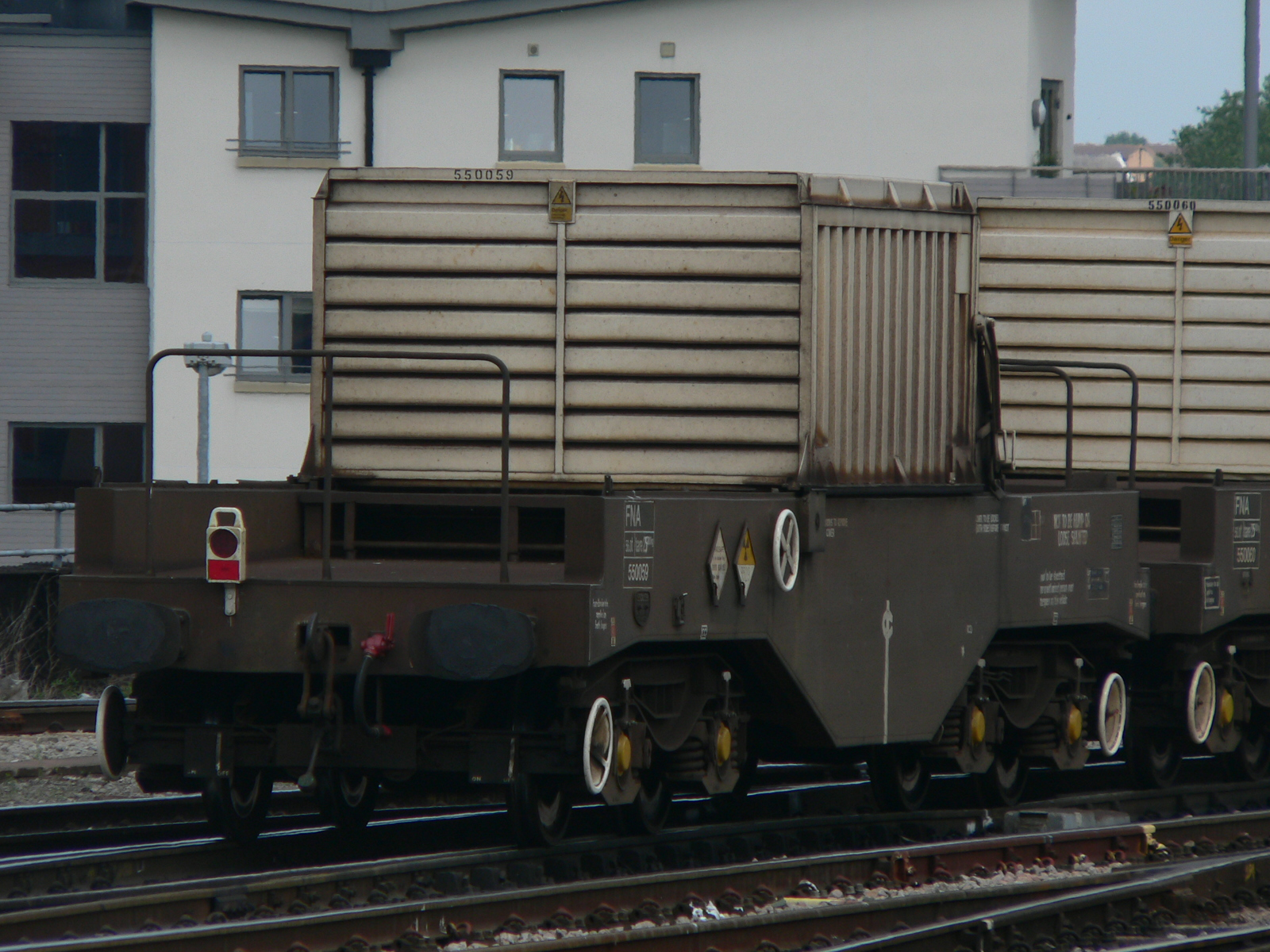
Spent fuel flasks are transported by railway in the United Kingdom. Each flask is constructed of 14 in (360 mm) thick solid steel and weighs in excess of 50 tonnes.

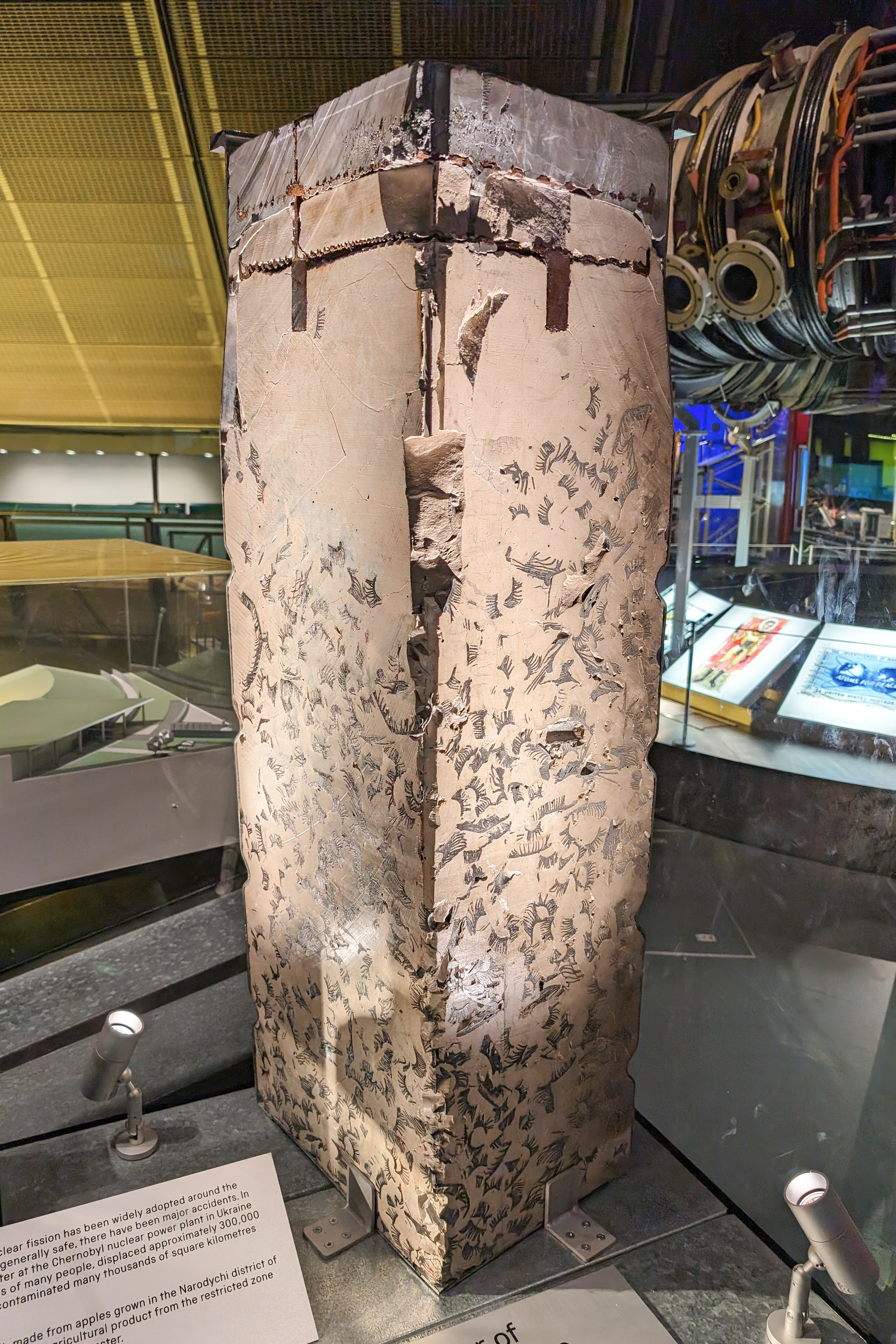
Cross-section of an intermediate-level waste canister, showing (simulated) waste encapsulated in concrete

Intermediate-level waste (ILW) contains higher amounts of radioactivity compared to low-level waste. It generally requires shielding, but not cooling. Intermediate-level wastes includes resins, chemical sludge and metal nuclear fuel cladding, as well as contaminated materials from reactor decommissioning. It may be solidified in concrete or bitumen or mixed with silica sand and vitrified for disposal. As a general rule, short-lived waste (mainly non-fuel materials from reactors) is buried in shallow repositories, while long-lived waste (from fuel and fuel reprocessing) is deposited in geological repository. Regulations in the United States do not define this category of waste; the term is used in Europe and elsewhere. ILW makes up 6% of all radioactive waste volume in the UK.

=== High-level waste ===
High-level waste (HLW) is produced by nuclear reactors and the reprocessing of nuclear fuel. The exact definition of HLW differs internationally. After a nuclear fuel rod serves one fuel cycle and is removed from the core, it is considered HLW. Spent fuel rods contain mostly uranium with fission products and transuranic elements generated in the reactor core. Spent fuel is highly radioactive and often hot. HLW accounts for over 95% of the total radioactivity produced in the process of nuclear electricity generation but it contributes to less than 1% of volume of all radioactive waste produced in the UK. Overall, the 60-year-long nuclear program in the UK up until 2019 produced 2150 m^{3} of HLW.

The radioactive waste from spent fuel rods consists primarily of cesium-137 and strontium-90, but it may also include plutonium, which can be considered transuranic waste. The half-lives of these radioactive elements can differ quite extremely. Some elements, such as cesium-137 and strontium-90 have half-lives of approximately 30 years. Meanwhile, plutonium has a half-life that can stretch to as long as 24,000 years.

The amount of HLW worldwide is increasing by about 12,000 tonnes per year. A 1000-megawatt nuclear power plant produces about 27 tonnes of spent nuclear fuel (unreprocessed) every year. For comparison, the amount of ash produced by coal power plants in the United States is estimated at 130,000,000 t per year and fly ash is estimated to release 100 times more radiation than an equivalent nuclear power plant.

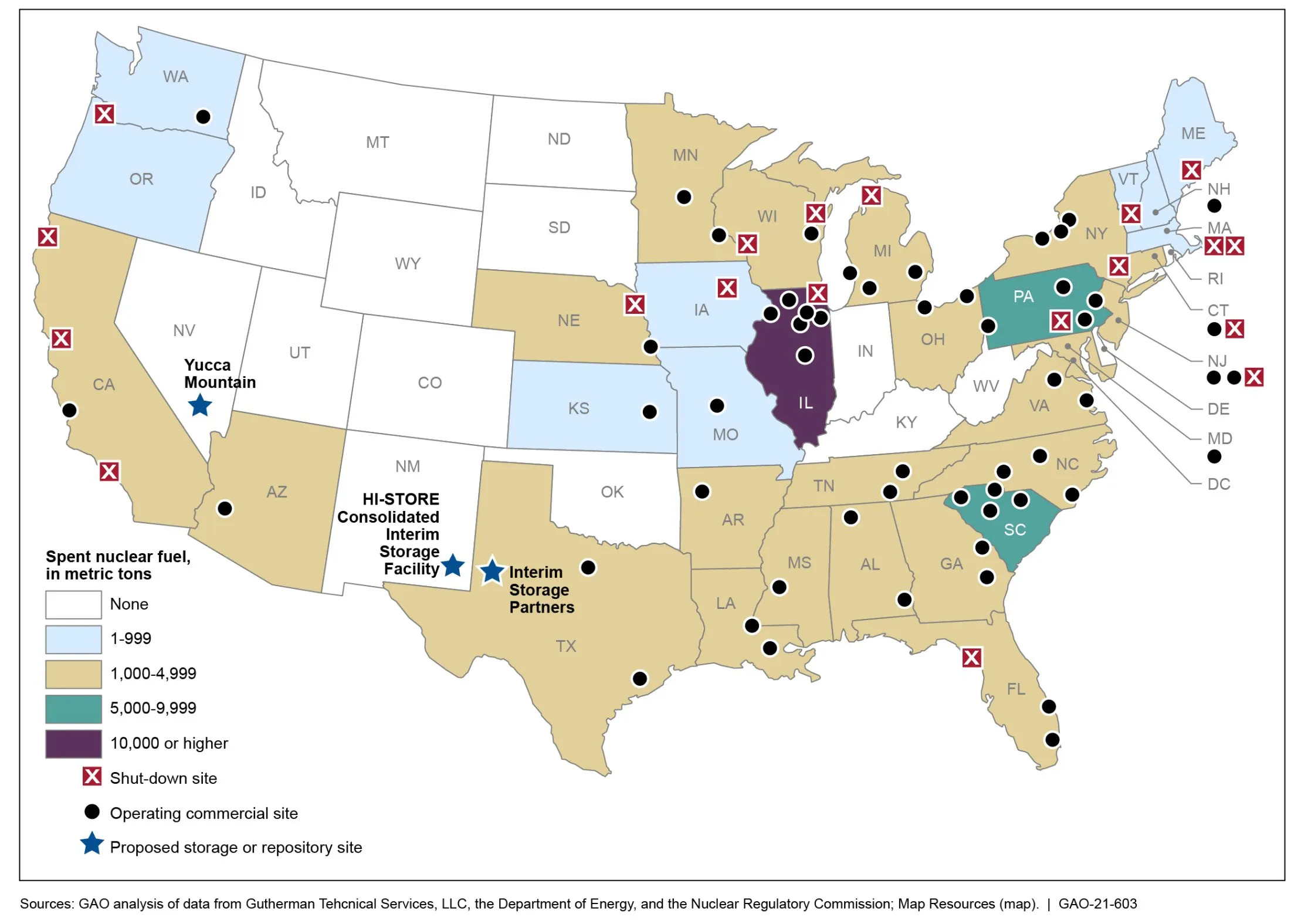
Locations across the United States where nuclear waste is stored

In 2010, it was estimated that about 250,000 t of nuclear HLW were stored globally. This does not include amounts that have escaped into the environment from accidents or tests. Japan is estimated to hold 17,000 t of HLW in storage in 2015. As of 2019, the United States has over 90,000 t of HLW. HLW have been shipped to other countries to be stored or reprocessed and, in some cases, shipped back as active fuel.

The ongoing controversy over high-level radioactive waste disposal is a major constraint on nuclear power global expansion. Most scientists agree that the main proposed long-term solution is deep geological burial, either in a mine or a deep borehole. As of 2019, no dedicated civilian high-level nuclear waste site is operational as small amounts of HLW did not justify the investment in the past. Finland is in the advanced stage of the construction of the Onkalo spent nuclear fuel repository, which is planned to open in 2025 at 400–450 m depth. France is in the planning phase for a 500 m deep Cigeo facility in Bure. Sweden is planning a site in Forsmark. Canada plans a 680 m deep facility near Lake Huron in Ontario. The Republic of Korea plans to open a site around 2028. The site in Sweden enjoys 80% support from local residents as of 2020.

The Morris Operation in Grundy County, Illinois, is currently the only de facto high-level radioactive waste storage site in the United States.

=== Transuranic waste ===
Transuranic waste (TRUW) as defined by U.S. regulations is, without regard to form or origin, waste that is contaminated with alpha-emitting transuranic radionuclides with half-lives greater than 20 years and concentrations greater than 100 nCi/g (3.7 MBq/kg), excluding high-level waste. Elements that have an atomic number greater than uranium are called transuranic ("beyond uranium"). Because of their long half-lives, TRUW is disposed of more cautiously than either low- or intermediate-level waste. In the United States, it arises mainly from nuclear weapons production, and consists of clothing, tools, rags, residues, debris, and other items contaminated with small amounts of radioactive elements (mainly plutonium).

Under U.S. law, transuranic waste is further categorized into "contact-handled" (CH) and "remote-handled" (RH) on the basis of the radiation dose rate measured at the surface of the waste container. CH TRUW has a surface dose rate not greater than 200 mrem per hour (2 mSv/h), whereas RH TRUW has a surface dose rate of 200 mrem/h (2 mSv/h) or greater. CH TRUW does not have the very high radioactivity of high-level waste, nor its high heat generation, but RH TRUW can be highly radioactive, with surface dose rates up to 1,000,000 mrem/h (10,000 mSv/h). The United States currently disposes of TRUW generated from military facilities at the Waste Isolation Pilot Plant (WIPP) in a deep salt formation in New Mexico.

== Prevention ==
A future way to reduce waste accumulation is to phase out current reactors in favor of Generation IV reactors, which output less waste per power generated. Fast reactors such as BN-800 in Russia are also able to consume MOX fuel that is manufactured from recycled spent fuel from traditional reactors.

The UK's Nuclear Decommissioning Authority published a position paper in 2014 on the progress on approaches to the management of separated plutonium, which summarises the conclusions of the work that the NDA shared with the UK government.

== Management ==
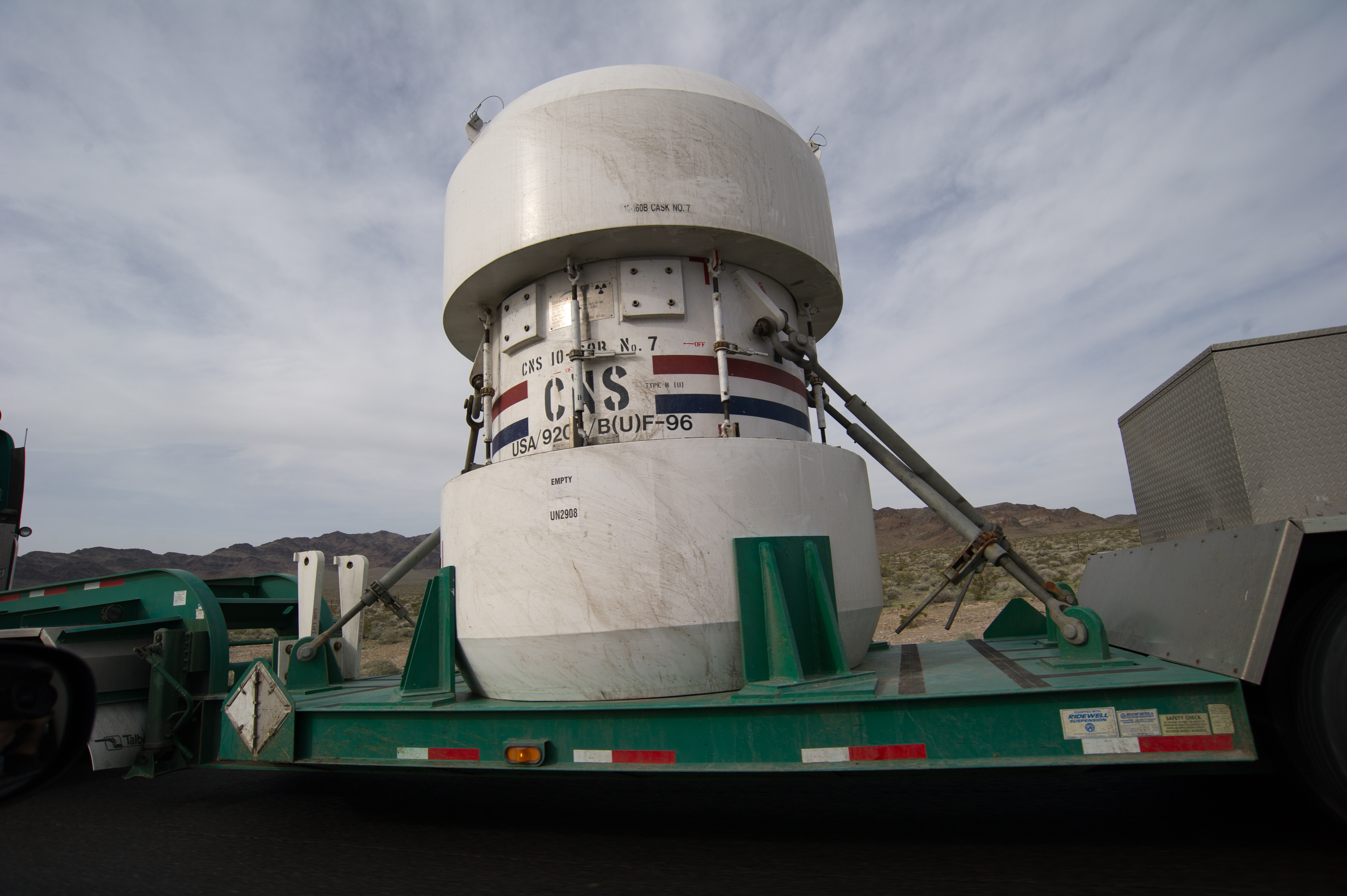
Modern medium- to high-level transport container for nuclear waste

Of particular concern in nuclear waste management are two long-lived fission products, Tc-99 (half-life 220,000 years) and I-129 (half-life 15.7 million years), which dominate spent fuel radioactivity after a few thousand years. The most troublesome transuranic elements in spent fuel are Np-237 (half-life two million years) and Pu-239 (half-life 24,000 years). Nuclear waste requires sophisticated treatment and management to successfully isolate it from interacting with the biosphere. This usually necessitates treatment, followed by a long-term management strategy involving storage, disposal or transformation of the waste into a non-toxic form. Governments around the world are considering a range of waste management and disposal options, though there has been limited progress toward long-term waste management solutions.

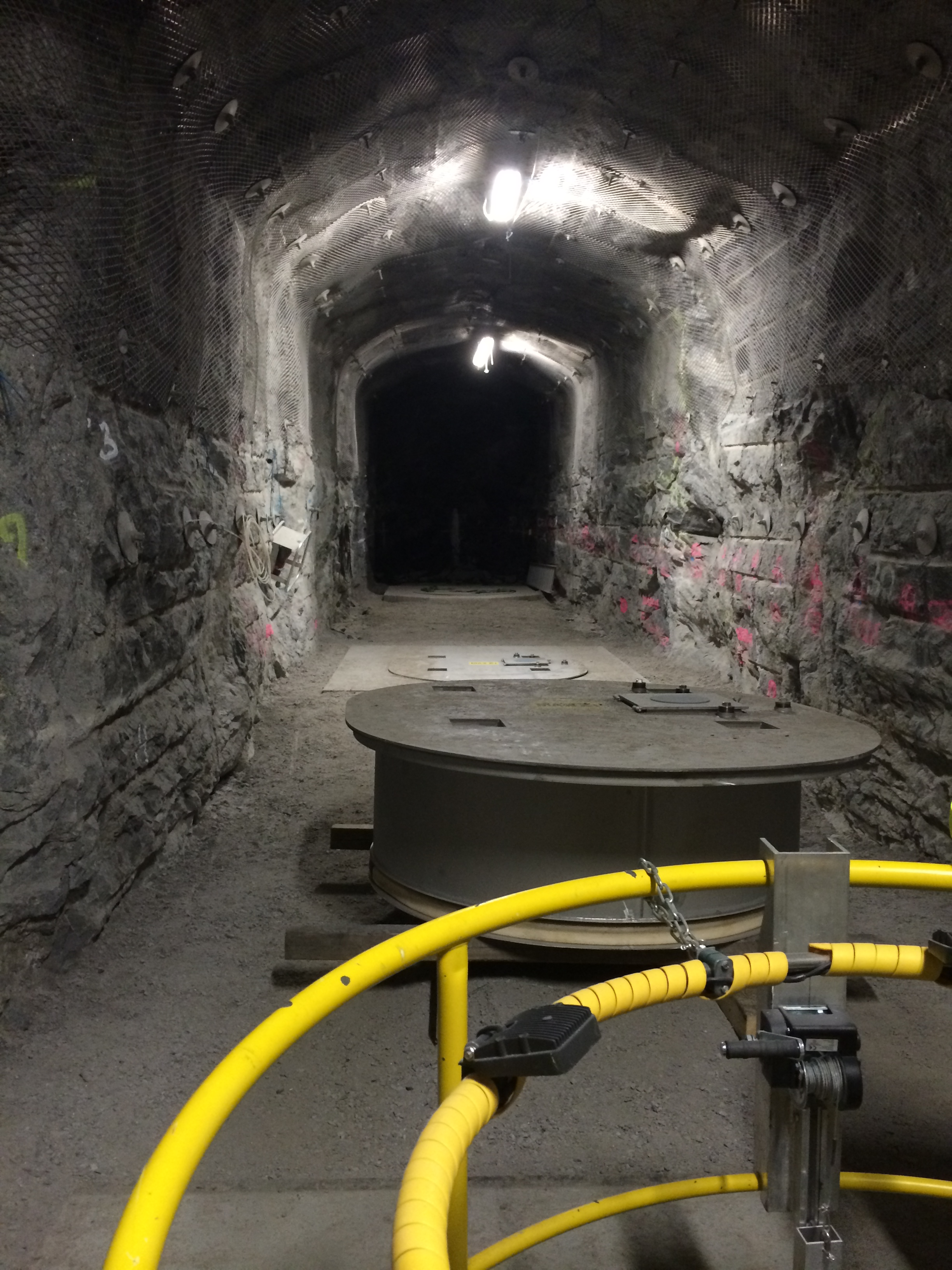
The Onkalo is a planned deep geological repository for the final disposal of spent nuclear fuel near the Olkiluoto Nuclear Power Plant in Eurajoki, on the west coast of Finland. Picture of a pilot cave at final depth in Onkalo.

Several methods of disposal of radioactive waste have been investigated:

- Deep geological repository
- Dry cask storage
- Deep borehole disposal – not implemented.
- Rock melting – not implemented.
- Ocean disposal – used by the USSR, the United Kingdom, Switzerland, the United States, Belgium, France, the Netherlands, Japan, Sweden, Russia, Germany, Italy and South Korea (1954–1993). This is no longer permitted by international agreements.
- Disposal in ice sheets – rejected in Antarctic Treaty.
- Deep well injection – used by USSR and USA.
- Nuclear transmutation, using neutron capture to convert the unstable atoms to those with shorter half-lives.
- Nuclear reprocessing such as the PUREX process allows for reuse of some radioactive materials.
- Disposal in outer space – not implemented as too expensive.

In the United States, waste management policy broke down with the ending of work on the incomplete Yucca Mountain Repository. At present there are 70 nuclear power plant sites where spent fuel is stored. A Blue Ribbon Commission was appointed by U.S. President Obama to look into future options for this and future waste. A deep geological repository seems to be favored.

Ducrete, Saltcrete, and Synroc are methods for immobilizing nuclear waste.

Maritime transport of radioactive waste on ships is regulated at sea by the INF Code.

=== Initial treatment ===
==== Vitrification ====
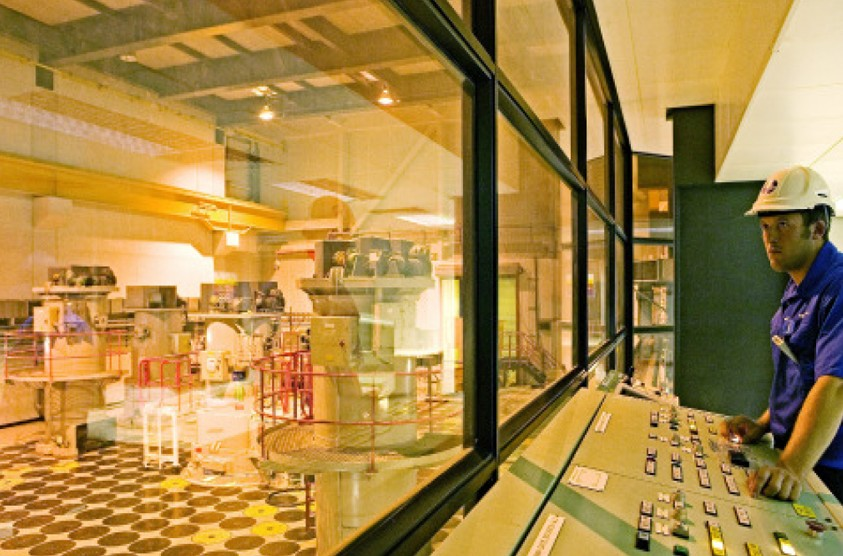
The Waste Vitrification Plant at Sellafield

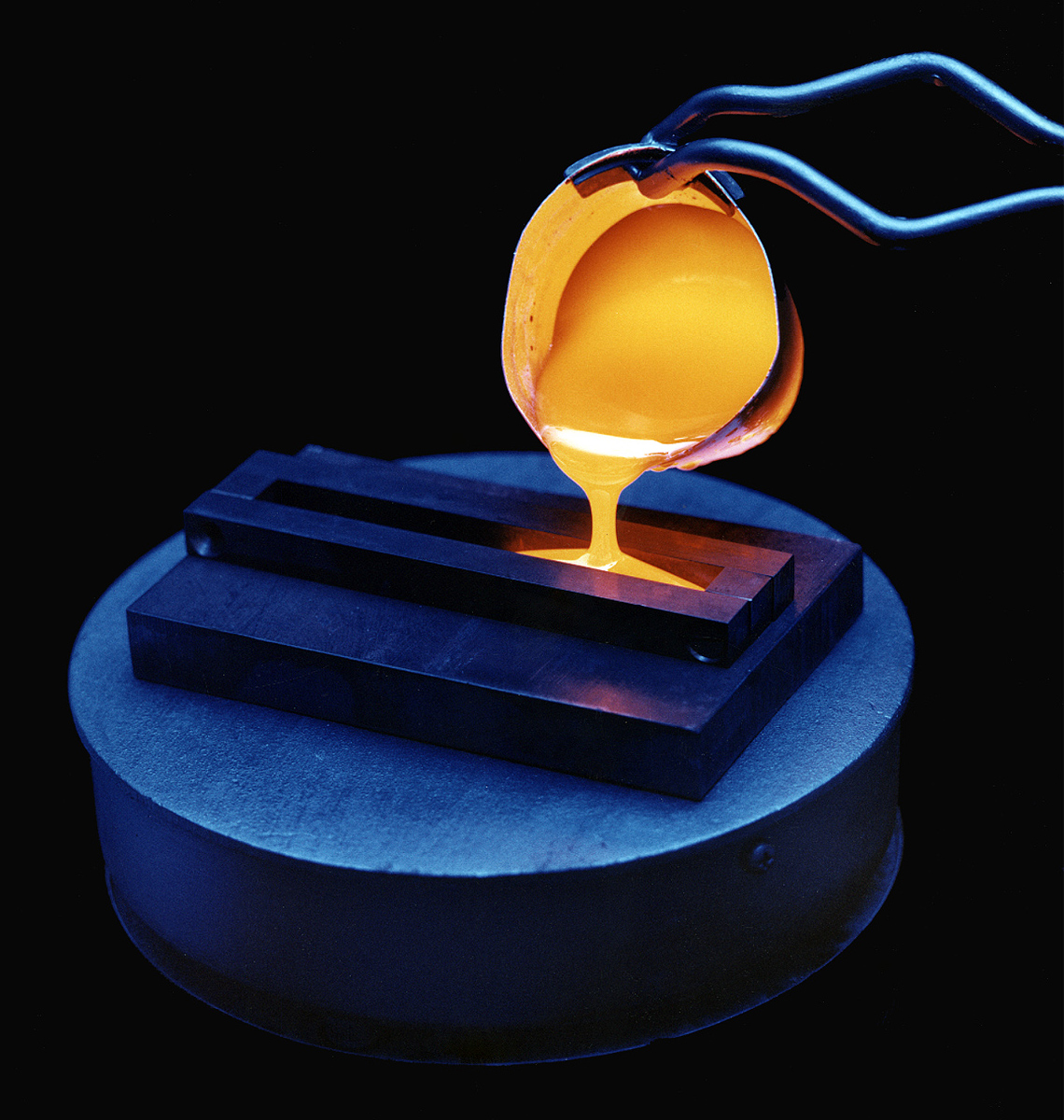
Vitrification of waste into glass for long term storage.

Long-term storage of radioactive waste requires the stabilization of the waste into a form that will neither react nor degrade for extended periods. It is theorized that one way to do this might be through vitrification. Currently at Sellafield, the high-level waste (PUREX first cycle raffinate) is mixed with sugar and then calcined. Calcination involves passing the waste through a heated, rotating tube. The purposes of calcination are to evaporate the water from the waste and de-nitrate the fission products to assist the stability of the glass produced.

The 'calcine' generated is fed continuously into an induction heated furnace with fragmented glass. The resulting glass is a new substance in which the waste products are bonded into the glass matrix when it solidifies. As a melt, this product is poured into stainless steel cylindrical containers ("cylinders") in a batch process. When cooled, the fluid solidifies ("vitrifies") into the glass. After being formed, the glass is highly resistant to water.

After filling a cylinder, a seal is welded onto the cylinder head. The cylinder is then washed. After being inspected for external contamination, the steel cylinder is stored, usually in an underground repository. In this form, the waste products are expected to be immobilized for thousands of years.

The glass inside a cylinder is usually a black glossy substance. All this work (in the United Kingdom) is done using hot cell systems. Sugar is added to control the ruthenium chemistry and to stop the formation of the volatile RuO_{4} containing radioactive ruthenium isotopes. In the West, the glass is normally a borosilicate glass (similar to Pyrex), while in the former Soviet Union it is normal to use a phosphate glass. The amount of fission products in the glass must be limited because some (palladium, the other Pt group metals, and tellurium) tend to form metallic phases which separate from the glass. Bulk vitrification uses electrodes to melt soil and wastes, which are then buried underground. In Germany, a vitrification plant is treating the waste from a small demonstration reprocessing plant which has since been closed.

==== Phosphate ceramics ====
Another way to stabilize the waste into a form that will not react or degrade for extended periods is immobilization via direct incorporation into a phosphate-based crystalline ceramic host. The diverse chemistry of phosphate ceramics under various conditions demonstrates a versatile material that can withstand chemical, thermal, and radioactive degradation over time. The properties of phosphates, particularly ceramic phosphates, of stability over a wide pH range, low porosity, and minimization of secondary waste introduces possibilities for new waste immobilization techniques.

==== Ion exchange ====
It is common for medium active wastes in the nuclear industry to be treated with ion exchange or other means to concentrate the radioactivity into a small volume. The much less radioactive bulk (after treatment) is often then discharged. For instance, it is possible to use a ferric hydroxide floc to remove radioactive metals from aqueous mixtures. After the radioisotopes are absorbed onto the ferric hydroxide, the resulting sludge can be placed in a metal drum before being mixed with cement to form solid waste. In order to get better long-term performance (mechanical stability) from such forms, they may be made from a mixture of fly ash, or blast furnace slag, and portland cement, instead of normal concrete (made with portland cement, gravel and sand).

==== Synroc ====
The Australian Synroc (synthetic rock) is a more sophisticated way to immobilize such waste, and this process may eventually come into commercial use for civil wastes (it is currently being developed for U.S. military wastes). Synroc was invented by Ted Ringwood, a geochemist at the Australian National University. The Synroc contains pyrochlore and cryptomelane type minerals. The original form of Synroc (Synroc C) was designed for the liquid high-level waste (PUREX raffinate) from a light-water reactor. The main minerals in this Synroc are hollandite (BaAl_{2}Ti_{6}O_{16}), zirconolite (CaZrTi_{2}O_{7}) and perovskite (CaTiO_{3}). The zirconolite and perovskite are hosts for the actinides. The strontium and barium will be fixed in the perovskite. The caesium will be fixed in the hollandite. A Synroc waste treatment facility began construction in 2018 at ANSTO.

=== Long-term management ===
The time frame in question when dealing with radioactive waste ranges from 10,000 to 1,000,000 years, according to studies based on the effect of estimated radiation doses. Researchers suggest that forecasts of health detriment for such periods should be examined critically. Practical studies only consider up to 100 years as far as effective planning and cost evaluations are concerned. Long term behavior of radioactive wastes remains a subject for ongoing research projects in geoforecasting.

==== Remediation ====
Algae has shown selectivity for strontium in studies, where most plants used in bioremediation have not shown selectivity between calcium and strontium, often becoming saturated with calcium, which is present in greater quantities in nuclear waste. Strontium-90 with a half-life around 30 years, is classified as high-level waste.

Researchers have looked at the bioaccumulation of strontium by Scenedesmus spinosus (algae) in simulated wastewater. The study claims a highly selective biosorption capacity for strontium of S. spinosus, suggesting that it may be appropriate for use of nuclear wastewater. A study of the pond alga Closterium moniliferum using non-radioactive strontium found that varying the ratio of barium to strontium in water improved strontium selectivity.

==== Above-ground disposal ====
Dry cask storage typically involves taking waste from a spent fuel pool and sealing it (along with an inert gas) in a steel cylinder, which is placed in a concrete cylinder which acts as a radiation shield. It is a relatively inexpensive method which can be done at a central facility or adjacent to the source reactor. The waste can be easily retrieved for reprocessing.

==== Geologic disposal ====
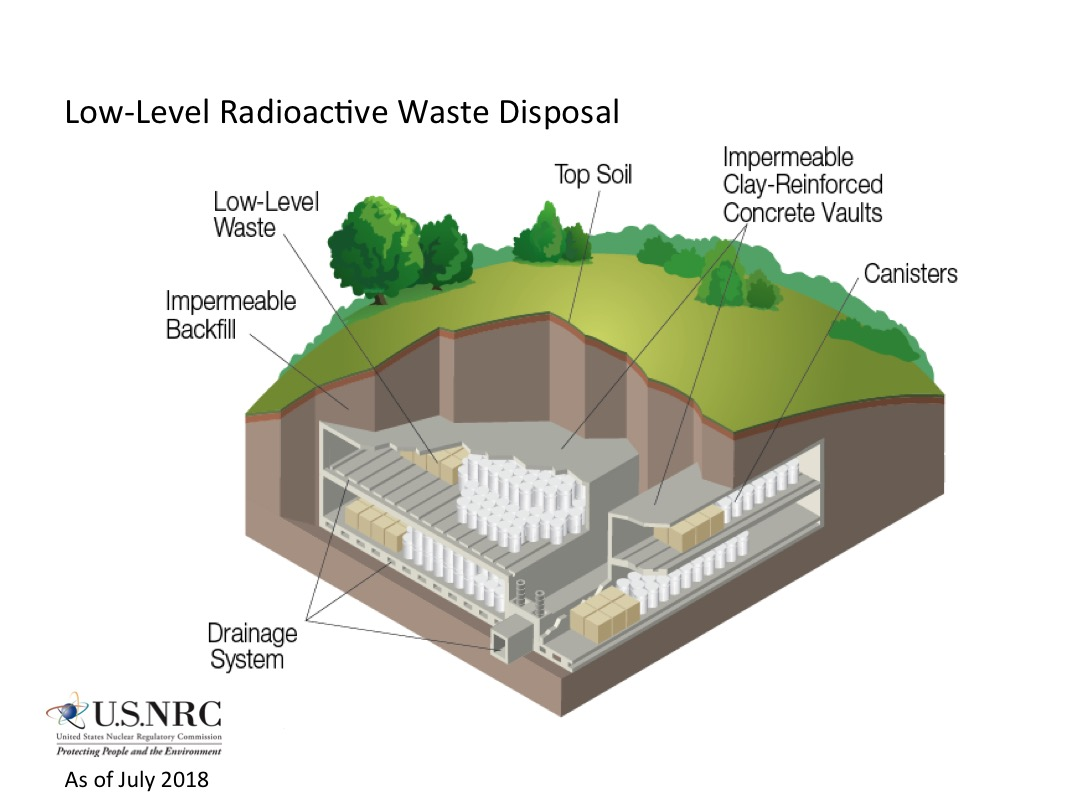
Diagram of an underground low-level radioactive waste disposal site

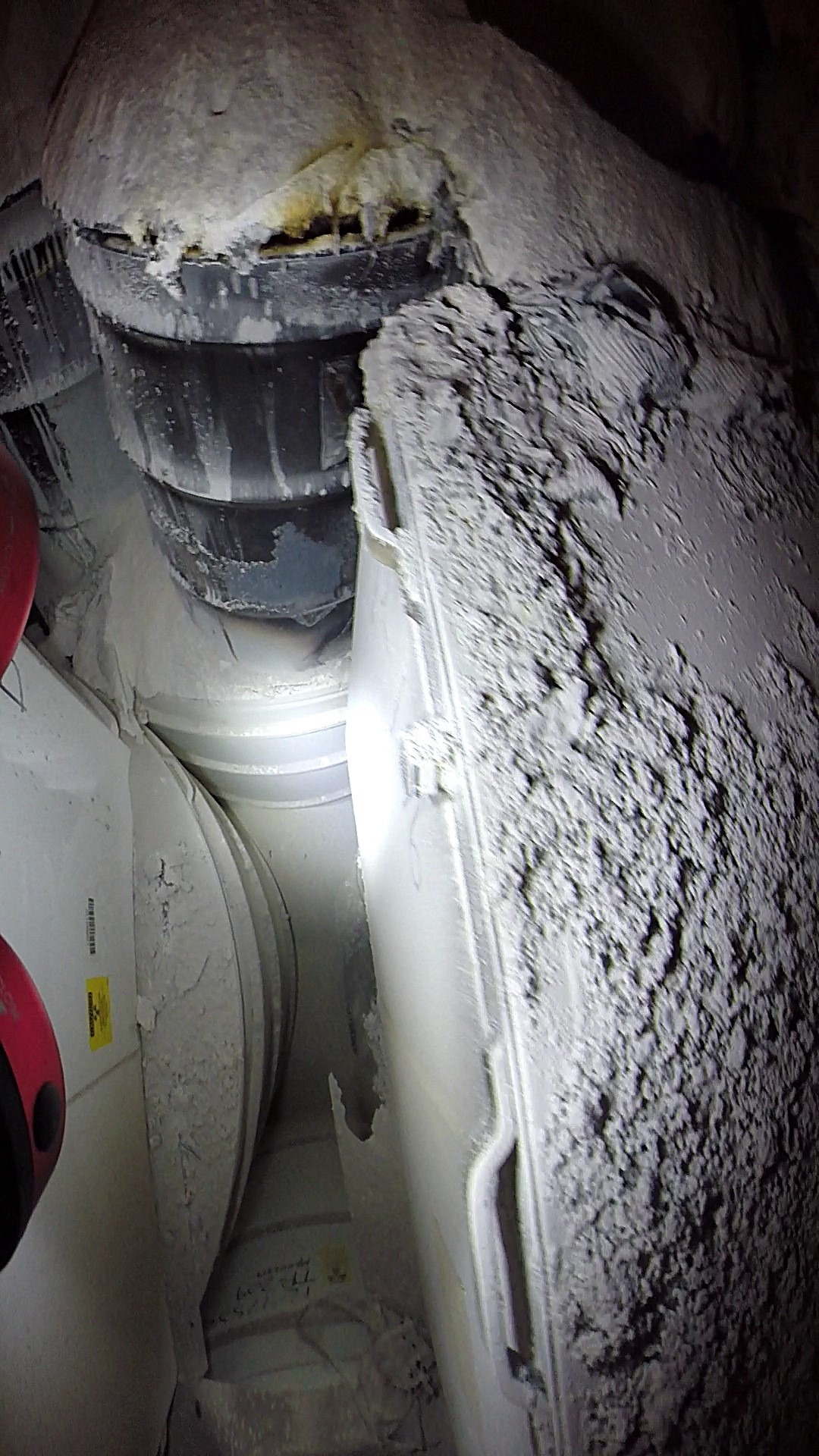
On Feb. 14, 2014, radioactive materials at the Waste Isolation Pilot Plant leaked from a damaged storage drum due to the use of incorrect packing material. Analysis showed the lack of a "safety culture" at the plant since its successful operation for 15 years had bred complacency.

The process of selecting appropriate deep final repositories for high-level waste and spent fuel is now underway in several countries with the first expected to be commissioned sometime after 2010. The basic concept is to locate a large, stable geologic formation and use mining technology to excavate a tunnel, or use large-bore tunnel boring machines (similar to those used to drill the Channel Tunnel from England to France) to drill a shaft 500 to 1,000 metres (1,600 to 3,300 ft) below the surface where rooms or vaults can be excavated for disposal of high-level radioactive waste. The goal is to permanently isolate nuclear waste from the human environment. Many people remain uncomfortable with the immediate stewardship cessation of this disposal system, suggesting perpetual management and monitoring would be more prudent.

Because some radioactive species have half-lives longer than one million years, even very low container leakage and radionuclide migration rates must be taken into account. Moreover, it may require more than one half-life until some nuclear materials lose enough radioactivity to cease being lethal to living things. A 1983 review of the Swedish radioactive waste disposal program by the National Academy of Sciences found that country's estimate of several hundred thousand years—perhaps up to one million years—being necessary for waste isolation "fully justified."

The proposed land-based subductive waste disposal method disposes of nuclear waste in a subduction zone accessed from land and therefore is not prohibited by international agreement. This method has been described as the most viable means of disposing of radioactive waste, and as the state-of-the-art as of 2001 in nuclear waste disposal technology.

Another approach termed Remix & Return would blend high-level waste with uranium mine and mill tailings down to the level of the original radioactivity of the uranium ore, then replace it in inactive uranium mines. This approach has the merits of providing jobs for miners who would double as disposal staff, and of facilitating a cradle-to-grave cycle for radioactive materials, but would be inappropriate for spent reactor fuel in the absence of reprocessing, due to the presence of highly toxic radioactive elements such as plutonium within it.

Deep borehole disposal is the concept of disposing of high-level radioactive waste from nuclear reactors in extremely deep boreholes. Deep borehole disposal seeks to place the waste as much as 5 kilometres (3.1 mi) beneath the surface of the Earth and relies primarily on the immense natural geological barrier to confine the waste safely and permanently so that it should never pose a threat to the environment. The Earth's crust contains 120 trillion tons of thorium and 40 trillion tons of uranium (primarily at relatively trace concentrations of parts per million each adding up over the crust's 3 × 10^{19} ton mass), among other natural radioisotopes. Since the fraction of nuclides decaying per unit of time is inversely proportional to an isotope's half-life, the relative radioactivity of the lesser amount of human-produced radioisotopes (thousands of tons instead of trillions of tons) would diminish once the isotopes with far shorter half-lives than the bulk of natural radioisotopes decayed.

In January 2013, Cumbria county council rejected UK central government proposals to start work on an underground storage dump for nuclear waste near to the Lake District National Park. "For any host community, there will be a substantial community benefits package and worth hundreds of millions of pounds" said Ed Davey, Energy Secretary, but nonetheless, the local elected body voted 7–3 against research continuing, after hearing evidence from independent geologists that "the fractured strata of the county was impossible to entrust with such dangerous material and a hazard lasting millennia."

Horizontal drillhole disposal describes proposals to drill over one km vertically, and two km horizontally in the earth's crust, for the purpose of disposing of high-level waste forms such as spent nuclear fuel, Caesium-137, or Strontium-90. After the emplacement and the retrievability period, drillholes would be backfilled and sealed. A series of tests of the technology were carried out in November 2018 and then again publicly in January 2019 by a U.S. based private company. The test demonstrated the emplacement of a test-canister in a horizontal drillhole and retrieval of the same canister. There was no actual high-level waste used in the test.

The European Commission Joint Research Centre report of 2021 (see above) concluded:

Management of radioactive waste and its safe and secure disposal is a necessary step in the lifecycle of all applications of nuclear science and technology (nuclear energy, research, industry, education, medical, and others). Radioactive waste is therefore generated in practically every country, the largest contribution coming from the nuclear energy lifecycle in countries operating nuclear power plants. Presently, there is broad scientific and technical consensus that disposal of high-level, long-lived radioactive waste in deep geologic formations is, at the state of today’s knowledge, considered as an appropriate and safe means of isolating it from the biosphere for very long time scales.

==== Ocean floor disposal ====
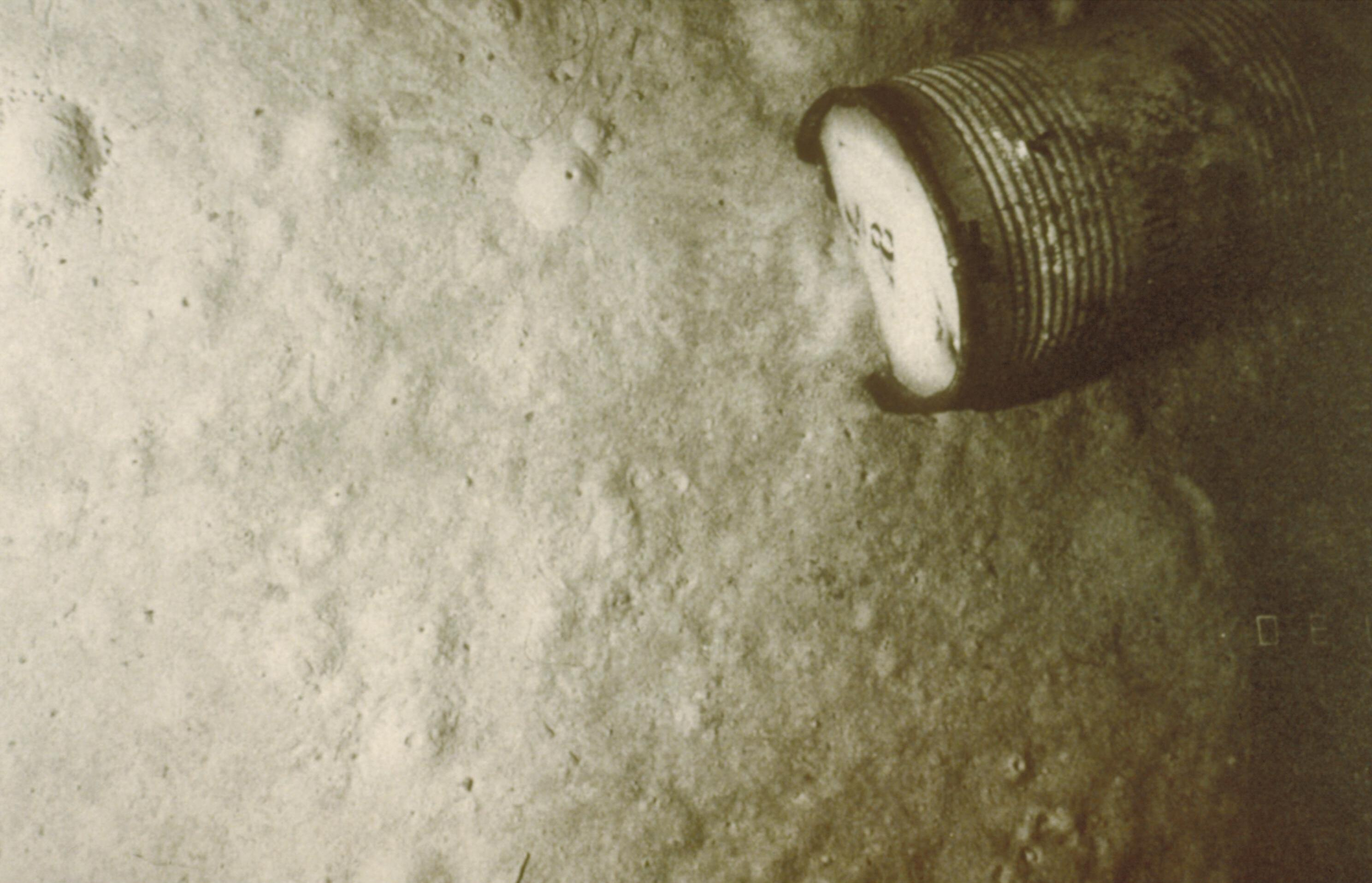
A drum of low-level radioactive waste in the North-East Atlantic dumping zone (NEA zone), between 4,500 and 4,700 m deep.

From 1946 through 1993, thirteen countries used ocean disposal or ocean dumping as a method to dispose of nuclear/radioactive waste with an approximation of 200,000 tons sourcing mainly from the medical, research and nuclear industry.

Ocean floor disposal of radioactive waste has been suggested by the finding that deep waters in the North Atlantic Ocean do not present an exchange with shallow waters for about 140 years based on oxygen content data recorded over a period of 25 years. They include burial beneath a stable abyssal plain, burial in a subduction zone that would slowly carry the waste downward into the Earth's mantle, and burial beneath a remote natural or human-made island. While these approaches all have merit and would facilitate an international solution to the problem of disposal of radioactive waste, they would require an amendment of the Law of the Sea.

Nuclear submarines have been lost and these vessels reactors must also be counted in the amount of radioactive waste deposited at sea.

Article 1 (Definitions), 7., of the 1996 Protocol to the Convention on the Prevention of Marine Pollution by Dumping of Wastes and Other Matter, (the London Dumping Convention) states:

""Sea" means all marine waters other than the internal waters of States, as well as the seabed and the subsoil thereof; it does not include sub-seabed repositories accessed only from land."

==== Transmutation ====
There have been proposals for reactors that consume nuclear waste and transmute it to other, less-harmful or shorter-lived, nuclear waste. In particular, the integral fast reactor was a proposed nuclear reactor with a nuclear fuel cycle that produced no transuranic waste and, in fact, could consume transuranic waste. It proceeded as far as large-scale tests but was eventually canceled by the U.S. Government. Another approach, considered safer but requiring more development, is to dedicate subcritical reactors to the transmutation of the left-over transuranic elements.

An isotope that is found in nuclear waste and that represents a concern in terms of proliferation is Pu-239. The large stock of plutonium is a result of its production inside uranium-fueled reactors and of the reprocessing of weapons-grade plutonium during the weapons program. An option for getting rid of this plutonium is to use it as a fuel in a traditional light-water reactors (LWR). Several fuel types with differing plutonium destruction efficiencies are under study.

Transmutation was banned in the United States in April 1977 by U. S. President Carter due to the danger of plutonium proliferation, but President Reagan rescinded the ban in 1981. Due to economic losses and risks, the construction of reprocessing plants during this time did not resume. Due to high energy demand, work on the method has continued in the European Union (EU). This has resulted in a practical nuclear research reactor called Myrrha in which transmutation is possible. Additionally, a new research program called ACTINET has been started in the EU to make transmutation possible on an industrial scale. According to U. S. President Bush's Global Nuclear Energy Partnership (GNEP) of 2007, the United States is actively promoting research on transmutation technologies needed to markedly reduce the problem of nuclear waste treatment.

There have also been theoretical studies involving the use of fusion reactors as so-called "actinide burners" where a fusion reactor plasma such as in a tokamak, could be "doped" with a small amount of the "minor" transuranic atoms which would be transmuted (meaning fissioned in the actinide case) to lighter elements upon their successive bombardment by the very high energy neutrons produced by the fusion of deuterium and tritium in the reactor. A study at MIT found that only two or three fusion reactors with parameters similar to that of the International Thermonuclear Experimental Reactor (ITER) could transmute the entire annual minor actinide production from all of the light-water reactors presently operating in the United States fleet while simultaneously generating approximately one gigawatt of power from each reactor.

Opportunities for managing nuclear waste by transmutation are also being explored in linear particle accelerators. Through US DOE ARPA-E's Nuclear Energy Waste Transmutation Optimized Now, or NEWTON program, the DOE aims to explore economically viable transmutation at a scale for transmutation of commercially used US nuclear fuel stockpile within 30 years mainly focusing on particle accelerator technology. The program expects to process used nuclear fuel to reduce the time it requires to reach radiotoxicity of natural uranium ore, from 100,000 years of cooling to 300 years. High energy proton beams are used in production of neutron beams through collision with heavy element target, like lead or bismuth, in a process called spallation. Reducing the size and cost of such setup is a major area of focus for practical viability of the process.

2018 Nobel Prize for Physics-winner Gérard Mourou has proposed using chirped pulse amplification to generate high-energy and low-duration laser pulses either to accelerate deuterons into a tritium target causing fusion events yielding fast neutrons, or accelerating protons for neutron spallation, with either method intended for transmutation of nuclear waste.

==== Re-use ====
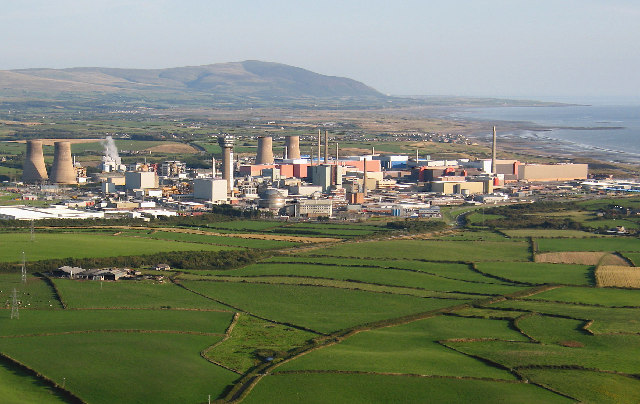
Sellafield nuclear reprocessing site, UK

Nuclear reprocessing is the chemical separation of fission products and actinides from spent nuclear fuel. Originally, reprocessing was used to extract plutonium for producing nuclear weapons. With commercialization of nuclear power, reprocessed plutonium was recycled into MOX nuclear fuel for thermal reactors. Reprocessed uranium can in principle be re-used as fuel. Nuclear reprocessing may include the reprocessing of other nuclear reactor material, such as Zircaloy cladding.

The high radioactivity of spent fuel means that reprocessing must be controlled and executed in advanced facilities by specialized personnel. Numerous processes exist, dominated by the chemical-based PUREX process. Alternatives include heating to drive off volatile elements, oxidation, and fluoride volatility (which uses reactive fluorine gas). Each process results in some form of refined nuclear product, with radioactive waste as a byproduct. Because this could allow production of weapons grade nuclear material, nuclear reprocessing is a concern for nuclear proliferation.

Spent fuel reprocessing is relatively expensive compared to the once-through fuel cycle, but fuel use can be increased and waste volumes decreased. Reprocessing is performed routinely in Europe, Russia, and Japan. The United States halted commercial reprocessing plans in the 1970s but has continued to pursue reprocessing-related scientific research. Most nuclear fuel does not require reprocessing. Breeder reactors can use recycled plutonium and uranium as well as other actinides, closing the nuclear fuel cycle and potentially multiplying the energy extracted from natural uranium by ~60-fold and dramatically reducing long-lived high-level radioactive waste.

Spent nuclear fuel contains abundant fertile uranium and traces of fissile materials. Methods such as the PUREX process can be used to remove useful actinides for the production of active nuclear fuel.

Another option is to reuse specific isotopes. Caesium-137, strontium-90 and other isotopes are extracted for food irradiation and radioisotope thermoelectric generators. While re-use does not eliminate the need to manage radioisotopes, it can reduce the quantity of remaining waste.

==== Space disposal ====
Space disposal is attractive because it removes nuclear waste from the planet. It has significant disadvantages, such as the potential for catastrophic failure of a launch vehicle, which could spread radioactive material into the atmosphere and around the world. A high number of launches would be required because no individual rocket would be able to carry very much of the material relative to the total amount that needs to be disposed. This makes the proposal economically impractical and increases the risk of one or more launch failures. To further complicate matters, international agreements on the regulation of such a program would need to be established. Costs and inadequate reliability of modern rocket launch systems for space disposal has been one of the motives for interest in non-rocket spacelaunch systems such as mass drivers, space elevators, and other proposals.

=== National management plans ===
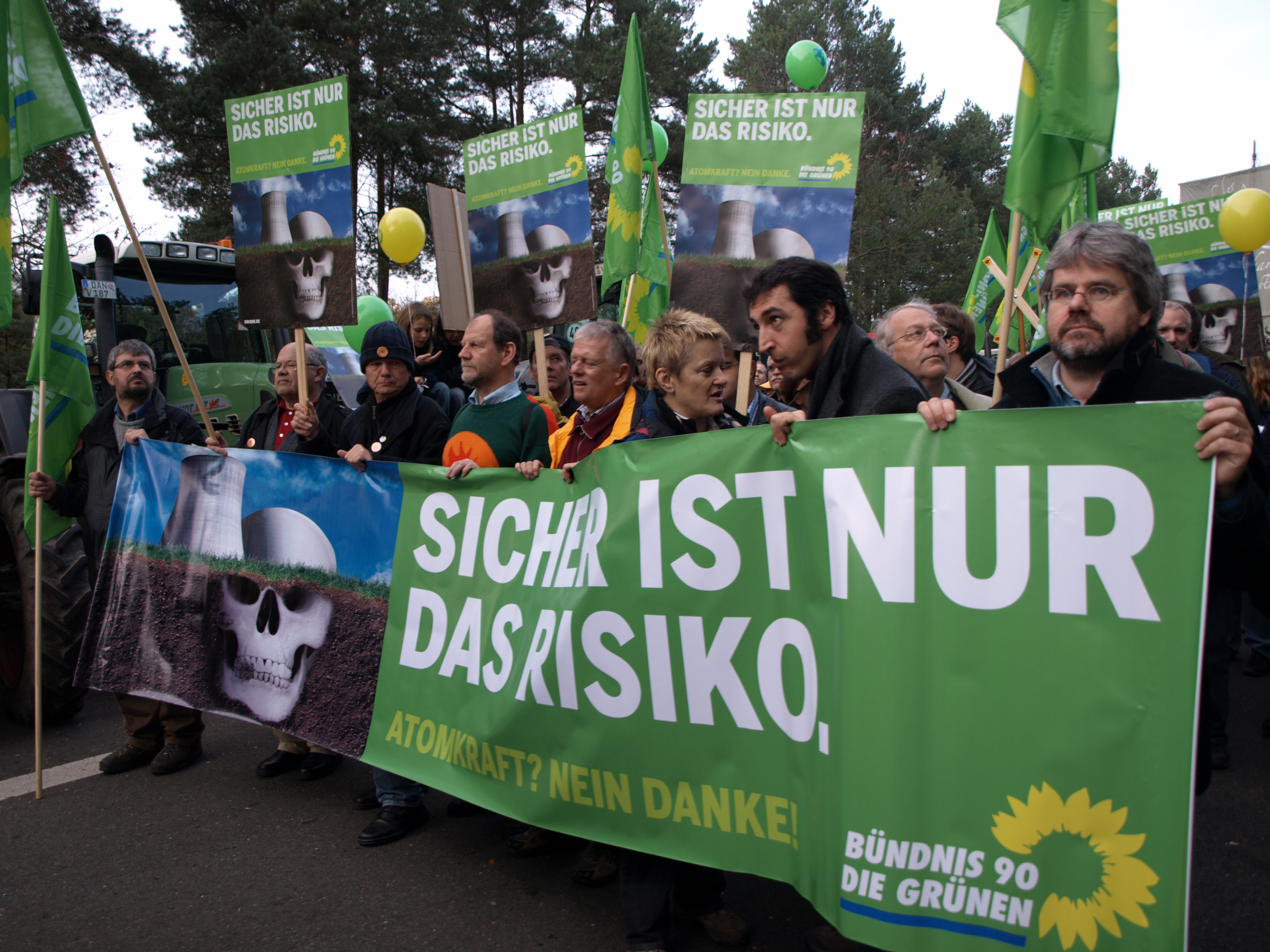
Anti-nuclear protest near a nuclear waste disposal centre at Gorleben in northern Germany

Sweden and Finland are furthest along in committing to a particular disposal technology, while many others reprocess spent fuel or contract with France or Great Britain to do it, taking back the resulting plutonium and high-level waste. "An increasing backlog of plutonium from reprocessing is developing in many countries... It is doubtful that reprocessing makes economic sense in the present environment of cheap uranium."

In many European countries (e.g., Britain, Finland, the Netherlands, Sweden, and Switzerland) the risk or dose limit for a member of the public exposed to radiation from a future high-level nuclear waste facility is considerably more stringent than that suggested by the International Commission on Radiation Protection or proposed in the United States. European limits are often more stringent than the standard suggested in 1990 by the International Commission on Radiation Protection by a factor of 20, and more stringent by a factor of ten than the standard proposed by the U.S. Environmental Protection Agency (EPA) for the Yucca Mountain nuclear waste repository for the first 10,000 years after closure.

The U.S. EPA's proposed standard for greater than 10,000 years is 250 times more permissive than the European limit. The U.S. EPA proposed a legal limit of a maximum of 3.5 millisieverts (350 millirem) each annually to local individuals after 10,000 years, which would be up to several percent of the exposure currently received by some populations in the highest natural background regions on Earth, though the United States Department of Energy (DOE) predicted that received dose would be much below that limit. Over a timeframe of thousands of years, after the most active short half-life radioisotopes decayed, burying U.S. nuclear waste would increase the radioactivity in the top 2000 feet of rock and soil in the United States (10 million km^{2}) by approximately 1 part in 10 million over the cumulative amount of natural radioisotopes in such a volume, but the vicinity of the site would have a far higher concentration of artificial radioisotopes underground than such an average.

==== Mongolia ====
After serious opposition about plans and negotiations between Mongolia with Japan and the United States to build nuclear-waste facilities in Mongolia, Mongolia stopped all negotiations in September 2011. These negotiations had started after U.S. Deputy Secretary of Energy Daniel Poneman visited Mongolia in September 2010. Talks took place in Washington, D.C. between officials of Japan, the United States, and Mongolia in February 2011. After this the United Arab Emirates (UAE), which wanted to buy nuclear fuel from Mongolia, joined in the negotiations. The talks were kept secret and, although the Mainichi Daily News reported on them in May, Mongolia officially denied the existence of these negotiations. Alarmed by this news, Mongolian citizens protested against the plans and demanded the government withdraw the plans and disclose information. The Mongolian President Tsakhiagiin Elbegdorj issued a presidential order on September 13 banning all negotiations with foreign governments or international organizations on nuclear-waste storage plans in Mongolia. The Mongolian government has accused the newspaper of distributing false claims around the world. After the presidential order, the Mongolian president fired the individual who was supposedly involved in these conversations.

=== Illegal dumping ===
Authorities in Italy have investigated a 'Ndrangheta mafia clan accused of trafficking and illegally dumping nuclear waste. According to a whistleblower, a manager of the Italy state energy research agency Enea paid the clan to get rid of 600 drums of toxic and radioactive waste from Italy, Switzerland, France, Germany, and the United States, with Somalia as the destination, where the waste was buried after buying off local politicians. Former employees of Enea are suspected of paying the criminals to take waste off their hands in the 1980s and 1990s. Shipments to Somalia continued into the 1990s, while the 'Ndrangheta clan also blew up shiploads of waste, including radioactive hospital waste, sending them to the sea bed off the Calabrian coast. According to the environmental group Legambiente, former members of the 'Ndrangheta have said that they were paid to sink ships with radioactive material for the last 20 years.

In 2008, Afghan authorities accused Pakistan of illegally dumping nuclear waste in the southern parts of Afghanistan when the Taliban were in power between 1996 and 2001. The Pakistani government denied the allegation.

== Accidents ==
A few incidents have occurred when radioactive material was disposed of improperly, shielding during transport was defective, or when it was simply abandoned or even stolen from a waste store. In the Soviet Union, waste stored in Lake Karachay was blown over the area during a dust storm after the lake had partly dried out. In Italy, several radioactive waste deposits let material flow into river water, thus contaminating water for domestic use. In France in the summer of 2008, numerous incidents happened: in one, at the Areva plant in Tricastin, it was reported that, during a draining operation, liquid containing untreated uranium overflowed out of a faulty tank and about 75 kg of the radioactive material seeped into the ground and, from there, into two rivers nearby; in another case, over 100 staff were contaminated with low doses of radiation. There are ongoing concerns around the deterioration of the nuclear waste site on the Enewetak Atoll of the Marshall Islands and a potential radioactive spill.

Scavenging of abandoned radioactive material has been the cause of several other cases of radiation exposure, mostly in developing nations, which may have less regulation of dangerous substances (and sometimes less general education about radioactivity and its hazards) and a market for scavenged goods and scrap metal. The scavengers and those who buy the material are almost always unaware that the material is radioactive and it is selected for its aesthetics or scrap value. Irresponsibility on the part of the radioactive material's owners, usually a hospital, university, or military, and the absence of regulation concerning radioactive waste, or a lack of enforcement of such regulations, have been significant factors in radiation exposures. For an example of an accident involving radioactive scrap originating from a hospital, see the Goiânia accident.

Transportation accidents involving spent nuclear fuel from power plants are unlikely to have serious consequences due to the strength of the spent nuclear fuel shipping casks.

On 15 December 2011, top government spokesman Osamu Fujimura of the Japanese government admitted that nuclear substances were found in the waste of Japanese nuclear facilities. Although Japan did commit itself in 1977 to inspections in the safeguard agreement with the IAEA, the reports were kept secret for the inspectors of the International Atomic Energy Agency. Japan did start discussions with the IAEA about the large quantities of enriched uranium and plutonium that were discovered in nuclear waste cleared away by Japanese nuclear operators. At the press conference Fujimura said: "Based on investigations so far, most nuclear substances have been properly managed as waste, and from that perspective, there is no problem in safety management," but according to him, the matter was at that moment still being investigated.

== Associated hazard warning signs ==
The trefoil symbol used to indicate ionizing radiation

2007 ISO radioactivity danger symbol intended for IAEA Category 1, 2 and 3 sources defined as dangerous sources capable of death or serious injury

The dangerous goods transport classification sign for radioactive materials

== See also ==
- Ducrete
- Environmental remediation
- Human Interference Task Force
- List of global issues
- Lists of nuclear disasters and radioactive incidents
- Material unaccounted for
- Mixed waste (radioactive/hazardous)
- Microbial corrosion
- Nuclear decommissioning
- Personal protective equipment
- Radiation protection
- Radioactive contamination
- Radioactive scrap metal
- Radioecology
- Toxic waste
- Waste management
- UraMin
- Long-term nuclear waste warning messages

== Cited sources ==
- Vandenbosch, Robert & Vandenbosch, Susanne E. (2007). Nuclear waste stalemate. Salt Lake City: University of Utah Press. ISBN 978-0874809039.
- Hecker, Siegfried S. (2000). "The Plutonium Challenge-Environmental Issues". Los Alamos Science (26). Los Alamos National Laboratory: 36–47.
