= Low-level waste =

Nuclear waste category

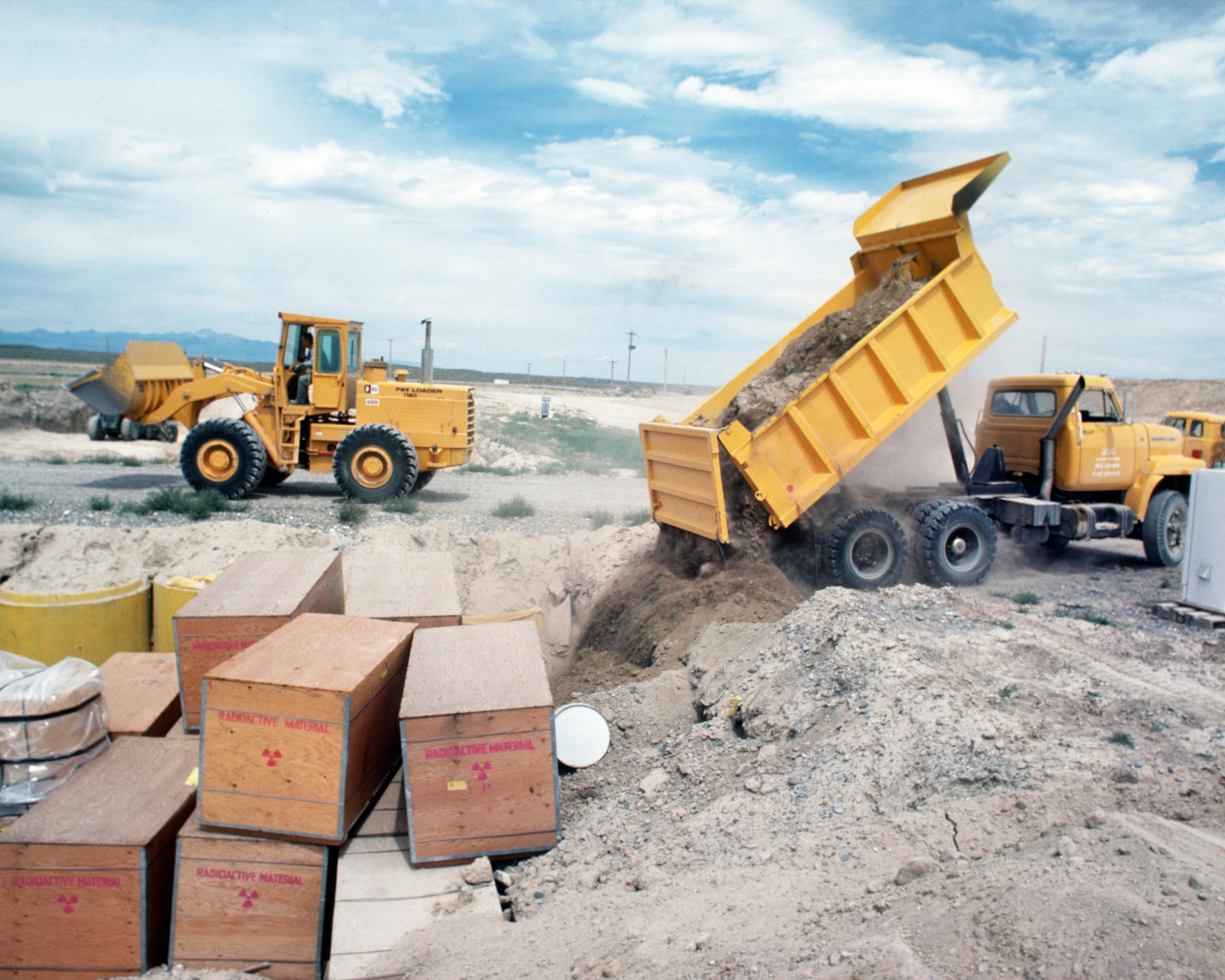
Low-level waste buried under layers of soil at a storage facility.

Low-level waste (LLW) or low-level radioactive waste (LLRW) is a category of nuclear waste. The definition of low-level waste is set by the nuclear regulators of individual countries, though the International Atomic Energy Agency (IAEA) provides recommendations.

LLW includes items that have become contaminated with radioactive material or have become radioactive through exposure to neutron radiation. This waste typically consists of contaminated protective shoe covers and clothing, wiping rags, mops, filters, reactor water treatment residues, equipments and tools, luminous dials, medical tubes, swabs, injection needles, syringes, and laboratory animal carcasses and tissues.

== LLW in the United Kingdom ==
In the UK, LLW is defined as waste with specific activities below 12 gigabecquerel/tonne (GBq/t) beta/gamma and below 4 GBq/t alpha emitting nuclides. Waste with specific activities above these thresholds are categorised as either Intermediate-level waste (ILW) or high heat generating waste depending upon the heat output of the waste.

Very Low Level Waste (VLLW) is a sub-category of LLW. VLLW is LLW that is suitable disposal with regular household or industrial waste at specially permitted landfill facilities. The major components of VLLW from nuclear sites are building rubble, soil and steel items. These arise from the dismantling and demolition of nuclear reactors and facilities.

== LLW in the United States ==
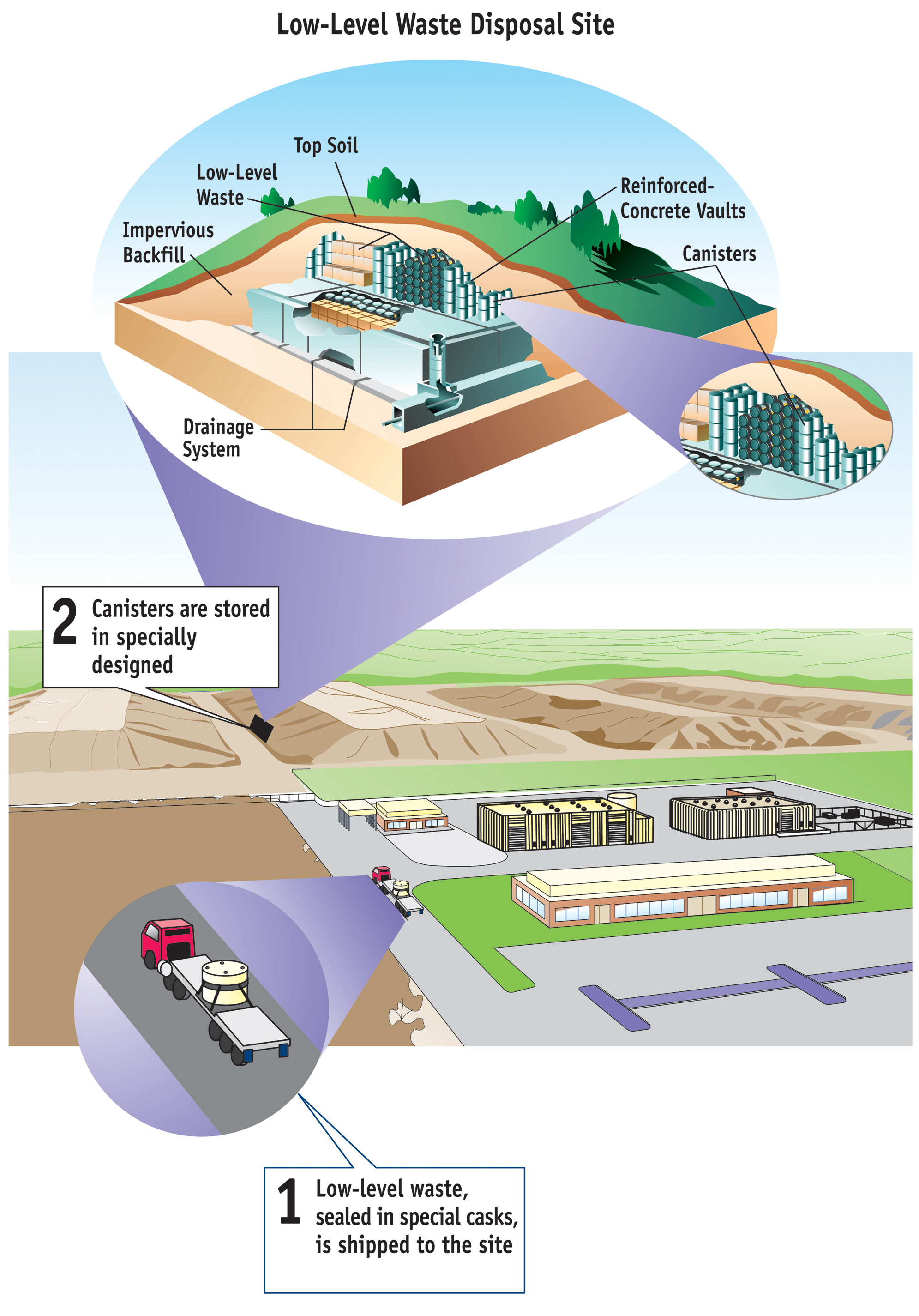
NRC graphic of a low-level waste facility

LLW in the United States is defined as nuclear waste that does not fit into the categorical definitions: high-level waste (HLW), spent nuclear fuel (SNF), transuranic waste (TRU), or certain byproduct materials known as 11e(2) wastes, such as uranium mill tailings. In essence, it is a definition by exclusion, and LLW is that category of radioactive wastes that do not fit into the other categories. If LLW is mixed with hazardous wastes as classified by RCRA, then it has a special status as mixed low-level waste (MLLW) and must satisfy treatment, storage, and disposal regulations both as LLW and as hazardous waste. While the bulk of LLW is not highly radioactive, the definition of LLW does not include references to its activity, and some LLW may be quite radioactive, as in the case of radioactive sources used in industry and medicine.

It is notable that U.S. regulations do not define the category intermediate-level waste and thus many wastes which would fall into this category under other regulatory regimes are instead classified as LLW. This also means that the radioactive of LLW in the US can range from just above background levels found in nature to very highly radioactive in certain cases such as parts from inside the reactor vessel in a nuclear power plant.

=== Disposal ===
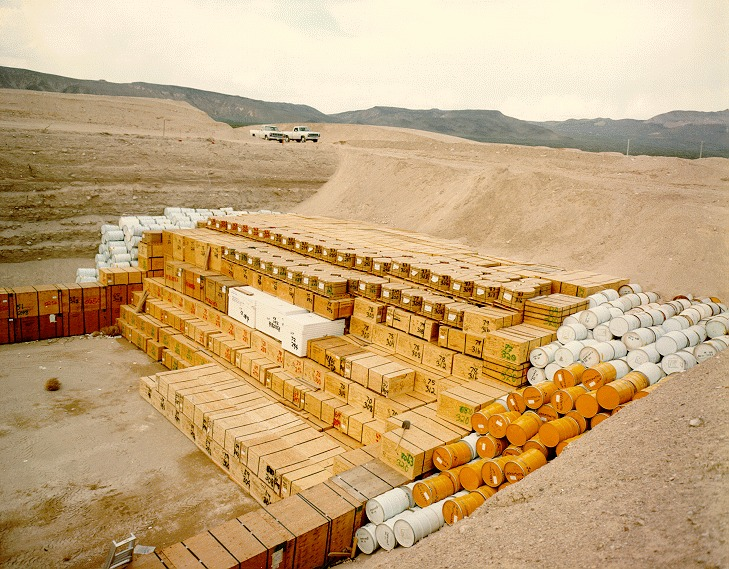
Low-level waste storage pit at the Nevada National Security Site

Depending on who "owns" the waste, its handling and disposal is regulated differently. All nuclear facilities, whether they are a utility or a disposal site, have to comply with Nuclear Regulatory Commission (NRC) regulations. The four low-level waste facilities in the U.S. are Barnwell, South Carolina; Richland, Washington; Clive, Utah; and as of June 2013, Andrews County, Texas. The Barnwell and the Clive locations are operated by EnergySolutions, the Richland location is operated by U.S. Ecology, and the Andrews County location is operated by Waste Control Specialists. Barnwell, Richland, and Andrews County accept Classes A through C of low-level waste, whereas Clive only accepts Class A LLW. The DOE has dozens of LLW sites under management. The largest of these exist at DOE Reservations around the country (e.g. the Hanford Reservation, Savannah River Site, Nevada Test Site, Los Alamos National Laboratory, Oak Ridge National Laboratory, Idaho National Laboratory, to name the most significant).

Classes of wastes are detailed in 10 C.F.R. § 61.55 Waste Classification, enforced by the Nuclear Regulatory Commission, reproduced in the table below. These are not all the isotopes disposed of at these facilities, just the ones that are of most concern for the long-term monitoring of the sites. Waste is divided into three classes, A through C, where A is the least radioactive and C is the most radioactive. Class A LLW is able to be deposited near the surface, whereas Classes B and C LLW have to be buried progressively deeper.

In 10 C.F.R. § 20.2002, the NRC reserves the right to grant a free release of radioactive waste. The overall activity of such a disposal cannot exceed 1 mrem/yr and the NRC regards requests on a case-by-case basis. Low-level waste passing such strict regulations is then disposed of in a landfill with other garbage. Items allowed to be disposed of in this way include glow-in-the-dark watches (radium) and smoke detectors (americium).

Radionuclide	Class A (curies/m^{3})	Class B (Ci/m^{3})	Class C (Ci/m^{3}) (upper limit for LLW)
Total of all nuclides with less than 5-year half life	700	No limit	No limit
Tritium (^{3}H)	40	No limit	No limit
Cobalt-60 (^{60}Co)	700	No limit	No limit
Nickel-63 (^{63}Ni)	3.5	70	700
Ni-63 in activated metal	35	700	7000
Strontium-90 (^{90}Sr)	0.04	150	7000
Cesium-137 (^{137}Cs)	1	44	4600
Carbon-14(^{14}C)	0.8		8
C-14 in activated metal	8		80
Nickel-59 (^{59}Ni) in activated metal	22		220
Niobium-94 (^{94}Nb) in activated metal	0.02		0.2
Technetium-99 (^{99}Tc)	0.3		3
Iodine-129 (^{129}I)	0.008		0.08
Alpha-emitting transuranic nuclides with a half-life greater than 5 years	10 nCi/g		100 nCi/g
Plutonium-241 (^{241}Pu)	350 nCi/g		3500 nCi/g
Curium-242 (^{242}Cm)	2000 nCi/g		20000 nCi/g

LLW should not be confused with high-level waste (HLW) or spent nuclear fuel (SNF). C Class low-level waste has a limit of 100 nanocuries per gram of alpha-emitting transuranic nuclides with a half-life greater than 5 years; any more than 100 nCi, and it must be classified as transuranic waste (TRU). These require different disposal pathways. TRU wastes from the U.S. nuclear weapons complex is currently disposed at the Waste Isolation Pilot Plant (WIPP) near Carlsbad, New Mexico, though other sites also are being considered for on-site disposal of particularly-difficult-to-manage TRU wastes.

== See also ==
- Low Level Waste Repository
- Mixed waste (radioactive/hazardous)
- Radioactive waste
- Spent nuclear fuel
- Transuranic waste
