= Geoforecasting =

Geoforecasting is the science of predicting the movement of tectonic plates and the future climate, shape, and other geological elements of the planet.

Geoforecasting is particularly important in the siting of depositories for radioactive materials. It also is useful in other areas with long term management issues such as water management.
