= Mixed waste (radioactive/hazardous) =

According to the United States Environmental Protection Agency, mixed waste (MW) is a waste type defined as follows; "MW contains both hazardous waste (as defined by RCRA and its amendments) and radioactive waste (as defined by AEA and its amendments). It is jointly regulated by NRC or NRC's Agreement States and EPA or EPA's RCRA Authorized States. The fundamental and most comprehensive statutory definition is found in the Federal Facilities Compliance Act (FFCA) where Section 1004(41) was added to RCRA: "The term 'mixed waste' means waste that contains both hazardous waste and source, special nuclear, or byproduct material subject to the Atomic Energy Act of 1954."

Mixed waste is much more expensive to manage and dispose of than waste that is solely radioactive. Waste generators can avoid higher charge back costs by eliminating or minimizing the volume of mixed waste generated.

== US EPA hazardous waste definition ==
The EPA defines hazardous waste as the following: A subset of solid wastes that pose substantial or potential threats to public health or the environment and meet any of the following criteria identified 40 CFR 260 and 261:

- It is specifically listed as a hazardous waste by EPA
- It exhibits one or more of the characteristics of hazardous waste (ignitability, corrosivity, reactivity, and/or toxicity);
- It is generated by the treatment of hazardous waste; or is contained in a hazardous waste.
