= Zirconolite =

Oxide mineral

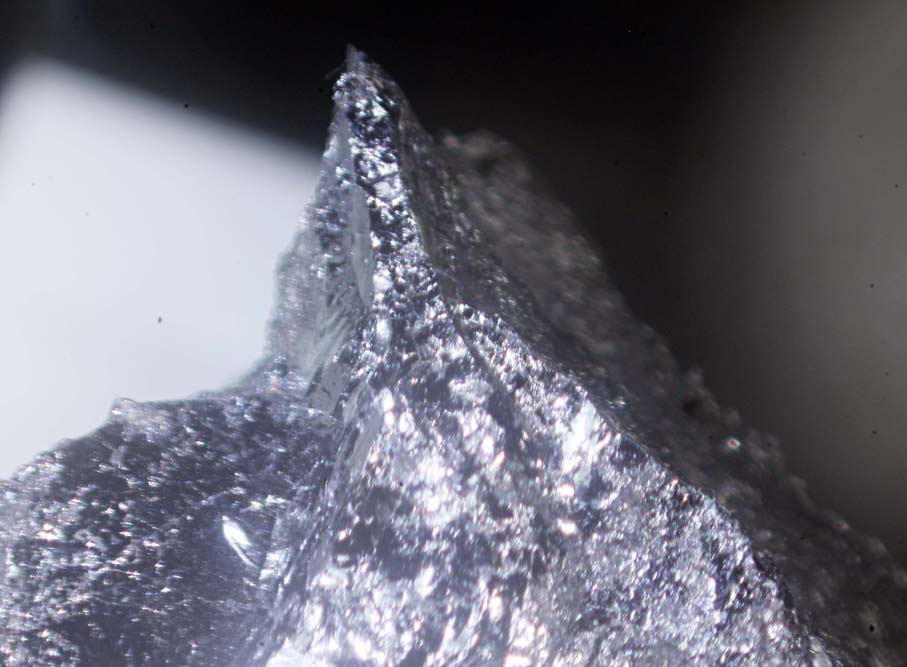
- Black crystal aggregates of the rare zirconium mineral zirconolite.

General
- Category: Oxide minerals
- Formula: CaZrTi_{2}O_{7}
- IMA symbol: Zrc
- Strunz classification: 4.DH.30
- Crystal system: 2M polytype: monoclinic 3O polytype: orthorhombic 3T polytype: trigonal
- Crystal class: 2M polytype: prismatic (2/m); 3O polytype: dipyramidal (mmm (2/m 2/m 2/m)); 3T polytype: trapezohedral (3 2)

Identification
- Color: Black to brown, red
- Luster: Resinous, sub-Metallic
- Streak: Dark brown, brownish yellow
- Diaphaneity: Translucent, opaque

Zirconolite is a mineral, calcium zirconium titanate; formula CaZrTi_{2}O_{7}. Some examples of the mineral may also contain thorium, uranium, cerium, niobium and iron; the presence of thorium or uranium would make the mineral radioactive. It is black or brown in color.
