= Olkiluoto Nuclear Power Plant =

Nuclear power plant in Eurajoki, Finland

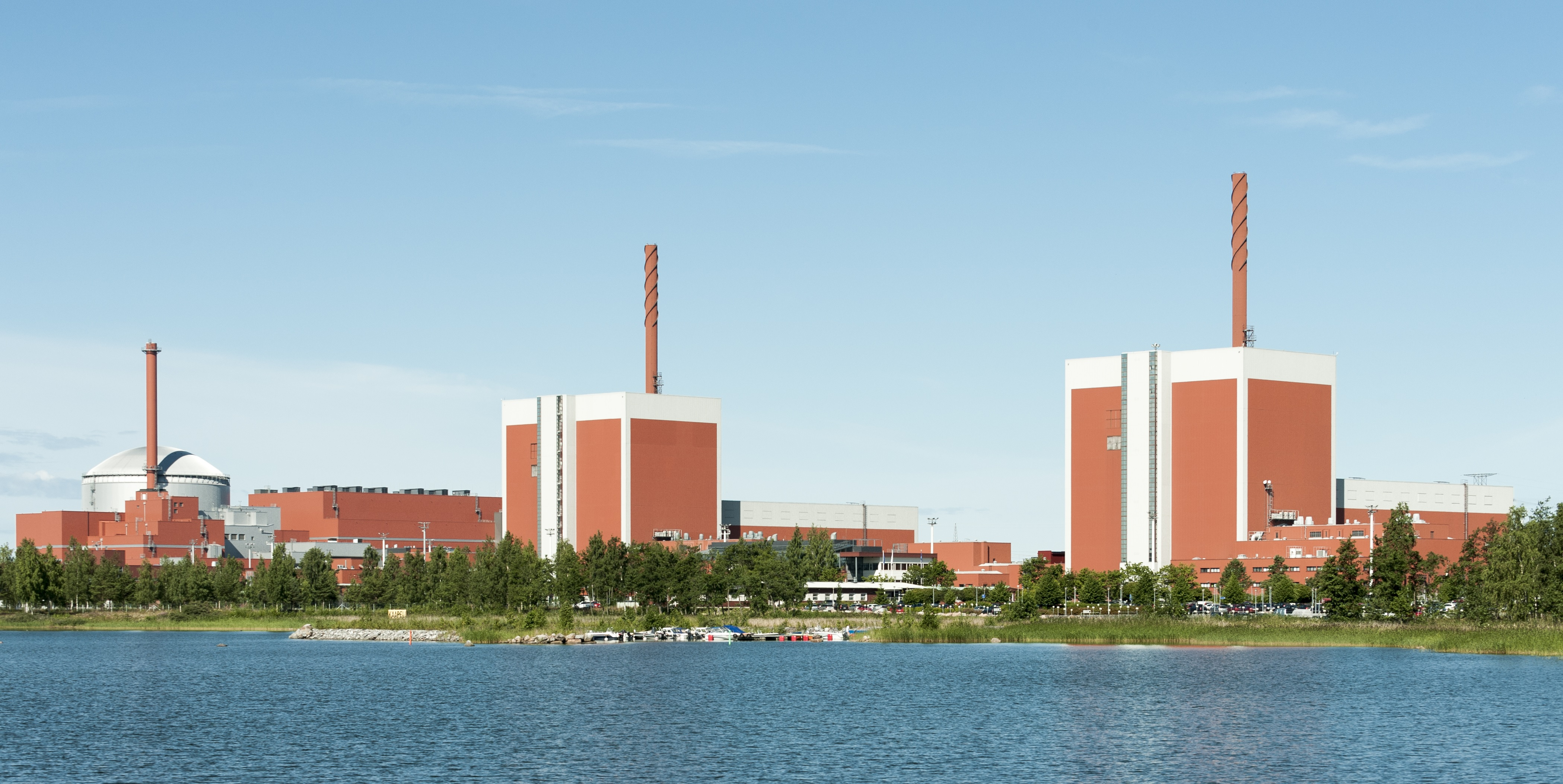
- Olkiluoto Nuclear Power Plant in 2015
- Official name: Olkiluodon ydinvoimalaitos
- Country: Finland
- Location: Eurajoki, Region of Satakunta
- Coordinates: 61°14′13″N 21°26′27″E
- Status: Operational
- Construction began: Unit 1: 1 February 1974; Unit 2: 1 November 1975; Unit 3: 12 August 2005
- Commission date: Unit 1: 10 October 1979; Unit 2: 10 July 1982; Unit 3: 16 April 2023
- Owner: Teollisuuden Voima Oyj (TVO)
- Operator: TVO
- Employees: 1000 (2021)

Nuclear power station
- Reactors: 3
- Reactor type: Units 1–2: BWR; Unit 3: PWR (EPR)
- Reactor supplier: Units 1–2: AB ASEA-ATOM; Unit 3: Areva S.A.
- Cooling source: Gulf of Bothnia
- Thermal capacity: 2 × 2,500 MW_{th} (Units 1–2) 1 × 4,300 MW_{th} (Unit 3) Combined: 9,300 MW_{th}

Power generation
- Units operational: 2 × 890 MW_{e} (net) (Units 1–2); 1 × 1,600 MW_{e} (net) (Unit 3)
- Make and model: Units 1–2: ASEA-III, BWR-2500; Unit 3: Framatome EPR
- Nameplate capacity: 3,380 MW
- Capacity factor: 92.8% (2021)
- Annual net output: 14,400 GW·h (2021)

External links
- Website: Olkiluoto nuclear power plant
- Commons: Related media on Commons

The Olkiluoto Nuclear Power Plant (Finnish: Olkiluodon ydinvoimalaitos, Swedish: Olkiluoto kärnkraftverk) is one of Finland's two nuclear power plants, the other being the two-unit Loviisa Nuclear Power Plant. The plant is owned and operated by Teollisuuden Voima (TVO), and is located on Olkiluoto Island, on the shore of the Gulf of Bothnia, in the municipality of Eurajoki in western Finland, about 20 kilometres (12 mi) from the town of Rauma and about 50 kilometres (31 mi) from the city of Pori.

The Olkiluoto plant consists of two boiling water reactors (BWRs), each with a capacity of 890 MW, and one EPR type reactor (unit 3) with a capacity of 1,600 MW. This makes unit 3 currently the most powerful nuclear power plant unit in Europe and the third most powerful globally. Construction of unit 3 began in 2005. Commercial operation, originally scheduled for May 2009, began on 1 May 2023.

A decision-in-principle for a fourth reactor to be built at the site was granted by the Finnish parliament in July 2010, but in June 2015 TVO decided that it would not apply for a construction license for Olkiluoto 4.

== Units 1 and 2 ==
Units 1 and 2 consists of two BWRs, each producing 890 MW of electricity. The main contractor was ASEA-Atom, now a part of Westinghouse Electric Sweden AB. Turbine generators were supplied by Stal-Laval. The units' architecture was designed by ASEA-Atom. The reactor pressure vessels were constructed by Uddcomb Sweden AB, and reactor internal parts, mechanical components by Finnatom. The electrical equipment was supplied by Strömberg. Unit 1 was constructed by Atomirakennus and unit 2 by Jukola and Työyhtymä. Unit 1 achieved its initial criticality in July 1978 and it started commercial operations in October 1979. Unit 2 achieved its initial criticality in October 1979 and it started commercial operations in July 1982.

The original power of the reactors was 660 MW. They were uprated to 710 MW in 1983–1984, to 840 MW in 1995–1998, and further to 860 MW in 2005–2006. Major upgrades were carried out to the units in 2010 and 2011, including replacement of turbines and generators, isolation valves, electrical switchgear and seawater pumps. The upgrades increased the net electrical output by 20 MW to 880 MW each.

In 2017, unit 2 was upgraded and modernized, increasing the output further to 890 MW from the beginning of 2018. A similar upgrade to unit 1 was performed in 2018. The extended maintenance was also made to prepare for a license renewal application. The license extension was granted in September 2018 and allows the reactors to operate until 2038.

In 2023, TVO announced it is considering seeking another license extension of at least 10 years and a power uprate of 80 MW to 970 MW. The environmental impact assessment program, published in January 2024, investigates options to extend the lifetime by 10 or 20 years at the current power or uprating to 970 MW (in 2028 at the earliest) in addition to the 10 or 20-year extension.

== Unit 3 ==
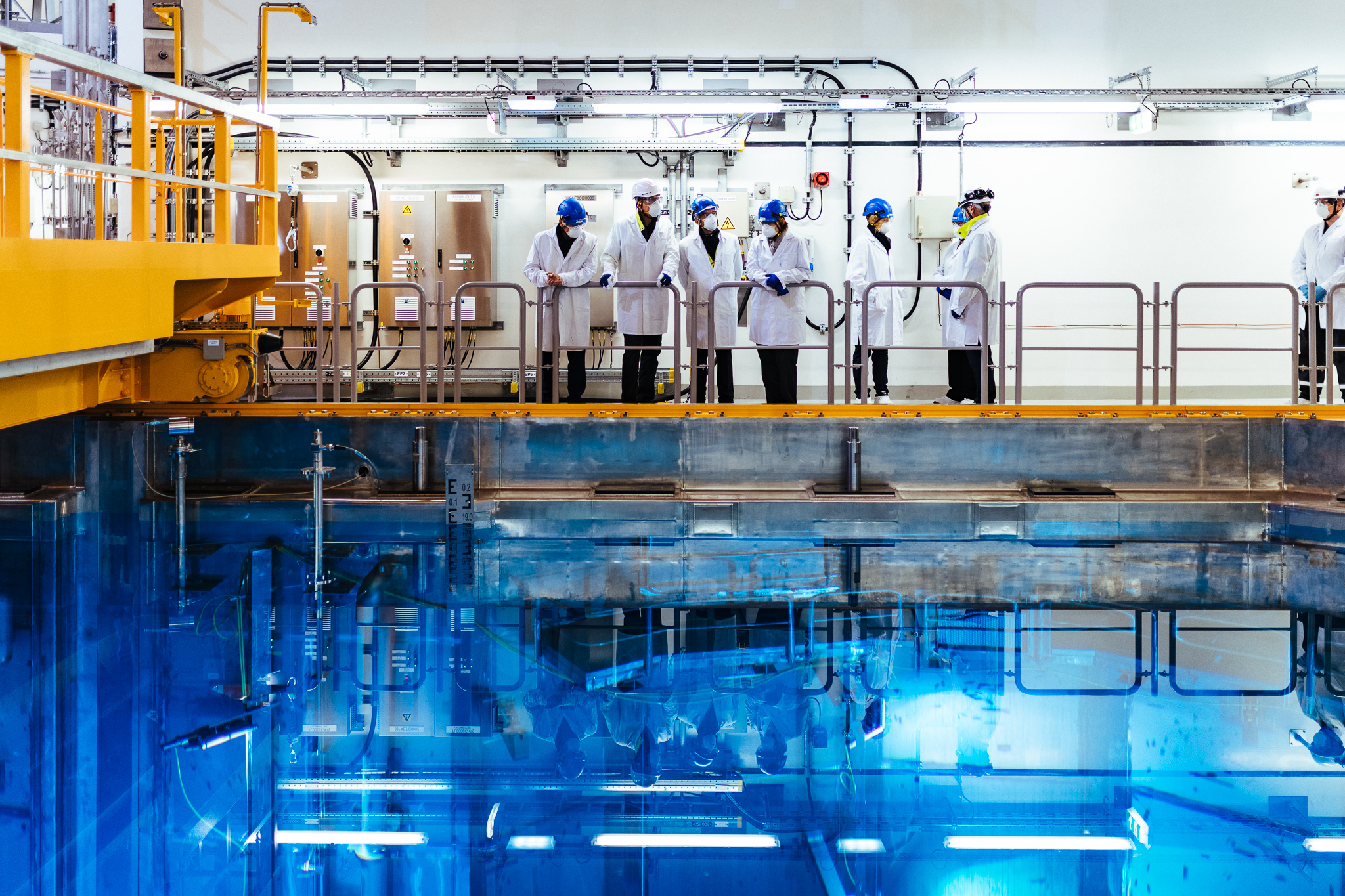
Rafael Grossi visit to Olkiluoto NPP on 26 November 2020

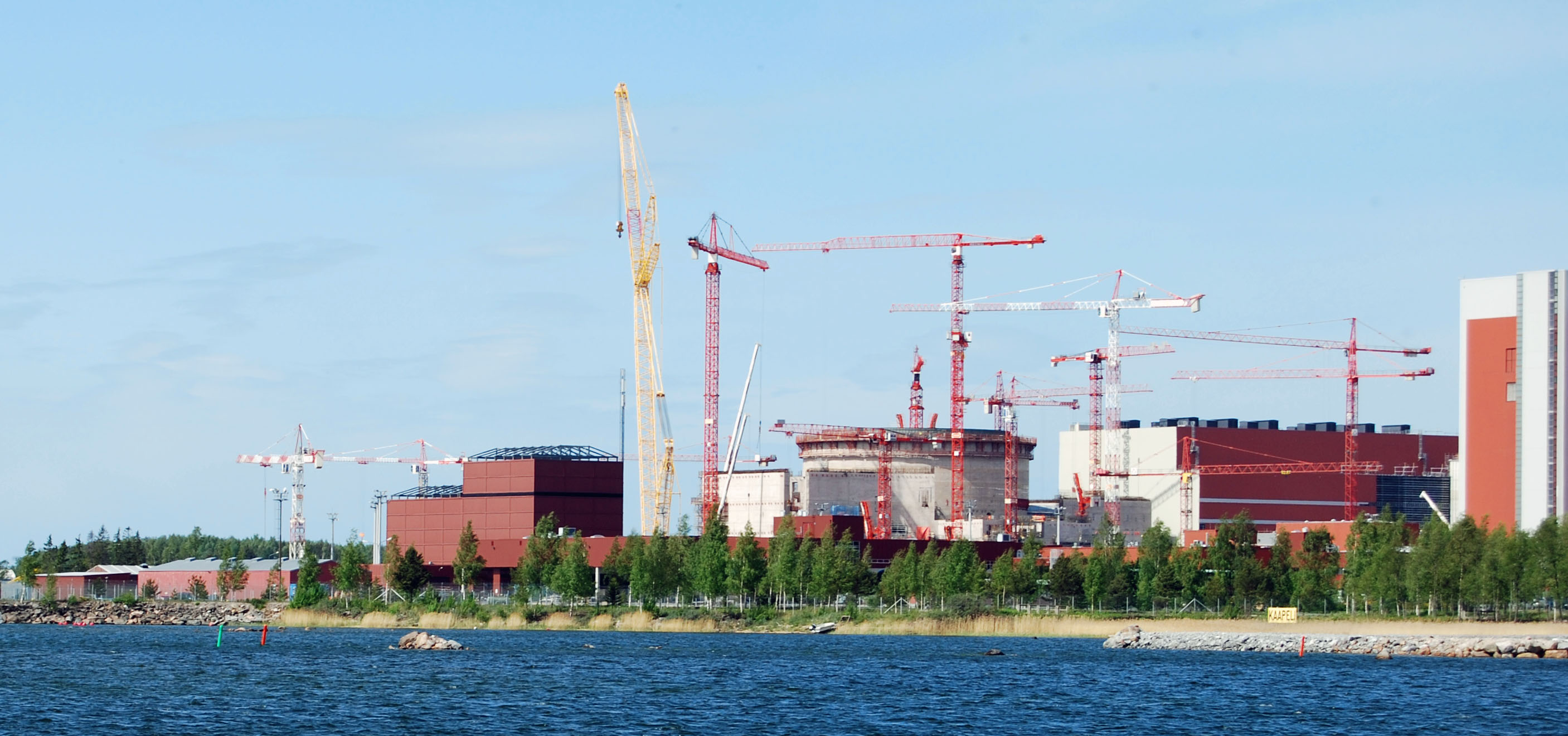
Olkiluoto 3 in 2009

Unit 3 is a EPR, a type of third generation pressurized water reactor. It has a nameplate capacity of 1600 MW. Japan Steel Works and Mitsubishi Heavy Industries manufactured the unit's 526-ton reactor pressure vessel.

Construction started in 2005, and the start of commercial operation was planned for 2010. This was pushed back several times only starting regular production in 2023, 18 years after the start of construction.

=== History ===
In February 2005, the Finnish government gave its permission to TVO to construct a new nuclear reactor, making Finland the first Western European country in 15 years to order one. The construction of the unit began in 2005. Olkiluoto 3 was the first EPR to have begun construction. At the start of construction, the main contractor was Areva NP (now Framatome), a joint venture of Areva and Siemens. However, in 2009, Siemens sold its one-third share of Areva NP to Areva, which became the main contractor. Siemens remained on the project as the subcontractor with the main responsibility for constructing the turbine hall. Areva later sold its majority stake in Framatome, its nuclear reactor and fuel business, to Électricité de France.

According to TVO, the construction phase of the project would create a total of about 30,000 person-years of employment directly and indirectly; that the highest number of on-site employees has been almost 4,400; and that the operation phase would create 150 to 200 permanent jobs. A 90 MW battery storage was scheduled for 2022.

On 8 December 2021, the company submitted its application to Finland's Radiation and Nuclear Safety Authority asking permission to start up Unit 3 and to move forward with initial testing of the unit. This was granted on 16 December 2021. First criticality of the OL3 EPR plant unit was reached on 21 December 2021. An unplanned SCRAM occurred on 14 January 2022, delaying connection to the national grid to February 2022. Electricity production of Olkiluoto's third nuclear power plant unit started on 12 March 2022 at 12.01 p.m. In May 2022, foreign material detached from the steam guide plates was found in the turbine steam reheater, and the plant was shut down for about three months of repair work.

In September 2022, the Radiation and Nuclear Safety Authority (STUK) granted a licence for the Olkiluoto 3 reactor to increase its power output to more than 60 percent to a full 4,300 MW of thermal capacity. On 30 September 2022, the reactor achieved its design output power. In October 2022, damage was discovered in the feedwater pumps and unit 3 was shut down for an investigation, delaying the end of commissioning testing. On 28 October, it was announced that cracks a few centimetres long had been found in all four of the feedwater pump impellers. The feedwater pumps are larger than in other nuclear reactors. In January 2023, it was announced that new more robust impellers will be installed in all four feedwater pumps, and test operation at full power should restart in February.

The plant started regular electricity production on 16 April 2023 after test production and commercial operation on 1 May 2023. Unusual for nuclear reactors in Scandinavia, OL3 reduced production in May 2023 due to negative market prices during the spring thaw when hydropower was unable to absorb surplus.

=== Construction delays ===
The first licence application for the third unit was made in December 2000 and the date of the unit's entry into service was estimated to be 2010. However, since the start of construction, several delays to the schedule have been announced. In July 2012, TVO announced that the unit would not go into service before 2015, five years after the original estimate. In a statement, the operator said it was "not pleased with the situation" although solutions to various problems were being found and work was "progressing", and that it was waiting for a new launch date from Areva and Siemens.

At the end of 2013, TVO said that the Areva-Siemens consortium plans to reduce workers and subcontractors on the construction site and says that it expects the contractor to provide details about the expected impact on the project's schedule.

In February 2014, TVO said that it could not give an estimate of the plant's startup date because it was still waiting for the Areva-Siemens consortium to provide it with an updated overall schedule for the project." Later the same month it was reported that Areva was shutting down construction due to the dispute over compensations and unfinished automation planning. According to Kauppalehti, the estimated opening was delayed until sometime between 2018 and 2020.

In July 2019, TVO announced that regular electricity generation is expected to start in July 2020. The delay was caused by slower than expected modification works. In August 2020, TVO announced that regular electricity generation was delayed to February 2022 due to slow progress in system testing, technical problems found in the testing, and delivery time of spare parts to replace faulty components.

The delays have been due to various problems with planning, supervision, and workmanship, and have been the subject of an inquiry by STUK, the Finnish nuclear safety regulator. The first problems that surfaced were irregularities in the foundation concrete, and caused a delay of months. Later, it was found that subcontractors had provided heavy forgings that were not up to project standards and which had to be re-cast. An apparent problem constructing the reactor's unique double-containment structure also caused delays, as the welders had not been given proper instructions.

In 2009, Petteri Tiippana, the director of STUK's nuclear power plant division, told the BBC that it was difficult to deliver nuclear power plant projects on schedule because builders were not used to working to the exacting standards required on nuclear construction sites, since so few new reactors had been built in recent years.

In 2010, Jukka Laaksonen, Director General of STUK at that time, analyzed reasons for the delay:

- Many nuclear power plants were constructed in Europe in the 1970s and 1980s. After that there was a long break in the construction, and experienced experts retired.
- Areva did not have experience in construction of nuclear power plants. In all the earlier projects in which Areva supplied the reactor, Électricité de France was responsible for the construction management. Many experienced subcontractors had left the business, and Areva had to find new subcontractors and to coach them in nuclear manufacturing.
- The original schedule, four years from construction start to grid connection, was too ambitious for a first-of-a-kind plant that is larger than any earlier reactor.
- The project started very slowly because Areva was not adequately prepared. When the construction permit was given in 2005, parts of the detailed design were not yet available. Areva did not recognize how much additional work was needed to complete it. The construction started to proceed in a controlled manner two years later.
- Areva was not used to STUK's regulatory approach with an early focus on the quality of structures and components. Manufacturing information and a quality control plan must be approved by both the licensee and STUK before manufacturing of the most important components is allowed to start. Inspections with hold points are made during the manufacturing.
- The large size of the reactor and the application of new technologies brought major challenges. Some manufacturing technologies had not been used before. For instance, new welding techniques were used in the reactor pressure vessel. Many large components, such as pressurizer forgings and some reactor internal parts, had to be re-manufactured once or twice to achieve the specified quality.
- TVO's key persons did not have experience from management of a large construction project.

Construction of the turbine succeeded better under the responsibility of Siemens. Installations of the main turbine equipment were completed about one year behind the original schedule.

After the construction of the unit started in 2005, Areva began constructing EPRs in Flamanville, France, and in Taishan, China. However, as of 2019, the construction of the EPR in France is ten years behind schedule. Taishan 1 in China became the first EPR to start power generation on 29 June 2018, and the second one (Taishan 2) came online in 2019.

=== Cost ===
The main contractor, Areva, was expected to build the unit for a fixed price of €3 billion, with any construction costs above that price falling on Areva. In July 2012, those overruns were estimated at more than €2 billion, and in December 2012, Areva estimated that the full cost of building the reactor would be about €8.5 billion, well over the previous estimate of €6.4 billion. Because of the delays, TVO and Areva both sought compensation from each other through the International Court of Arbitration.

In October 2013, TVO's demand for compensation from Areva had risen to €1.8 billion, and Areva's from TVO to €2.6 billion. In December 2013, Areva increased its demand to €2.7 billion. On 10 March 2018 French newspaper Le Monde announced that Areva and TVO had reached an agreement. A day later, TVO confirmed that Areva would pay it €450 million in compensation over the delays and lost income. The agreement would settle all legal actions between the two companies. With the settlement, TVO disclosed its total investment to be around €5.5 billion. Areva had accumulated losses of €5.5 billion. The total cost of the project, therefore, is estimated to be €11 billion.

Between 2013 and 2017 OL1 and OL2 produced between 13,385 GWh and 14,740 GWh per year at capacity factors between 87.2% and 96%. OL3 is expected to produce an additional 12,000–13,000 GWh annually. Even taking into account all OL3 construction delays the long-term target for operational production cost (not including investments and subsidies) for all three plants is 33 €/MWh. Production cost for the OL3 reactor alone is estimated at 49 €/MWh, as OL1-2 had a production cost of app. 18 €/MWh during 2016-2020, prior to OL3 entering service.

=== Criticism ===
In 2009, Stephen Thomas wrote: "Olkiluoto has become an example of all that can go wrong in economic terms with new reactors," and Areva and the TVO "are in bitter dispute over who will bear the cost overruns and there is a real risk now that the utility will default." The project has also been criticized by STUK because "instructions have not been observed in the welding of pipes and the supervision of welding." STUK has also noted that there have been delays in submitting proper paperwork.

Olkiluoto 3 was supposed to be the first reactor of 3+ generation which would pave the way for a new wave of identical reactors across Europe that were safe, affordable, and delivered on time. The delays and cost overruns have had knock-on effects in other countries.

The construction workforce included about 3,800 employees from 500 companies. 80% of the workers were foreigners, mostly from eastern European countries. In 2012, it was reported that one Bulgarian contracting firm is owned by the mafia, and that Bulgarian workers were required to pay weekly protection fees to the mafia, wages have been unpaid, employees have been told not to join a union and that employers also reneged on social security payments.

=== Project timeline ===
Main milestones of the project and other surrounding events
Date	Event
December 2000	TVO applies to the Finnish cabinet for a decision-in-principle on the new unit
17 January 2002	decision-in-principle by the Finnish cabinet
24 May 2002	the Finnish parliament approves the decision-in-principle
8 January 2004	TVO submits construction application to the Finnish cabinet
17 February 2005	the Finnish cabinet approves the construction application
July 2005	start of construction
May 2006	lifting and installation of the bottom part of containment liner
June 2007	reactor building containment liner rises to level +12.5 m
May 2008	fuel building APC shell completed
January 2009	Siemens withdraws from the joint venture with Areva, leaving the latter as the main contractor
January 2009	reactor pressure vessel and vessel head arrive on site
May 2009	main control room lifting in Safeguard Building 2
Summer 2009	polar crane installation, dome installation
Autumn 2009	steam generators arrive on site
September 2009	EPR dome installed
June 2010	installation of the reactor pressure vessel in the reactor building
June 2011	Anne Lauvergeon leaves her position as CEO of Areva
November 2011	installation of heavy components of the primary cooling system complete
July 2012	delay in start of production to no earlier than 2015 announced
December 2012	Areva estimates that the full cost of building the reactor will be about €8.5 billion, or almost three times the delivery price of €3 billion
February 2013	TVO said that it is "preparing for the possibility" that the third unit at Olkiluoto may not start operating until 2016
February 2014	Areva shutting down construction due to dispute over compensations and unfinished automation planning. Operation estimated to be delayed until 2018–2020.
September 2014	Areva announced it expected construction completion and commissioning to start in mid-2016, with operation expected to start in 2018. TVO stated they were surprised that commissioning was expected to take so long.
December 2015	The operational automation systems began to be delivered and installed. Commercial operation is estimated for December 2018.
January 2016	Testing of the operational automation systems begins.
April 2016	TVO submits operating license application to the Finnish government
October 2016	TVO calls on Siemens to take financial responsibility for the completion of the project because its project partner, the French Areva Group, is being broken up by the French government.
October 2017	The completion is delayed to May 2019 as announced by TVO.
December 2017	Hot functional testing begins.
February 2018	Fuel for the reactor is on site.
March 2018	TVO and Areva come to agreement on delays. Areva will pay €450 million in compensation.
30 May 2018	Hot functional tests completed.
June 2018	The completion is delayed to September 2019 due to delays in the hot functional testing.
November 2018	The completion is delayed to January 2020 due to commissioning tests taking longer than expected.
February 2019	STUK issued a statement stating that the power plant is safe and can be granted an operating license.
March 2019	The Finnish Government granted an operating license to the reactor.
April 2019	TVO indicated that the January 2020 deadline for production is expected to be pushed back by two months due to delays.
July 2019	Areva delays another 4 months to startup in July 2020.
November 2019	Further delays: updated schedule expected in December.
December 2019	Areva announces new schedule: connection to power grid in November 2020, commercial production in March 2021.
August 2020	Areva announces new schedule: fuel loading in March 2021, connection to power grid in October 2021, commercial production in February 2022.
March 2021	STUK grants fuel loading permit for the reactor.
April 2021	Finished loading of all 241 fuel assemblies to the reactor.
August 2021	Turbine refurbishment takes longer than expected, causing another delay of at least three months. Reactor start expected in January 2022, production of electricity in February 2022 and commercial production in June 2022.
December 2021	TVO applied for and was granted permission for startup, with production of electricity revised to start late January 2022.
December 2021	The reactor achieved criticality on 21 December 2021.
March 2022	Electricity production started on 12 March 2022.
May 2022	Foreign material found in the turbine steam reheater, and the plant was shut down for about three months of repair work.
30 September 2022	The reactor achieved its design output power.
16 April 2023	The plant began regular electricity production at 02:00 AM.
1 May 2023	The plant began commercial operation.

=== Operations ===
The first annual maintenance outage started on 2 March 2024, and was expected to take 37 days. The outage was delayed from the original plan due to the shutdown process and inspections of the fuel elements taking longer than expected, and technical problems identified during the maintenance. The outage lasted 74 days, and the plant resumed electricity production on 16 May.

=== Incidents ===
On 7 March 2025, during a maintenance outage from 1 March 2025 until early May. 100 cubic metres of radioactive coolant water leaked from the reactor into containment space rooms because a hatch in the reactor refueling pool had not been properly closed due to human error. TVO said "a significant operating event occurred during the maintenance work when radioactive coolant leaked ... the significance of the event to radiation safety was low".

== Unit 4 ==
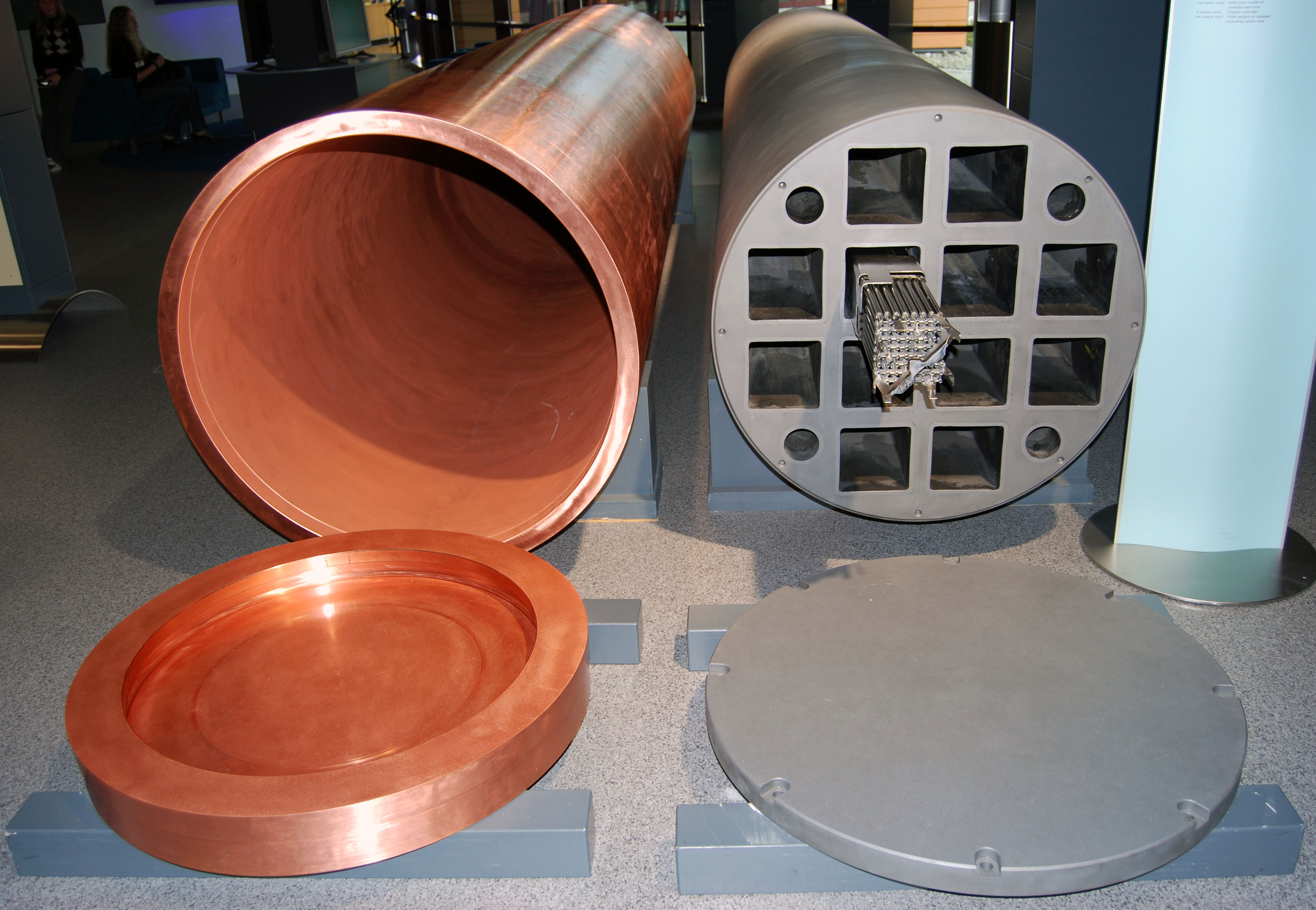
Final disposal capsule for waste nuclear fuel as shown at the Olkiluoto Nuclear Power Plant Visitor Centre

On 14 February 2008, TVO submitted an environmental impact assessment of unit four to the Ministry of Employment and Economy. On 21 April 2010, the government of Finland decided to grant a decision-in-principle to Teollisuuden Voima for the fourth reactor in Olkiluoto. The decision was approved by the parliament on 1 July 2010. If constructed, the fourth unit would be a PWR or a BWR with a power output of 1,000 to 1,800 MW.

In September 2014, with unit 3 still unfinished, the Finnish government rejected TVO's request for time extension of the unit 4 decision-in-principle. Economic Affairs Minister Jan Vapaavuori referred to the long delay of the 3rd reactor and to unsatisfactory assurances by TVO that the 4th unit would ever be built. Nevertheless PM Stubb stated that the rejection didn't spell the end for the OL4 project, and that TVO would have the opportunity to apply for a construction license before the decision-in-principle expires in June 2015.

In June 2015, TVO decided not to apply for a construction permit for the Olkiluoto 4 unit because of delays with unit 3, however saying they are prepared to file for a new decision-in-principle later.

== Onkalo spent nuclear fuel repository ==
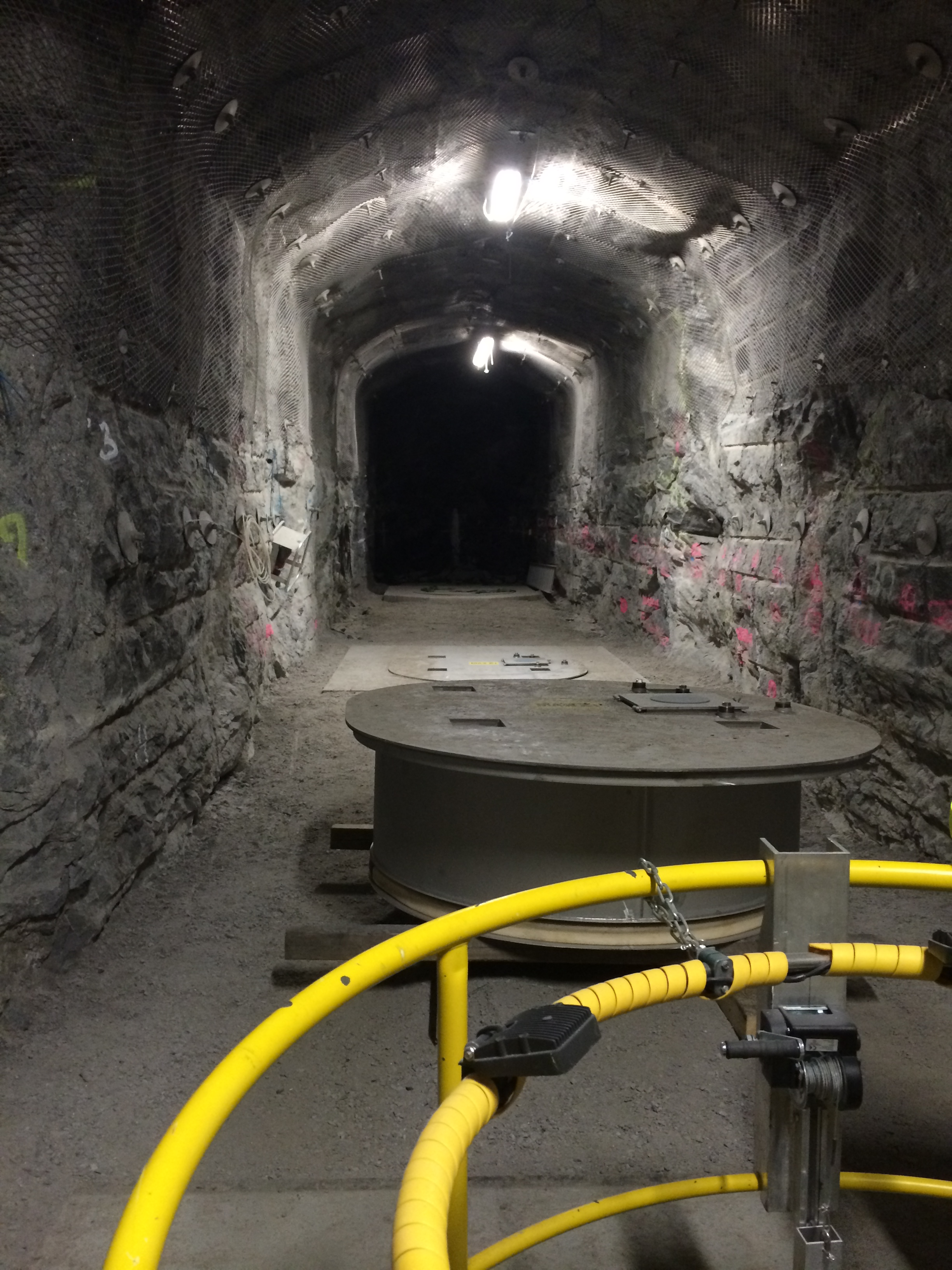
Onkalo pilot repository cave

The Onkalo spent nuclear fuel repository is a deep geological repository for the final disposal of spent nuclear fuel, the first such repository in the world. It is currently under construction at the Olkiluoto plant by the company Posiva, owned by the nuclear power plant operators Fortum and TVO.

== Agriculture ==
The waste heat, an output common to all thermal power plants, which heats the cooling water (at 13 °C) is utilized for small-scale agriculture before being pumped back to the sea. The power plant hosts the northernmost vineyard in the world, a 0.1 ha experimental plot that yields 850 kg Zilga grapes annually. Another use is a pond for growing crabs, whitefish and sturgeon for caviar.

== Incidents ==
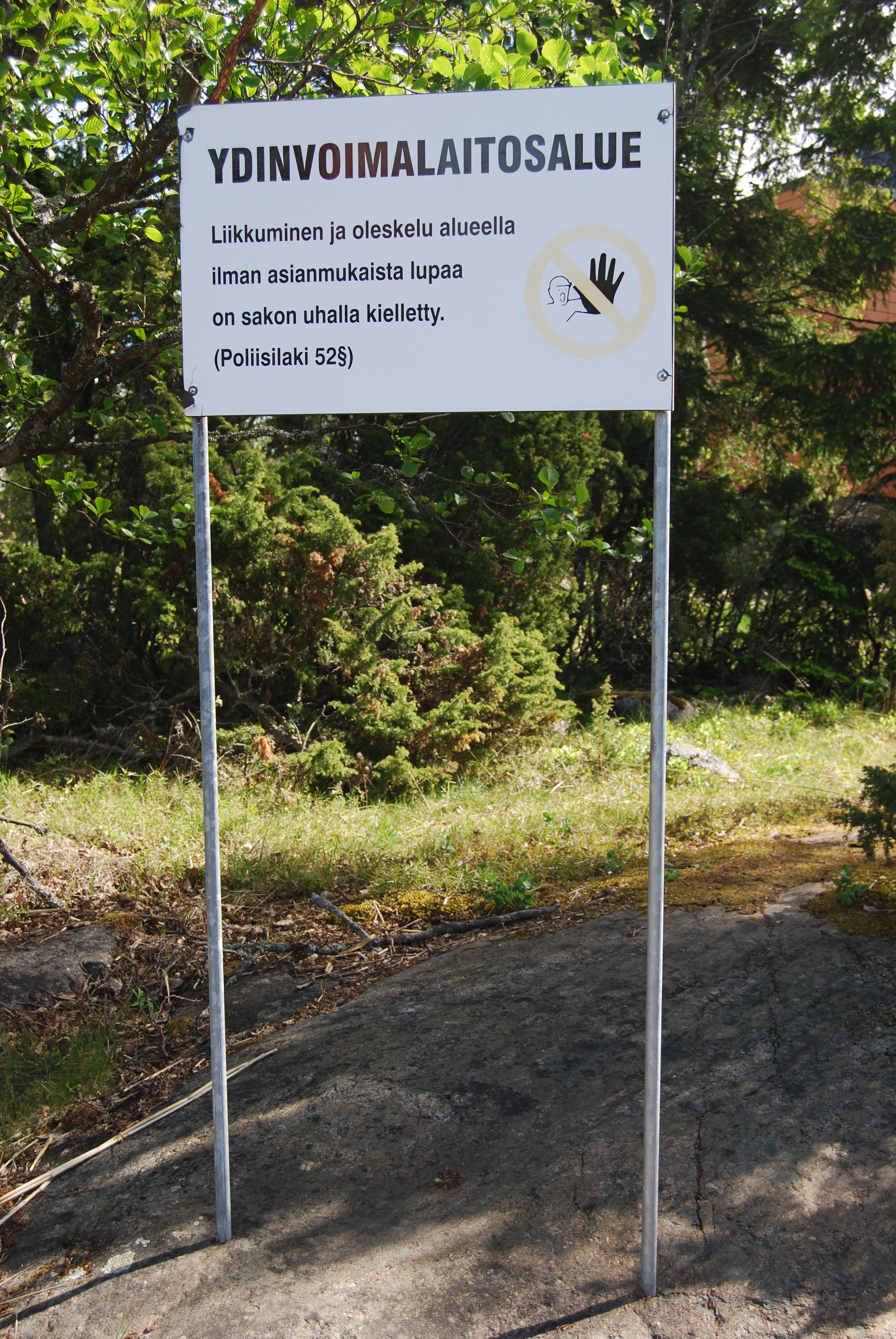
A sign near the Olkiluoto nuclear power plant says: "NUCLEAR POWER PLANT AREA. Moving and staying in the area without a proper permit is prohibited under threat of a fine. (Police Act § 52)"

In April 2014, a turbine steam condenser of unit 1 had a small seawater leak, at a rate of two litres per hour. According to the operator, the leak forced to limit the plant output down to 300 MW, but was not serious and was to be repaired in a day.

An incident occurred at unit 2 on 10 December 2020 at 12:22. Because of valve repair work, excessively hot water flowed to the reactor water clean-up system filters. The hot water dissolved materials from the filters. When the clean-up system was restarted, the dissolved materials flowed to the reactor core, where they became radioactive. This caused the radiation levels in the steam line to momentarily rise to 3–4 times higher than normal. The increase of the radiation level activated safety systems, which operated as planned and triggered reactor scram, closed containment isolation valves, and started the containment spray system. The operators followed procedures and declared a site area emergency at 12:32. The event caused a full-scale emergency response at the power plant and at the Radiation and Nuclear Safety Authority. There was no radioactive release to the environment, and the workers were not exposed to radiation. The event was categorized as 0 on the INES scale, which means that it was an exceptional event with no safety significance. The reactor was restarted on 19 December, nine days after the incident.

On 3 June 2024 at 11:41, electricity production of unit 3 was briefly interrupted due to a turbine malfunction. An immediate investigation found the cause to be a failure in the differential pressure measurement of the generator's sealing oil and hydrogen coolant. The unit returned to normal production on the following night. The incident had no impact on nuclear safety.

== See also ==
- Flamanville Nuclear Power Plant
- List of nuclear reactors in Finland
  - Hanhikivi Nuclear Power Plant
- Nuclear engineering
- Nuclear power in Finland
- Into Eternity, a 2010 documentary about the construction of a Finnish waste depository
