= FiR 1 =

Finnish nuclear reactor

Coordinates: 60°11′15.72″N 24°49′51.41″E

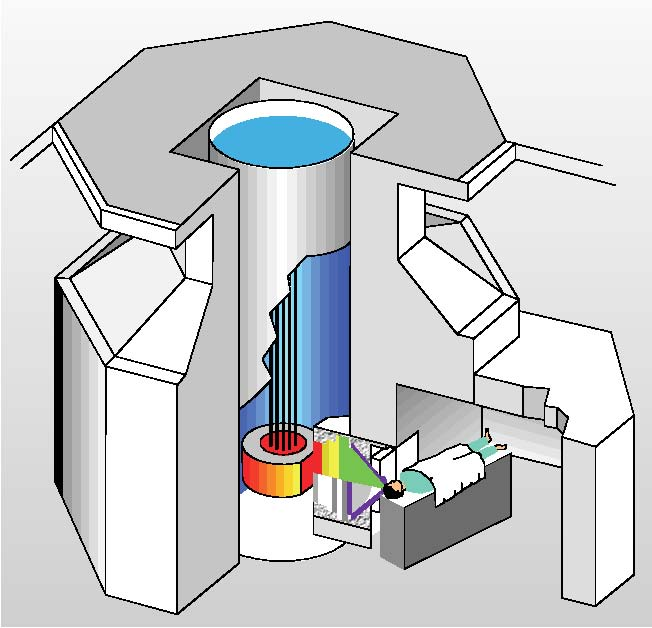
Boron neutron capture therapy facility at FiR 1.

FiR 1 (Finland Reactor 1; also sometimes referred to as Otaniemi research reactor, Otaniemi reactor, TKK reactor, or VTT reactor) was Finland's first nuclear reactor. It was a research reactor that was located in the Otaniemi campus area in the city of Espoo. It was a TRIGA Mark II reactor with a thermal power of 250 kilowatts. It started operation in 1962, and was permanently shut down in 2015. At first, the reactor was operated by Helsinki University of Technology (TKK), and since 1971 by VTT Technical Research Centre of Finland.

In addition to research, the reactor was used for production of radioactive isotopes for industrial measurements. It was used also for neutron activation analysis of geological and biological materials. Lunar soil samples from Apollo 12 were analyzed with FiR 1. Radiation damage to equipment has been investigated with the reactor. For example, magnetometers for the ITER fusion reactor have been irradiated with FiR 1. University students have performed exercises with the reactor. After the year 2000, the most significant use of the reactor was boron neutron capture therapy for patients with a cancer in the head or neck area.

== Technology ==
FiR 1 was a TRIGA Mark II reactor, manufactured by the US company General Atomics. The original thermal power of the reactor was 100 kilowatts. In 1967 the reactor was uprated to 250 kilowatts. The heat was not used for anything because the reactor was operated only a few hours a day.

The reactor core was at the bottom of a 6-metre-deep (20 ft) water pool that was open from the top. The water acted as a coolant, neutron moderator, and radiation protection. The diameter of the core was 44 centimetres (17 in) and height 36 centimetres (14 in). There was about 15 kilograms (33 lb) of uranium in the core.

The reactor had 79 fuel rods. The fuel material was uranium zirconium hydride (UZrH), which was 8–12% of uranium. The fuel enrichment was 20% uranium-235. There was a graphite reflector above, below, and around the reactor core. The reflector scattered back into the core some of the neutrons that escaped from the core. The reactor pool was surrounded by a concrete biological shield, which acted as a radiation protection in the horizontal direction. The reactor had four control rods made of boron carbide.

A feature of the fuel material, uranium zirconium hydride, is a strong negative feedback between the temperature and the reactivity. As a result, an uncontrolled chain reaction is physically impossible. The strong feedback could be utilized for generating power pulses. A control rod was ejected from the core with pressurized air, raising the reactor power thousand-fold, to 250 megawatts. This caused an increase in the fuel temperature, and the negative feedback stopped the chain reaction. A power pulse lasted only 30 milliseconds.

== History ==
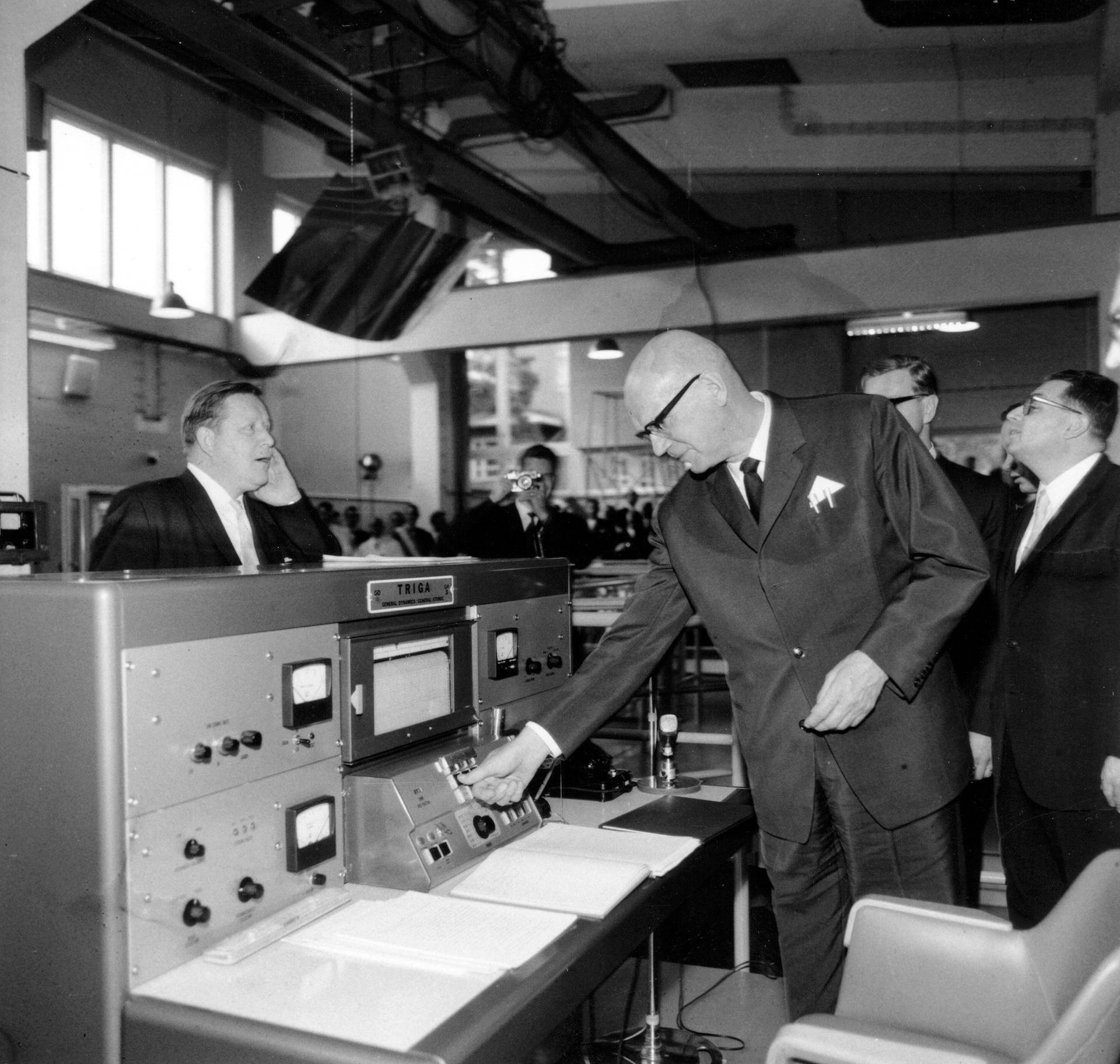
President Urho Kekkonen starting FiR 1 in 1962.

A contract for buying the research reactor was signed in 1960. The most active people behind the acquisition were Pekka Jauho, Erkki Laurila, and Heikki Lehtonen. The research-reactor project was preparation for constructing a nuclear power plant in Finland. A research reactor was needed for training of personnel for the power reactors.

FiR 1 started operation in 1962. In 1967 its power was uprated from 100 to 250 kilowatts. At first, the reactor was operated by Helsinki University of Technology. In 1971 the Finnish government transferred the reactor to VTT Technical Research Centre of Finland. The reactor building and the land are owned by Aalto University Campus & Real Estate.

A boron neutron capture therapy (BNCT) facility was constructed next to the reactor in the 1990s. Over 300 cancer patient irradiations were given in 1999–2011. The patients showed improved tumor control and survival. The company that organized the therapy, Boneca Ltd., went bankrupt in January 2012. Then VTT decided to shut down the reactor because its operation cost about €500,000 per year. The reactor was permanently shut down in 2015 by removing several fuel rods from the core.

== Dismantling ==
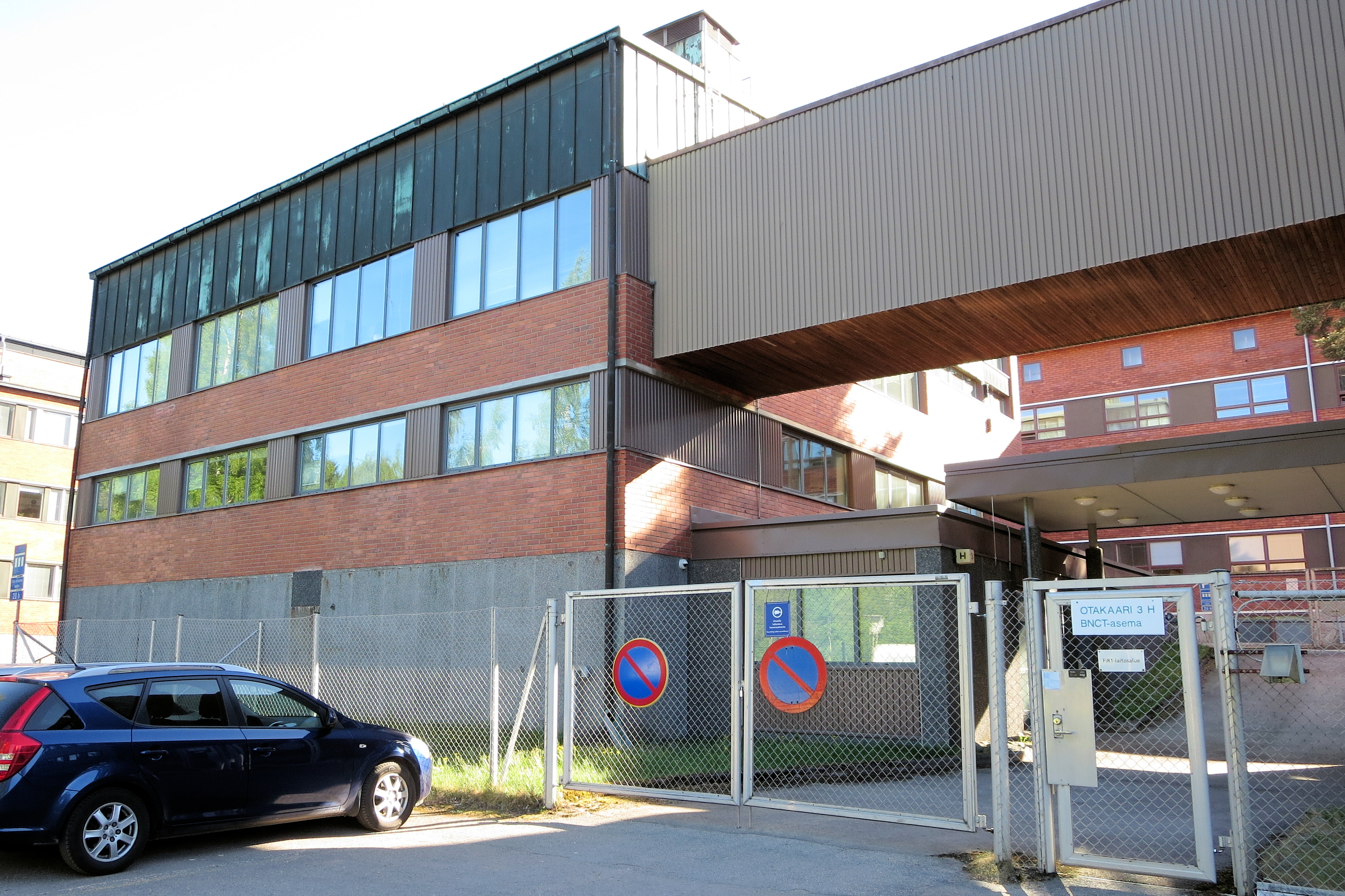
Reactor building of FiR 1

The first step in the dismantling project was removing the fuel from the reactor. Then other radioactive parts (internal parts of the core, the reactor pool, the concrete biological shield, BNCT facility, and the primary cooling circuit) were dismantled. The spent fuel and most parts of the reactor core are high-level waste. Other radioactive dismantling waste is classified as low- and intermediate-level waste. The goal was to limit the collective radiation dose to the dismantling staff to 10 milliman-sieverts. The reactor building was cleaned so that there are no limitations to its future use.

There were a total of 103 spent fuel rods in the reactor building. They contained 21.4 kilograms (47 lb) of uranium in total. The reactor used very little fuel because its power was so low and it operated only a few hours a day. Some of the fuel rods were in the reactor for its entire 53-year operating time. The spent fuel did not need cooling because its decay heat power was so low. In addition to the spent fuel, 24 unused fuel rods were stored in the building. They contained 5.7 kilograms (13 lb) of uranium in total.

The FiR 1 fuel originated from the United States, and it belonged to the U.S. Foreign Research Reactor Spent Nuclear Fuel Acceptance program. The program is intended to prevent proliferation of nuclear materials. Finland's Nuclear Energy Act prohibits export of nuclear waste. However, the law has an exception, according to which the prohibition does not apply to waste from a research reactor. In February 2021, the fuel of the reactor was transported to Denver, where the United States Geological Survey will use the fuel for several years in its reactor. Then the United States will take care of the spent fuel in Idaho National Laboratory. Most of the dangerous radioactivity of the used fuel will vanish in a thousand years (but some level of radioactivity will survive for much longer).

Fortum was the main contractor in the dismantling of the reactor, which began in June 2023 and was finished in April 2024. The total cost of the decommissioning was about €24 million. The dismantling of the reactor generated about 60 cubic metres (2,100 cu ft) of low- and intermediate-level waste, mainly concrete. Because the reactor was small, the amount of waste generated was also small, especially when compared to the amount of waste from decommissioning of a full-size nuclear power plant. The dismantling waste was transported to the low- and intermediate-level waste final repository in Loviisa and placed in Finnish bedrock. The decommissioning waste was packaged into concrete boxes for final disposal; since the decommissioning waste does not contain long-lived radioactive isotopes, the packages are designed to last only at least 500 years.

FiR 1 was Finland's first nuclear facility to be dismantled. The lessons learned from the research reactor dismantling project will be used for preparation of the decommissioning of Finnish nuclear power plants. In 2018, the Finnish government decided to give VTT a €13.5-million special grant for dismantling the research reactor. The Council of State of Finland granted a decommissioning license (required by Finnish nuclear law) in June 2021. After the reactor and related components were dismantled, the reactor building was decontaminated and, after thorough checks and measurements to ensure that the building was safe radiation-wise, the building was released to use for other purposes. Before the dismantling work of the reactor started, the reactor building was not contaminated and its radiation level was the same as the background radiation level. Many Finnish buildings are exposed to much higher levels of radiation than the reactor building, due to natural sources such as the bedrock (especially radon gas) or building materials (e.g. granite). There was no soil contamination at the site of the reactor before dismantling and demolition work began.

In December 2025, the Radiation and Nuclear Safety Authority (STUK) made the decision to release the reactor, reactor building and an adjoined material research laboratory from radiation control and supervision. After this decision, the facility is no longer considered a nuclear or radiation facility and in the aspect of radiation safety the facility or its neighboring area are of no particular relevance. The facility or its surroundings do not differ from normal built-up area. The reactor building can be taken into other (general) use. The STUK's decision, and the facility and its surroundings, will furthermore be inspected by European Commission and IAEA inspectors in 2026.
