= Nuclear power in Finland =

Nuclear power plants in Finland (view)
Active plants
Unfinished plants

As of 2024, Finland has five operating nuclear reactors in two power plants, all located on the shores of the Baltic Sea. Nuclear power provided about 40% of the country's electricity generation in 2024. The first research nuclear reactor in Finland was commissioned in 1962 and the first commercial reactor started operation in 1977. The fifth reactor (Olkiluoto Unit 3) started operation in April 2023. In 2025, nuclear power produced approximately 40% of the country’s electricity.

Finland's nuclear reactors are among the world's most productive, with an average capacity factor of 95% in the 2010s.

== Operational power plants ==
=== Reactors ===
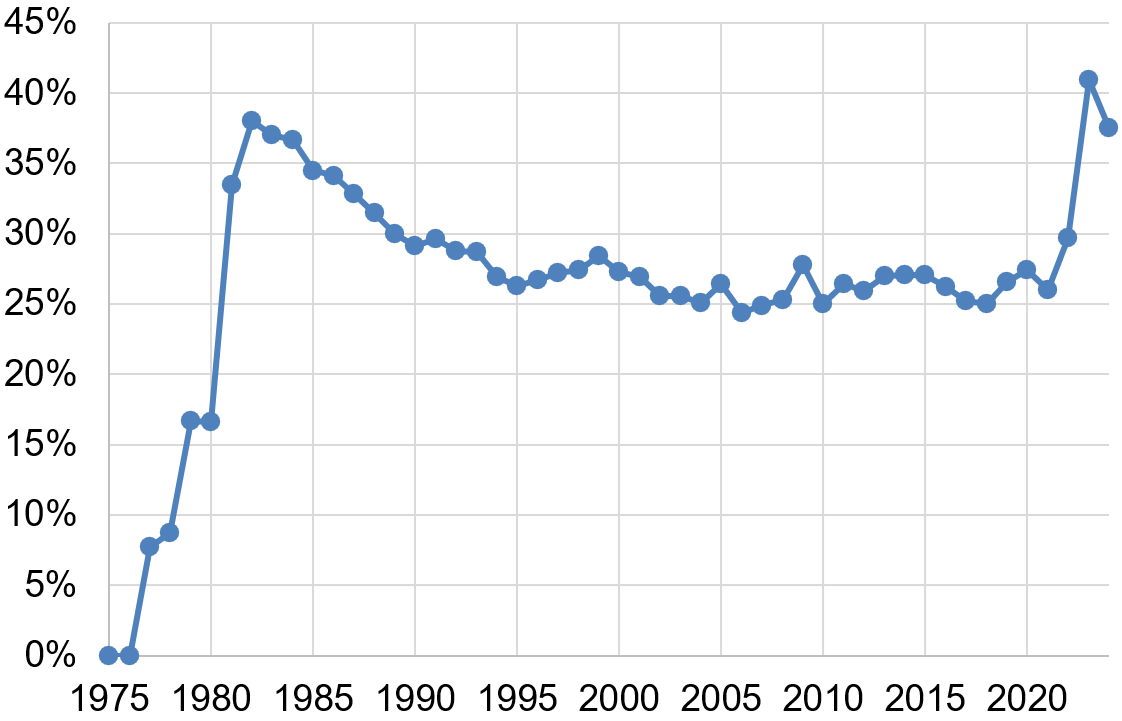
Share of nuclear power of Finland's electricity consumption, 1975–2024.

Site	Unit	Reactor type	Net electric power (MW)	Supplier	Start-up
Loviisa Nuclear Power Plant	LO1	VVER-440/V-213 (PWR)	507	Atomenergoexport	1977
Loviisa Nuclear Power Plant	LO2	VVER-440/V-213 (PWR)	507	Atomenergoexport	1980
Olkiluoto Nuclear Power Plant	OL1	ASEA-III, BWR-2500 (BWR)	890	ASEA-Atom	1978
Olkiluoto Nuclear Power Plant	OL2	ASEA-III, BWR-2500 (BWR)	890	ASEA-Atom	1980
Olkiluoto Nuclear Power Plant	OL3	EPR (PWR)	1600	Areva S.A.	2023
Total			4394		

=== Loviisa plant ===
Located in Loviisa, on the south coast (Gulf of Finland), the plant comprises two VVER-440 pressurized water reactors built by Soviet Atomenergoexport, but fitted with Western instrumentation, containment structures and control systems. The plant is owned and operated by Fortum. Electrical production started in 1977 and 1980, with the reactors now producing 507 MWe each. On 26 July 2007 new licenses were granted to Fortum to operate the units until 2027 and 2030, conditional on safety reviews before 2015 and 2023.

=== Olkiluoto plant ===
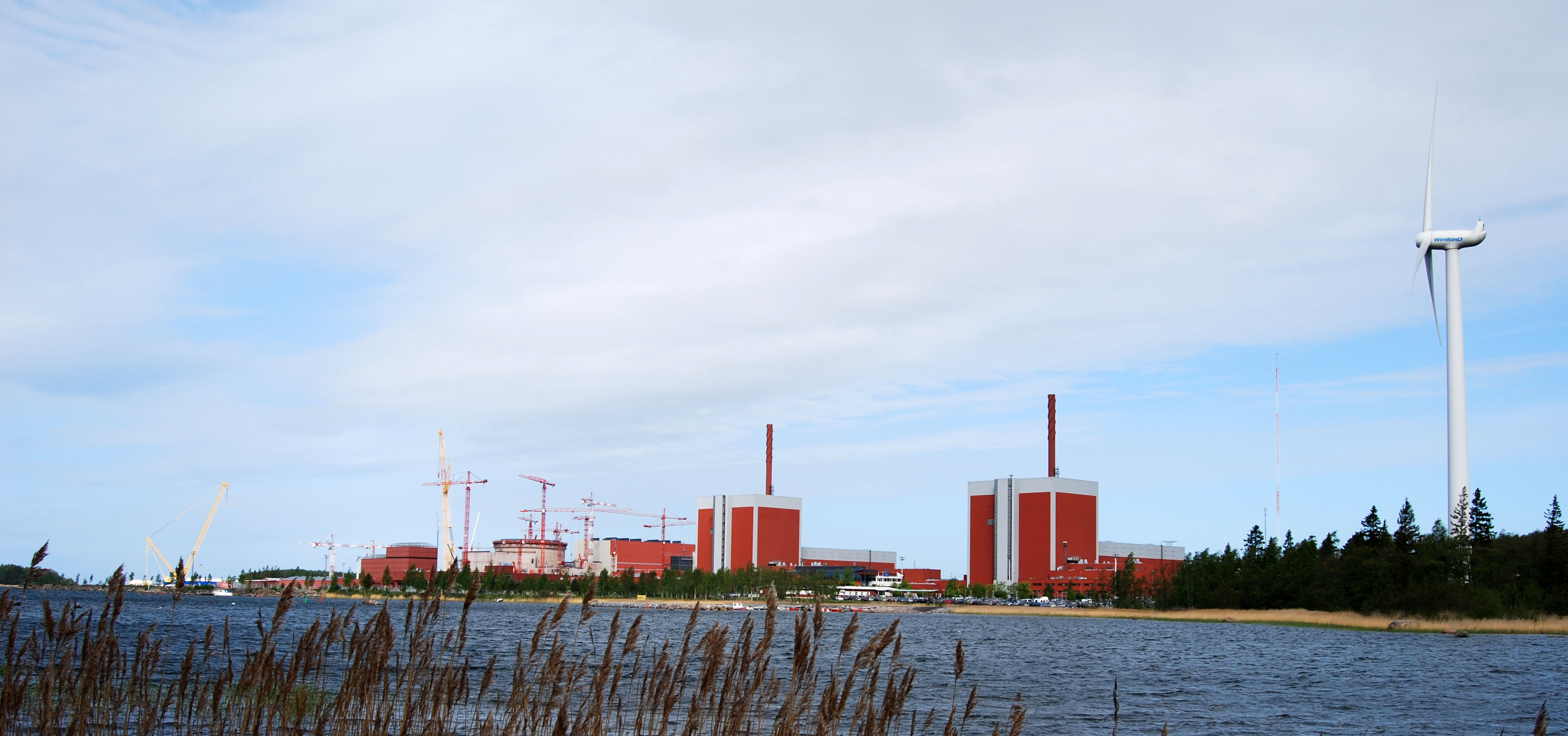
Olkiluoto Nuclear Power Plant.

The Olkiluoto plant is owned by Teollisuuden Voima (TVO), and is located in Eurajoki, on the west coast, near Rauma. It has two boiling water reactors currently producing 890 MWe each. They were built by the Swedish company Asea-Atom (nowadays ABB), and went online in 1978 and 1980.

Areva has built a third reactor at the Olkiluoto site for a total cost of price of over €8.5 billion. It is a European Pressurized Reactor (EPR), and has a power output of 1,600 MWe. The reactor was originally scheduled to start production in 2009, but was delayed by 14 years. Regular electricity production started in April 2023.

== Decommissioned reactors ==
=== Otaniemi research reactor, FiR 1 ===
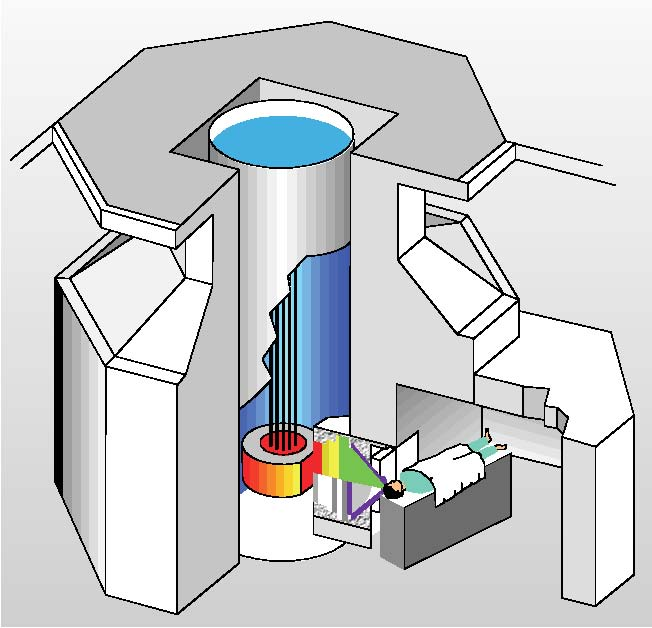
Boron neutron capture therapy facility at FiR 1.

FiR 1 was a small research reactor located in Otaniemi, Espoo; a TRIGA Mark II, built for the Helsinki University of Technology in 1962. Owned by the VTT Technical Research Centre of Finland since 1971, it had a power output of 250 kW. It was mainly used in boron neutron capture therapy and research. The reactor was permanently shut down on 30 June 2015. In 2021, the spent fuel was transported to the United States Geological Survey, which will use the fuel in its research reactor in Denver. The Council of State granted a decommissioning license in June 2021. The decommissioning work ended in April 2024. The decommissioned nuclear site (reactor building) was released to unrestricted use as a "greenfield" site.

== Regulation and safety ==
Under the Nuclear Energy Act 1987 the Ministry of Economic Affairs and Employment (Finnish: Työ- ja elinkeinoministeriö, TEM) is responsible for supervision of nuclear power operation and for waste disposal.

The Radiation and Nuclear Safety Authority (Finnish: Säteilyturvakeskus, STUK) is responsible for regulation and inspection. It operates under the Council of State (effectively the government), which licenses major nuclear facilities. STUK is under the Ministry of Social Affairs and Health, and is assisted by an Advisory Committee on Nuclear Safety in major matters.

=== Licensing of new reactors ===
Licensing of a new nuclear power plant in Finland involves four main steps. First the license applicant has to draw up an environmental impact assessment. In the second phase the applicant applies for a decision in principle. The decision is made by the Finnish government, after which the parliament votes on ratifying it. In this phase the city council of the municipality has a veto right, and it can stop the project. The third step is the construction license, and the fourth step is the operating license. These licenses are decided by the government, but a statement on safety is issued by STUK, and STUK has a veto right on the licenses. The operating license is always granted for a definite duration. STUK may interrupt the operation of a nuclear power plant if so required in order to ensure safety.

== New construction ==
=== Reactors ===
Site	Unit	Reactor type	Power generation	Constructor	Commission date
Olkiluoto Nuclear Power Plant	OL3	EPR (PWR)	1600 MW	Areva S.A.-Siemens AG	April 2023
Hanhikivi Nuclear Power Plant	1	VVER-1200/V-491 (PWR)	1200 MW	RAOS Project	Canceled 2 May 2022

=== Fifth reactor ===
A cabinet decision in 2002 to allow the construction of a fifth nuclear reactor was accepted in parliament. The Green League, which was principally opposed to the expansion of nuclear power and which held the position of the Minister of Environment, left the coalition government on 31 May 2002 in protest of the cabinet's decision, narrowing the majority of the coalition in the parliament. Economic, energy security and environmental grounds were given as reasons to build the fifth reactor. While hydroelectricity is curtailed in dry years (range 9,455–14,865 GWh 1990–2006), nuclear energy supplies near-constant amounts of energy, and studies showed that nuclear energy was the cheapest option for Finland. The vote was seen as very significant for nuclear energy policy in that it was the first decision to build a new nuclear power plant in western Europe for more than a decade.

Teollisuuden Voima (TVO) ordered the 1600 MW nuclear reactor (Olkiluoto 3) in 2003. The suppliers were the French company Areva NP (formerly Framatome) and the German company Siemens, which owned 34% of Areva NP. The price was fixed at €3.2 billion and completion was scheduled for 2009. The construction of this plant is now substantially behind schedule and over cost. As of 2010, Areva expected to lose €2.3 billion ($3.2 billion) on the project. As of August 2020, the expected start of commercial operation was in February 2022. In March 2022 electricity production started, with regular operation planned for July. In April, however, the commercial operation was reported to be postponed to September 2022. In June, the commercial operation was postponed to December 2022, and later until March 2023.

According to World Nuclear Association 2008: ”Experience has shown that each year of additional delay in the construction of a nuclear power plants adds another estimated $1 billion to the cost”.

Siemens sold its share of Areva NP to Areva in January 2009 for €2.1 billion. In June 2010, the European Union began an investigation of Areva and Siemens for anti-trust violations in nuclear cooperation. The European Commission lists the publications related to the case.

=== Sixth reactor ===
On 21 April 2010, the Government of Finland decided to grant permits for construction of the sixth and seventh commercial reactors to Teollisuuden Voima and Fennovoima, a joint venture between RAOS Voima Oy, a subsidiary of Rusatom, and SF energy, a consortium of Finnish industrial companies. The application by Fortum to build a new reactor at Loviisa was declined. The Finnish Parliament approved the building permits on 1 July 2010.

As in 2002, the Green League was principally opposed to nuclear power and represented in the coalition government, holding the positions of the Minister of Justice and the Minister of Labour. This time the party had publicly stated before the parliamentary election in March 2007 that it would not leave a coalition it had agreed to join, even if the other parties in that coalition decided to license further reactors. The party viewed the 2002 decision to expand nuclear power with several new reactors as the principal one, and the 2010 decision as simply a question of which operators to grant the permits to. The Green League voted against all new permits in the cabinet, and lost the vote.

In October 2011, Fennovoima announced that it had chosen Pyhäjoki, in northern Finland, as the site for the country's third nuclear power plant. The project was delayed by several years. On 24 February 2022, Russian forces, acting on orders from President Putin, have begun a major war of aggression against Ukraine in violation of international law. In May 2022, Fennovoima terminated its contract with Rosatom to build the power plant. In April 2026, it was announced that the Finnish real estate investment company Trevian would purchase a former nuclear power plant site from Fennovoima, and an American nuclear power company Westinghouse Electric Company would then design and build a nuclear power plant in Pyhäjoki.

On 25 September 2014 after TVO's repeated delays in building the third reactor and its failure to begin work on the fourth reactor in time, the government refused TVO's application for a further extension to the permit for the fourth reactor. For not seeking building permission by June 2015 for the fourth Olkiluoto reactor, TVO's permit granted in 2010 was terminated.

In March 2017, support of Fennovoima nuclear power was 26% among Finnish citizens, according to Taloustutkimus.

== Nuclear fuel ==
In 2009, Finland imported nuclear fuel from Sweden (40%), Russia (18%), Germany (2%) and other countries (40%). In 2006 the other country source of nuclear fuel was Spain.

Talvivaara Mining Company applied for uranium mining permission on 20 April 2010. This was the first uranium application in the history of Finland. According to the Ministry of Trade, the EIA process on the application would run until 31 March 2011. However, on 31 March, the application was supplemented. In February 2011, Talvivaara sold its uranium mining rights through 2027 to the Canadian company Cameco.

== Nuclear waste ==
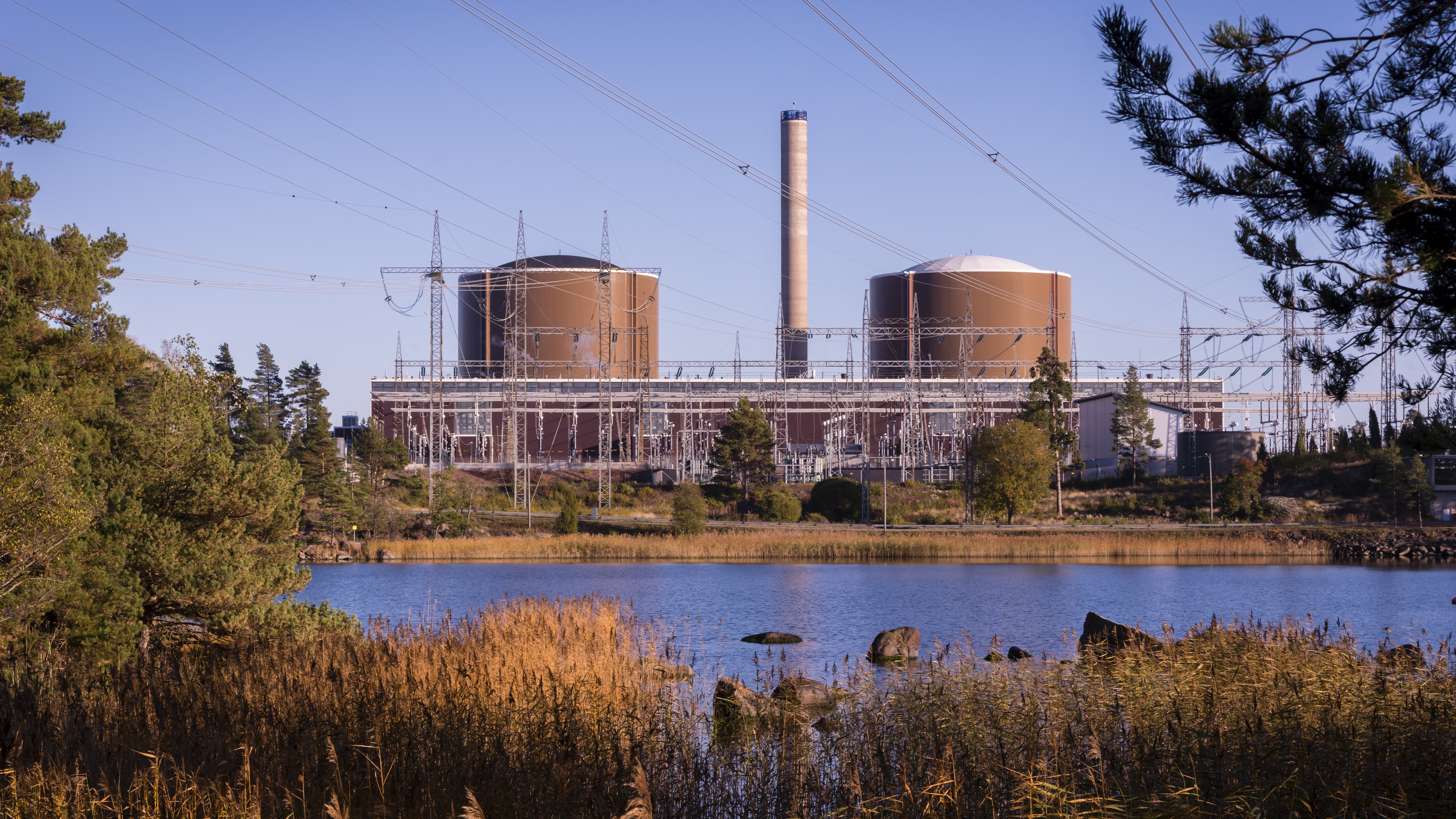
Loviisa Nuclear Power Plant

Spent fuel from the Loviisa Nuclear Power Plant was initially shipped to the Soviet Union for reprocessing. After news of the 1957 Kyshtym disaster at the Mayak nuclear fuel reprocessing plant was made public in 1976, this option was no longer seen as politically acceptable. The Finnish Nuclear Energy Act was amended in 1994 so that all nuclear waste produced in Finland must be disposed of in Finland. All spent fuel will be permanently buried in bedrock.

The Onkalo spent nuclear fuel repository at Olkiluoto was selected in 2000 to become the world's first deep geological repository of spent nuclear fuel. It will store the spent fuel from the plants owned by the utilities Fortum and TVO, that is, from the Loviisa and Olkiluoto sites. A documentary film about the waste repository has been made: Into Eternity.

== Political stance ==
The major parliamentary political parties in Finland have considered support or opposition to nuclear power as an issue that is left to each individual MP to decide. The National Coalition, the Finns Party, the Centre Party and the Social Democrats has included a supportive stance in their party platform. The Green League was strongly anti-nuclear until the 2010s, but has later relaxed its opinion. In 2020 party platform of the Green League no longer excluded construction of new nuclear power plants. In 2022, the Green League advocated for a technology-neutral palette of energy sources, and letting the decision on the need for nuclear power to be left to the industrial companies, while the government decides where new stations should be built and by whom. The Left Alliance and the Swedish People's Party explicitly oppose nuclear power in their platform, as well as most of the small parliamentary parties.

In a 2008 survey, the production of nuclear electricity was supported by 61% of the Finnish public, while the EU average was 44%.

Finnish energy industry association Finnish Energy has followed the public opinion yearly on their part. According to their data the public opinion towards the nuclear energy has slowly but steadily grown more positive all the way from the 1980s until 2015.

Two polls from December 2017 showed support for both nuclear power in Finland in general, as well as local support for the Fennovoima Hanhikivi plant. 37% of the respondents supported and 29% opposed additional construction of nuclear power to the country.

== See also ==
- Energy in Finland
- Renewable energy in Finland
- List of commercial nuclear reactors#Finland
