= Tuure Mäntynen =

Finnish footballer (born 2000)

Personal information
- Date of birth: 17 January 2000 (age 26)
- Place of birth: Eurajoki, Finland
- Height: 1.75 m (5 ft 9 in)
- Position: Defender

Youth career
- FC Jazz
- 2017–2020: Kaiserslautern

Senior career*
Years	Team	Apps	(Gls)
2015–2016	FC Jazz	19	(0)
2020–2021	Ilves	10	(0)

International career^{‡}
2016	Finland U16	3	(0)
2015–2016	Finland U17	13	(0)
2017	Finland U18	3	(0)
2017–2018	Finland U19	8	(0)
- * Club domestic league appearances and goals as of 13 February 2021 ‡ National team caps and goals as of 13 October 2018

Tuure Vihtori Mäntynen (born 17 January 2000) is a Finnish footballer.

== Career ==
At the age of 15, Mäntynen debuted for Jazz in the Finnish second division.

In 2017, he signed for German second division side Kaiserslautern after trialing for Reading and Stoke City in England.

In 2020, he signed for Finnish top flight team Ilves.
