= Hanhikivi Nuclear Power Plant =

Proposed nuclear power plant in Finland

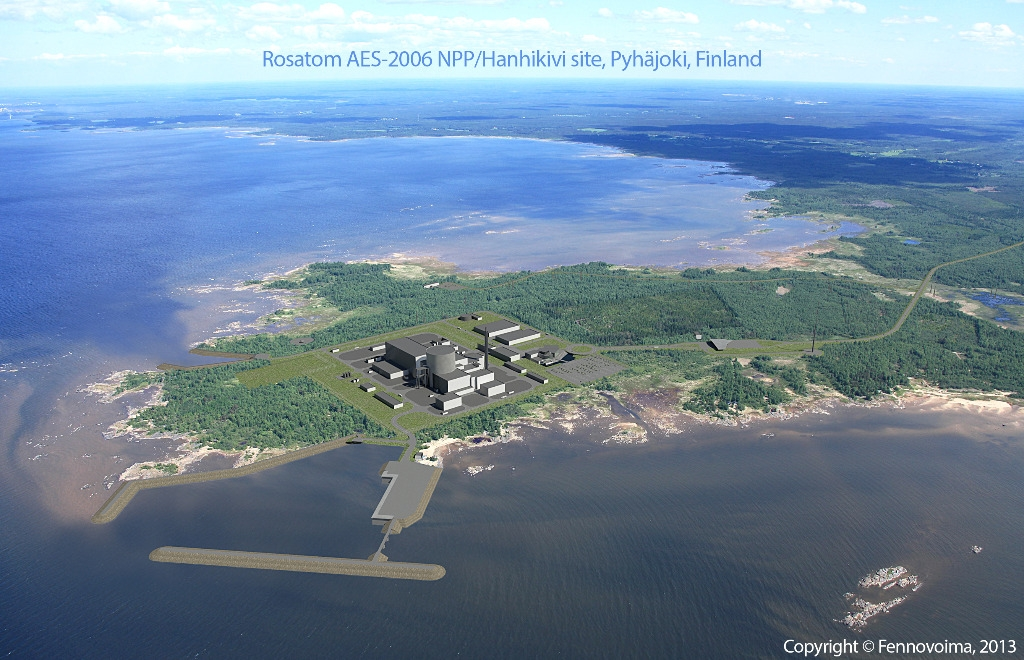
- Country: Finland
- Location: Pyhäjoki
- Coordinates: 64°31′51″N 24°15′21″E
- Status: Cancelled
- Commission date: 2028
- Owner: Fennovoima
- Operator: Fennovoima

Nuclear power station
- Reactor type: PWR
- Reactor supplier: Atomstroyexport (OKB Gidropress)
- Thermal capacity: 1 × 3200 MW_{th}

Power generation
- Make and model: VVER-1200/491
- Units planned: 1 × 1200 MW
- Nameplate capacity: 1200 MW (planned)

External links
- Website: Hanhikivi 1
- Commons: Related media on Commons

The Hanhikivi Nuclear Power Plant (Finnish: Hanhikiven ydinvoimalaitos, Swedish: Hanhikivi kärnkraftverk) was a project to build a nuclear power plant on the Finnish Hanhikivi peninsula, in the municipality of Pyhäjoki. It was planned to house one Russian-designed VVER-1200 pressurised water reactor, with a capacity of 1200 MW. It was estimated that the reactor would supply 10% of Finland's energy demand by 2024. The power company Fennovoima announced in April 2021 that construction of the plant would begin in 2023 and commercial operation would start in 2029. In May 2022, in the wake of the Russian invasion of Ukraine, Fennovoima terminated its contract with Rosatom to build the power plant.

== Description ==
In June 2007, a consortium of 67 companies established a company named Fennovoima Oy to construct a new nuclear power plant. On 21 April 2010, the Finnish Government decided to grant a permit (decision-in-principle) to Fennovoima for construction of a nuclear reactor. The decision was approved by the Parliament on 1 July 2010.

The chosen plant model was Rosatom's pressurised water reactor AES-2006 which was the latest evolution of VVER plant designs at the time. The other bidders for the project were Areva and Toshiba. Fennovoima began direct negotiations with Rosatom in April 2013. On 21 December 2013, Fennovoima and Rosatom Overseas, a subsidiary of Rosatom, signed a plant supply contract. It was announced that the plant should be commissioned by 2024.

On 28 July 2016, Rosatom signed a contract with Alstom Power Systems (part of General Electric) for the design and supply of turbine generator equipment package ("conventional island") as well as advisory services for installation and commissioning works. The turbine generator equipment will be based on Alstom's Arabelle technology. On 8 June 2017, Fennovoima announced that the plant's main automation would be supplied by Rolls-Royce and Schneider Electric. Rolls-Royce is also the supplier of automation modernisation for the Loviisa Nuclear Power Plant. However, Rolls-Royce withdrew from the Hanhikivi project in the autumn of 2018. In October 2019, Framatome and Siemens were chosen as the automation suppliers.

On 28 February 2014, Voimaosakeyhtiö SF made the final decision to participate in Fennovoima's nuclear power plant construction. The final investment decision would be made in 2014. The ownership was assured in August 2015. The plant was estimated to cost "less than €50/MWh (5 cents/kWh), including all production costs, depreciation, finance costs and waste management".

As of October 2017, some of the debt financing was still under negotiation.

On 21 December 2018, Fennovoima announced that it had received a new schedule to receive the construction license and start construction of the plant in 2021. The commercial operation should start in 2028.

In April 2021, Fennovoima announced that bringing the design and licensing material to the level of Finnish requirements has taken longer than expected. The company estimated that it could obtain the construction license in 2022 and that construction of the power plant would begin in 2023. Commercial operation of the plant would begin in 2029.

== Political impact ==
As the power plant would have generated 10% of Finland's electricity demand and Rosatom would have owned 34% of the plant, this would have meant that Rosatom would have supplied 3% of Finland's electricity production according to Veli-Pekka Tynkkynen, professor of Russian energy politics at the University of Helsinki. He argued that Russia could use the reactor to for instance manipulate Nordic power prices, or use it as leverage in political disputes as Russia already uses its gas supply in disputes with neighbouring countries such as Ukraine. According to researcher Martin Kragh at Uppsala University in Sweden, Russia applied pressure to keep the project going by leveraging Fortum's investments in Russia. In 2018, Fortum expanded its interests in Russia by acquiring Uniper.

== Cancellation ==
In March 2022, in light of the Russian invasion of Ukraine, the Finnish Government declared that a rapid independence from Russian energy production is desired, and that the construction of the plant should not continue. Mika Lintilä, Finland's Minister of Economic Affairs, declared that he would not issue a construction permit. In May 2022, Fennovoima terminated its contract with Rosatom to build the power plant, citing significant delays and Rosatom's "inability to deliver the project". The war in Ukraine had further exacerbated the risks of the project.

In December 2022, the contract's Dispute Review Board, following International Chamber of Commerce rules, determined that Fennovoima's cancellation was unlawful, though this is subject to appeal (notices of dissatisfaction). Rosatom has a $3 billion claim against Fennovoima, and Fennovoima has a $2 billion claim against Rosatom, which will be determined by later proceedings.

== See also ==
- Energy in Finland
- Nuclear power in Finland
