= Antti Vuorinen =

Finnish physicist

Antti Pauli Uolevi Vuorinen (8 March 1932 – 27 July 2011) was a Finnish physicist.

He was born in Hämeenlinna. He was employed by the Radiation and Nuclear Safety Authority from 1958, then working as an engineer at the Helsinki University of Technology from 1961 to 1971, taking his doctorate degree in 1969. He then returned to the Radiation and Nuclear Safety Authority as assisting director, and became director with the professor title in 1975. From 1987 to 1997 he was the director-general of the Radiation and Nuclear Safety Authority. He died in July 2011 in Lammi.
