= Ernesti =

Ernesti is a surname. Notable people with the surname include:

- Johann August Ernesti (1707–1781), German Rationalist theologian and philologist
- Johann Christian Gottlieb Ernesti (1756–1802), German classical scholar
- Johann Heinrich Ernesti (1652–1729), German philosopher, Lutheran theologian, Latin classicist and poet

== See also ==
- Ernesti Rikhard Rainesalo (1864–1929), Finnish politician
