= Eurelectric =

Pan-European energy organisation

- Union of the Electricity Industry - Eurelectric aisbl
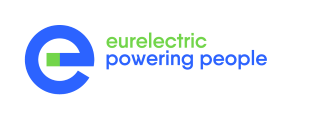
- Formation: 1989
- Type: Industry association
- Purpose: To represent the common interests of the electricity industry at pan-European level
- Headquarters: Blvd. de l'Impératrice, 66; Brussels, Belgium
- Region served: Europe
- Members: National electricity industry associations
- Official language: English
- Secretary General: Kristian Ruby
- President: Leonhard Birnbaum (E.ON)
- Vice President: Markus Rauramo (Fortum)
- Vice President: Georgios Stassis (Public Power Corporation)
- Main organ: Board of Directors
- Website: www.eurelectric.org

Eurelectric (full name: The Union of the Electricity Industry) is the sector association which represents the common interests of the electricity industry at a European level, plus its affiliates and associates on several other continents. Together these organisations employ 970,000 people in the European Union and have a turnover of €627 billion. Formally established in 1989, Eurelectric covers all major issues affecting the sector, from generation and markets to distribution networks and customer issues.

Eurelectric’s main objectives are the realisation of a carbon-neutral electricity mix in Europe well before mid-century and the development of energy efficiency and electrification to mitigate climate change.

Eurelectric hosts the Power Summit, an annual conference dedicated to European energy policy.

In 2024, Eurelectric reported a turnover of approximately €6,067,000.

== Organizational structure ==
Eurelectric is led by a President and two Vice Presidents, who are elected to two-year terms, and a Board of Directors. The Secretary-General leads the Secretariat, which consists of several organisational units employing an international staff of approximately forty people. There are five professional committees and about twenty working groups. Eurelectric is a signatory to the EU Transparency Register.

== Recognition ==
Eurelectric has attracted accolades for its engagement on climate files, with InfluenceMap, an independent think tank, saying in July 2021:

“Research examining the recent engagement of 20 major industry associations with the European Commission's Fit for 55 package found that the power sector had increasingly supported ambitious EU climate policies. Eurelectric, the principal EU-level representative of the electricity industry, was identified as a prominent advocate alongside organizations focused on renewable energy.”

It has also been recognised by its peers as a leading association winning the following awards:

- Best Data Visualisation, Lens Video Awards 2023
- Best Online Conference/Event, International & European Association Awards 2021
- Best Communications Campaign, International & European Association Awards 2020

== Publications ==
Each year Eurelectric produces several policy papers covering a variety of the issues concerning the electricity industry, these can be produced by Eurelectric’s Secretariat and membership or in partnership with external partners.

Recent publications include:

- E-quality: Shaping an inclusive energy transition (June 2020)
- Ports: Green gateways to Europe (July 2020)
- Connecting the dots: Distribution grid investment to power the energy transition (January 2021)
- Accelerating fleet electrification in Europe: When does reinventing the wheel make perfect sense? (February 2021)
- Power2People (November 2021)
- Power sector accelerating e-mobility: can utilities turn EVs into a grid asset? (February 2022)
- Power Plant (June 2022)
- The coming storm: Building electricity resilience to extreme weather (December 2022)
- The six essentials for e-mobility (March 2023)
- Electricity Market Design fit for Net Zero (March 2023)
- Decarbonisation Speedways (June 2023)
- System resilience and preparedness (February 2026)

Since 2019, Eurelectric has published the Power Barometer an annual report that compiles industry data on the sector’s progress toward carbon neutrality.

== Membership ==
Eurelectric currently has over 34 full members, representing the electricity industry in 32 European countries and speaking for more than 3,500 companies in power generation, distribution and supply.

Eurelectric also cooperates with over 40 corporations outside of traditional utilities that have an interest in electrification. Collaboration involves exchanging market experiences, exploring challenges and solutions, and sharing business intelligence. Such activity is carried out through one of Eurelectric’s four business platforms.

- Digitopia Platform – An AI and digitalisation workstream focused on unlocking AI and digital technology’s potential in the power sector.
- European 24/7 Hub – The task-force aims to accelerate power-system decarbonisation by moving towards 24/7 matching in corporate renewable electricity sourcing and market integration. It was launched in partnership with RE-Source platform.
- EVision Business Hub – Connects automakers, charging-point operators, fleet owners, utilities, and technology providers to discuss how to accelerate the uptake of e-mobility across Europe.
- Power to Buildings Business Hub – brings together European power utilities, manufacturers of heating and cooling technologies, flexibility providers, automation and connection solution providers, workforce representatives such as installers and relevant policy associations to enable smart and sustainable buildings across Europe.

Country	National Association
Austria	Oesterreichs Energie
Belgium	Febeg
Bulgaria	EMI
Croatia	Croatian Chamber of Economy
Cyprus	Electricity Authority of Cyprus
Czechia	CSZE
Denmark	Green Power Denmark
Estonia	Estonian Electricity Industries
Finland	Finnish Energy
France	Union Française de l’Electricité
Germany	BDEW
Greece	ESPIE
Hungary	Eurelectric Magyarorszagi Tagozat (EMT)
Iceland	Samorka
Ireland	Electricity Association of Ireland (EAI)
Italy	Elettricita Futura
Latvia	LEEA
Lithuania	NLEA
Luxembourg	OEEL
Malta	Enemalta
Netherlands	Energie Nederland
Netherlands	Netbeheer Nederland
Norway	Energi Norg
Poland	Polish Electricity Association (PKEE)
Portugal	Elecpor
Romania	IRE
Slovakia	ZZES
Slovenia	EZS
Spain	aeléc
Sweden	Energi Foretagen
Switzerland	VSE/AES
Türkiye	TESAB
United Kingdom	ENA (Energy Networks Association)
United Kingdom	Energy UK
