= Teollisuuden Voima =

Finnish nuclear power company

- Type: Public limited company
- Industry: Nuclear power
- Founded: 1969; 57 years ago
- Founder: 16 Finnish industrial and power companies
- Headquarters: Eurajoki, Finland
- Key people: Philippe Bordarier (President and CEO); Ilkka Tykkyläinen (Chairman)
- Revenue: ▲€897 million (2024)
- Owner: Pohjolan Voima (58.5%), Mankala (8.3%), Kemira (0.9%), Fortum Power and Heat (25.8%), EPV Energia (6.6%)
- Number of employees: 1082 (end of 2024)
- Website: www.tvo.fi

Teollisuuden Voima Oyj (TVO; Swedish: Industrins Kraft Abp, "Industrial Power Corporation") is a Finnish nuclear power company owned by a consortium of power and industrial companies. The biggest shareholders are Pohjolan Voima and Fortum.

TVO operates on a cost-price principle. It sells electricity to its shareholders at the price of the incurred costs. Thus, the profit of the company is normally zero. In 2024, TVO produced about 28% of the electricity produced in Finland.

== Olkiluoto ==
The company operates Olkiluoto Nuclear Power Plant, which consists of two BWRs (boiling water reactors), an EPR (European Pressurized Reactor) which reached full operational capacity in 2023, and formerly one half of a coal-fired power plant along with a wind farm.

The third reactor at Olkiluoto was expected to be ready in May 2009, but significant delays pushed commercial availability to May 2023. TVO has filed compensation claim for delays, and Areva-Siemens have counter-claimed against TVO. Arbitrators at the International Chamber of Commerce are considering the claims.

On 21 April 2010, the Government of Finland decided to grant a permit for the construction of a fourth reactor at Olkiluoto. The decision was approved by the Parliament on 1 July 2010. In 2014 this permit expired, and was not renewed by the government.

In January 2015 TVO announced plans to save around $17.7 million per year through 'efficiency-related structural changes' which are expected to cause up to 110 job cuts. The CEO of TVO, Jarmo Tanhua, explained the reasons as:

The competitiveness of the electricity produced in Olkiluoto has declined during the recent years and the outlook of the future is uncertain. Electricity market price has dropped and there are no signs of improvement in the foreseeable future ... In addition, costs related to nuclear power production have increased and the delay of Olkiluoto 3 project has caused remarkable additional costs.

An October 2016 story in the Süddeutsche Zeitung reported that TVO called on Siemens to take financial responsibility for the completion of unit 3 of the Olkiluoto Nuclear Power Plant, because its project partner, the French Areva Group, was restructured by the French government.

== See also ==
- Nuclear power in Finland
