= Voimaosakeyhtiö SF =

Finnish energy consortium company associated with Fennovoima

- Native name: Voimaosakeyhtiö SF
- Company type: Osakeyhtiö (private company)
- Industry: Energy
- Founded: 2006
- Headquarters: Helsinki, Finland
- Key people: Akke Kuusela (CEO); Timo Honkanen (Chair)
- Products: Electricity procurement for shareholders (Mankala structure)
- Website: www.voimaosakeyhtio.fi

Voimaosakeyhtiö SF is a Finnish company and a main shareholder of nuclear power company Fennovoima. Established in year 2006, the company holds 66 per cent of Fennovoima's shares. It is owned by companies which operate in energy production and industry, most of which are state-owned enterprises. The company is organized on the so-called "Mankala principle", commonly used in the energy industry in Finland, where the company's shareholders are bound to buy its product at cost and to answer for its finances without limit to their liability.

== Organization ==
=== Management ===
Voimaosakeyhtiö SF's CEO is Matti Suurnäkki and chairman of the board is Timo Honkanen. Vice chairman is Henri Hätönen and members of the board are Marko Haapala, Risto Kantola, Jarmo Kurikka, Mikael Lemström, Tony Lindström, Andreas Rasmus and Jukka Toivonen.

=== Shareholders ===
On year 2016 the shareholders were:

- Fortum Oyj
- Hanhikiven Sähkönmyynti Oy
- Huoltovoima Oy
- Kaakon Energia Oy
- Katternö Kärnkraft Oy Ab
- Kestra Kiinteistöpalvelut Oy
- Lahti Energia Oy
- Majakka Voima Oy
- Outokumpu Oyj
- Pohjois-Suomen Voima Oy
- Rauman Energia Oy
- Rautaruukki Oyj: (SSAB's Finnish subsidiary)
- SF Kaukolämpövoima Oy
- SRV Yhtiöt
- Suomen Voima Oy
- Oy Turku Energia Ab
- Vantaan Energia Oy
- Voimajunkkarit Oy
- Yrittäjän Voima Oy
