= Fennovoima =

Finnish nuclear power company

Fennovoima Ltd
- Native name: Fennovoima Oy
- Type: Private limited company
- Industry: nuclear power
- Founded: 2007
- Headquarters: Helsinki, Finland
- Key people: Matti Suurnäkki (CEO)
- Owner: Voimaosakeyhtiö SF (66 %) and RAOS Voima Oy (34 %)
- Website: fennovoima.fi

Fennovoima Ltd (Finnish: Fennovoima Oy) is a nuclear power company established by Russian state's nuclear company Rosatom and a consortium of Finnish state-owned power and industrial companies.

The company does not own any nuclear capacities; however, it was preparing to build the 1200 MW Hanhikivi 1 nuclear power plant at Pyhäjoki. Fennovoima terminated the project in May 2022, citing significant delays and Rosatom's "inability to deliver the project". After the termination of the project, Fennovoima laid off almost all of its employees and intiated arbitrations against Rosatom to claim compensation for damages.

== Shareholders ==
Finnish industry, trade and the energy companies in need of their own electricity production started the company in 2007. Originally Fennovoima was created as a partnership between Voimaosakeyhtiö SF, a cooperative producing electricity for its owners' needs at production cost in proportion to their ownership share (Mankala), with 66% and the German power company E.ON with 34%. After E.ON's withdrawal from Finland, Voimaosakeyhtiö SF briefly owned 100% of Fennovoima shares. According to the agreement with Russian Rosatom, RAOS Voima Oy, a Finnish subsidiary of Rosatom, acquired a 34% stake which previously belonged to E.ON. Although RAOS Voima was prepared to take 49% in the project, Voimaosakeyhtiö SF committed to own more than half of the power plant and aimed to increase the share of Finnish companies up to 66%. As of 2014, Voimaosakeyhtiö SF has 44 shareholders.

== Power plant project ==
On 21 April 2010, the Government of Finland decided to grant a permit (Decision-in-Principle) to Fennovoima for construction of a nuclear reactor. The decision was approved by the Parliament on 1 July 2010. The estimated construction time is six years until 2024.

The chosen plant model was Rosatom's pressurized water reactor AES-2006 which is the latest evolution of VVER plant designs. The other bidders for the project were Areva and Toshiba.

Fennovoima began direct negotiations with Rosatom in April 2013. On 21 December 2013, Fennovoima and Rosatom Overseas, a subsidiary of Rosatom, signed a plant supply contract. The plant was planned to be commissioned by 2024.

On 28 February 2014 Voimaosakeyhtiö SF made the final decision to participate in Fennovoima's nuclear power plant construction. The final investment decision was to be made in 2014.

Fennovoima submitted an application at the end of June 2015 including the stakeholder with a 35 percent share of the Russian firm Rosatom and a percent share of Croatian power company Migrit Energija. In August 2015, the public was informed that Migrit Solarna Energija would not be involved in the venture after it was reviewed to be owned by Sberbank Russia.

Fennovoima terminated the project in May 2022 due to significant delays and Rosatom's "inability to deliver the project". The company added that the Russian invasion of Ukraine further increased the risks of the project.

== Criticism and finances ==
In July 2015 less than a third of Finns supported a Fennovoima nuclear plant.

The company's financial plans assume the plant will be able to sell electricity at no more than 50 €/MWh across its lifetime, while the International Energy Agency estimates LCOE of 150 $/MWh for nuclear in the EU in 2020 (115 $/MWh in 2050), twice as expensive as offshore wind (75 $/MWh).

== See also ==
- Energy in Finland
- Nuclear power in Finland
