= Ernesti Rikhard Rainesalo =

Finnish politician

Ernesti Rikhard Rainesalo (8 April 1864 – 16 August 1929) was a Finnish politician and a member of the Senate of Finland. He was a member of the Finnish Party.

He was born in Eurajoki, Grand Duchy of Finland, as Ernesti Rikhard Rothström, which he was known as until 1906 when his surname was changed to Rainesalo, to vicar Karl Fredrik Rothström and his wife Augusta Sofia Rancken. Rainesalo finished his secondary education in 1884 and went on to study law, graduating from the University of Helsinki with his M.A. in law in 1890. At the same time, he also served as a vänrikki in the Finnish army, in the Uusikaupunki reserve forces, the Uusimaa Sniper Battalion and the Kärsämäki reserve forces until 1889.

After graduation, he went to work for the Grand Duchy, where he served in the government of Turku and Pori Province and in the economic division of the Senate. In 1905, he briefly served as the acting governor of Oulu Province. On 14 February 1910 Rainesalo was named senator. As a senator, he served as the head of the Civil Ministry from 1912 to 1913 during the Markov government and as the head of the House Ministry from 1913 during the Borovitinov government until the October Revolution of 1917. Rainesalo was awarded the rank of Actual State Councillor in 1916 in recognition for his service to the Russian Empire and the emperor.

After Finland gained her independence, Rainesalo worked as a lawyer in Helsinki until his death in 1929 in Helsinki.

== Bibliography ==
- Håkon Holmberg: (Keisarillisen) Suomen senaatin talousosaston puheenjohtajat, jäsenet ja virkamiehet 1909–1918 – elämäkerrallinen luettelo, Helsinki, 1964 (in Finnish).
- Kansallisbiografia (in Finnish).
