= Eurajoki =

Eurajoki Euraåminne
- Municipality
- Eurajoen kunta Euraåminne kommun
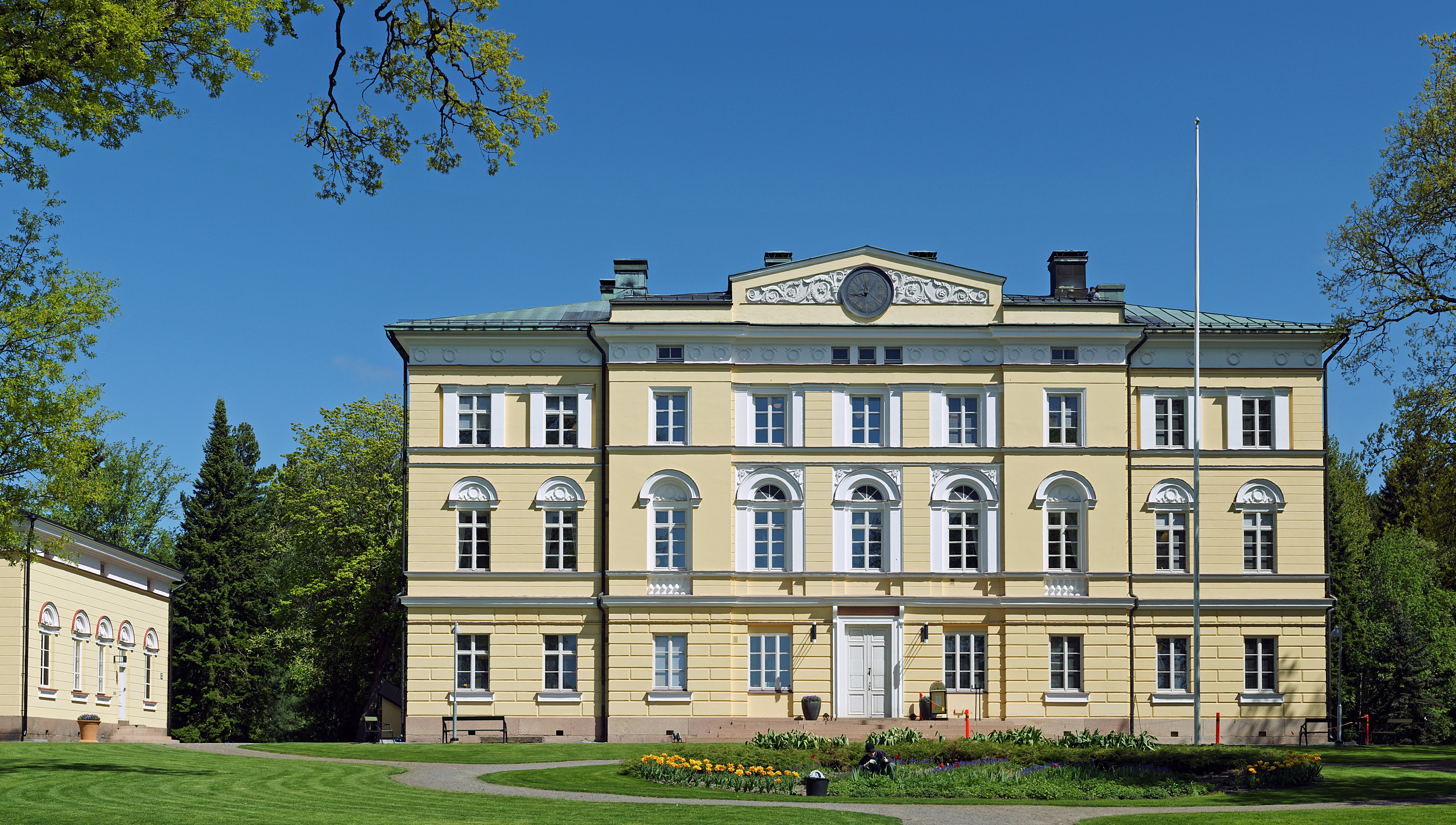
- Vuojoki Manor at Eurajoki, designed by Carl Ludvig Engel

- Coat of arms

- Location of Eurajoki in Finland
- Interactive map of Eurajoki
- Coordinates: 61°12′N 021°44′E
- Country: Finland
- Region: Satakunta
- Sub-region: Rauma
- First records: 1344
- Charter: 1869

Government
  - Municipality manager: Harri Hiitiö

Area (2018-01-01)
  - Total: 1,504.96 km^{2} (581.07 sq mi)
  - Land: 514.99 km^{2} (198.84 sq mi)
  - Water: 298.39 km^{2} (115.21 sq mi)
  - Rank: 223rd largest in Finland

Population (2025-12-31)
  - Total: 8,920
  - Rank: 107th largest in Finland
  - Density: 17.32/km^{2} (44.9/sq mi)

Population by native language
  - Finnish: 96.2% (official)
  - Swedish: 0.4%
  - Others: 3.5%

Population by age
  - 0 to 14: 17.1%
  - 15 to 64: 56.7%
  - 65 or older: 26.2%
- Time zone: UTC+02:00 (EET)
  - Summer (DST): UTC+03:00 (EEST)
- Climate: Dfc
- Website: www.eurajoki.fi

Eurajoki (Finnish: [ˈeu̯rɑˌjoki]; Swedish: Euraåminne) is a municipality of Finland located in the region of Satakunta in the province of Western Finland. The municipality has a population of 8,920 (31 December 2025) and covers an area of 1,504.96 square kilometres (581.07 sq mi) of which 298.39 km^{2} (115.21 sq mi) is water. The population density is 17.32 inhabitants per square kilometre (44.9/sq mi).

The municipality is unilingually Finnish.

== Administrative divisions ==
Eurajoki is administratively subdivided into villages, grouped into two sections; due to the former municipality of Luvia being annexed in 2017:

Eurajoki Proper

- Auvi, Hankkila, Huhta, Ilavainen, Irjanne, Kainu, Kaukomäki, Kaukonpieli, Kirkonkylä, Koivuniemi, Kuivalahti, Köykkä, Lapijoki, Lavila, Linnamaa, Lutta, Mullila, Pappila, Pihlaus, Rikantila, Saari, Sydänmaa, Tahkoniemi, Taipale, Tarvola, Vaimala, Vuojoki, Väkkärä

Luvia

- Hanninkylä, Korpi, Lemlahti, Luodonkylä, Löytty, Mikkola, Niemenkylä, Perä, Sassila, Sitlahti, Väipäre

== Economy ==
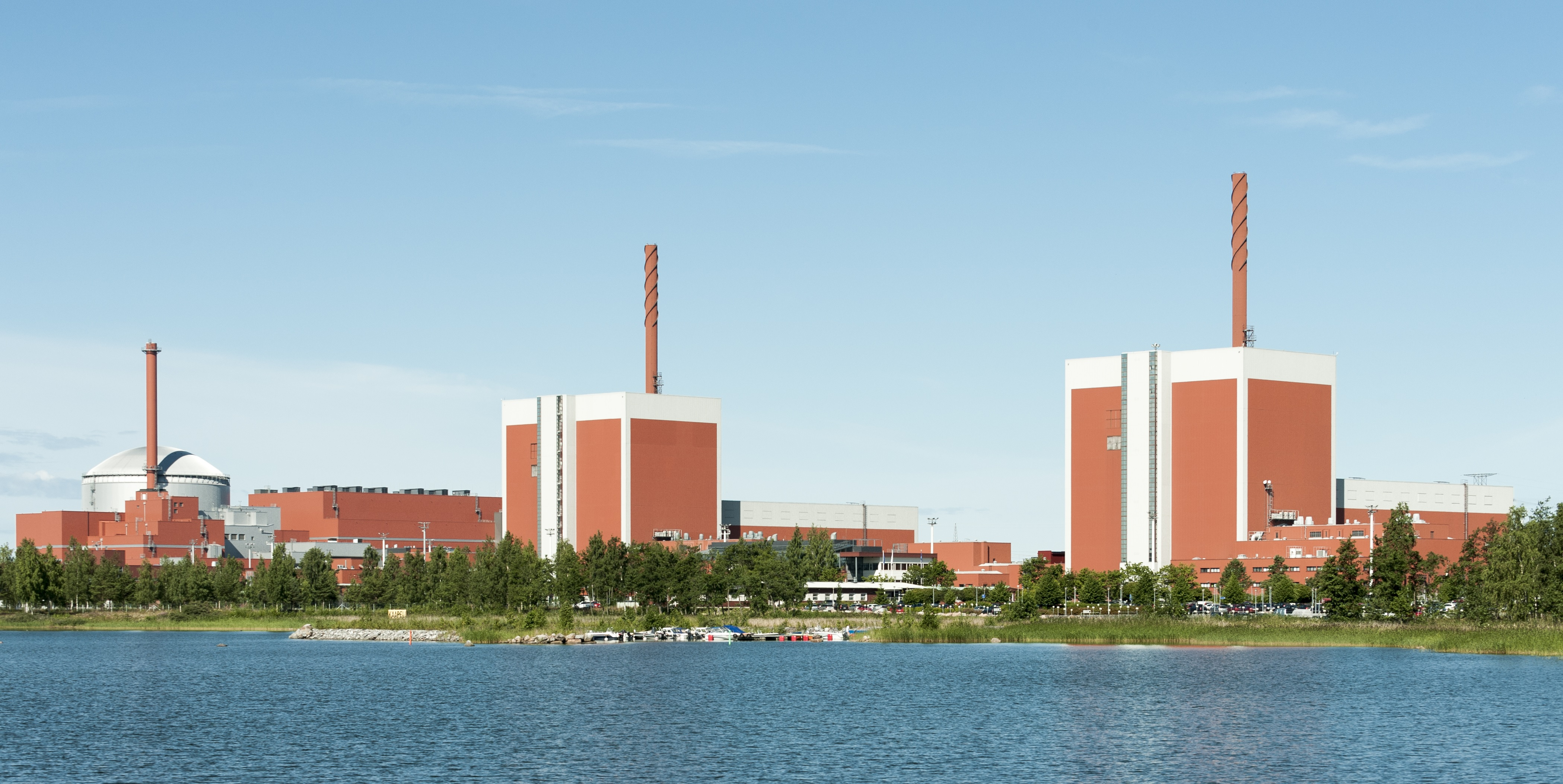
The Olkiluoto Nuclear Power Plant in Eurajoki

Three of Finland's five nuclear reactors are on the island of Olkiluoto in Eurajoki, and a fourth one is planned since 2008. The two other operating reactors are at the Loviisa Nuclear Power Plant.

The Onkalo spent nuclear fuel repository, a deep geological repository for spent nuclear fuel, is already constructed and is waiting (as of Q3 2026) for the government to give a permit for operation. The site will be a permanent facility for spent-fuel storage.

== Transport ==
The distance from the church village of Eurajoki to the nearest town, Rauma, is 15 kilometres (9.3 mi), and to the nearest city, Pori, is 35 kilometres (22 mi). Highway 8 (E8) and the railway between Kokemäki and Rauma run through the municipality.

== Politics ==
Results of the 2011 Finnish parliamentary election in Eurajoki:

- Centre Party 33.7%
- Social Democratic Party 26.4%
- True Finns 19.2%
- National Coalition Party 10.9%
- Left Alliance 5.2%
- Christian Democrats 2.8%
- Green League 1.3%

== Notable people ==
- Jere Laaksonen, ice hockey player
- Ernesti Rikhard Rainesalo, senator
- Olli-Pekka Heinonen

== See also ==
- Eura
- Liinmaa Castle
