= Finnish Energy =

Finnish energy industry trade association

Finnish Energy (ET, Finnish: Energiateollisuus ry., Swedish: Finsk Energiindustri) is the trade association for Finnish energy industry sector. It is a member organisation of the Confederation of Finnish Industries EK.

The association was founded in 2004, and as of 2020, has approximately 260 companies as members.
