= Radiation and Nuclear Safety Authority =

Radiation safety agency in Finland

- Säteilyturvakeskus; Strålsäkerhetscentralen

Agency overview
- Formed: 1958
- Preceding agency: Säteilyfysiikan Laitos (SFL)
- Jurisdiction: Republic of Finland
- Headquarters: Vantaa, Finland
- Employees: Approx 320
- Parent agency: Ministry of Social Affairs and Health
- Website: www.stuk.fi/web/en/

The Radiation and Nuclear Safety Authority (Finnish: Säteilyturvakeskus, Swedish: Strålsäkerhetscentralen), often abbreviated as STUK, is a government agency tasked with nuclear safety and radiation monitoring in Finland. The agency is a division of the Ministry of Social Affairs and Health; when founded in 1958 STUK was first charged with inspection of radiation equipment used in hospitals.

The agency is also a scientific research and education organization, researching the nature, effects and damaging effects of radiation. The agency currently employs about 320 people, and is led by Petteri Tiippana.

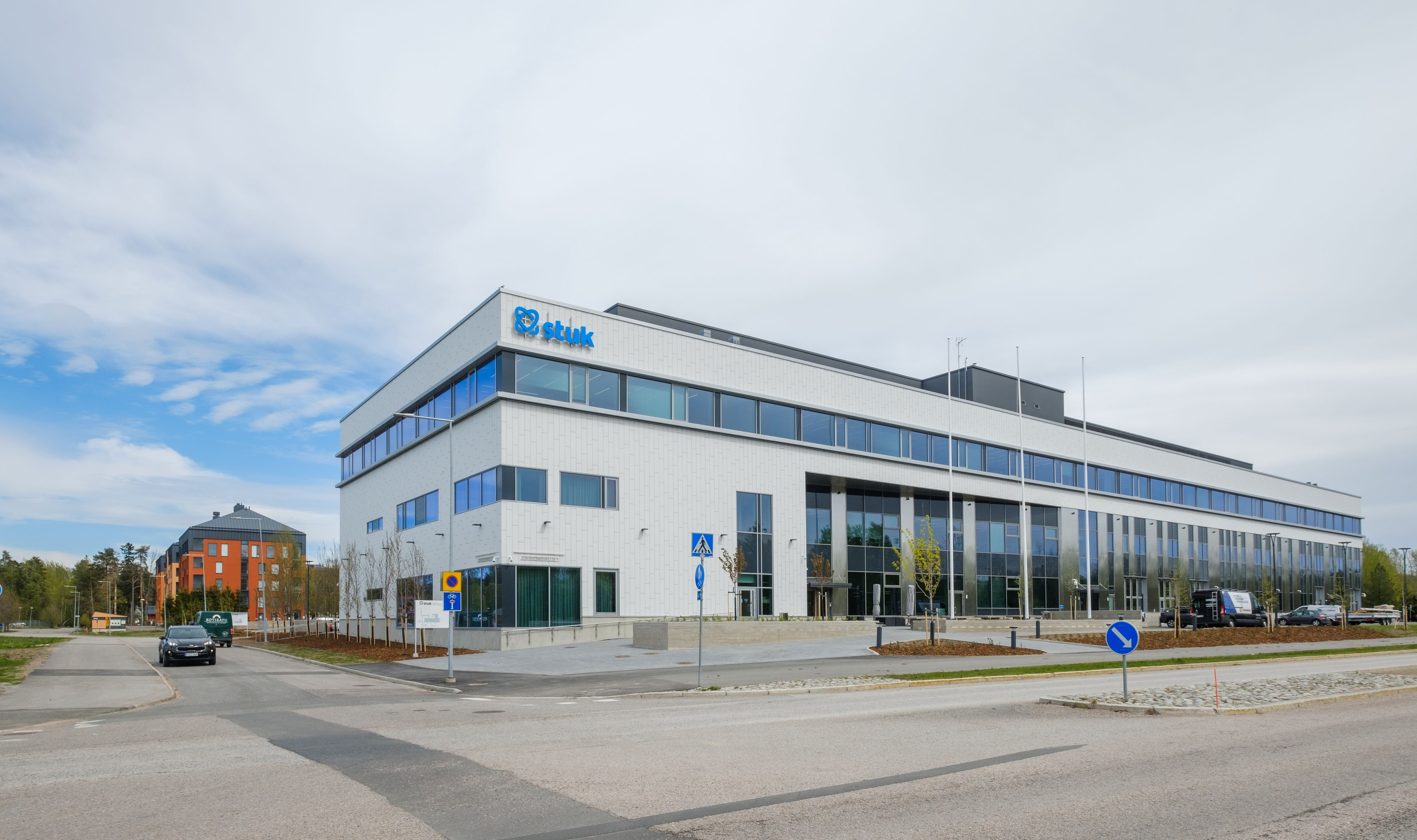
STUK's headquarters in Jokiniemi, Vantaa

The agency works in collaboration with EU and other nearby countries, as part of the European Nuclear Safety Regulators Group (ENSREG), and with the UN organization International Atomic Energy Agency (IAEA) along with the International Commission on Radiological Protection (ICRP).

== Director generals ==
The director general of Nuclear Safety Authority was Jukka Laaksonen during 1997–2012, Tero Varjoranta in 2013, and is now Petteri Tiippana.

Tero Varjoranta was named as the deputy director general United Nations nuclear inspectorate the IAEA in 2013.

The director general of Nuclear Safety Authority, Jukka Laaksonen, became Rosatom Overseas Vice President immediately after retiring. This was criticised but according to media reporting there was no legislation to prevent it. In February 2013 he gave statements for the Fennovoima potential nuclear plant in Pyhäjoki. Fennovoima nuclear plant project is disputed. Heidi Hautala demanded in February 2013 new application for the Parliament since E.ON cancelled its participation with 34% ownership.

== See also ==
- Nuclear power in Finland
