= Loviisa Nuclear Power Plant =

Nuclear power plant in Loviisa, Finland

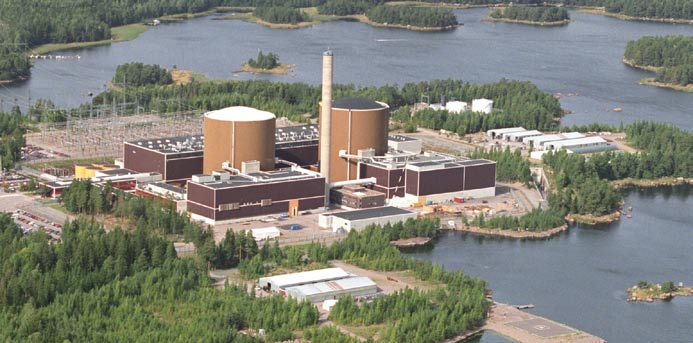
- Loviisa Nuclear Power Plant from the air
- Official name: Loviisan ydinvoimalaitos
- Country: Finland
- Location: Loviisa, County of Uusimaa
- Coordinates: 60°22′20″N 26°20′50″E
- Status: Operational
- Construction began: LO1: 1 May 1971; LO2: 1 August 1972
- Commission date: LO1: 9 May 1977; LO2: 5 January 1981
- Owner: Fortum Power and Heat Oy
- Operator: Fortum
- Employees: 530 (2021)

Nuclear power station
- Reactors: 2
- Reactor type: VVER
- Reactor supplier: Atomenergoexport
- Cooling source: Gulf of Finland
- Thermal capacity: 2 × 1,500 MW_{th} Combined: 3,000 MW_{th}

Power generation
- Units operational: 2 × 507 MW_{e} (net)
- Make and model: OKB Gidropress VVER-440/V-213
- Nameplate capacity: 1,014 MW
- Capacity factor: 92.9% (2021)
- Annual net output: 8,200 GW·h (2021)

External links
- Website: Loviisa nuclear power plant
- Commons: Related media on Commons

The Loviisa Nuclear Power Plant (NPP) (Finnish: Loviisan ydinvoimalaitos, Swedish: Lovisa kärnkraftverk) is located close to the Finnish town of Loviisa. It houses two Soviet-designed VVER-440 pressurised water reactors, with capacities of 507 MW each. It is one of Finland's two operating nuclear power plants, the other being the three-unit Olkiluoto Nuclear Power Plant.

== History ==
The unit 1 and 2 reactors at Loviisa NPP went into commercial operation in 1977 and 1981, respectively. To comply with Finnish nuclear regulation, Westinghouse and Siemens supplied equipment and engineering expertise. This unorthodox mix of Western and Soviet enterprise led to the project developers being given the nickname "Eastinghouse". The plant is operated by Fortum Oyj.

In 1996, the pressure vessel of Unit 1 was successfully heat annealed in order to clear embrittlement caused by neutron bombardment and impurities of the welding seam between the two halves of the vessel.

The operating licence for both units has been renewed for a 50-year lifetime, Loviisa-1 to 2027 and Loviisa-2 to 2030. As of 2018, Fortum is reportedly considering applying for a further 20-year lifetime extension until 2050, which is a change from plans just a year earlier that would have seen the plant decommissioned on the earlier schedule.

Fortum Power and Heat Oy applied to build a third reactor unit, to produce up to 1,000 MW_{th} of district heating supply and from 800-1,600 MW of electrical generation, which the Finnish government declined on 21 April 2010.

Spent fuel from the reactors was planned to be stored permanently at the Onkalo spent nuclear fuel repository operated by Posiva.

In 2014 Rolls-Royce took over the modernisation of safety-related systems for both units from an AREVA-Siemens consortium and the project was completed in 2018. Since then, both Unit 1 and Unit 2 are operating at a nominal 507 MW capacity after updates.

In 2022, Fortum submitted a plan for the reactors' life extension to 2050. Russia's TVEL will continue to supply fuel until the contracts for unit 1 and 2 come up for renewal in 2027 and 2030, respectively. The extension was approved by the Finnish government in 2023. In 2024, Fortum announced that they had successfully switched to fuel provided by Westinghouse Electric, a US company. As part of the modernization works, turbine side upgrades will result in an extra 38 MW combined. In 2026, Fortum said 80 % of the capital expenditure needed for the extension was pending investment decisions, as it signed a 22-year power purchase agreement with Google for 50 % of the plant's output.

The first batch of Westinghouse fuel was loaded to Loviisa 2 reactor in 2024, guaranteeing a Western alternative to the Russian fuel.

== See also ==
- Energy in Finland
- Nuclear power in Finland
