= Guðmundur =

Guðmundur (Icelandic pronunciation: [ˈkvʏðmʏntʏr̥]), sometimes rendered as Gudmundur, is an Icelandic male first name, sometimes shortened to Gummi or Gvendur.

The Icelandic surname Guðmundsson is a patronymic surname meaning son of Guðmundur. Guðmundsdóttir is a patronymic surname meaning daughter of Guðmundur.

Guðmundur may refer to:

- Guðmundur Arason (1161–1237), 12th and 13th century Icelandic saintly bishop
- Gudmundur S. (Bo) Bodvarsson (1952–2006), director of the Earth Sciences Division at the Lawrence Berkeley National Laboratory
- Guðmundur Finnbogason (1873–1944), Icelandic philosopher
- Gudmundur Fjelsted (died 1961), politician in Manitoba, Canada
- Guðmundur Guðmundsson (handball) (born 1960), the coach of the Iceland national handball team
- Guðmundur Gunnarsson (born 1945), Icelandic labour leader and father of Icelandic singer Björk
- Guðmundur Reynir Gunnarsson (born 1989), Icelandic footballer
- Guðmundur Steinn Gunnarsson (born 1982), Icelandic musician and composer
- Guðmundur G. Hagalín (1898–1985), Icelandic writer
- Guðmundur Jónsson (born 1953), Icelandic architect who lives in Norway
- Guðmundur Kamban (1888–1945), Icelandic playwright and novelist
- Guðmundur Þór Kárason (born 1974), founder of Wit Puppets
- Guðmundur Kjærnested (1923–2005), commander in the Icelandic Coast Guard who took part in all three Anglo-Icelandic Cod Wars
- Guðmundur Ingi Kristinsson (born 1955), Icelandic politician
- Guðmundur Oddur Magnússon, Icelandic artist
- Guðmundur frá Miðdal (1895–1963), Icelandic artist
- Guðmundur Sigurjónsson (born 1947), Icelandic chess Grandmaster
- Guðmundur Ari Sigurjónsson (born 1988), Icelandic politician
- Guðmundur Steinarsson (born 1979), Icelandic international footballer
- Gudmundur Thorvaldsson, Icelandic actor
- Guðmundur Andri Thorsson (born 1957), Icelandic editor, critic, and author
- Guðmundur Torfason (born 1961), retired Icelandic footballer
