= Guðmundsson =

Guðmundsson is an Icelandic patronym, meaning son of Guðmundur. The name may refer to:

- Ágúst Guðmundsson (born 1947), Icelandic film director
- Albert Guðmundsson (disambiguation)
- Ari Guðmundsson (1927–2003), Icelandic Olympic ski jumper
- Ari Trausti Guðmundsson (born 1948), Icelandic politician
- Arinbjörn Guðmundsson (1932–2014), Icelandic chess master
- Birkir Ívar Guðmundsson (contemporary), Icelandic professional handball player
- Björgólfur Guðmundsson (1941–2025), Icelandic billionaire businessman
- Björn Hjörtur Guðmundsson (1911–1998), Icelandic master carpenter and environmental pioneer
- Böðvar Guðmundsson (born 1939), Icelandic author, playwright, and poet
- Eggert Guðmundsson (born 1964), Icelandic footballer
- Eggert Aron Guðmundsson (born 2004), Icelandic footballer
- Einar Már Guðmundsson (born 1954), Icelandic author and poet
- Guðmundur Guðmundsson (chess player) (1918–1974), Icelandic chess player
- Guðmundur Guðmundsson (handballer) (born 1960), Icelandic professional handball coach
- Guðmundur Guðmundsson (Mormon) (1825–1883), Icelandic Mormon missionary
- Guðmundur Ívarsson Guðmundsson (1909–1987), Icelandic politician and minister
- Haraldur Freyr Guðmundsson (born 1981), Icelandic professional football player
- Herbert Guðmundsson (born 1953), Icelandic pop singer
- Jóhann Berg Guðmundsson (born 1990), Icelandic professional football player
- Jóhann Birnir Guðmundsson (born 1977), Icelandic professional football player
- Jón Guðmundsson (1904–1988) was an Icelandic chess player.
- Jón Axel Guðmundsson (born 1996), Icelandic basketball player.
- Jón lærði Guðmundsson (1574–1658) was an Icelandic autodidact, poet, and alleged sorcerer.
- Kristján Guðmundsson (born 1941), contemporary Icelandic conceptual artist
- Kristmann Guðmundsson (1901–1983), Icelandic novelist of romantic fiction
- Magnús Guðmundsson (1879–1937), Icelandic politician; member of the Althing 1916–1937
- Páll Guðmundsson (born 1959), Icelandic sculptor and artist
- Pétur Guðmundsson (basketball) (born 1958), Icelandic professional basketball player
- Pétur Guðmundsson (athlete) (born 1962), Icelandic shot putter
- Sigmar Guðmundsson (born 1969), Icelandic politician
- Tómas Guðmundsson (1901–1983), Icelandic author and poet; known as “Reykjavík’s poet”
- Tryggvi Guðmundsson (born 1974), Icelandic professional football player

== See also ==
- Guðmundsdóttir
