= Guðmundsdóttir =

Guðmundsdóttir is a surname of Icelandic origin, meaning daughter of Guðmundur. In Icelandic names, the name is not strictly a surname, but a patronymic. The name may refer to:

- Björk Guðmundsdóttir (born 1965), full name of Icelandic art-pop musician Björk
- Fríða Dís Guðmundsdóttir (born 1987), Icelandic musician and blues singer
- Rannveig Guðmundsdóttir (born 1940), Icelandic politician, government minister, member of the Althing (1989–2007)
- Rósa Guðmundsdóttir (1795–1855), Icelandic poet
- Svava Rós Guðmundsdóttir (born 1995), Icelandic football player

== See also ==
- Guðmundsson
