= Myriam Bat-Yosef =

Israeli-Icelandic painter (1931–2023)

Myriam Bat-Yosef (Hebrew: מרים בת-יוסף; née Marion Hellerman, also known as María Jósefsdóttir; January 31, 1931 – October 8, 2023) was an Israeli-Icelandic artist.

== Early life and education ==
Born in Berlin, Bat-Yosef relocated to Jaffa, Palestine, in 1934 with her parents, Yosef, a Haganah member, and Godda Promnick, a beautician. She moved to Paris with her mother following her father's death in 1936. In 1942, she changed her name to Myriam Bat-Yosef, reflecting her Israeli heritage. The outbreak of World War II led to their return to Tel Aviv.

Bat-Yosef was educated at the Avni Institute of Art and Design in Tel Aviv and later at the École des Beaux-Arts in Paris. She married the Icelandic artist Erró, which introduced her to Icelandic landscapes and further influenced her artistic style. She exhibited in Iceland under the name María Jósefsdóttir.

== Career ==
Her professional career included exhibitions in various countries, notably a 1963 exhibition at the National Museum of Iceland in Reykjavík. Her marriage ended in 1964, after which she incorporated Hebrew themes into her artwork. A notable exhibition of her work took place at the Sydow Gallery in Frankfurt in 1964, marking a significant post-war event for Israeli art in Germany.

Her response to the Six-Day War in 1967 was showcased in a New York exhibition featuring painted sculptures and drawings. In the 1970s, Bat-Yosef's work continued to evolve, with significant installations like "Hell and Paradise" at the Israel Museum in Jerusalem in 1971.

Disillusioned with Israeli politics, Bat-Yosef resettled in Paris in 1980. Her work from this period, such as "Antiracism" (1980), is noted for its distinctive style and thematic content. Her final major exhibition was "Désir" in 2018 at the Maison Nationale des Artistes, Nogent-sur-Marne.
