= Communist Unity (Marxist–Leninist) =

Icelandic Maoist political party

Communist Unity Einingarsamtök kommúnista (marx-lenínistar)
- Chairperson: Ari Trausti Guðmundsson
- Founded: 1973
- Dissolved: 1979
- Merged into: Kommúnistasamtökin
- Newspaper: Verkalýðsblaðið
- Ideology: Marxism-leninism; Anti-revisionism; Maoism
- Political position: Far-left

Communist Unity (Marxist–Leninist) (Icelandic: Einingarsamtök kommúnista (marx-lenínistar) ) was a Maoist party formed in the late 1973 in Iceland, mainly by Icelandic students who had studied in Norway. The party's chairman was Ari Trausti Guðmundsson.

The party was ardently opposed what it deemed Soviet social imperialism as well as American imperialism, and opposed other Icelandic communist parties which it found to be revisionist. It held a staunchly pro-China line, until the Sino-Albanian split, when it sided with Albania.

From 1975 to 1985, Communist Unity published the newspaper Verkalýðsblaðið ('the working people's paper'). In 1979, the party was integrated into the Communist Union (Kommúnistasamtökin) together with the other Icelandic Maoist party, the Communist Party of Iceland (Marxist–Leninist) (Kommúnistaflokkur Íslands (m-l) ).

Amongst other parties, the party maintained fraternal relations with the Norwegian Workers' Communist Party, the Communist Party of Germany/Marxists–Leninists, the Marxist–Leninist League of Denmark, and the Communist Party of Sweden.
