= Ragnar Th. Sigurdsson =

Icelandic photographer

Ragnar Th. Sigurdsson, Icelandic: Ragnar Þ. Sigurðsson, (b. 1958) is a photographer specializing in landscapes portraying the natural beauty of Iceland, Greenland and the Arctic. In March 2010, he gained international recognition with his shots of the erupting volcano Eyjafjallajökull.

== Career ==
After completing his education in Iceland and Sweden, Sigurdsson embarked on a career as a news photographer in 1975. Since 1985, he has operated from his own studio with work for travel publications, business reports and advertising agencies in addition to illustrations for the Icelandic authorities and regions. His work on nature and travel has covered geological formations, volcanoes, waterfalls and glaciers as well as flora and fauna. In addition to his native Iceland, he has photographed the Faroe Islands, Greenland, Northern Canada and even the North Pole which he reached in 1995.

In March 2010, after Iceland's volcano Eyjafjallajökull started to erupt, Sigurdsson took some 10,000 shots of the event. Some of the most impressive images were obtained when he flew over the epicenter capturing all the force of the deadly phenomenon. With the assistance of geologist Ari Trausti Guðmundsson, he selected a subset for a book, "Eyjafjallajokull: Untamed Nature", documenting the eruption. The first two editions sold out fast leading to a third, updated edition: "Eyjafjallajokull: Grandeur of Nature".

== Bibliography ==
- Ari Trausti Guðmundsson, Ragnar Th. Sigurðsson, "Eyjafjallajökull - Untamed Nature", 2010, 112 pp.
- Ari Trausti Guðmundsson, Ragnar Th. Sigurðsson, "Íslenskur jarðfrædilykill", Mál og menning, 2002, 243 pp. ISBN 9979-3-2297-7
- Ari Trausti Guðmundsson, Ragnar Th. Sigurðsson, translated by Mike Handley, "North light", Iceland Review, 2002, 92 pp. ISBN 9979-51-189-3
- Ari Trausti Guðmundsson, Helgi Gudmundsson, Ragnar Th. Sigurðsson, "Vatnajškull: Ice on Fire", Arctic Books, 1996, ISBN 9979-9275-1-8.
- Ragnar Th. Sigurðsson, "Iceland", Ljósmyndir Íslendingar, 2007, 45 pp.
