= Ari Trausti Guðmundsson =

Icelandic politician (born 1948)

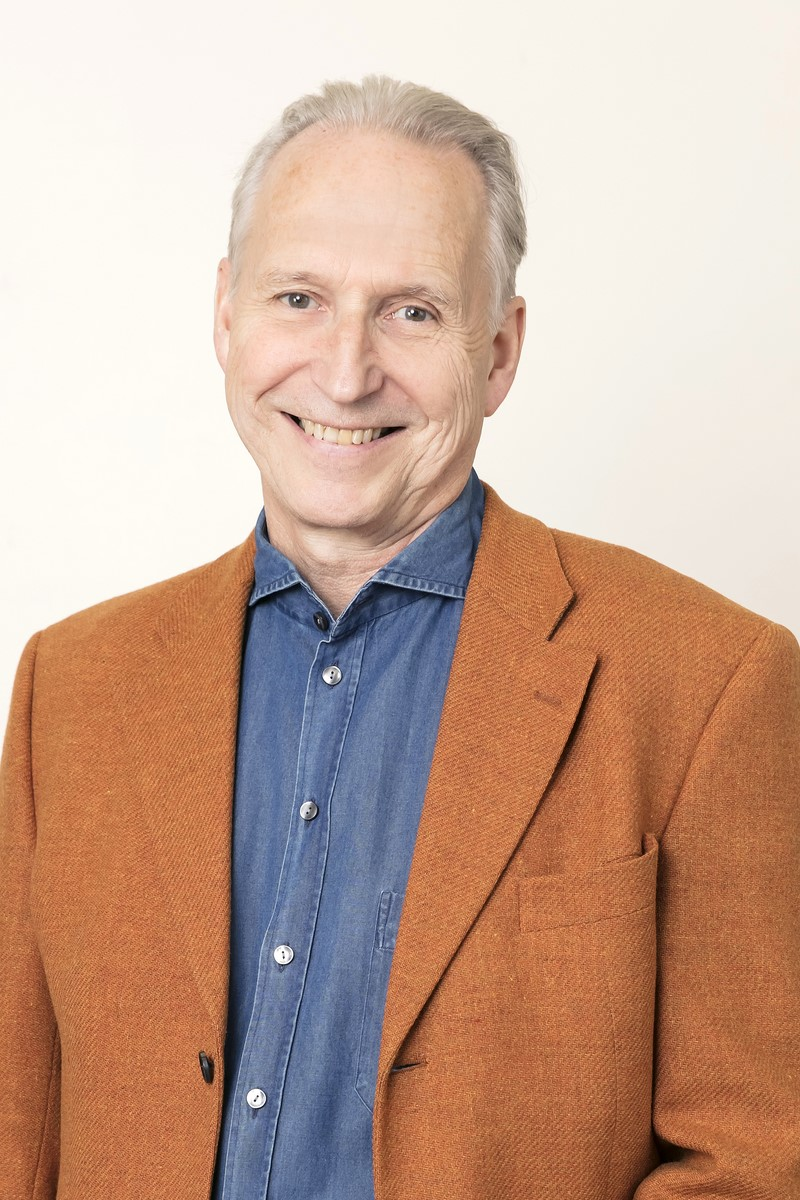
- Born: 3 December 1948 (age 77); Reykjavík, Iceland
- Education: University of Oslo; University of Iceland
- Occupations: Geologist, author, journalist, writer, politician
- Known for: Documentaries, explorations, international expertise on the Eyjafjallajökull and Icelandic glaciers
- Notable work: Books: Vegalínur, Primordial Landscapes, Íslenskar Eldstöðvar; Exhibitions: LAVA
- Political party: Left-Green Movement, previously chairman of Communist Unity (Marxist–Leninist)
- Spouse: María G. Baldvinsdóttir
- Parent(s): Lydia Zeitner-Sternberg Pálsdóttir and Guðmundur frá Miðdal
- Awards: -Prize from the Danish-Icelandic Fund 1970 -Aurelio Pecei Environmental Prize, Italy 1998 -Pálsvarða – Recognition from the Touring Club of Iceland, 1998 -Nomination for the Nordic Environmental Price, 1998 -The Honorary Literary Prize for non-fiction - The Library Fund, 1999 -Nomination for the Literary Prize of Iceland, 2001 -The Halldor Laxnes Literary Prize, 2002 -The Rannis Prize for Public Information on Science, 2007 -The Icelandic Ethical Humanist Association Prize for communication in science, 2010 -The Soil Conservation Prize, 2015

Ari Trausti Guðmundsson (born 3 December 1948) is an Icelandic geologist, author, documentarian, broadcaster, journalist, lecturer, mountaineer and explorer. He worked as teacher, consultant and lecturer on: earth science, environmental and tourism issues. He served as a mountain guide, TV- weather reporter, media presenter and producer and has planned nature and science exhibitions in Iceland, Paris and London and authored non-fiction books, fiction and poetry. He was a presidential candidate in 2012. He was elected as a member of Icelandic Parliament in 2016 and served until 2021.

== Education ==
Ari Trausti graduated from grammar school in 1968 and finished a course in philosophy and psychology from the University of Iceland in 1972. He attended the University of Oslo from 1968 onwards, and completed a Cand.mag. degree in geophysics and geology in 1973 and as well as advanced studies in geology at the University of Iceland 1983–1984. His various tasks since have been focused on research, journalism, teaching, mountaineering and tourism until 1987. After that he has been working as a freelancer, predominantly occupied with being a consultant and lecturer plus promoting science, nature conservation and innovation in the media, including radio and television. Simultaneously he has written dozens of books and produced, chiefly in cooperation with the film company Lífsmynd, a long array of television programs and documentaries.

== Author ==
Ari Trausti has written numerous books on Icelandic nature, geology, volcanology, astronomy, environmental protection, travel, hiking and mountaineering. All in all, a total of over 50 titles have been published in Icelandic, English, German, Italian and French by various publishers. He also has written the storyboards and scripts for the many TV-programs and documentaries, produced by five different companies, most commonly in cooperation with cinematographer Valdimar Leifsson (Lífsmynd).

Besides non-fiction, Ari Trausti has published short stories, collections of poetry and novels, a total of 12 works of fiction. He published his first collection of short stories in 2002, named Vegalínur (Road lines), for which he received the Halldór Laxness Literary Prize in 2002. He has received several other awards, including The Honorary Literary Prize for non-fiction from The Library Fund in 1999 and was nominated for the Icelandic Literature Prize in 2001 for his elaborate book on the volcanic history of Iceland (Íslenskar eldstöðvar) and received The Rannís Prize for Public Dissemination in Science in 2007. He has also written many articles for newspapers and magazines on the environment, nature, culture, tourism and mountaineering. In 2022 he reveived the Icelandic Knight´s Cross of The Order of the Falcon.

== Politics ==
Ari Trausti was involved in left wing politics as chairman of the Maoist league Communist Unity (Marxist–Leninist) 1973-79 and the merger of the two Icelandic Maoist organizations 1979–83; but then became independent of political parties. He was a candidate for the 2012 presidential elections. Late 2016, he became a member of the Icelandic parliament, Althingi, for the Left-Green Movement in the South Constituency (the region from Reykjanes to Höfn). He ended his tem in September 2021 by not running as a candidate in the autumn elections. Ari Trausti has acted as vice-chair in the Committee for Environment, Transport and Municipalities, as a permanent member of the Committee for Foreign Affairs, chair of the CPAR-committee (Conference of Parliamentarians for the Arctic Regions) and chair of the committee for the Þingvellir National Park. He was the vice-chair of a committee of parliamentarians that revised the Arctic Policy of Iceland in 2021.

== Mountaineering and explorations ==
Ari Trausti is an international member of the US-based international multidisciplinary professional society The Explorers Club. He has traveled widely for decades and summited many mountains domestically (including first ascents) and abroad. He participated in or led expeditions to various remote destinations in the Arctic, Europe, Asia and South-America as well as domestically. In 2014 he toured the Antarctic Peninsula. He was nominated for the Nordic Environmental Price in 1998, received The Icelandic Ethical Humanist Association Prize for communication in science in 2010 and The Soil Conservation Prize in 2015. He has lectured in Greenland, Canada, Germany, Gr. Britain, and United States. He is a member of the committee for the Leif Erikson Award. He participated in radio and TV-programs on nature and science in Norway, Denmark, Germany, the Netherlands, China, US, Russia and Britain and was one of the experts lecturing in Europe on the Eyjafjallajökull eruption in 2010. Ari Trausti frequently lectures on the volcanic activity in Iceland or is interviewed by the media on various volcanoes and volcanic eruptions as well as Icelandic glaciers. Recently, he worked on the high-tech LAVA exhibition in the town of Hvolsvöllur in South-Iceland.

== Relatives ==
Ari Trausti comes from a family of artists: his half-brother Erró is a postmodern painter and pop artist in Paris; their father, Guðmundur frá Miðdal, was well-known painter, sculptor, photographer and writer and his mother, Lydia, was a leading ceramist. Ari Trausti has four siblings.

== Personal life ==
Ari Trausti speaks fluent English, German, Danish, Norwegian and Swedish. In 1974 he married María G. Baldvinsdóttir. The family includes three children, Hulda Sóllilja, Huginn Þór and Helga Sigríður, as well as five grandchildren.

== See also ==
- List of Icelandic writers
- Katrín Jakobsdóttir
- Ragnar Th. Sigurðsson
- Left-Green Movement
