= Yucca Mountain nuclear waste repository =

Unused deep geological repository facility in Nevada, US

Coordinates: 36°51′10″N 116°25′36″W

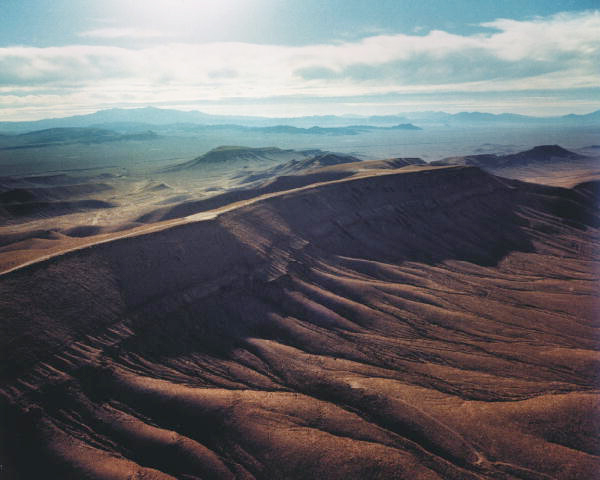
Yucca Mountain

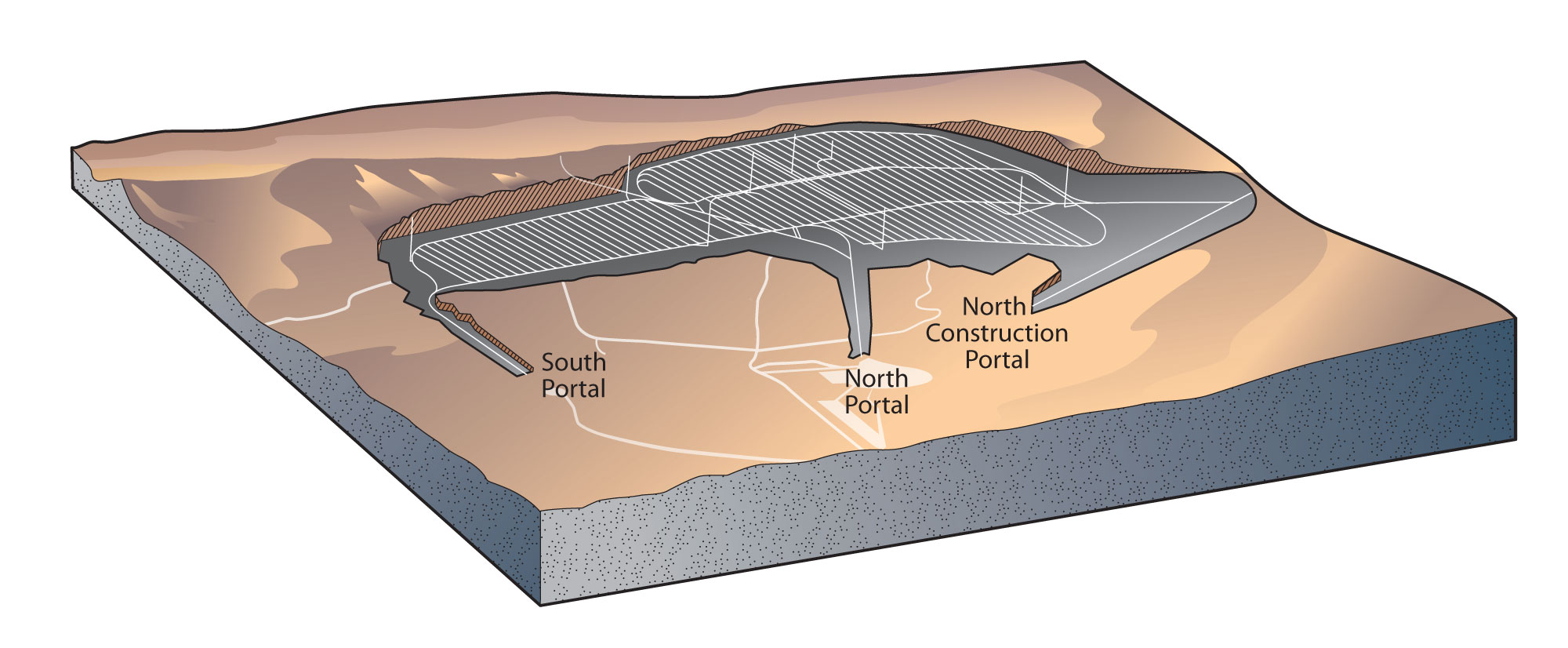
The proposed design

The Yucca Mountain Nuclear Waste Repository, as designated by the Nuclear Waste Policy Act amendments of 1987, is a proposed deep geological repository storage facility within Yucca Mountain for spent nuclear fuel and other high-level radioactive waste in the United States. The site is on federal land adjacent to the Nevada Test Site in Nye County, Nevada, about 80 mi (130 km) northwest of the Las Vegas Valley.

The project was approved in 2002 by the 107th United States Congress, but the 112th Congress ended federal funding for the site via amendment to the Department of Defense and Full-Year Continuing Appropriations Act, passed on April 14, 2011. The project has encountered many difficulties and was highly contested by the public, the Western Shoshone peoples, and many politicians. The project also faces strong state and regional opposition. The Government Accountability Office stated that the closure was for political, not technical or safety reasons.

This leaves the United States government (which disposes of its transuranic waste from nuclear weapons production 2,150 feet (660 m) below the surface at the Waste Isolation Pilot Plant in New Mexico) and American nuclear power plants without any designated long-term storage for their high-level radioactive waste (spent fuel) stored on-site in steel and concrete casks (dry cask storage) at 76 reactor sites in 34 states.

Under President Barack Obama, the U.S. Department of Energy (DOE) reviewed options other than Yucca Mountain for a high-level waste repository. The Blue Ribbon Commission on America's Nuclear Future, established by the secretary of energy, released its final report in January 2012. It detailed an urgent need to find a site suitable for constructing a consolidated geological repository, stating that any future facility should be developed by a new independent organization with direct access to the Nuclear Waste Fund, which is not subject to political and financial control as the Cabinet-level DOE is. But the site met with strong opposition in Nevada, including from then-Senate leader Harry Reid.

Under the first Donald Trump administration, the DOE terminated the Deep Borehole Field Test program and other non-Yucca Mountain waste disposition research activities. For FY18, the DOE requested $120 million and the U.S. Nuclear Regulatory Commission (NRC) $30 million from Congress to continue licensing activities for the Yucca Mountain Repository. For fiscal year 2019, the DOE again requested $120 million while the NRC increased its request to $47.7 million. Congress provided no funding for the remainder of fiscal year 2018. In May 2019, Representative John Shimkus reintroduced a bill in the U.S. House of Representatives for the site, but the Appropriation Committee killed an amendment by Representative Mike Simpson to add $74 million in Yucca Mountain funding to a DOE appropriations bill. On May 20, 2020, Under Secretary of Energy Mark W. Menezes testified in front of the Senate Energy and Natural Resources Committee that President Trump strongly opposes proceeding with the Yucca Mountain Repository.

In May 2021, Energy Secretary Jennifer Granholm said that Yucca Mountain would not be part of the Biden administration's plans for nuclear waste disposal. She anticipated announcing the department's next steps "in the coming months".

== Introduction ==
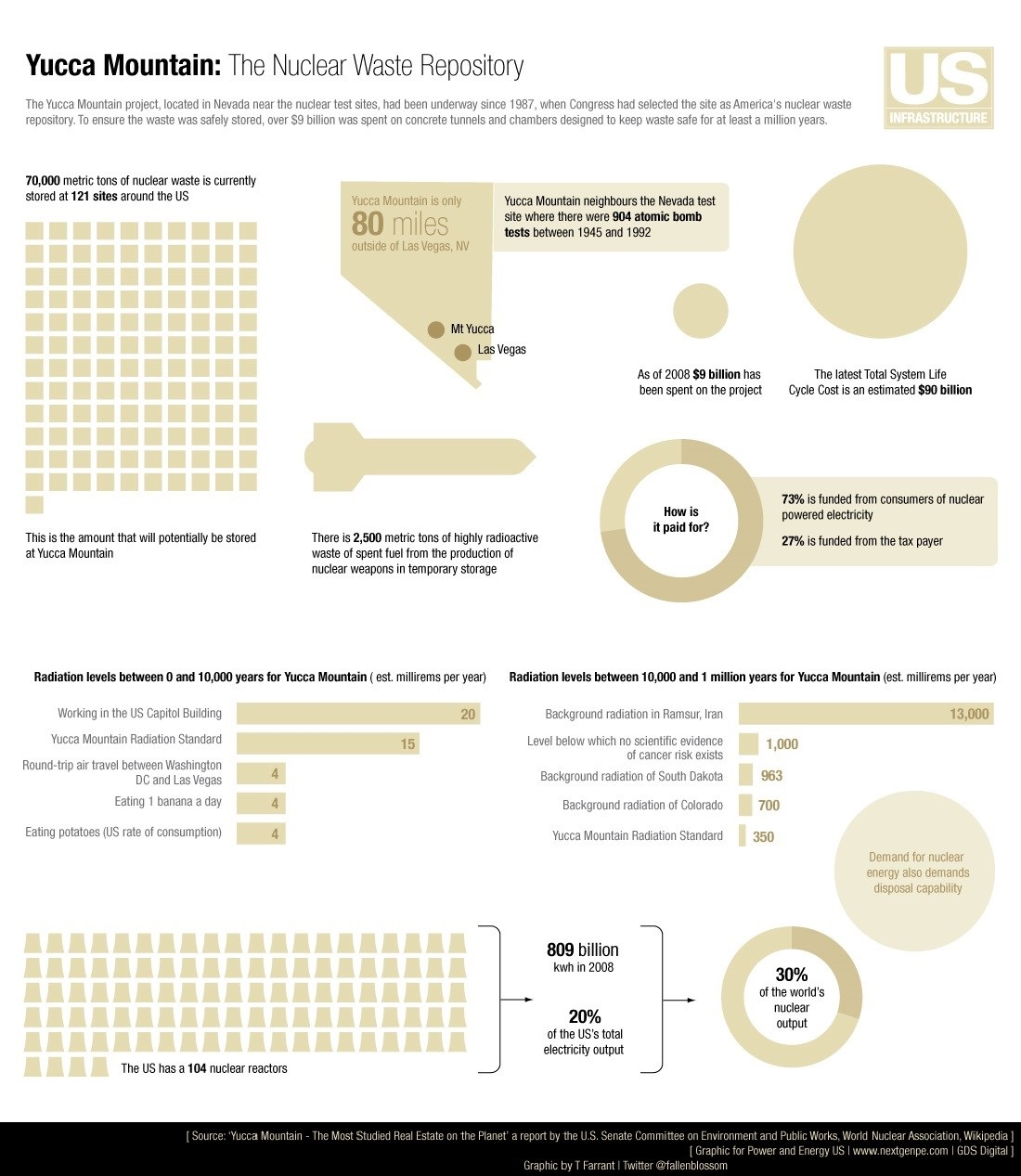
An infographic about the Yucca Mountain nuclear waste repository

Spent nuclear fuel is the radioactive byproduct of electricity generation at commercial nuclear power plants, and high-level radioactive waste is the byproduct of reprocessing spent fuel to produce fissile material for nuclear weapons. In 1982, Congress established a national policy to solve the problem of nuclear waste disposal. This policy is a federal law called the Nuclear Waste Policy Act, which made the U.S. Department of Energy (DOE) responsible for finding a site, building, and operating an underground disposal facility called a geologic repository. The recommendation to use a geologic repository dates to 1957, when the National Academy of Sciences recommended that the best way to protect the environment and public health and safety is to dispose of the waste in rock deep underground.

The DOE began studying Yucca Mountain in 1978 to determine whether it would be suitable for the nation's first long-term geologic repository for over 70,000 metric tons (69,000 long tons; 77,000 short tons) (150 million pounds) of spent nuclear fuel and high-level radioactive waste as of 2015 stored at 121 sites around the nation. An estimated 10,000 metric tons (9,800 long tons; 11,000 short tons) of the waste would be from U.S. military nuclear programs.

On December 19, 1984, the DOE selected ten locations in six states for consideration as potential repository sites, based on data collected for nearly ten years. The ten sites were studied and results of these preliminary studies were reported in 1985. Based on these reports, President Ronald Reagan approved three sites for intensive scientific study called site characterization. The three sites were Hanford, Washington; Deaf Smith County, Texas; and Yucca Mountain.

In 1987, Congress amended the Nuclear Waste Policy Act and directed DOE to study only Yucca Mountain, which is adjacent to the former nuclear test site. The Act provided that if during site characterization Yucca Mountain was found unsuitable, studies would stop immediately. This option expired when Reagan actually recommended the site. On July 23, 2002, President George W. Bush signed House Joint Resolution 87 (Pub. L. 107–200 (text) (PDF)), allowing the DOE to take the next step in establishing a safe repository in which to store nuclear waste. The DOE was to begin accepting spent fuel at the Yucca Mountain Repository by January 31, 1998, but did not do so because of a series of delays due to legal challenges, concerns over how to transport nuclear waste to the facility, and political pressure resulting in underfunding of the construction.

On July 18, 2006, the DOE proposed March 31, 2017, as the date to open the facility and begin accepting waste based on full funding. On September 8, 2006, Bush nominated Ward (Edward) Sproat, a nuclear industry executive formerly of PECO energy in Pennsylvania, to lead the Yucca Mountain Project. Following the 2006 midterm congressional elections, Harry Reid, a longtime opponent of the repository, became the Senate Majority Leader, putting him in a position to greatly affect the future of the project. Reid said he would continue to work to block completion of the project, and is quoted as having said, "Yucca Mountain is dead. It'll never happen."

In the 2008 Omnibus Spending Bill, the Yucca Mountain Project's budget was reduced to $390 million. The project was able to reallocate resources and delay transportation expenditures to complete the License Application for submission on June 3, 2008. During his 2008 presidential campaign, Barack Obama promised to abandon the project. After his election, the Nuclear Regulatory Commission told Obama he did not have the ability to do so. On April 23, 2009, Lindsey Graham and eight other U.S. senators introduced legislation to provide "rebates" from a $30 billion federally managed fund into which nuclear power plants had been paying, so as to refund all collected funds if Congress canceled the project.

In November 2013, in response to a lawsuit filed by the National Association of Regulatory Utility Commissioners and the Nuclear Energy Institute, the U.S. court of appeals ruled that nuclear utilities may stop paying into the nuclear waste recovery fund until either the DOE follows the Nuclear Waste Policy Act, which designates Yucca Mountain as the repository, or Congress changes the law. The fee ended May 16, 2014.

Lacking an operating repository, the federal government paid utility companies $5.3 billion between 1998 and 2015, in compensation for failing to comply with the contract it signed to take the spent nuclear fuel by 1998. For the ten years after 2015, it was estimated to cost taxpayers $24 billion in payments from the Judgment Fund. The Judgment Fund is not subject to budget rules, so payments therefrom have no impact on yearly spending for other programs.

== Facility ==
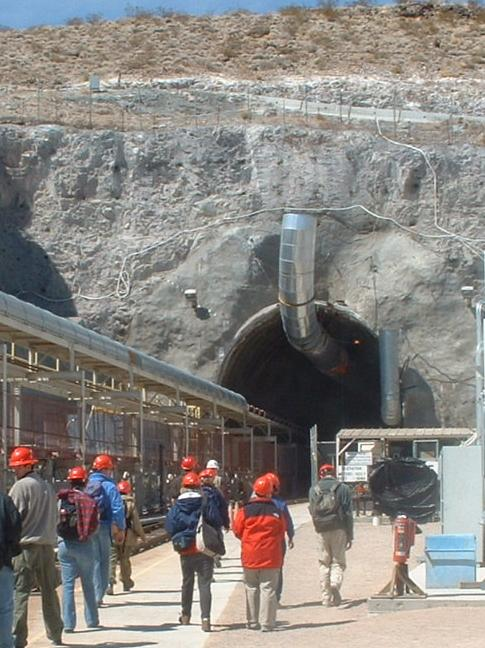
A tour group entering the North Portal of Yucca Mountain

The Yucca Mountain project's purpose is to comply with the Nuclear Waste Policy Act of 1982 by developing a national site for spent nuclear fuel and high-level radioactive waste storage. Since April 2009, the project's management and operating contractor has been USA Repository Services (USA-RS), a wholly owned subsidiary of URS Corporation (now part of AECOM), with supporting principal subcontractors Shaw Corporation (now part of McDermott International Inc.) and Areva Federal Services LLC (now Orano federal services business). Sandia National Laboratories was responsible for post-closure analysis and ensuring compliance with the NWPA.

The DOE constructed an Exploratory Studies Facility to enable access to investigate the site's suitability for hosting the repository. The actual repository facility would be constructed after completion of initial studies and granting of permission. The Exploratory Studies Facility's main tunnel is U-shaped, 5 mi (8.0 km) long and 25 ft (7.6 m) wide. After completing the Exploratory Studies Facility, the DOE excavated another, 1.7 mi (2.7 km)-long "cross-drift" tunnel to enable further studies of the rock and groundwater.

Several cathedral-like alcoves branch from the main tunnel. Most of the scientific experiments were conducted in these alcoves. The emplacement drifts (smaller-diameter tunnels branching off the main tunnel) where waste would have been stored were not constructed since they required authorization from the Nuclear Regulatory Commission. The repository has a statutory limit of 77,000 metric tons (85,000 short tons).

To store that much waste would require 40 miles (64 km) of tunnels. The Nuclear Waste Policy Act limits the repository's capacity to 63,000 metric tons (62,000 long tons; 69,000 short tons) of initial heavy metal in commercial spent fuel. The 104 U.S. commercial reactors then operating were expected to produce this quantity of spent fuel by 2014, assuming that the spent fuel rods are not reprocessed. Currently, the US has no civil reprocessing plant.

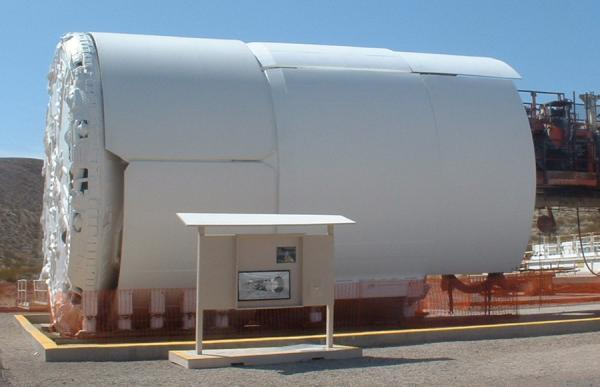
The tunnel boring machine on display at the exit of the tunnel

The tunnel boring machine (TBM) that excavated the main tunnel cost $13 million (equivalent to $21 million in 2025) and was 400 ft (120 m) long when in operation. It now sits at its exit point at the facility's South Portal (south entrance). The short side tunnel alcoves were excavated using explosives.

== Project funding and progress ==
The facility's cost is being paid for by a combination of a tax on each kilowatt hour of nuclear power and by taxpayers for disposal of weapons and naval nuclear waste. Based on the 2001 cost estimate, about 73% is funded by consumers of nuclear-powered electricity and 27% by taxpayers.

By 2007, the DOE announced it was seeking to double the size of the Yucca Mountain repository to a capacity of 135,000 metric tons (149,000 short tons), or 300 million pounds.

By 2008, Yucca Mountain was one of the most studied pieces of geology in the world; between geologic studies and materials science, the U.S. had invested $9 billion (equivalent to $13 billion in 2025) in the project. This site studied by the Nevada Bureau of Mines and Geology (NBMG) differs substantially from other potential repositories because of its natural analogues of nuclear material. The DOE estimates that it has over 100 million gallons of highly radioactive waste and 2,500 metric tons (2,800 short tons) of spent fuel from the production of nuclear weapons and from research activities in temporary storage.

The total system life cycle cost presented to Congress in July 2008 was $96 billion in 2007 dollars ($149 billion in 2025). This was an increase from the 2001 estimate of $70 billion in 2007 dollars ($109 billion in 2025), which was attributed primarily to a 26% increase in capacity, as well as "further refinement and specificity in system designs since the 2001 estimate". Additionally, the cost of the project continued to escalate because of insufficient funding to most efficiently complete the project.

=== Developments under the Obama administration ===
Starting in 2009, the Obama administration attempted to close the Yucca Mountain repository, despite US law that designates Yucca Mountain as the nation's nuclear waste repository. The administration agency, DOE, began implementation of the President's plan in May 2009. The Nuclear Regulatory Commission also went along with the administration's closure plan. Various state and congressional entities attempted to challenge the administration's closure plans, by statute and in court.

In August 2013, a US Court of Appeals decision told the NRC and the Obama administration that they must either "approve or reject [DOE's] application for [the] never-completed waste storage site at Nevada's Yucca Mountain." They cannot simply make plans for its closure in violation of US law.

In May 2009, then United States Secretary of Energy Steven Chu stated:

Yucca Mountain as a repository is off the table. What we're going to be doing is saying, let's step back. We realize that we know a lot more today than we did 25 or 30 years ago. The NRC is saying that the dry cask storage at current sites would be safe for many decades, so that gives us time to figure out what we should do for a long-term strategy. We will be assembling a blue-ribbon panel to look at the issue. We're looking at reactors that have a high-energy neutron spectrum that can actually allow you to burn down the long-lived actinide waste. These are fast-neutron reactors. There's others: a resurgence of hybrid solutions of fusion fission where the fusion would impart not only energy, but again creates high-energy neutrons that can burn down the long-lived actinides. ...

Some of the waste is already vitrified. There is, in my mind, no economical reason why you would ever think of pulling it back into a potential fuel cycle. So one could well imagine—again, it depends on what the blue-ribbon panel says—one could well imagine that for a certain classification for a certain type of waste, you don't want to have access to it anymore, so that means you could use different sites than Yucca Mountain, such as salt domes. Once you put it in there, the salt oozes around it. These are geologically stable for a 50 to 100 million year time scale. The trouble with those type of places for repositories is you don't have access to it anymore. But say for certain types of waste you don't want to have access to it anymore—that's good. It's a very natural containment. ... whereas there would be other waste where you say it has some inherent value, let's keep it around for a hundred years, two hundred years, because there's a high likelihood we'll come back to it and want to recover that.

So the real thing is, let's get some really wise heads together and figure out how you want to deal with the interim and long-term storage. Yucca was supposed to be everything to everybody, and I think, knowing what we know today, there's going to have to be several regional areas.

After the layoff of 800 employees on March 31, 2009, about 100 employees remained on the project until all technical staff were laid off by the end of fiscal year 2010 due to zero funding in the 2011 budget for the Office of Civilian Radioactive Waste Management. The Office of Civilian Radioactive Waste Management was closed and its remaining functions transferred to the Office of Nuclear Energy.

In 2008, the U.S. Senate Committee on Environmental and Public Works found that failure to perform to contractual requirements could cost taxpayers up to $11 billion by 2020. In 2013, this estimate of taxpayer liability was raised to $21 billion. In July 2009, the House of Representatives voted 388 to 30 on amendments to HHR3183 (Roll call vote 591, via Clerk.House.gov) to not defund the Yucca Mountain repository in the FY2010 budget. In 2013, the House of Representatives voted twice during the 2014 Energy and Water Appropriations debate by over 80% majority to reject elimination of Yucca Mountain as the nation's only nuclear waste solution.

On April 13, 2010, the state of Washington filed suit to prevent the closing of Yucca Mountain, since this would slow efforts to clean up the Hanford Nuclear Reservation. South Carolina, Aiken County (the location of the Savannah River site) and others joined Washington state in the suit. The United States Court of Appeals for the District of Columbia Circuit dismissed the suit in July 2011, saying the Nuclear Regulatory Commission had not ruled on the withdrawal of the license application. Washington and South Carolina filed another lawsuit on July 29.

With $32 billion received from power companies to fund the project, and $12 billion spent to study and build it, the federal government had $27 billion left, including interest. In March 2012, Senator Lindsey Graham introduced a bill requiring three-fourths of that money to be given back to customers, and the remainder to the companies for storage improvements.

In August 2013, the U.S. Court of Appeals for the District of Columbia ordered the Nuclear Regulatory Commission (NRC) to either "approve or reject [DOE's] application for [the] never-completed waste storage site at Yucca Mountain." The court opinion said that the NRC was "simply flouting the law" in its previous action to allow the Obama administration to continue plans to close the proposed waste site since a federal law designating Yucca Mountain as the nation's nuclear waste repository remains in effect. The court opinion stated that "The president may not decline to follow a statutory mandate or prohibition simply because of policy objections."

In response, the NRC issued the final volumes of the Yucca Mountain Safety Evaluation Report (SER), which included the NRC staff's statement that the site would meet all applicable standards. At the same time, the staff also stated that the NRC should not authorize construction of the repository until the requirements for land and water rights were met and a supplement to DOE's environmental impact statement (EIS) was finished. On March 3, 2015, the NRC ordered the staff to complete the supplemental EIS and make the Yucca Mountain licensing document database publicly available, using all the remaining previously appropriated licensing funds.

In March 2015, Senator Lamar Alexander introduced the Nuclear Waste Administration Act of 2015 (S854) in the U.S. Senate. It was intended to establish a fully independent Nuclear Waste Administration (NWA) that would develop nuclear waste storage and disposal facilities. Construction of such facilities would require the consent of the state, local, and tribal governments that may be affected. The NWA would be required to complete a mission plan to open a pilot storage facility by 2021 for nuclear waste from non-operating reactors and other "emergency" deliveries (called "priority waste").

The goal would be to have a storage facility for waste from operating reactors or other "non-priority waste" available by 2025, and an actual permanent repository by the end of 2048. The current disposal limit of 70,000 metric tons for the nation's initial permanent repository would be repealed. Any nuclear waste fees collected after S.854 was enacted would be held in a newly established Working Capital Fund. The Nuclear Waste Administration would be allowed to draw from that fund any amounts needed to carry out S.854, unless limited by annual appropriations or authorizations. S.854 died in committee.

As of September 30, 2021, the Nuclear Waste Fund had an investment fair value of $52.4 billion.

=== Developments under the first Trump administration ===
On March 15, 2017, the Trump administration announced it would request congressional approval for $120 million to restart licensing activity at the Yucca Mountain repository, with funding also to be used to create an interim storage program. The project would consolidate nuclear waste across the United States in Yucca Mountain, which had been stockpiled in local locations since 2010. The federal budget proposal was refused by the U.S. Senate. Although his administration had allocated money to the project, in October 2018, President Donald Trump stated he opposed the use of Yucca mountain for dumping, saying he agreed "with the people of Nevada."

On May 11, 2018, the bill H.R. 3053 was approved in a 340–72 vote in the U.S. House of Representatives. The bill directed the DOE to resume the licensing process for Yucca Mountain, with licensing for a permanent site at the mountain to "take up to five years." The Nuclear Waste Policy Amendments Act was sponsored by John Shimkus. The Hill clarified that the bill would "set a path forward for the DOE to resume the process of planning for and building the southern Nevada site, transfer land to the DOE for it, ease the federal funding mechanism and allow DOE to build or license a temporary site to store waste while the Yucca project is being planned and built."

The bill would "direct [the DOE] to revive the licensing process for Yucca Mountain to be designated as the country’s permanent site for nuclear waste." The bill would bring together waste from 121 locations in 39 states. All Nevada representatives opposed the bill. The measure was scheduled to go to the U.S. Senate next, and if passed there, would require the Nuclear Regulatory Commission to decide on the matter within 30 months.

The Hill noted that the bill received widespread support from lawmakers arguing that nuclear waste was best transferred out of their districts to Yucca Mountain, a concept opposed by Nevada representatives, with politicians such as Dina Titus dubbing it the "Screw Nevada 2.0" bill. Titus proposed an amendment that would have required long-term storage to be kept in locales that consented, which the U.S. House of Representatives rejected, 332–80. In their opposition to the use of Yucca Mountain as a nuclear repository, Nevada representatives were supported by U.S. Senator Dianne Feinstein of California and other politicians.

In June 2018, the Trump administration and some members of Congress again began proposing using Yucca Mountain, with Nevada Senators raising opposition. By early 2019, use of Yucca Mountain was in "political limbo" as opposition to the site led to an impasse. In January 2019, a panel of scientists introduced to Congress a 126-page report, Reset of America’s Nuclear Waste Management, which proposed including Yucca Mountain as a potential repository with "development of a consensus-based siting process, but one that would still include Yucca Mountain as a candidate."

Nevada National Security Site officials in April 2019 assured the public that the Device Assembly Facility on the Nevada security site was safe from earthquake threats. In contrast, Nevada officials claimed seismic activity in the region made it unsafe for the storage of nuclear waste. On April 1, 2019, the Las Vegas Review-Journal noted that "Nevada Democrats in the House" were seeking to block transfers of plutonium from the DOE into the state by the use of the appropriations process.

== Opposition ==
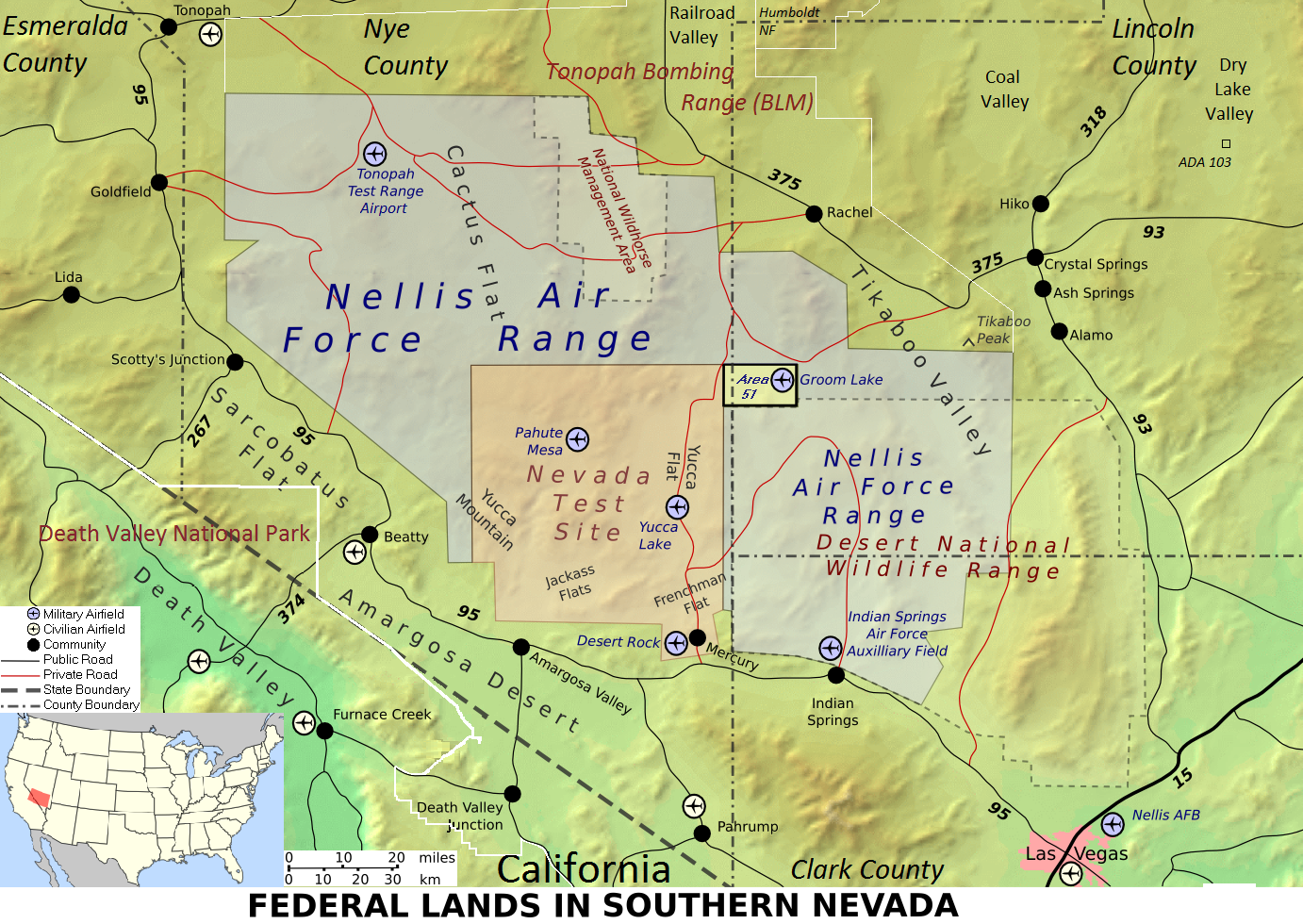
A map showing Yucca Mountain in southern Nevada, west of the Nevada Test Site

The DOE was scheduled to begin accepting spent fuel at the Yucca Mountain repository by January 31, 1998 (28 years ago). By 2010, the future status of the repository at Yucca Mountain was still unknown due to ongoing litigation and Senator Reid's opposition.

Because of construction delays, several U.S. nuclear power plants have resorted to dry cask storage of waste on-site indefinitely in steel and concrete casks.

The project is widely opposed in Nevada and hotly debated nationwide. 58% of Nevadans oppose opening the facility for storing nuclear waste (51% "strongly"), with only one-third in favor. Representative Shelley Berkley called it "unfair" for Nevada to be singled out as the only possible location for storage of the waste. Many Nevadans' opposition stems from the so-called "Screw Nevada Bill", the 1987 legislation halting study of Hanford and Texas as potential sites for the waste before conclusions could be made. The county containing the proposed facility, Nye County, supports the repository's development, as do six adjoining counties. A 2015 survey of Nevadans found 55% agreeing that the state should be open to discussion of the repository's benefits.

One point of concern has been the standard of radiation emission in 10,000 to 1,000,000 years. On August 9, 2005, the United States Environmental Protection Agency (EPA) proposed a limit of 350 millirem per year for that period. In October 2007, the DOE issued a draft of the Supplemental Environmental Impact Statement showing that the mean dose to a reasonably maximally exposed individual member of the public would not exceed 0.24 mrem/year for the first 10,000 years and 2.3 mrem/year thereafter. Both are substantially below the proposed EPA limit. By comparison, a hip X-ray results in a dose around 83 mrem and a CT head or chest scan results in around 1,110 mrem. Annually, in the United States, an individual's dose from background radiation is about 350 mrem, though some places get more than twice that.

On February 12, 2002, Secretary of Energy Spencer Abraham deemed this site suitable as the nation's nuclear repository. The governor of Nevada had 90 days to object and did so, but Congress overrode the objection. If the governor's objection had stood, the project would have been abandoned and a new site chosen. In August 2004, the repository became an election issue when John Kerry, the Democratic nominee for president, said he would abandon the plans if elected.

In March 2005, the U.S. Energy and Interior departments revealed that several U.S. Geological Survey hydrologists had exchanged emails discussing possible falsification of quality assurance documents on water infiltration research. [https://www.nwtrb.gov/docs/default-source/reports/nwtrb_infiltration_evaluation.pdf?sfvrsn=9] On February 17, 2006, the DOE's Office of Civilian Radioactive Waste Management (OCRWM) released a report confirming the technical soundness of infiltration modeling work performed by U.S. Geological Survey (USGS) employees. In March 2006, the U.S. Senate Committee on Environment and Public Works Majority Staff issued a white paper, "Yucca Mountain: The Most Studied Real Estate on the Planet". The conclusions were:

- Extensive studies consistently show Yucca Mountain to be a sound site for nuclear waste disposal
- The cost of not moving forward is extremely high
- Nuclear waste disposal capability is an environmental imperative
- Nuclear waste disposal capability supports national security
- Demand for new nuclear plants also demands disposal capability

On January 18, 2006, DOE OCRWM announced that it would designate Sandia National Laboratories as its lead laboratory to integrate repository science work for the Yucca Mountain Project. OCRWM Acting Director Paul Golan said: "We believe that establishing Sandia as our lead laboratory is an important step in our new path forward. The independent, expert review that the scientists at Sandia will perform will help ensure that the technical and scientific basis for the Yucca Mountain repository is without question. Sandia has unique experience in managing scientific investigations in support of a federally licensed geologic disposal facility, having served in that role as the scientific advisor to the Waste Isolation Pilot Plant in Carlsbad, New Mexico." Sandia began acting as the lead laboratory on October 1, 2006.

Because of questions the State of Nevada and members of Congress asked about the quality of the science behind the Yucca Mountain Project, the DOE announced on March 31, 2006, the selection of Oak Ridge Associated Universities/Oak Ridge Institute for Science and Education (a not-for-profit consortium that includes 96 doctoral degree-granting institutions and 11 associate member universities) to provide expert reviews of scientific and technical work on the Yucca Mountain Project. DOE said the project "will be based on sound science. By bringing in Oak Ridge for review of technical work, DOE will seek to present a high level of expertise and credibility as they move the project forward ... This award gives DOE access to academic and research institutions to help DOE meet their mission and legal obligation to license, construct, and open Yucca Mountain as the nation's repository for spent nuclear fuel."

There was significant public and political opposition to the project in Nevada. An attempt was made to move ahead with it and override the opposition, but the local opposition prevailed.

On March 5, 2009, U.S. Energy Secretary Steven Chu reiterated in a Senate hearing that the Yucca Mountain site was no longer considered an option for storing reactor waste.

On March 3, 2010, the DOE filed a motion with the NRC to withdraw its license application, but states, counties, and individuals nationwide have sued on the grounds that the NWPA did not authorize the motion.

The costly 2014 nuclear accident at the New Mexico Waste Isolation Pilot Plant, in which a nuclear waste container exploded, caused doubt that it could serve as an alternative to Yucca Mountain.

In January 2019, Nevada Governor Steve Sisolak said that "not one ounce" of nuclear waste would be allowed at Yucca Mountain, and a May funding bill did not include funding for the site. In May, the Reno Gazette-Journal published a long-form essay cataloging opposition to the Yucca Mountain project. According to a tribal elder, the Western Shoshone view Yucca Mountain as sacred and believe a nuclear storage facility "will poison everything. It's people's life, our Mother Earth's life, all the living things here, all the creatures; whatever's crawling around, it's their life too." The tribes say they lack funds to discredit federal safety claims but would be directly affected by a disaster.

== Radiation standards ==
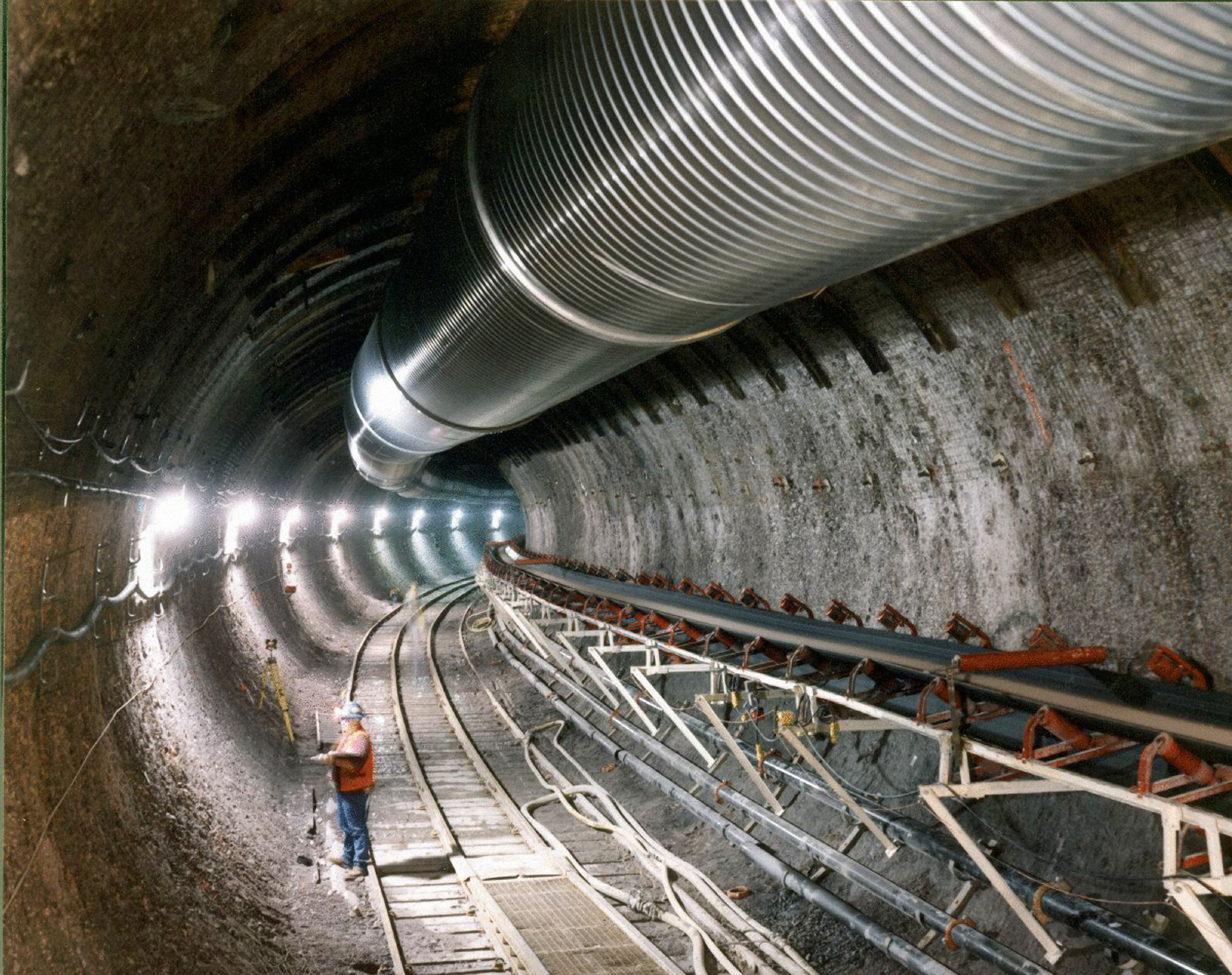
A tunnel inside the Exploratory Studies Facility.

=== Original standard ===
The EPA established its Yucca Mountain standards in June 2001. The storage standard set a dose limit of 15 millirem per year for the public outside the Yucca Mountain site. The disposal standards consisted of three components: an individual dose standard, a standard evaluating the impacts of human intrusion into the repository, and a groundwater protection standard. The individual-protection and human intrusion standards set a limit of 15 millirem per year to a reasonably maximally exposed individual, who would be among the most highly exposed members of the public.

The groundwater protection standard is consistent with the EPA Safe Drinking Water Act standards, which EPA applies in many situations as a pollution prevention measure. The disposal standards were to apply for 10,000 years after the facility is closed. Dose assessments were to continue beyond 10,000 years and be placed in DOE's Environmental Impact Statement, but were not subject to a compliance standard.

The 10,000-year period for compliance assessment is consistent with EPA's generally applicable standards developed under the Nuclear Waste Policy Act. It also reflects international guidance regarding the level of confidence that can be placed in numerical projections over very long periods.

=== Inconsistent standards ===
Shortly after the EPA established these standards in 2001, the nuclear industry, several environmental and public interest groups, and the State of Nevada challenged the standards in court. In July 2004, the Court of Appeals for the District of Columbia Circuit found in favor of the EPA on all counts except one: the 10,000 year regulatory time frame. The court ruled that EPA's 10,000-year compliance period for isolation of radioactive waste was not consistent with National Academy of Sciences (NAS) recommendations and was too short.

The NAS report had recommended standards be set for the time of peak risk, which might approach a period of one million years. By limiting the compliance time to 10,000 years, EPA did not respect a statutory requirement that it develop standards consistent with NAS recommendations.

=== EPA's rule ===
In 2009, EPA published a final rule in the U.S. Federal Register. The rule limits radiation doses from Yucca Mountain for up to 1,000,000 years after it closes. Within that regulatory time frame, the EPA has two dose standards that would apply based on the number of years from the time the facility closes.

For the first 10,000 years, the EPA would retain the 2001 final rule's dose limit of 15 millirem per year. This is protection at the level of the most stringent radiation regulations in the U.S. today. From 10,000 to one million years, EPA established a dose limit of 100 millirem per year. EPA's rule requires DOE to show that Yucca Mountain can safely contain wastes, considering the effects of earthquakes, volcanic activity, climate change, and container corrosion, over one million years. The current analysis indicates that the repository will cause less than 1 mrem/year public dose for 1,000,000 years.

== Geology ==
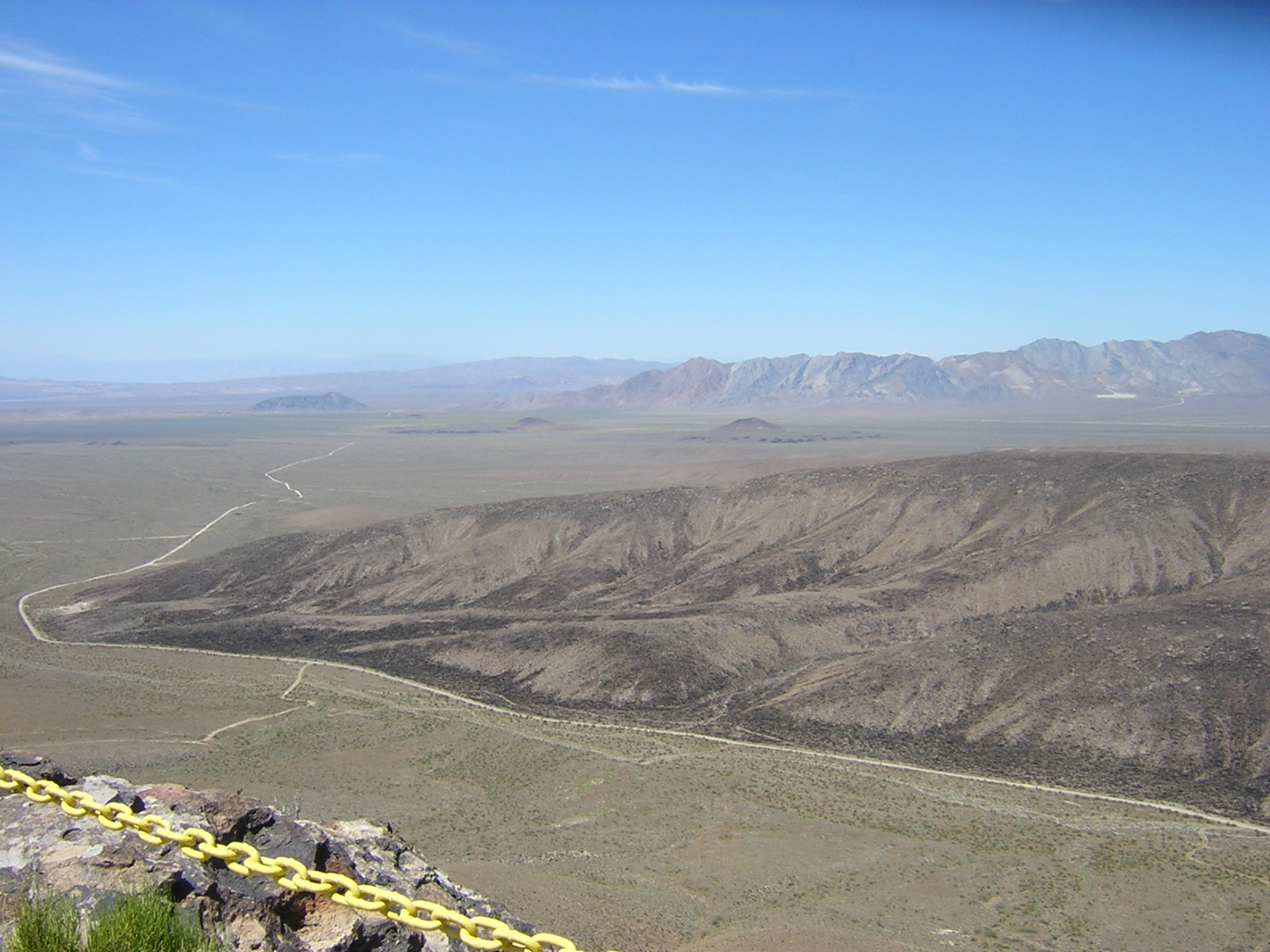
Looking west atop Yucca Mountain

The formation that makes up Yucca Mountain was created by several large eruptions from a caldera volcano and is composed of alternating layers of ignimbrite (welded tuff), non-welded tuff, and semi-welded tuff. The tuff surrounding the burial sites is expected to protect human health as it provides a natural barrier to the radiation. It lies along the transition between the Mojave and the Great Basin Deserts.

The volcanic tuff at Yucca Mountain is appreciably fractured and the water moves through an aquifer below the waste repository primarily through fractures. While the fractures are usually confined to individual layers of tuff, the faults extend from the planned storage area to the water table 600 to 1,500 ft (180 to 460 m) below the surface. Future water transport from the surface to waste containers is likely to be dominated by fractures. There is evidence that surface water has been transported down through the 700 ft (210 m) of overburden to the exploratory tunnel at Yucca Mountain in less than 50 years.

The aquifer of Yucca Mountain drains to Amargosa Valley, home to over 1,400 people and several endangered species.

Some site opponents say that, after the predicted containment failure of the waste containers, these cracks may provide a route for movement of radioactive waste that dissolves in the water flowing downward from the desert surface. Officials say the waste containers will be stored in such a way as to minimize or even nearly eliminate this possibility.

The area around Yucca Mountain received much more rain in the geologic past and the water table was consequently much higher than it is today, though well below the level of the repository.

=== Earthquakes ===
The DOE has said that seismic and tectonic effects on the natural systems at Yucca Mountain will not significantly affect repository performance. Yucca Mountain lies in a region of ongoing tectonic deformation, but the deformation rates are too slow to significantly affect the mountain during the 10,000-year regulatory compliance period. Rises in the water table caused by seismic activity would be, at most, a few tens of meters and would not reach the repository. The fractured and faulted volcanic tuff that Yucca Mountain comprises reflects the occurrence of many earthquake-faulting and strong ground motion events during the last several million years, and seismic events in the next 10,000 years would not significantly change the rock's hydrological characteristics. The engineered barrier system components will reportedly provide substantial protection of the waste from seepage water, even under severe seismic loading.

In 2007, it was discovered that the Bow Ridge fault line runs beneath the facility, hundreds of feet east of where it was originally thought to be, under a storage pad where spent radioactive fuel canisters would be cooled before being sealed in a maze of tunnels. The discovery required several structures to be moved several hundred feet further east, and drew criticism from Robert R. Loux, then head of the Nevada Agency for Nuclear Projects, who said Yucca administrators should have known about the fault line's location years earlier and called the movement of the structures "just-in-time engineering".

In 2008, a major nuclear equipment supplier, Holtec International, criticized the DOE's safety plan for handling containers of radioactive waste before they are buried at the proposed Yucca Mountain Project. The concern is that, in an earthquake, the unanchored casks of nuclear waste material awaiting burial at Yucca Mountain could be sent into a "chaotic melee of bouncing and rolling juggernauts".

== Transportation of waste ==
The nuclear waste was planned to be shipped to the site by rail and/or truck in robust containers known as spent nuclear fuel shipping casks, approved by the U.S. Nuclear Regulatory Commission. While the routes in Nevada would have been public, in the other states the planned routes, dates and times of transport would have been secret for security reasons. State and tribal representatives would have been notified before shipments of spent nuclear fuel entered their jurisdictions.

=== Nevada routes ===
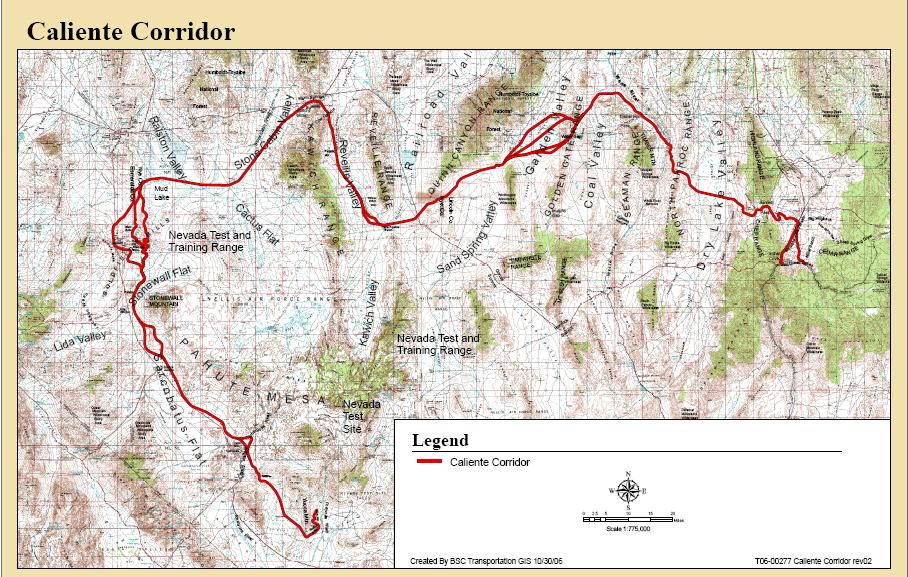
The proposed transportation route of spent nuclear fuel through Nevada

Within Nevada, the planned primary mode of transportation was via rail through the Caliente Corridor. This corridor starts in Caliente, Nevada, traveling along the northern and western borders of the Nevada Test Site for approximately 200 miles (320 km) before turning south.

Other options that were considered included a rail route along the Mina corridor. This route would have originated at the Fort Churchill Siding rail line near Wabuska, proceeded southeast through Hawthorne, Blair Junction, Lida Junction and Oasis Valley, and turned north-northeast toward Yucca Mountain. The DOE's use of this corridor would have required the Walker River Paiute Tribe's permission. As the U.S. Department of Defense (DoD) owns the first 54 miles (87 km) of the proposed corridor, the DoD's permission would also be required.

The Nevada Center for Biological Diversity and the Nevada Attorney General have expressed concern about the transportation routes "through any number of sensitive habitats".

=== Impacts ===
Since the early 1960s, the U.S. has safely conducted more than 3,000 shipments of spent nuclear fuel without any harmful release of radioactive material. This safety record is comparable to the worldwide experience; since 1970, more than 70,000 metric tons of spent nuclear fuel have been transported, an amount approximately equal to the total amount of spent nuclear fuel that would have been shipped to Yucca Mountain.

But cities were still concerned about the transport of radioactive waste on highways and railroads that may have passed through heavily populated areas. Robert Halstead, a transportation adviser to the state of Nevada since 1988, said of transportation of the high-level waste: "They would heavily affect cities like Buffalo, Cleveland, Pittsburgh, in the Chicago metropolitan area, in Omaha [...] Coming out of the south, the heaviest impacts would be in Atlanta, in Nashville, St. Louis, Kansas City, moving across through Salt Lake City, through downtown Las Vegas, up to Yucca Mountain. And the same cities would be affected by rail shipments as well." Spencer Abraham said, "I think there's a general understanding that we move hazardous materials in this country, an understanding that the federal government knows how to do it safely."

In October 2018, a state senator from Utah argued that transferring nuclear waste from other states to Yucca Mountain on state highways and railways could be a health hazard.

== Cultural impact ==
Archeological surveys have found evidence that Native Americans used the immediate vicinity of Yucca Mountain on a temporary or seasonal basis. Some Native Americans disagree with archeological investigators' conclusions that their ancestors were highly mobile groups of hunter-gatherers who occupied the Yucca Mountain area before Euroamericans began using it for prospecting, surveying, and ranching. They believe that these conclusions overlook traditional accounts of farming that occurred before European contact.

Yucca Mountain and surrounding lands were central in the lives of the Southern Paiute, Western Shoshone, and Owens Valley Paiute and Shoshone peoples, who shared them for religious ceremonies, resource uses, and social events.

== See also ==
- Horizontal drillhole disposal
- Deep geological repository
- Deep borehole disposal
- Anti-nuclear movement in the United States
- Bullfrog County, Nevada
- Gudmundur S. (Bo) Bodvarsson
- High-level radioactive waste management
- Hui-Hai Liu
- List of nuclear waste treatment technologies
- Morris Operation, Illinois
- Onkalo spent nuclear fuel repository, Finland, the world's first repository
- Waste Isolation Pilot Plant, New Mexico
- Yucca Mountain Johnny
