= Guðmundur frá Miðdal =

Icelandic artist (1895–1963)

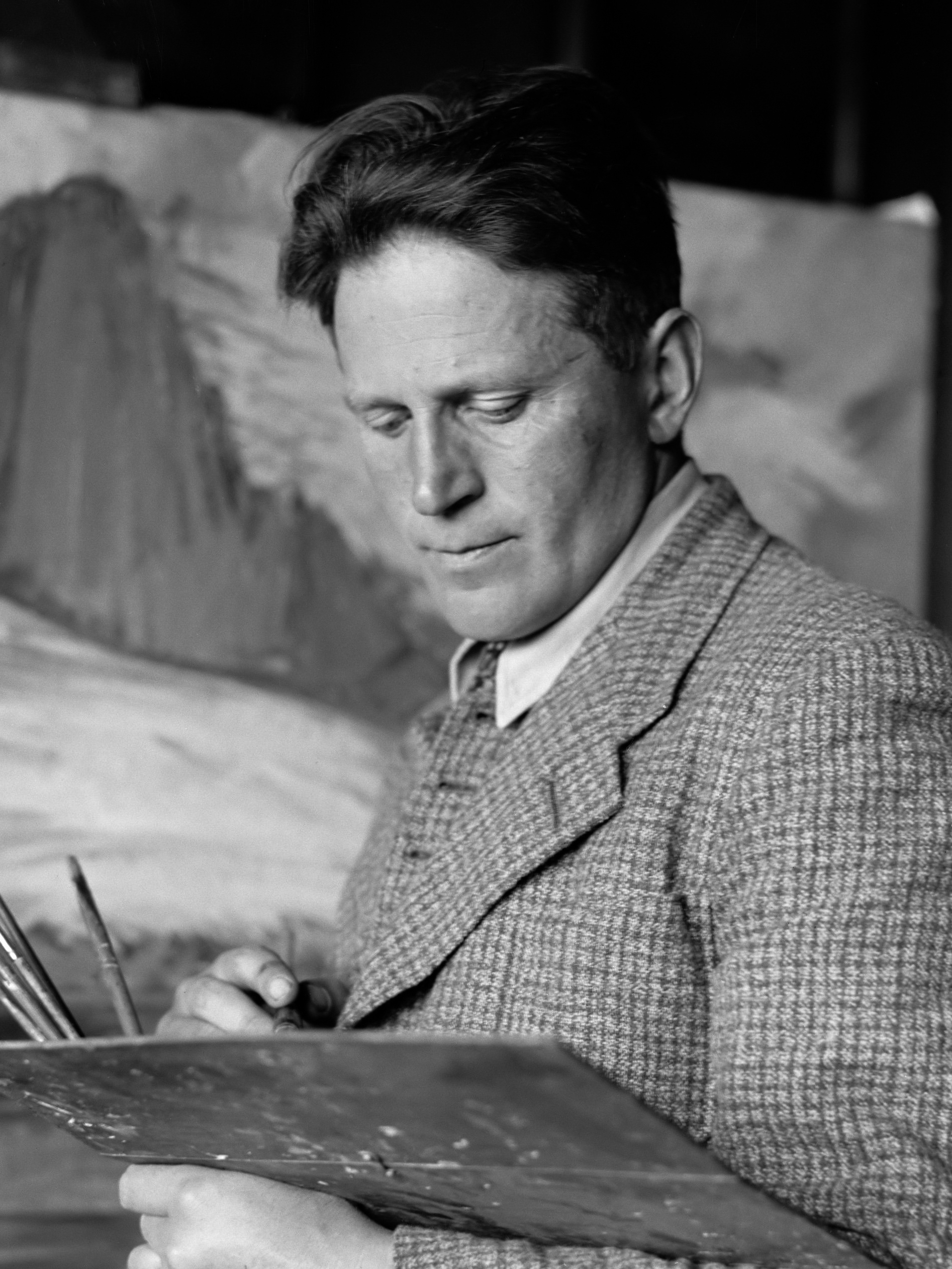
Guðmundur Einarsson (1934)

Guðmundur Einarsson, known as Guðmundur frá Miðdal (en. Guðmundur from Miðdalur) (August 5, 1895 – May 23, 1963) was an Icelandic artist. He worked in a variety of media, including painting, sculpture, graphics, ceramics, photography, and film, and was also a mountaineer and an author.

== Life and career ==
Guðmundur studied art in Iceland in 1911-13 (with Stefán Eiríksson) and 1916 (with Ríkarður Jónsson and Þórarinn B. Þorláksson), in Copenhagen in 1919-20 and in Munich in 1920–25.

He worked in media including graphics, watercolors and oils, sculpture, glass, copper, silver, and ceramics as well as photography and film. He was a pioneer of ceramics in Iceland. He also designed jewelry, furniture, gardens, and houses and wrote books, including poetry and the 1946 Fjallamenn, illustrated with his photographs. His style was eclectic and influenced by romanticism; late in his life he also produced abstract works.

His work has been exhibited at the Oslo Kunstforening in Norway and Galerie Paulus in Germany and in group exhibitions including at the Tate Gallery in England and the Kunsthalle Helsinki in Finland. The National Museum of Iceland has a collection of his photographs and the Icelandic Film Museum of his films.

Guðmundur was also a pioneer of mountaineering in Iceland, an explorer and conservationist, and a keen hunter.

== Personal life ==
In 1926 Guðmundur married Therese Zeitner, a Bohemian model who was previously married to the chemist Paul Sternberg. They subsequently divorced, and he remarried to her daughter Lydia Zeitner-Sternberg, a ceramicist who had come to Iceland in 1929 and was the mother of his son Einar. They had a further two sons and one daughter, including the geologist and author Ari Trausti Guðmundsson. Guðmundur also had a son, Guðmundur, the artist Erró, by Soffía Kristinsdóttir. Zeitner continued to live in the household until her death; Zeitner-Sternberg's autobiography, Lífsganga Lydiu, was published in 1992.
