= Yucca Mountain Johnny =

Cartoon miner

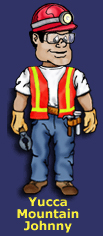
Yucca Mountain Johnny, the cartoon miner.

Yucca Mountain Johnny is a cartoon miner created by the United States Department of Energy (DOE) to present information to children on nuclear waste disposal and the Yucca Mountain Project. Serving as the virtual guide for the DOE's Youth Zone web site and appearing "live-action" in Nevada schools, Yucca Mountain Johnny has drawn harsh criticism as a propaganda tool.

Former U.S. Representative Shelley Berkley (D-NV) called Yucca Mountain Johnny "the Department of Energy's Joe Camel", a reference to a cartoon mascot for the tobacco industry which drew criticism for targeting children. Former Representative Jon Porter (R-NV) stated that "to sell the Yucca Mountain Project to our children through the use of a cartoon character is an irresponsible and desperate act."

DOE spokesperson Craig Stevens, however, defended Yucca Mountain Johnny, arguing that it "teaches hydrology, geology, and earth science", and that it is "part of our duty to explain to the public what we're doing." Support for Yucca Mountain Johnny was present in the House of Representatives, with Representative Joe Barton (R-TX) stating that "nobody questions the accuracy or truth of what's on the Web site", and Representative David Hobson (R-OH) stating that it "may have a place in teaching kids."

Berkley, who is a vocal opponent of a Yucca Mountain waste repository, attempted to add an amendment to an energy spending bill that would have prevented the funds from being used for the DOE Youth Zone web site. The amendment was defeated, 271–147.

The Youth Zone now appears to have been removed from the DOE's website, although copies of the site can be found via the Wayback Machine.

== See also ==
- Yucca Mountain
