= Klassart =

Icelandic blues band formed in 2006

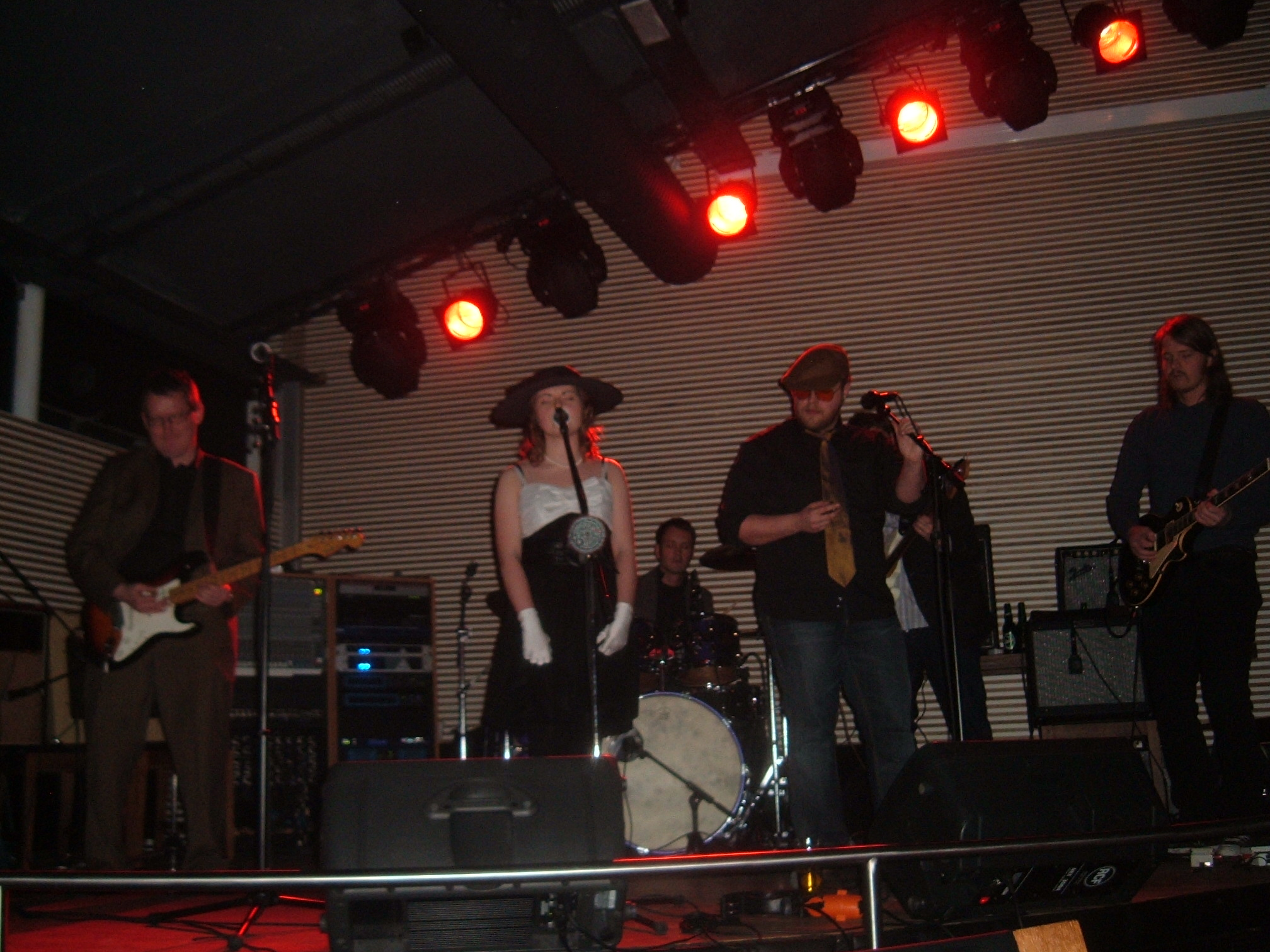
- Klassart live at the Icelandic Blues Festival 2008

Background information
- Origin: Sandgerði, Iceland
- Genres: Blues
- Years active: 2006–present
- Label: Geimsteinn
- Members: Smári Guðmundsson (lead guitar); Fríða Dís Guðmundsdóttir (lead vocals); Pálmar Guðmundsson (bass guitar); Hlynur Þór Valsson (backing vocals); Ólafur Þór Ólafsson (guitar); Ólafur Ingólfsson (drums)
- Website: www.myspace.com/fridaklassart

Klassart is an Icelandic blues band formed in Sandgerði on 19 November 2006. The band's lyrics are mostly in English, except for the song "Örlagablús", even though all members are native Icelanders.

Klassart was started by Smári Guðmundsson, older brother of the lead singer, Fríða Dís Guðmundsdóttir. Their older brother Palmar Guðmundsson joined the band in 2009.

In 2006, the band won the Rás 2 blues competition. The John Prine cover "Gamli grafreiturinn" from their 2010 album, Bréf frá París, reached the top of the Icelandic charts.

The band has played in many parts of Iceland, including the Icelandic Blues Festival in Reykjavík on 20 March 2008, and at the Iceland Airwaves in October 2010.

== Discography ==
=== Albums ===
- 2007: Bottle of Blues
- 2010: Bréf frá París
- 2014: Smástirni

=== Singles ===
- 2007: "Bottle of blues"
- 2007: "Painkillers & Beer"
- 2007: "Örlagablús"
- 2010: "Bréf frá París"
- 2010: "Þangað til það tekst"
- 2010: "Gamli grafreiturinn"
- 2013: "Smástirni"
- 2014: "Flugmiði aðra leið"
- 2014: "Landamæri"
