= Albert Guðmundsson =

Albert Guðmundsson may refer to:

- Albert Guðmundsson (footballer, born 1923) (1923–1994), Icelandic football forward and politician
- Albert Guðmundsson (footballer, born 1958), Icelandic football midfielder
- Albert Guðmundsson (footballer, born 1997), Icelandic football winger
