= Gudmundur S. (Bo) Bodvarsson =

Icelandic hydrogeologist

Bo Bodvarsson

Gudmundur Svavar (Bo) Bodvarsson (November 11, 1952 – November 29, 2006) was an Icelandic hydrogeologist who is known for his work with the Yucca Mountain nuclear waste repository. From 1980 until his death, he was affiliated with the Berkeley Lab, serving as the director of its earth science division from 2001. He was also a prolific writer on the subject of hydrology.
