= Erró =

Icelandic artist

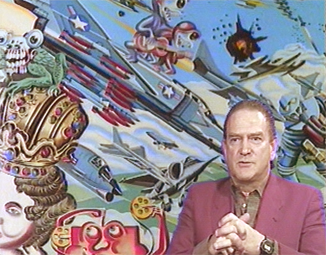
Erró

Erró (born Guðmundur Guðmundsson in 1932 in Ólafsvík, Iceland) is a visual artist and painter, who is best known for his painted pop art collages of images from comic books and advertisements. He lives in France and Spain.

He was previously married to Myriam Bat-Yosef.

== Career ==
Erró studied art in Norway and in Italy, and has resided in Paris, Thailand, and on the island of Formentera for most of his life. In 1989 he donated a large collection of his works to the Reykjavik Arts Museum, which has put part of it on permanent display and opened a website where the whole collection can be visited.

An exhibition of his work, Variations on Animation, was presented by Galérie Louis Carré at Louis Stern Fine Arts in conjunction with the 2003 Los Angeles International Biennial. A major retrospective of his work was held at the Museum of Contemporary Art in Lyon (France) in 2015.

In 2010 he was accused of plagiarism by Brian Bolland for copying his work uncredited and selling it.
