= ERDF =

ERDF may refer to:

- European Regional Development Fund, a fund allocated by the European Union
- Électricité Réseau Distribution France, the operators of some of the electricity distribution system in France
- Environmental Restoration Disposal Facility, at the Hanford Site, US
