= Hanford Site =

Defunct American nuclear production site

Coordinates: 46°38′51″N 119°35′55″W

- Superfund site
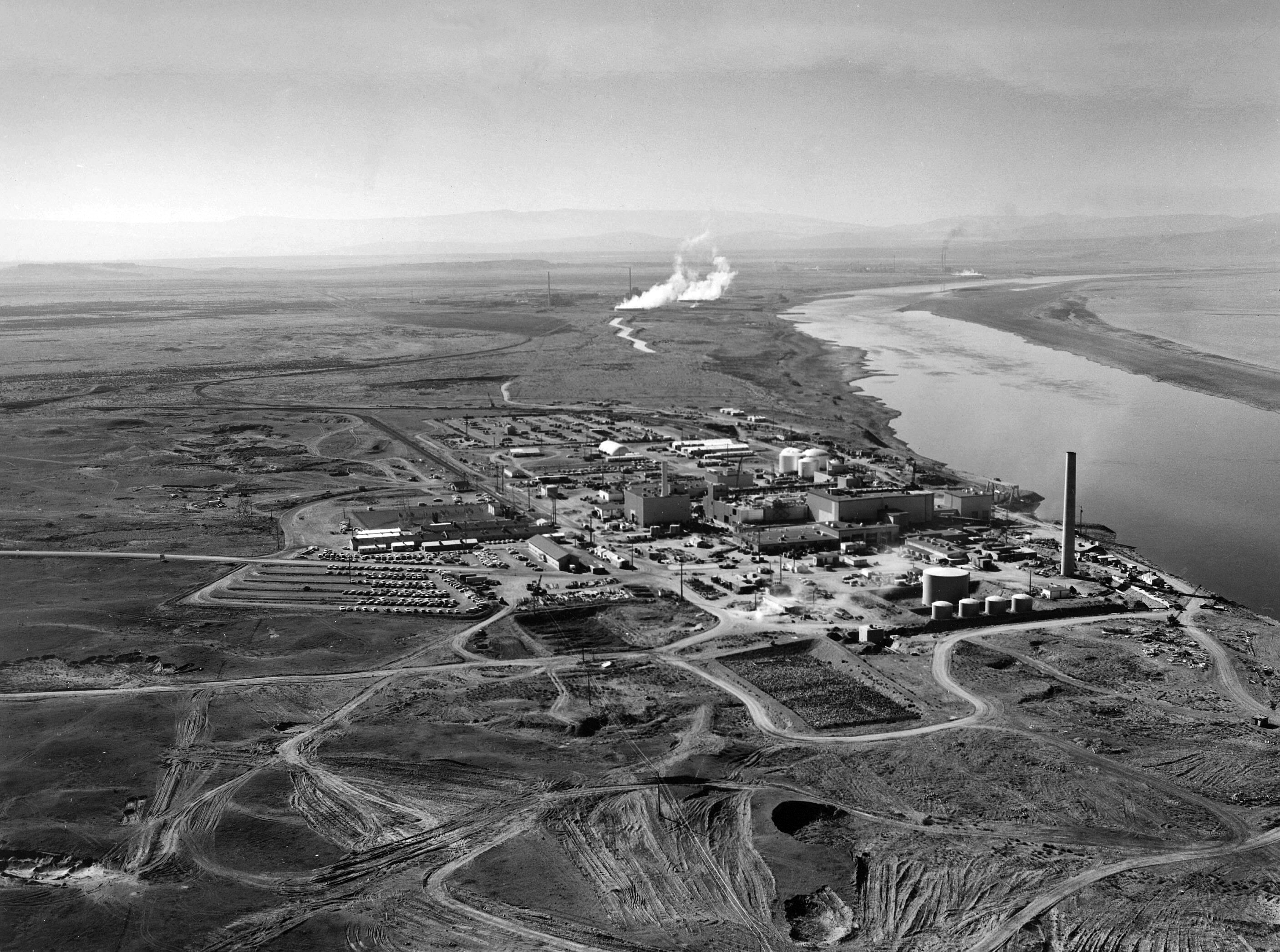
- Nuclear reactors line the riverbank at the Hanford Site along the Columbia River in January 1960. The N Reactor is in the foreground, with the twin KE and KW Reactors in the immediate background. The historic B Reactor, the world's first plutonium production reactor, is visible in the distance.

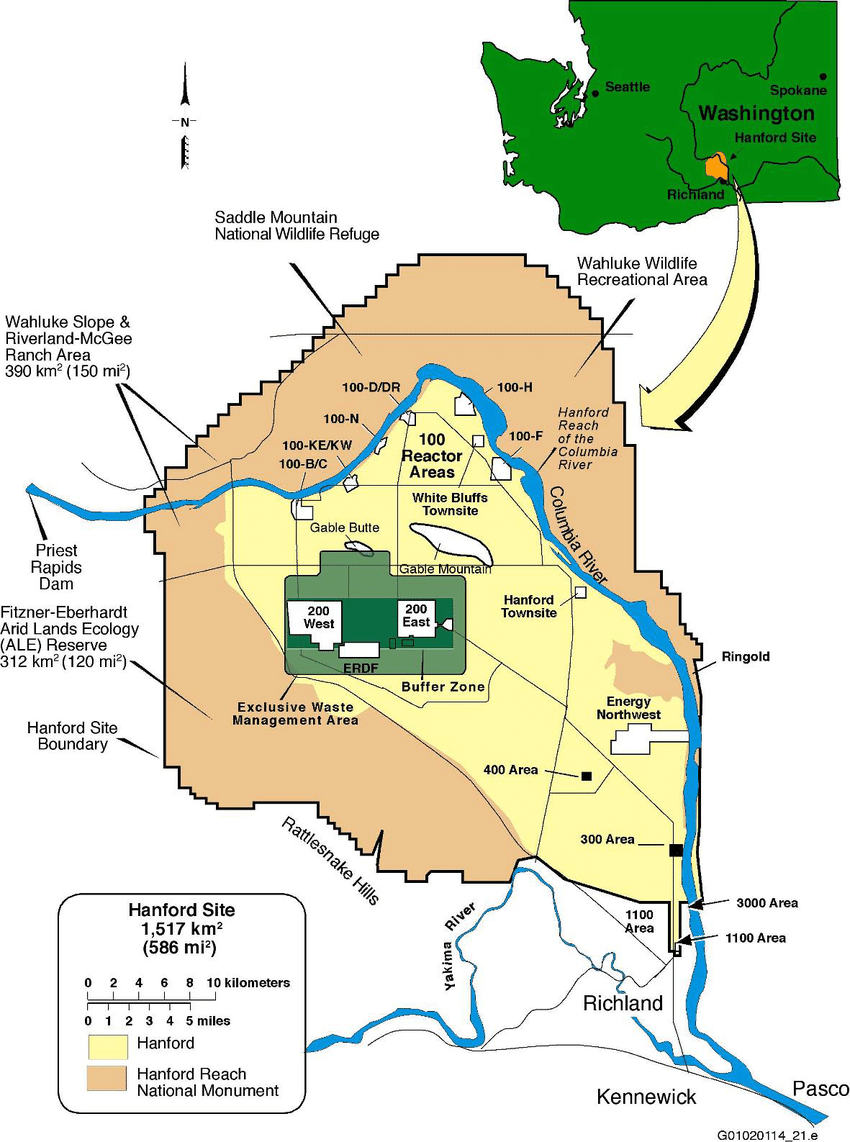
- The main areas of the Hanford Site, as well as the buffer zone that was turned over to the Hanford Reach National Monument in 2000
- Location: Benton, Washington

Information

Progress
- Proposed: June 24, 1988

The Hanford Site is a decommissioned nuclear production complex operated by the United States federal government on the Columbia River in Benton County in the U.S. state of Washington. It has also been known as Site W and the Hanford Nuclear Reservation. Established in 1943 as part of the Manhattan Project, the site was home to the Hanford Engineer Works and B Reactor, the first full-scale plutonium production reactor in the world. Plutonium manufactured at the site was used in the first atomic bomb, which was tested in the Trinity nuclear test, and in the Fat Man bomb used in the bombing of Nagasaki.

During the Cold War, the project expanded to include nine nuclear reactors and five large plutonium processing complexes, which produced plutonium for most of the more than 60,000 weapons built for the U.S. nuclear arsenal. Nuclear technology developed rapidly during this period, and Hanford scientists produced major technological achievements. The town of Richland, established by the Manhattan Project, became self-governing in 1958, and residents were allowed to purchase their properties. After sufficient plutonium had been produced, the production reactors were shut down between 1964 and 1971.

Many early safety procedures and waste disposal practices were inadequate, resulting in the release of significant amounts of radioactive materials into the air and the Columbia River, resulting in higher rates of cancer in the surrounding area. The Hanford Site became the focus of the nation's largest environmental cleanup. A citizen-led Hanford Advisory Board provides recommendations from community stakeholders, including local and state governments, regional environmental organizations, business interests, and Native American tribes. Cleanup activity is still ongoing, with over 10,000 workers employed on cleanup activities.

Hanford hosts a commercial nuclear power plant, the Columbia Generating Station, and various centers for scientific research and development, such as the Pacific Northwest National Laboratory, the Fast Flux Test Facility, and the LIGO Hanford Observatory. In 2015, it was designated as part of the Manhattan Project National Historical Park. Tourists can visit the site and B Reactor.

== Geography ==
The Hanford Site occupies 586 square miles (1,518 km^{2}) – roughly equivalent to half the total area of Rhode Island – within Benton County, Washington. It is a desert environment receiving less than ten inches (250 mm) of annual precipitation, covered mostly by shrub-steppe vegetation. The Columbia River flows along the site for approximately 50 miles (80 km), forming its northern and eastern boundary. The Columbia and Yakima Rivers contain salmon, sturgeon, steelhead trout, and bass, and wildlife in the area includes skunks, muskrats, coyotes, raccoons, deer, eagles, hawks, and owls. The mountain cottontail is particularly abundant. The flora includes sagebrush, bitterbrush, a variety of grasses, prickly pear, and willow.

The original site was 670 square miles (1,740 km^{2}) and included buffer areas across the river in Grant and Franklin counties. Some of this land has been returned to private use and is now covered with orchards, vineyards, and irrigated fields. The site is bordered on the southeast by the Tri‑Cities, a metropolitan area composed of Richland, Kennewick, Pasco, and smaller communities, and home to nearly 300,000 residents. Hanford is a primary economic base for these cities. In 2000 large portions of the original site were turned over to the Hanford Reach National Monument. The remainder was divided by function into three main areas: the nuclear reactors were located along the river in an area designated as the 100 Area; the chemical separation complexes were located inland in the Central Plateau, designated as the 200 Area; and support facilities were located in the southeast corner of the site, designated as the 300 Area.

== Climate ==
Climate data for Hanford Site, Washington
Month	Jan	Feb	Mar	Apr	May	Jun	Jul	Aug	Sep	Oct	Nov	Dec	Year
Record high °F (°C)	72 (22)	72 (22)	83 (28)	94 (34)	104 (40)	120 (49)	113 (45)	113 (45)	106 (41)	93 (34)	76 (24)	71 (22)	120 (49)
Mean daily maximum °F (°C)	40.0 (4.4)	47.9 (8.8)	58.1 (14.5)	66.9 (19.4)	76.9 (24.9)	84.0 (28.9)	93.6 (34.2)	92.2 (33.4)	81.8 (27.7)	65.9 (18.8)	49.2 (9.6)	39.8 (4.3)	66.4 (19.1)
Mean daily minimum °F (°C)	26.5 (−3.1)	28.9 (−1.7)	34.5 (1.4)	40.5 (4.7)	48.9 (9.4)	55.6 (13.1)	62.5 (16.9)	60.8 (16.0)	52.2 (11.2)	41.2 (5.1)	31.6 (−0.2)	26.0 (−3.3)	42.4 (5.8)
Record low °F (°C)	−22 (−30)	−23 (−31)	5 (−15)	21 (−6)	28 (−2)	37 (3)	39 (4)	41 (5)	30 (−1)	7 (−14)	−13 (−25)	−14 (−26)	−23 (−31)
Average precipitation inches (mm)	0.94 (24)	0.64 (16)	0.51 (13)	0.47 (12)	0.55 (14)	0.53 (13)	0.18 (4.6)	0.25 (6.4)	0.30 (7.6)	0.57 (14)	0.85 (22)	0.99 (25)	6.76 (172)
Source: Averages for 1991–2020, Extremes for 1945–2021

Hanford is the site of Washington state's highest recorded temperature of 120 °F (48.9 °C), reached on June 29, 2021.

== Early history ==
The confluence of the Yakima, Snake, and Columbia rivers has been a meeting place for native peoples for centuries. The archaeological record of Native American habitation of this area stretches back over ten thousand years. Tribes and nations including the Yakama, Nez Perce, and Umatilla used the area for hunting, fishing, and gathering plant foods. Archaeologists have identified numerous Native American sites, including "pit house villages, open campsites, fish farming sites, hunting/kill sites, game drive complexes, quarries, and spirit quest sites", and two archaeological sites were listed on the National Register of Historic Places in 1976.

In 1855, Isaac Stevens, the governor of the Territory of Washington, negotiated with the Native American tribes to establish a reservation system, in which Native Americans could not occupy the area of the Hanford Site. Treaties were signed, but were often ignored, as the reservation system they mandated was not compatible with traditional food-gathering or family groupings. In September 1858 a military expedition under Colonel George Wright defeated the Native American tribes in the Battle of Spokane Plains to force compliance with the reservation system. Nonetheless, Native American use of the area continued into the 20th century. The Wanapum people were never forced onto a reservation, and they lived along the Columbia River in the Priest Rapids Valley until 1943.

After gold was discovered in British Columbia, prospectors explored the Columbia River basin in search of gold, but with little success. Walla Walla, which had been established as a military post in 1858, became a center for mining supplies, and a general store was established at White Bluffs. A ranch was established in Yakima Valley by Ben Snipes in 1859, and the Northern Pacific Railroad was extended into the area beginning in 1879. The railroad engineers founded the towns of Kennewick and Pasco. Settlers moved into the region, initially along the Columbia River south of Priest Rapids. They established farms and orchards supported by small-scale irrigation projects, but most went bankrupt in the Panic of 1893. The Reclamation Act of 1902 provided for federal government participation in the financing of irrigation projects, and the population began expanding again, with small town centers at Hanford, White Bluffs and Richland established between 1905 and 1910. The Great Depression of the 1930s decreased the price of agricultural commodities and many farms were foreclosed on or abandoned. The economy was supported by the construction of the Grand Coulee Dam between 1933 and 1942, and the establishment of the Naval Air Station Pasco in 1942.

== Manhattan Project ==
=== Background ===
During World War II, the S-1 Section of the federal Office of Scientific Research and Development (OSRD) sponsored a research project on plutonium. Research was conducted by scientists at the University of Chicago Metallurgical Laboratory. At the time, plutonium was a rare element that had only recently been synthesized in laboratories. It was theorized that plutonium was fissile and could be used in an atomic bomb. The United States government was concerned that Nazi Germany was developing a nuclear weapons program. The Metallurgical Laboratory physicists worked on designing nuclear reactors ("piles") that could irradiate uranium and transmute it into plutonium. Meanwhile, chemists investigated ways to separate plutonium from uranium.

=== DuPont appointment ===
In September 1942, Brigadier General Leslie R. Groves Jr. became the director of the Manhattan Project, as it came to be known. The project to build industrial-size plants for the manufacture of plutonium was codenamed the X‑10 project. Groves engaged DuPont, a firm he had worked with in the past on the construction of explosives plants, to design, construct, and operate the plutonium manufacturing complex.

To avoid being labeled as merchants of death, as the company had been after World War I, DuPont's executive committee insisted that it should receive no payment. For legal reasons, a Cost Plus Fixed Fee contract was agreed, with a fee of one dollar. The president of DuPont, Walter S. Carpenter Jr., was given assurances that the government was assuming all responsibility for the hazards involved in the project.

=== Site selection ===
Carpenter expressed reservations about building the reactors at Oak Ridge, Tennessee; with Knoxville only 20 miles (32 km) away, a catastrophic accident might result in loss of life and severe health effects. Even a less deadly accident might disrupt vital war production, particularly of aluminum, and force the evacuation of the Manhattan Project's isotope separation plants. Spreading the facilities at Oak Ridge out more would require the purchase of more land and the expansion needed was still uncertain; for planning purposes, six reactors, and four chemical separation plants were envisioned.

The ideal site was described by eight criteria:

1. A clean and abundant water supply (at least 25,000 US gallons per minute (1,600 L/s))
2. A large electric power supply (about 100,000 kW)
3. A "hazardous manufacturing area" of at least 12 by 16 miles (19 by 26 km)
4. Space for laboratory facilities at least 8 miles (13 km) from the nearest reactor or separations plant
5. The employees' village no less than 10 miles (16 km) upwind of the plant
6. No towns of more than a thousand people closer than 20 miles (32 km) from the hazardous rectangle
7. No main highway, railway, or employee village closer than 10 miles (16 km) from the hazardous rectangle
8. Ground that could bear heavy loads

The most important of these criteria was the availability of electric power. The needs of war industries had created power shortages in many parts of the country, and use of the Tennessee Valley Authority (TVA) was ruled out because the Clinton Engineer Works was expected to use up all its surplus power. This led to consideration of alternative sites in the Pacific Northwest and Southwest, where there was surplus electrical power. Between December 18 and 31, 1942, just twelve days after the Metallurgical Laboratory team led by Enrico Fermi started up Chicago Pile 1, the first nuclear reactor, a three-man party consisting of Colonel Franklin T. Matthias and DuPont engineers A. E. S. Hall and Gilbert P. Church inspected the most promising potential sites. Matthias reported to Groves that the Hanford Site was "far more favorable in virtually all respects than any other"; the survey party was particularly impressed by the fact that a high-voltage power line from Grand Coulee Dam to Bonneville Dam ran through the site, and there was an electrical substation on its edge. Groves visited the site on January 16, 1943, and approved the selection. The facility became known as the Hanford Engineer Works (HEW), and the site was codenamed Site W.

=== Land acquisition ===
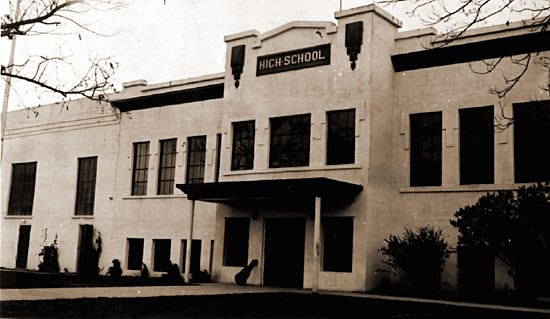
Hanford High School before residents were displaced by the creation of the Hanford Site

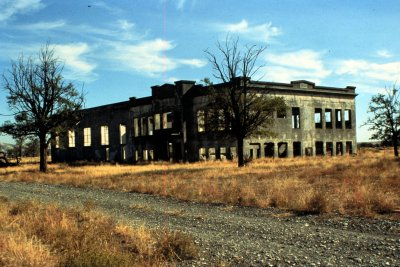
Hanford High School after abandonment

The Secretary of War, Henry L. Stimson, authorized the acquisition of the land on February 8, 1943. A Manhattan District project office opened in Prosser, Washington, on February 22, and the Washington Title Insurance Company opened an office there to furnish title certificates. Federal Judge Lewis B. Schwellenbach issued an order of possession under the Second War Powers Act the following day, and the first tract was acquired on March 10. Some 4,218 tracts totaling 428,203.95 acres (173,287.99 ha) were to be acquired, making it one of the largest land acquisition projects in American history.

Most of the land (some 88 percent) was sagebrush, where eighteen to twenty thousand sheep grazed. About eleven percent was farmland, although not all was under cultivation. Farmers felt that they should be compensated for the value of the crops they had planted as well as for the land itself. Because construction plans had not yet been drawn up, and work on the site could not immediately commence, Groves decided to postpone the taking of the physical possession of properties under cultivation to allow farmers to harvest the crops they had already planted. This reduced the hardship on the farmers, and avoided the wasting of food at a time when the nation was facing food shortages and the federal government was urging citizens to plant victory gardens. The War Department arranged with Federal Prison Industries for crops to be harvested by prisoners from the McNeil Island Penitentiary.

The harvest in the spring and summer of 1943 was exceptionally good, and high crop prices due to the war greatly increased land values. Litigation was needed to resolve disputes over the compensation due to the sellers. Discontent over the acquisition was apparent in letters sent from Hanford Site residents to the War and Justice Departments, and the Truman Committee began making inquiries. Stimson met with chairman of the committee, Senator Harry S. Truman, who agreed to remove the Hanford Site from the committee's investigations on the grounds of national security. Trial juries were sympathetic to the claims of the landowners and the payments awarded were well in excess of the government appraisals. When the Manhattan Project ended on December 31, 1946, there were still 237 tracts remaining to be settled.

About 1,500 residents of Hanford, White Bluffs, and nearby settlements were relocated, as well as the Wanapum people, Confederated Tribes and Bands of the Yakima Nation, the Confederated Tribes of the Umatilla Indian Reservation, and the Nez Perce Tribe.

Native Americans were accustomed to fishing in the Columbia River near White Bluffs for two or three weeks in October. The fish they caught were dried and provided food for the winter. The Natives rejected offers of an annual cash payment, and a deal was struck allowing the chief and his two assistants to issue passes to fish at the site. This authority was later revoked for security reasons. Matthias gave assurances that Native American graves would be treated with respect, but it would be fifteen years before the Wanapum people were allowed access to mark the cemeteries. In 1997, the elders were permitted to bring children and young adults onto the site once a year to learn about their sacred sites.

=== Construction workforce ===
DuPont advertised for workers in newspapers for an unspecified "war construction project" in southeastern Washington, offering an "attractive scale of wages" and living facilities. Normally for a development in such an isolated area, employees would be accommodated on site, but in this case for security and safety reasons it was desirable to locate them at least 10 miles (16 km) away. Even the construction workforce could not be housed on site, because some plant operations would have to be carried out during start-up testing. The Army and DuPont engineers decided to create two communities: a temporary constructions camp and a more substantial operating village. Construction was expedited by locating them on the sites of existing villages to take advantage of the buildings, roads and utility infrastructure already in place. They established the construction camp on the site of the village of Hanford, and the operating village on that of Richland.

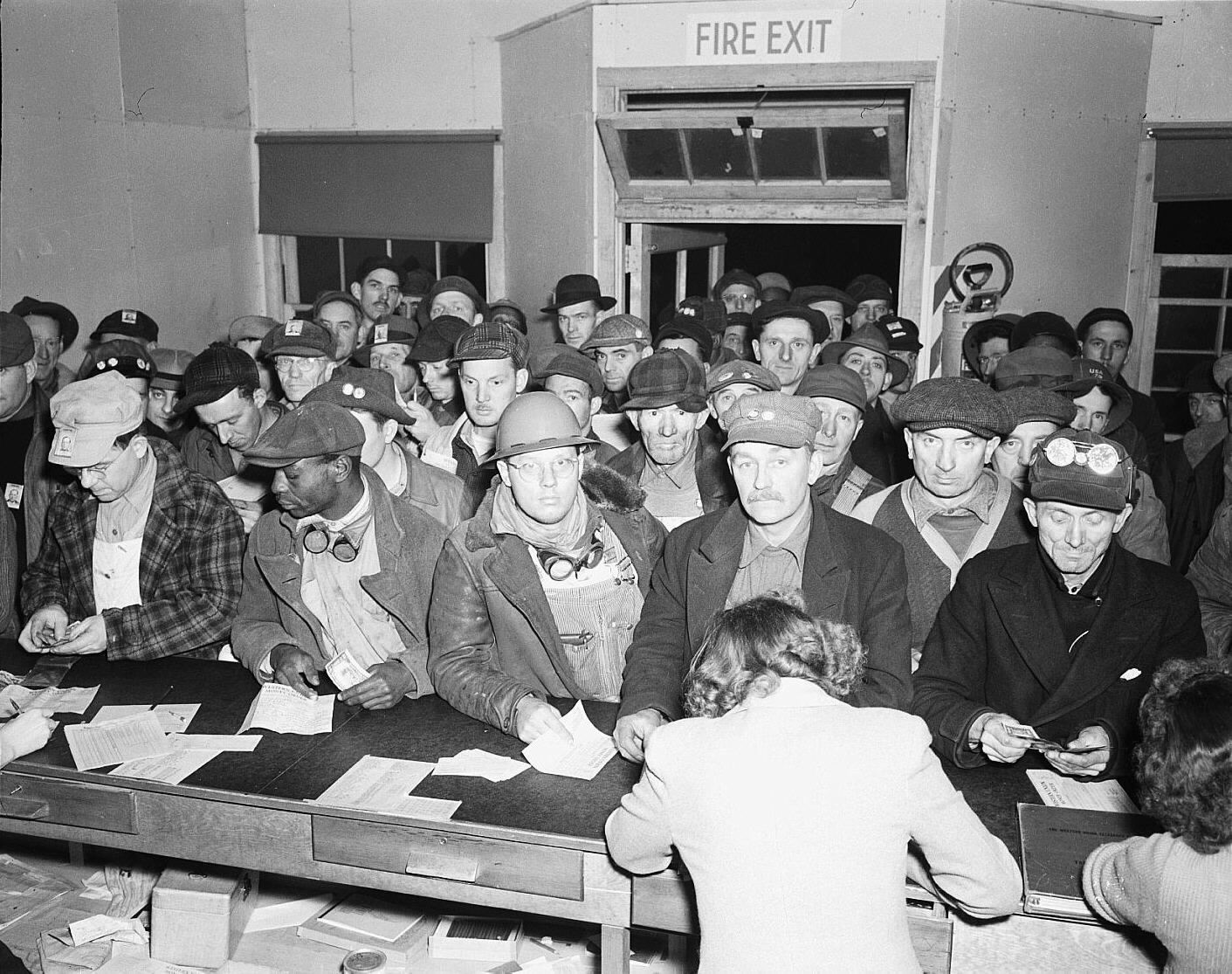
Hanford workers line up for paychecks.

The construction workforce peaked at 45,096 on June 21, 1944. About thirteen percent were women, and non-whites made up 16.45 percent. African-Americans lived in segregated quarters, had their own messes and recreation areas, and were paid less than white workers. Three types of accommodation were provided at Hanford: barracks, hutments and trailer parking. The first workers to arrive lived in tents while they erected the first barracks. Barracks construction commenced on April 6, 1943, and eventually 195 barracks were erected: 110 for white men, 21 for black men, 57 for white women, and seven for black women. Hutments were prefabricated plywood and Celotex dwellings capable of accommodating ten to twenty workers each. Between them, the barracks and hutments held 39,050 workers. Many workers had their own trailers, taking their families with them from one wartime construction job to the next. Seven trailer camps were established, and at the peak of construction work 12,008 people were living in them.

DuPont put the contract for building the village of Richland out to tender, and the contract was awarded to the lowest bidder, G. Albin Pehrson, on March 16, 1943. Pehrson produced a series of standard house designs based on the Cape Cod and ranch-style house design fashions of the day. Pehrson accepted the need for speed and efficiency, but his vision of a model late-20th-century community differed from the austere concept of Groves. Pehrson ultimately had his way on most issues, because he worked for DuPont, not the Army. The resulting compromise would handicap Richland for many years with inadequate sidewalks, stores, and shops, no civic center, and roads that were too narrow. Unlike Oak Ridge and Los Alamos, Richland was not surrounded by a high wire fence, thus Matthias asked DuPont to ensure that it was kept neat and tidy.

=== Construction ===
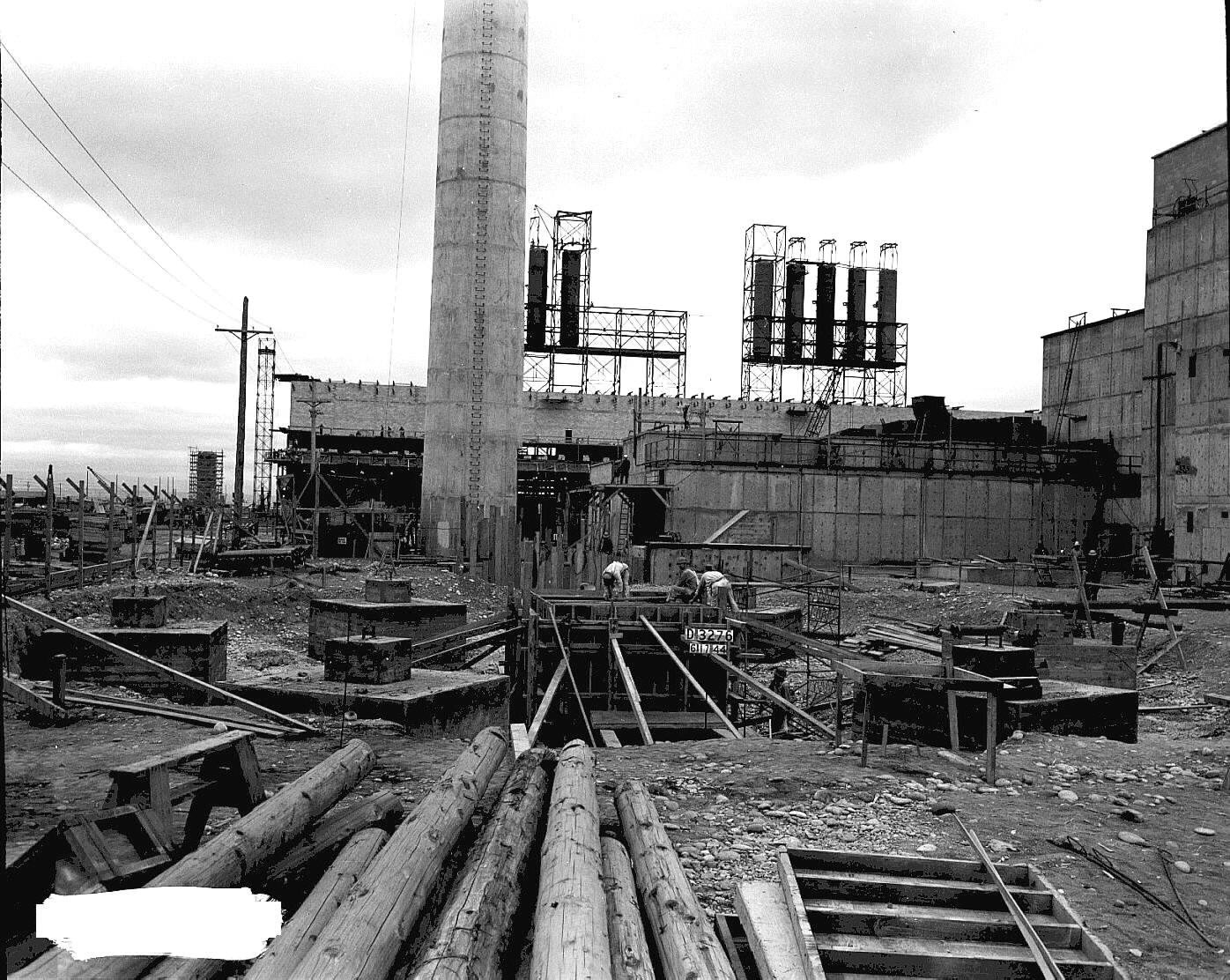
B Reactor construction (1944)

Construction of the nuclear facilities proceeded rapidly. Before the end of the war in August 1945, the HEW built 554 buildings at Hanford, including three nuclear reactors (105‑B, 105‑D, and 105‑F) and three plutonium processing plants (221‑T, 221‑B, and 221‑U). The project required 386 miles (621 km) of roads, 158 miles (254 km) of railway, and four electrical substations. The HEW used 780,000 cubic yards (600,000 m^{3}) of concrete and 40,000 short tons (36,000 t) of structural steel.

Construction on B Reactor commenced in August 1943 and was completed on September 13, 1944. The reactor went critical in late September and, after overcoming neutron poisoning, produced its first plutonium on November 6, 1944. The reactors were graphite moderated and water cooled. They consisted of a 28-by-36-foot (8.5 by 11.0 m), 1,200-short-ton (1,100 t) graphite cylinder lying on its side, penetrated horizontally through its entire length by 2,004 aluminum tubes containing 200 short tons (180 t) of uranium slugs. They had no moving parts; the only sounds were those of the water pumps. Cooling water was pumped through the tubes at the rate of 30,000 US gallons per minute (1,900 L/s). This was enough water for a city of a million people.

=== Production process ===
Uranium arrived at the Hanford Engineer Works in the form of billets. In the Metal Fabrication and Testing (300) Area they were extruded into rods and machined into cylindrical pieces, 1.569 inches (3.99 cm) in diameter and 8 inches (20 cm) long, known as "slugs". The initial charge of the three reactors required more than twenty thousand billets, and another two thousand were needed each month. Uranium is highly reactive with water, so to protect the slugs from corrosion by the cooling water they were canned in aluminum after being dipped into a molten bath of copper–tin alloy, and the cap was arc welded on. A defective can could burst and jam in the reactor, stop the flow of cooling water, and force a complete shutdown of the reactor, so the canning process had to be precise.

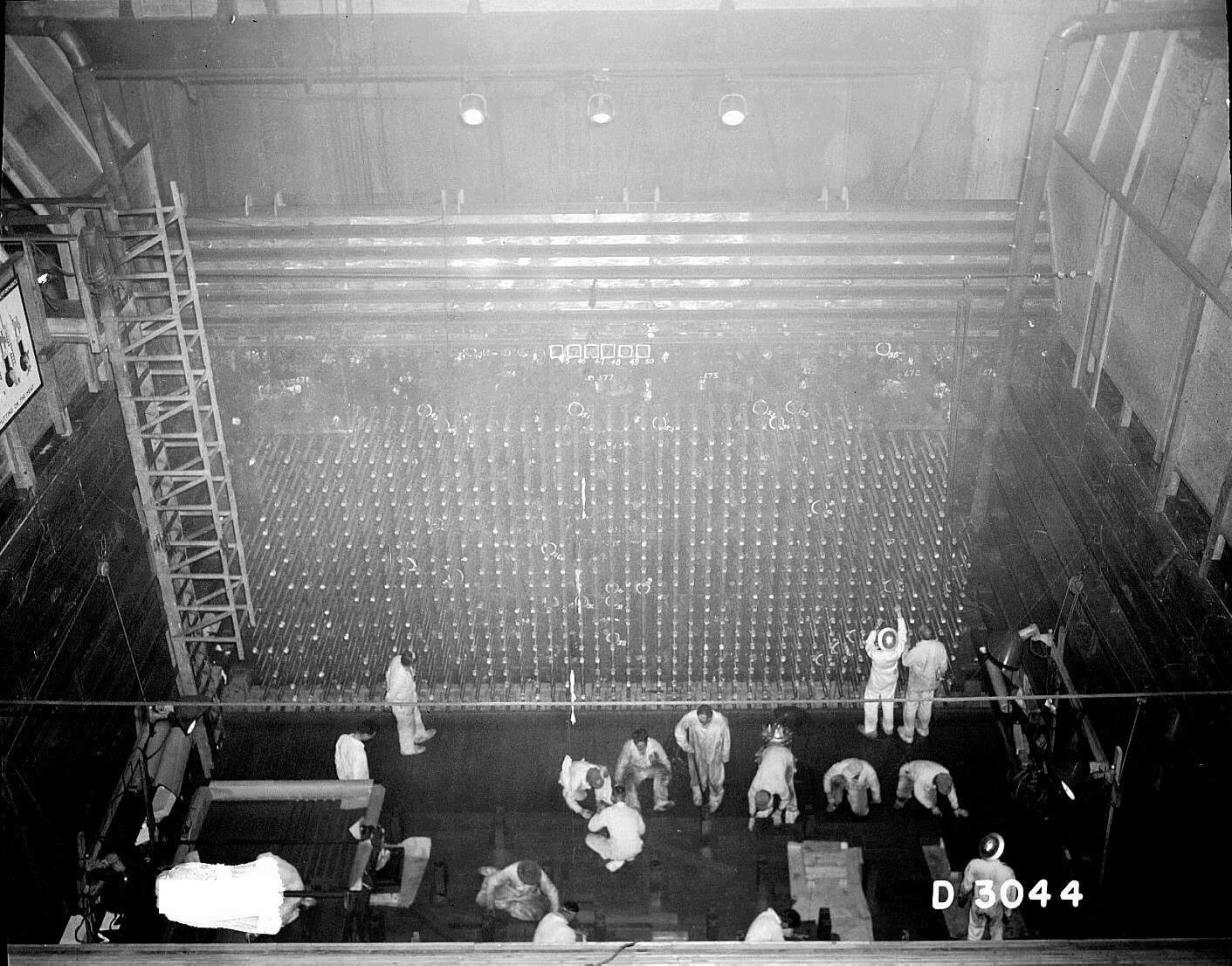
Workers lay the graphite neutron moderator of B Reactor during construction.

Irradiated fuel slugs were transported by rail on a special railroad car operated by remote control to huge remotely-operated chemical separation plants about 10 miles (16 km) away. The separation buildings were massive windowless concrete structures, 800 feet (240 m) long, 80 feet (24 m) high and 65 feet (20 m) wide, with concrete walls 3 to 5 feet (0.91 to 1.52 m) thick. Inside the buildings were canyons and galleries where a series of chemical processing steps separated the small amount of plutonium from the remaining uranium and fission products.

Items were moved about with a 60-foot (18 m) long overhead crane. Once they began processing irradiated slugs, the machinery became so radioactive that it would be unsafe for humans ever to come in contact with it, so the engineers devised methods to allow for the replacement of components via remote control. Periscopes and closed-circuit television gave the operator a view of the process. They assembled the equipment by remote control as if the area was already radioactive. To receive the radioactive wastes from the chemical separations process, there were "tank farms" consisting of 64 single-shell underground waste tanks.

The first batch of plutonium was refined in the 221‑T plant from December 26, 1944, to February 2, 1945, and delivered to the Los Alamos Laboratory in New Mexico on February 5, 1945. Two identical reactors, D Reactor and F Reactor, came online on December 5, 1944, and February 15, 1945, respectively, and all three reactors were running at full power (250 megawatts) by March 8, 1945. By April kilogram-quantity shipments of plutonium were headed to Los Alamos. Road convoys replaced the trains in May, and in late July shipments began being dispatched by air from the airport at Hanford.

=== Production activities ===
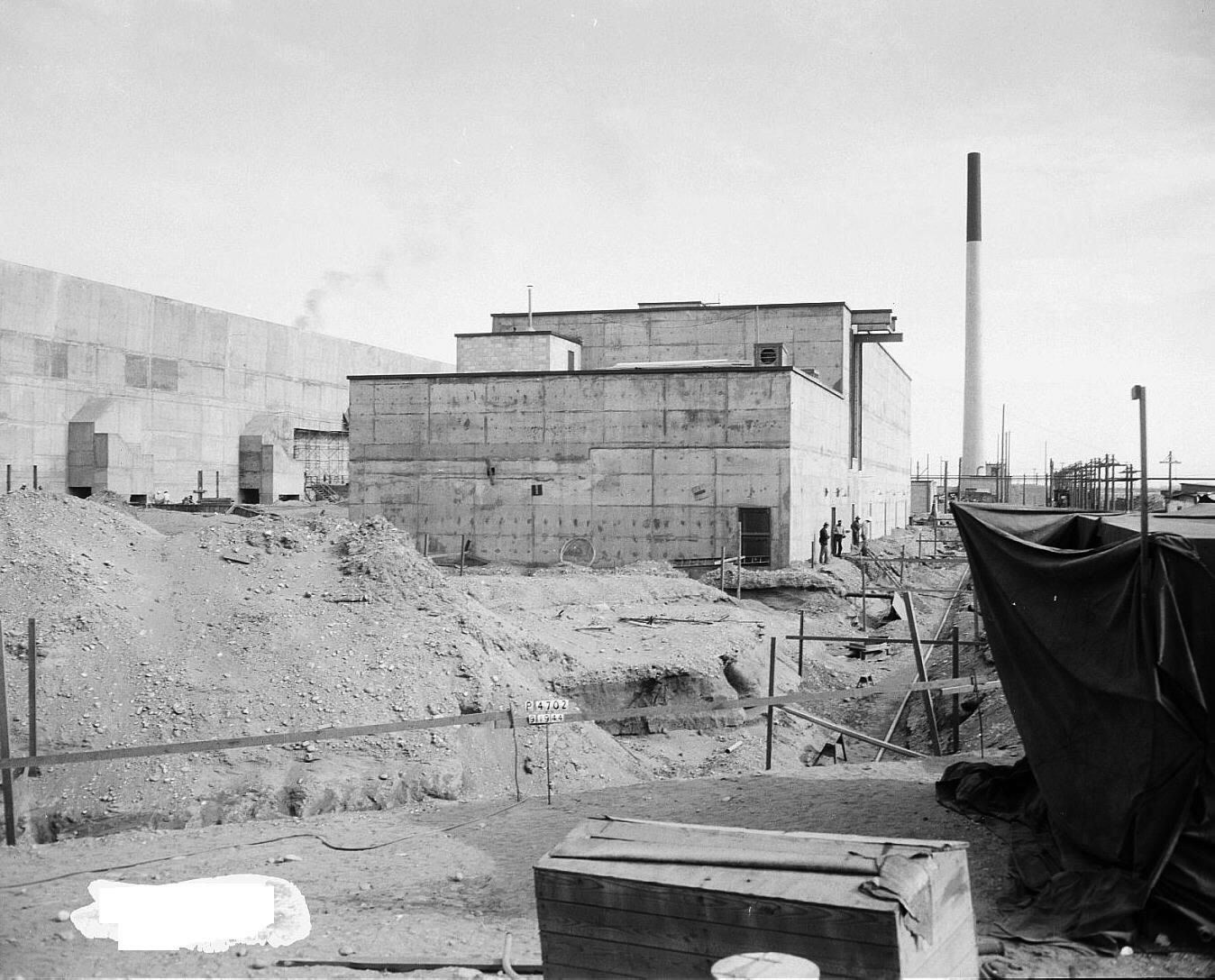
The 224-T plant under construction, showing the transfer pipes

Although the reactors could be shut down in two-and-a-half seconds, they would still generate heat due to the decay of fission products. It was therefore vital that the flow of water should not cease. If the power failed, the steam pumps would automatically cut in and continue to deliver water at full capacity for long enough to allow an orderly shutdown. This occurred on March 10, 1945, when a Japanese balloon bomb struck a high-tension line between Grand Coulee and Bonneville. This caused an electrical surge in the lines to the reactors. A scram was automatically initiated and the safety devices shut the reactors down. The bomb failed to explode and the transmission line was not badly damaged. The Hanford Engineer Works was the only U.S. nuclear facility to come under enemy attack.

Hanford provided the plutonium for the bomb used in the 1945 Trinity nuclear test. Throughout this period, the Manhattan Project maintained a top-secret classification. Fewer than one percent of Hanford's workers knew they were working on a nuclear weapons project. Groves noted in his memoirs that "We made certain that each member of the project thoroughly understood his part in the total effort; that, and nothing more." The existence and purpose of Hanford was publicly revealed through press releases on August 7 and 9, 1945, after the bombing of Hiroshima but before Hanford plutonium was used (in a Fat Man) during the bombing of Nagasaki on August 9.

Matthias was succeeded as area engineer by Colonel Frederick J. Clarke in January 1946. DuPont would soon be gone too. Carpenter asked to be released from the contract. Groves informed Robert P. Patterson, who had succeeded Stimson as Secretary of War on September 21, 1945, Groves's choice of replacement was General Electric (GE), which took over operations at Hanford on September 1, 1946, and accepted a formal control on September 30. On December 31, 1946, the Manhattan Project ended and control of the Hanford Site passed to the Atomic Energy Commission (AEC). The total cost of the Hanford Engineer Works up to that time was $348,101,240 (equivalent to $5.747234637×10^{9} in 2025).

== Cold War ==
=== Production problems ===
GE inherited serious problems. Running the reactors continuously at full power had resulted in the Wigner effect, swelling of the graphite due to the displacement of the atoms in its crystalline structure by collisions with neutrons. This had the potential to buckle the aluminum tubes used for the fuel and control rods and disable the reactors completely if a water pipe ruptured. The polonium-210 used in the Fat Man's neutron initiators had a half-life of only 138 days, so it was essential to keep a reactor running or the weapons would be rendered inoperative. The Army therefore shut down B Reactor on March 19. In August 1946, Franklin was informed that irradiating the feed to produce over 200 grams of plutonium per metric ton of uranium was resulting in too much undesirable plutonium-240 in the product. The power level on D and F Reactors was reduced, which also extended their useful life. Some experiments were conducted with annealing the graphite. It was found in laboratory testing of samples that heating to 400 °C (752 °F) retired the graphite by 24 percent, to 600 °C (1,112 °F) by 45 percent and to 1,000 °C (1,830 °F) by 94 percent, but the consequences of heating the reactors so much had to be considered before this was attempted.

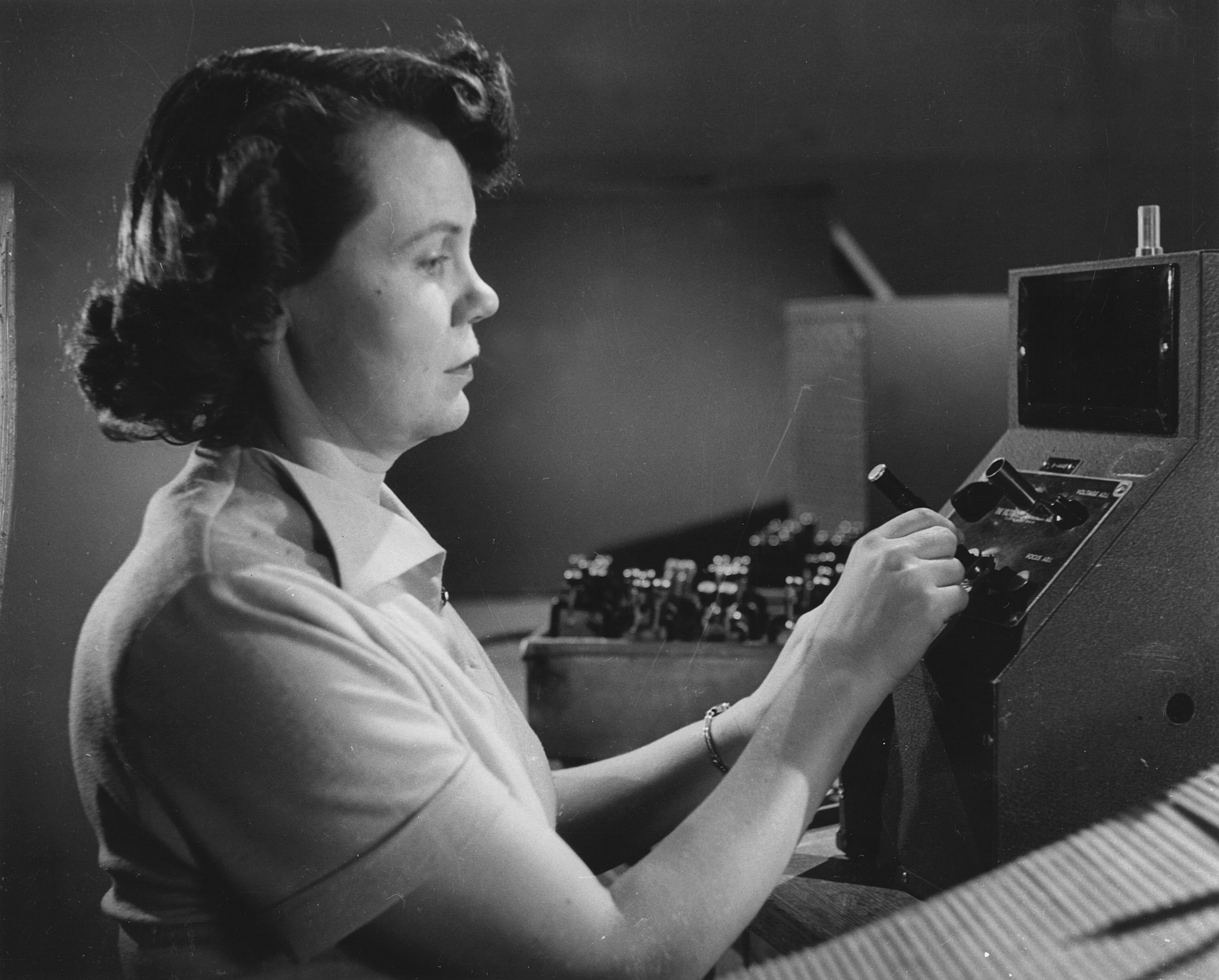
As part of regular health physics procedures, a laboratory assistant checks a pocket ionization chamber at a minometer.

The other problem was that the bismuth phosphate process used to separate the plutonium left the uranium in an unrecoverable state. The Metallurgical Laboratory had researched a promising new redox separation process, using hexone as a solvent. The AEC was concerned about the supply of uranium, and the General Advisory Committee of the AEC recommended that construction of a redox plant be given top priority.

Meanwhile, the waste-settling tanks filled up with sludge, and attempts to transport it to the waste storage (241) areas were unsuccessful. It was therefore decided to bypass the waste settling tanks and send sludge directly to the 200 area, and construction of a bypass commenced in August 1946. GE invited bids for the construction of a new waste storage tank farm. Efforts were made to make better use of the available uranium. Turnings, cuttings, and shavings from the slug manufacture process had been sent to the Ames Laboratory in Iowa for briquetting. The equipment there was shipped to the Hanford Engineer Works. The briquettes, along with uranium scrap metal, was sent to the Metal Hydrides Company for recasting into billets.

During 1947, tensions with the Soviet Union escalated as the Cold War set in. Clarke was succeeded by Carleton Shugg on September 2. Within days of arrival he demanded overtime be used to speed up construction work then in progress. The size of the nuclear stockpile was limited by plutonium production. There was enough for thirteen bombs at the end of 1947. Walter J. Williams, the AEC's director of production, worked with GE engineers to produce plans for three replacement reactors (called BR, DR, and FR). To save time and money, they would be built adjacent to the existing reactors, where they would be able to use their cooling water and separation facilities. Two more reactors would then be built on new sites.

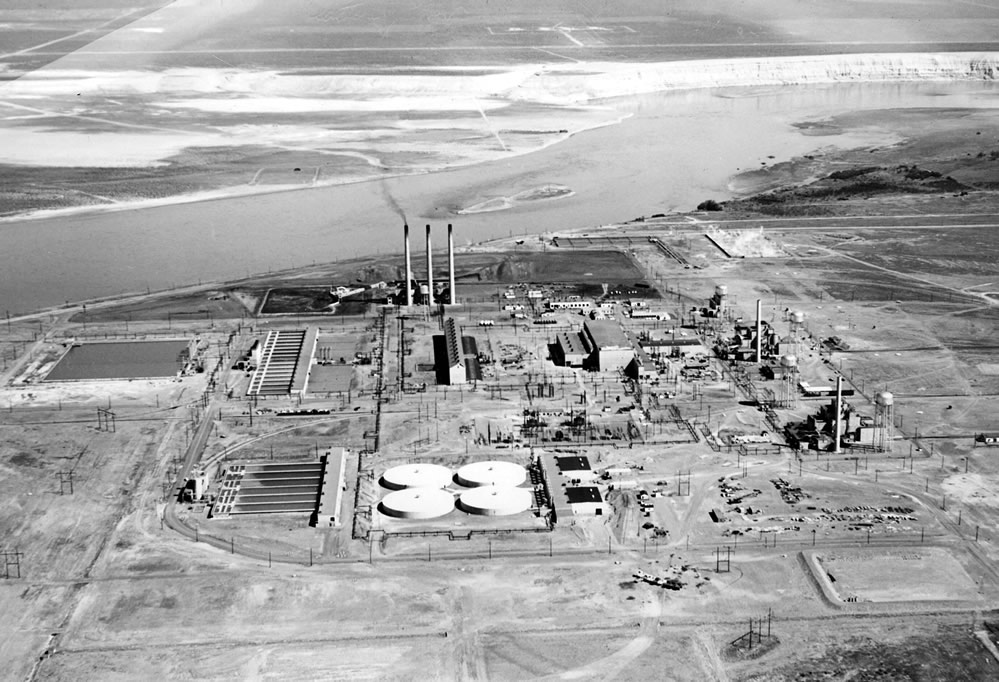
Hanford D and DR Reactors

While this was being considered by the AEC, GE experimented with annealing, and found that if the reactors were run at 299 °C (570 °F) and then slowly cooled, the graphite's crystalline structure could be restored. The reactors could be run at higher temperatures by increasing the power level. Some helium in the atmosphere surrounding the reactors was replaced with carbon dioxide, which conducted heat less efficiently. This allowed more heat to build up in the graphite. To reduce the incidence of cans jamming, their size was reduced from 8 to 4 inches (20 to 10 cm). More plutonium was produced by keeping the fuel elements in the reactor longer. Instead of pushing the entire tube out, half of it was, allowing elements to spend time in parts of the reactor where the neutron flux was less dense. The old reactors could now be run much longer. In December, the AEC approved a scaled-back construction plan, with only one replacement reactor, at site D (called DR), and one reactor at a new site (called H). The new reactors used the same designs as the wartime ones, although they had more pure graphite to allow them to be run at higher power levels, and smaller graphite blocks surrounding the process tubes to restrict expansion.

=== Growth of Richland ===
The population of Richland had already begun to increase again. In 1946 the Hanford Site had 4,479 operating employees and 141 construction workers. Two years later this had increased to 8,628 operating employees and 14,671 construction workers. Richland grew from 14,000 people in 1947 to 22,000 in 1950. To house the construction workers, a new construction camp was established called North Richland, which had a peak population of 13,000 in 1948. Many operating employees and construction workers also lived in Kennewick and Pasco. Shugg arranged for barracks to be brought by barge down the Columbia River from the old Naval Air Station Pasco. About 3,850 houses remained from the war; these were augmented by 800 houses and 64 apartments in 1947, and another 1,000 houses and apartments in 1948. Although the population stabilized, a housing shortage persisted into the 1950s. GE closed down the last of the dormitories in 1958. Richland had a newspaper, the Richland Villager, and every resident received a free copy. Commercial concession holders were pressured to buy advertising space. The villagers paid low rents for their houses, and Village Services was available to help with unpacking, laying carpets or babysitting.

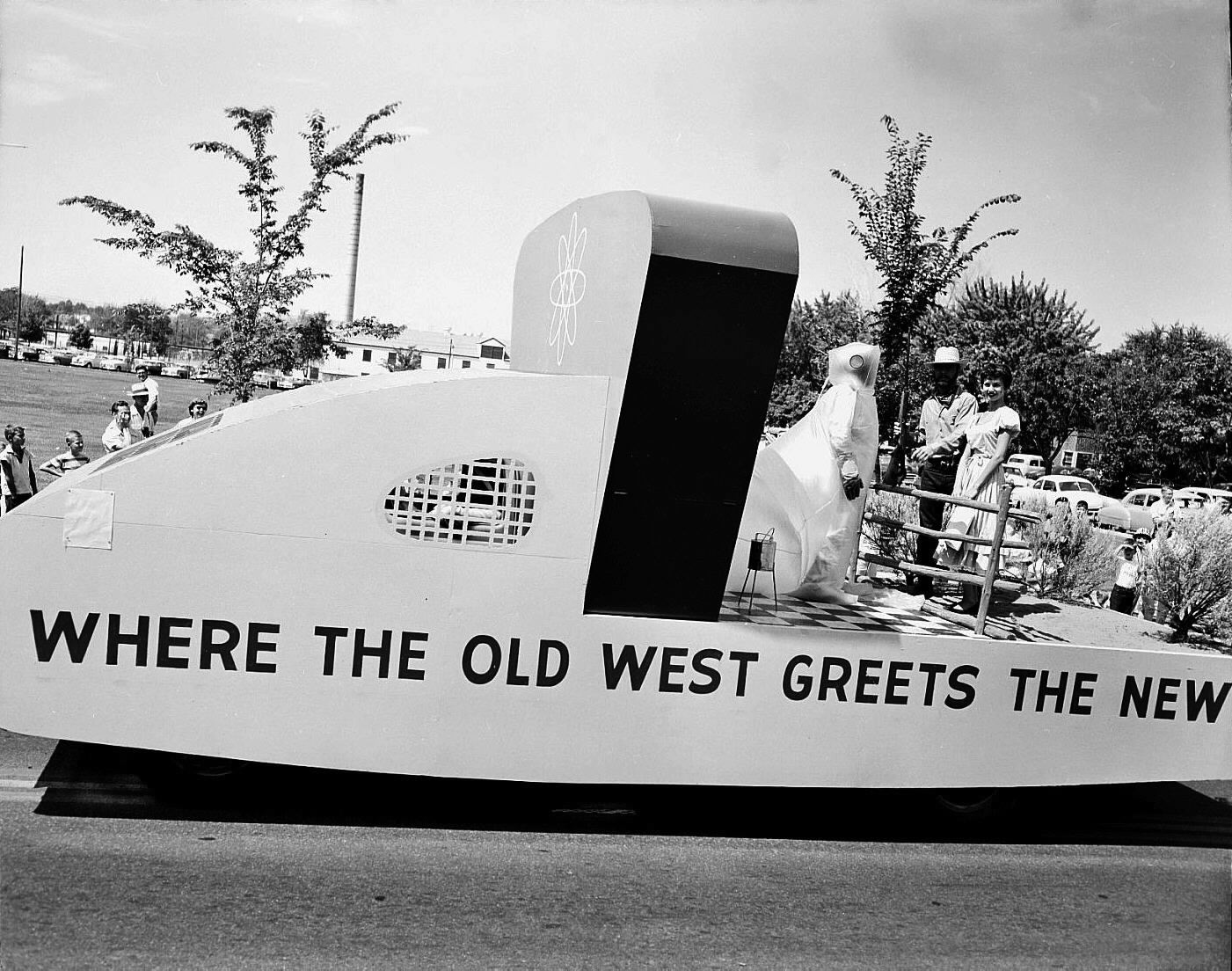
"Atomic Frontier Days" parade in Richland in 1954. The townfolk of Richland appropriated the image of the pioneer.

The adult population of Richland had an average education of 12.5 years, and 40 percent of the men had attended college, compared with 22 percent in the state of Washington as a whole, and the median annual family income in 1959 was $8,368 (equivalent to $92,421 in 2025) compared with $6,225 (equivalent to $68,752 in 2025). In 1950 26 percent of American families had an annual income of less than the poverty line of $2,000 (equivalent to $27,000 in 2025). In the nearby towns of Pasco and Kennewick, 24.4 and 25.2 percent respectively were below the poverty line; in Richland, it was just 4.9 percent. The percentage of high school graduates in Richland was 74.3 percent, compared with 53.5 in Pasco and 54.6 in Kennewick. Women constituted a quarter of the workforce, and the number of working wives was much higher than the national average. Although GE liked to present an image of a middle-class community, most of the Hanford Site employees were working-class shift workers with high school education only.

There were few senior citizens in Richland – in 1947 the AEC still required retirees to give up their homes – but the birth rate in 1948 was 34 per 1,000, well above the national average of 20 per 1,000. This tapered off during the 1950s, but there remained a larger than usual number of school-age children. There were only seven black people in Richland in 1950; this increased to 189 by 1960, when they accounted for 1.3 percent of the population. Only two black people worked for the AEC at the Hanford Site in 1951, less than a dozen were employed by GE, and about 250 by the construction contractors. The use of eating and recreational facilities by black people was discouraged, but not prohibited. Black people were even less welcome in Kennewick; only four resided there in 1950 and five in 1960. Kennewick was a sundown town where there was a curfew for black people. They congregated in Pasco, where 1,213 black people lived in a 5-acre (2.0 ha) ghetto on the town's eastern fringe. They had no sewerage or running water in 1948, because the town's leaders felt that the black community should provide the $5,000 (equivalent to $67,001 in 2025) to pay for it. Black residents also did not qualify for Federal Housing Administration (FHA) loans.

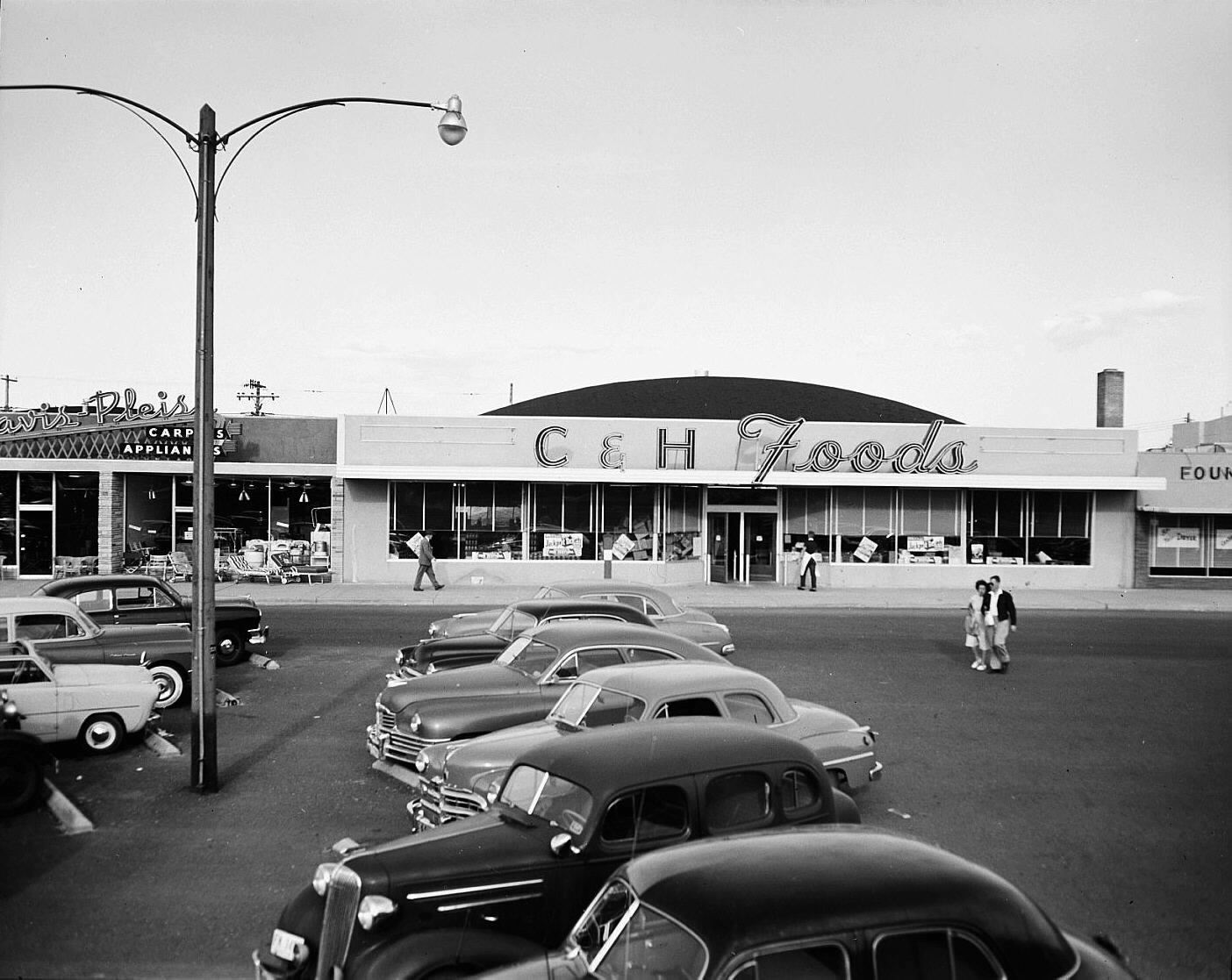
Richland's new Uptown Shopping Center in 1951

Soon after taking over from the Army, the AEC had contemplated the future of the communities of Richland, Oak Ridge, and Los Alamos. The commissioners were eager to divest the AEC of the burden of their management. In 1947, AEC general manager Carroll L. Wilson commissioned Lyman S. Moore, the city manager of Portland, Maine, and an expert on municipal government, to produce a report on the management of the communities. He produced a road map to self-government. The first step was to overhaul the accounting system to produce comparable reports on housing, commercial operations, utilities, and government. It would then be possible to move to charging market rates for rents, utilities, and municipal services, and ultimately to establish self-government. There was scant enthusiasm for this in Richland, but the United States was engaged in an ideological conflict with the Soviet Union over the superiority of the American way. The AEC's September 1950 appropriation called upon it to take steps to impose democratic government and free enterprise on the AEC communities.

The first step was taken on October 1, 1953, when the AEC increased the rents in Richland by 25% to bring them into line with those in neighboring communities. In 1955, the town voted on disposal and incorporation; both measures were overwhelmingly defeated. Nonetheless, that year Congress passed Public Law 221, which provided for the transfer of government property in Richland to the townsfolk. Thousands of people attended protest rallies and sent angry letters and petitions to Congress. Congressional hearings were held, and prices set by the FHA were reduced. People who had been dispossessed by the acquisition process during the war petitioned to be allowed to buy their property back, but they were ignored. By July 1958, 4,200 homes had been sold. After receiving assurances that the AEC would continue to subsidize schools and municipal services through the 1960s, the citizens of Richland voted for incorporation, and the town became self-governing on December 12, 1958. In 1960 Richland received an All-America City Award.

=== Camp Hanford ===
During the war the Hanford Site was patrolled by a Military Police detachment which, as of June 1945, had forty soldiers. In April 1947, they were replaced by GE security guards, who were issued M8 Greyhound armored cars. The Army was concerned that U.S. plutonium production was centered at one vulnerable site. In March 1950 the 5th Anti-aircraft Artillery Group arrived to provide air defenses, and established its headquarters in North Richland. The group consisted of four battalions, the 83rd, 501st, 518th, and 519th Anti-aircraft Artillery Battalions, each of which had four batteries of 120 mm anti-aircraft guns. Each battery had four guns, which were deployed in sandbagged revetments on a 20-acre (8.1 ha) site with wooden, prefabricated metal and containing barracks, latrines, mess halls, motor pools, radars, and administrative facilities.

The military base was designated "Camp Hanford" in 1951. The following year the guns were augmented by Nike Ajax missiles, which were deployed at three sites on Wahluke Slope and one on what is now the Fitzner-Eberhardt Arid Lands Ecology Reserve. Each site had two underground missile storage magazines, twenty missiles, and eight missile launchers. The Nike Ajax missiles were later replaced with Nike Hercules missiles. The development of intercontinental ballistic missiles made the missiles obsolete, and Camp Hanford became an outpost of Fort Lewis on July 1, 1959. The missile batteries were disbanded in 1960, and Camp Hanford was closed on March 31, 1961.

=== Early expansion ===
Cold War tensions escalated in April 1948 with the Berlin Airlift. Construction was under way on the new DR and H Reactors, but the quickest way to increase production was to restart B Reactor. This was authorized later that month. Shugg was recalled to Washington, DC, to serve as the AEC deputy general manager in August, and was succeeded by Frederick C. Schlemmer on September 16. In turn, he was succeeded by David F. Shaw on June 1, 1950.

Shaw was succeeded by James E. Travis in June 1955, and he remained the site manager until June 1965. It was also possible to improve productivity. Zirconium was added to the cans to stabilize them under high exposures, and tests confirmed that they could withstand three times the exposure used in 1946 without rupture. In March 1950, GE was authorized to run the reactors at 305 MW instead of 250. This cut the use of raw materials by half, and yielded forty percent more plutonium per operating dollar.

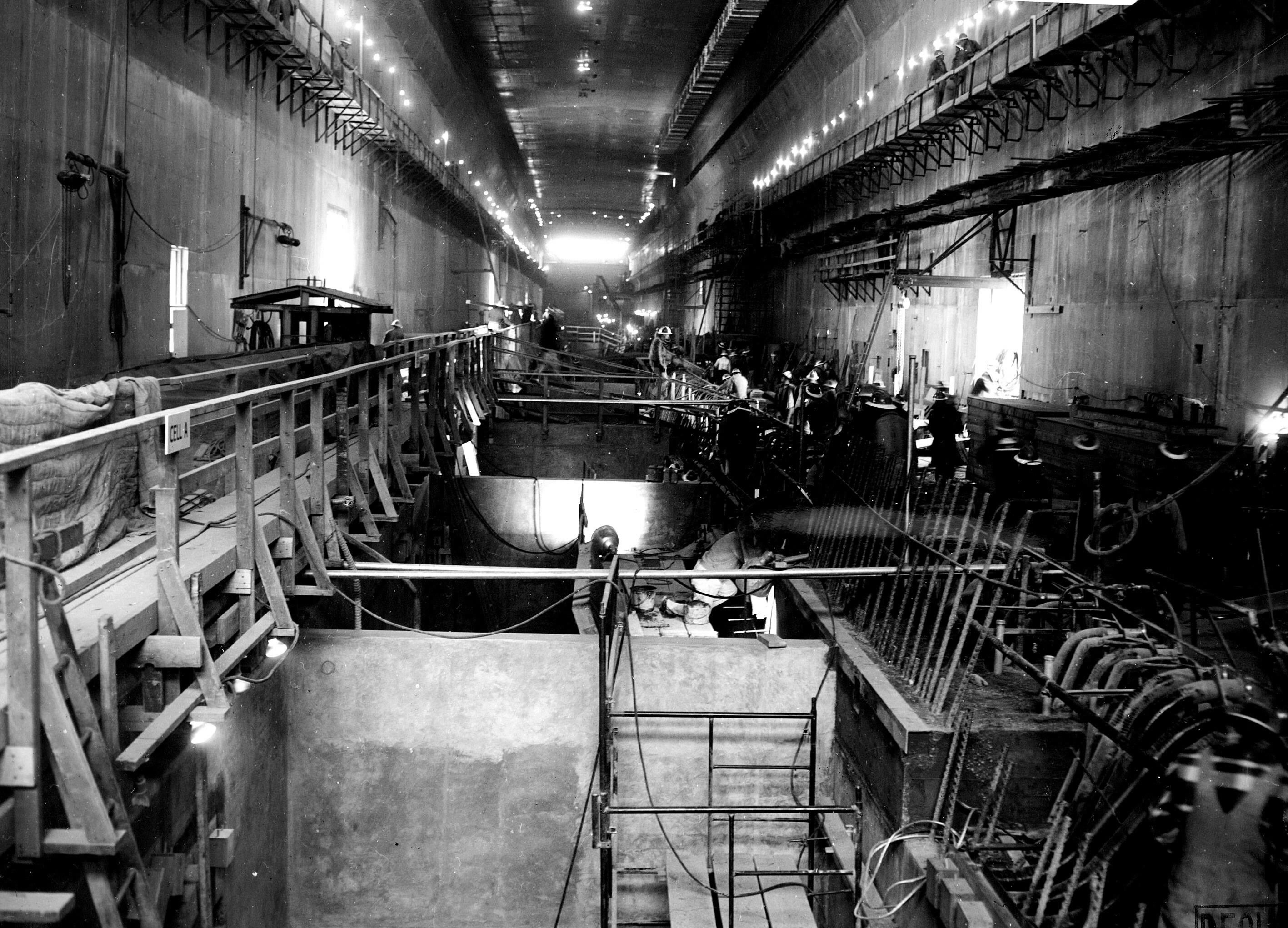
Inside the PUREX facility

The Soviet Union detonated its first atomic bomb on August 29, 1949. The explosion was detected by a U.S. Air Force weather reconnaissance aircraft four days later. In response, President Harry S. Truman authorized a crash program to develop the hydrogen bomb. Preliminary designs called for large amounts of tritium. This could be produced in a reactor using target slugs loaded with lithium deuteride and fuel rods containing enriched uranium. One or more reactors would have to be set aside for tritium production. H Reactor was chosen, and started producing tritium in 1950. For the longer term, the AEC decided to construct new reactors, of a different design using enriched uranium and heavy water as a moderator, at a new site, which became the Savannah River Site. The outbreak of the Korean War in September 1951 prompted the AEC to authorize a sixth reactor at Hanford on January 23, 1951. Construction began in June. The new reactor was built in the B area and called C Reactor. The same basic graphite-moderated design was used, with improvements to give it a rated power of 750 MW. The new reactor became operational in November 1952.

On February 25, 1952, Truman authorized two more reactors at the Hanford Site. These were called K West and K East, and were sited at Coyote Rapids between the B and D areas. They were known as "Jumbo" reactors for their much larger size. They still used the same graphite-moderator technology, but had improvements to allow them to operate at 1,800 MW. Each used 2,800 short tons (2,500 t) of graphite, over a thousand tons more than the three wartime reactors, and had concrete shields instead of steel and masonite. They had more feed tubes and reduced spacing between them. Improvements in water-pump design allowed them to have eighteen pumps instead of the fifty in the wartime reactors, but were capable of pumping 125,000 US gallons per minute (7,900 L/s). As with the other reactors, the cooling water was collected in ponds, allowed to cool, and then tipped back into the river. An innovation was that heat from the cooling water was used to heat the work places. Each Jumbo reactor required about 300 operators to run it, compared with 400 for H Reactor. This represented a saving of a million dollars a year (equivalent to $10 million in 2025). Although capable of being run at up to 4,400 MW, the AEC imposed an administrative limit of 4,000 MW on them. Since plutonium‑239 has a half-life of 24,100 years, AEC chairman Gordon Dean calculated that sufficient plutonium would be produced by the mid-1960s. With this in mind, the reactors were designed with a life of twenty years.

=== Separation facilities ===
In addition to the new reactors there were also new separation facilities. The AEC had long been dissatisfied with the wasteful bismuth phosphate separation process. GE conducted research into an alternative, reduction-oxidation (REDOX) process. This used methyl isobutyl ketone (hexone) as a solvent. It was developed at the Hanford Site in the 3706 Building and tested in the 321 Building. The AEC approved the REDOX process in May 1949, and work began on the new plant the following year. Construction ran behind schedule, and it did not commence operation until January 1952. Known as the 202-S Building or the S Plant, it was 470 feet (140 m) long and 160 feet (49 m) wide, and could process up to twelve metric tons of uranium per day, compared with the B and T Plants' 1.5 tons per day. It also had the advantage of consolidating the separation activities in one building. Unlike the bismuth phosphate process, it produced uranium as a byproduct. The low flash point of hexone meant that special precautions had to be taken against the possibility of an explosion. The hexone could not be reused as it was highly water-soluble and was unstable in nitric acid. Removing the uranium meant that the waste products were highly radioactive. The facility operated until 1967 and processed approximately 22,400 metric tons of uranium fuel rods.

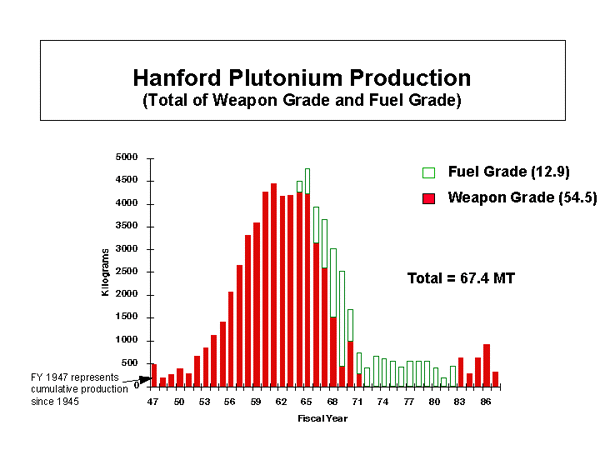
Hanford plutonium production

The U Plant was modified to use the REDOX process to recover uranium from the wastes left over from the bismuth phosphate process, but with a different solvent, tributyl phosphate. Due to the plant's layout, it could not use the tall columns and gravity flow that characterized the REDOX plant, so pulsed columns were used instead. The plutonium uranium reduction extraction (PUREX) process was developed at GE's Knolls Laboratory. The PUREX Plant, known as A Plant or Building 202‑A, commenced operation in 1955. Like the U Plant it used pulsed columns and tributyl phosphate as a solvent.

The plant was 1,000 feet (300 m) long, 400 feet (120 m) high and 52 feet (16 m) wide. The processing canyon contained eleven processing areas. It operated from 1956 to 1972, and again from 1983 to 1988, when it reprocessed spent fuel rods from the reactors, and processed approximately 66,400 metric tons of uranium fuel rods. The B and T Plants were shut down after it became operational in 1956, having processed 8,100 metric tons of fuel rods. During the 1940s, the Hanford Site dumped 400 curies (15,000 GBq) into the Columbia River each day. This rose to 7,000 curies (260,000 GBq) per day between 1951 and 1953, and peaked at 20,000 curies (740,000 GBq) per day in 1959.

=== Plutonium Finishing Plant ===
During World War II, Hanford produced plutonium nitrate (Pu(NO_{3})_{2}), which was shipped to Los Alamos, where it was turned into metallic plutonium and made into pits. After the war ended, the Los Alamos Laboratory moved to divest itself of production activities in order to devote itself to research. The Plutonium Finishing Plant was built at Hanford to carry out the purification and reduction of the plutonium to metallic form, known as "buttons", and then perform the casting, grinding, and lathing of the plutonium to turn it into pits.

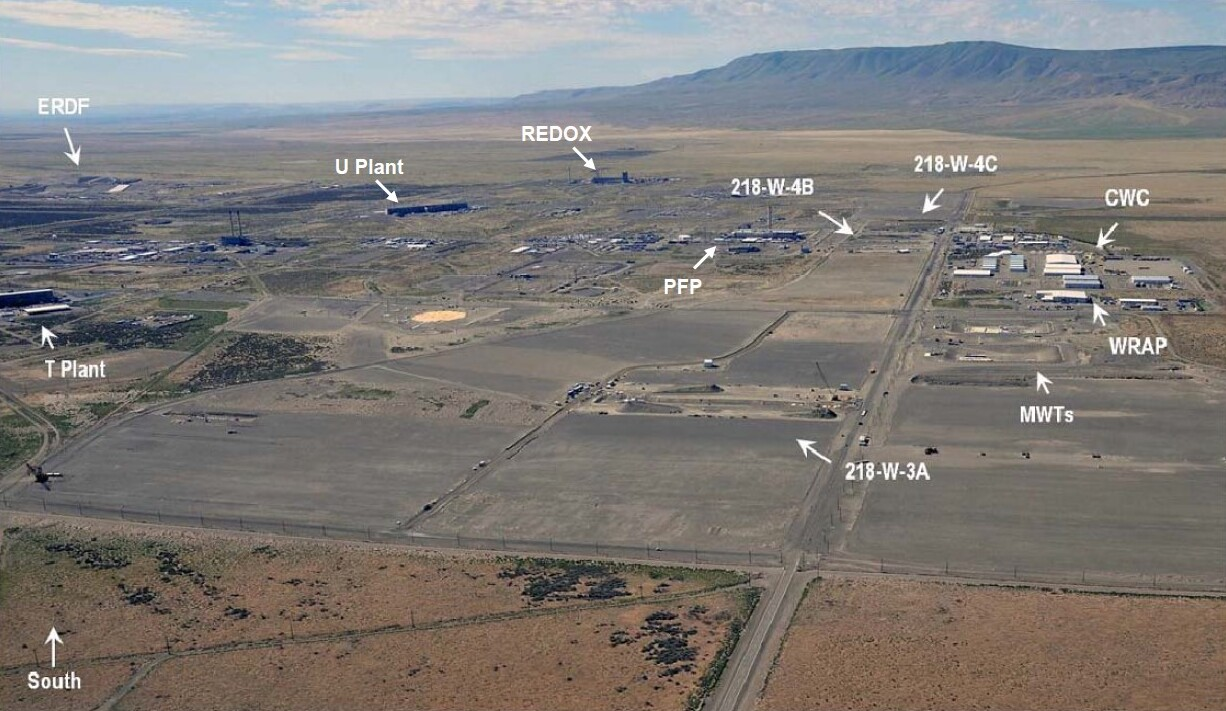
200 West Area looking south towards Rattlesnake Mountain. The Plutonium Finishing Plant is marked as PFP.

The plant operated from 1949 to 1989. In 1953, it began shipping plutonium buttons to the new Rocky Flats Plant in Colorado, which fabricated pits. Between 1957 and 1961, nine different types of pits were produced at Hanford. Pit production ended in 1965, when the AEC decided that henceforth this work would be undertaken at the Rocky Flats Site. As demand for weapons-grade plutonium declined after 1964, the Plutonium Finishing Plant began producing mixed plutonium-oxide uranium-oxide (MOX) fuel for the Fast Flux Test Facility and reactor-grade plutonium.

Plutonium was valuable, and reducing waste saved landfill and preserved the long-term radiological safety of the area by not burying quite so much highly contaminated waste. The Plutonium Finishing Plant reclaimed solid wastes in its RECUPLEX facility, combustible ones in the 232-Z Incinerator, and liquid ones in the 242-Z Waste Treatment Facility. A multi-purpose Plutonium Reclamation Facility opened in 1964.

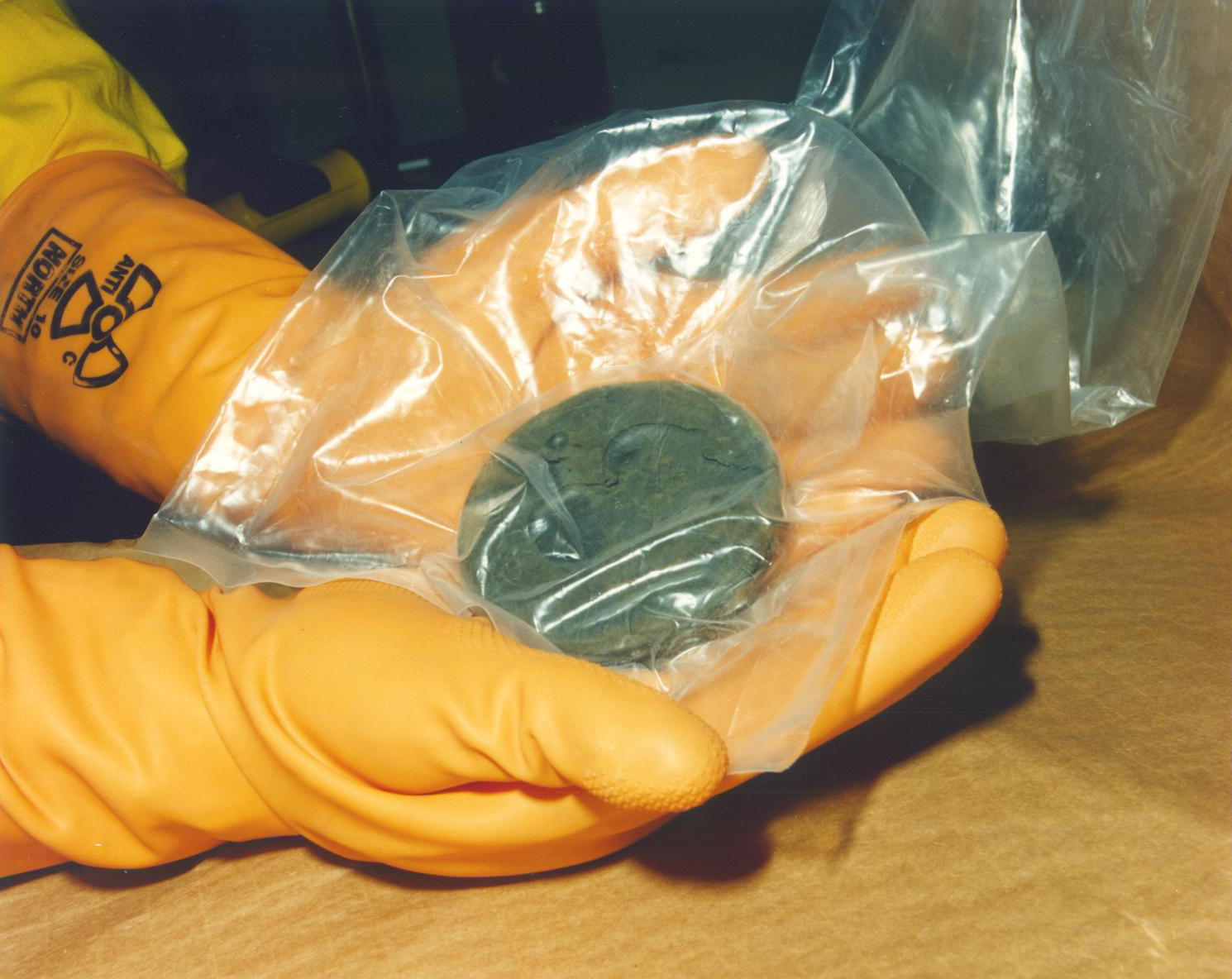
A plutonium button

A serious accident occurred at the 242-Z Waste Treatment Facility in 1976, when the contents of a glove box containing americium and plutonium exploded, seriously injuring an operator, Harold McCluskey. This accident prompted a series of reviews and evaluations that led to a 1978 decision to close most of the Plutonium Finishing Plant's facilities.

Before the plant could be demolished, approximately 18 metric tons of plutonium-bearing material was stabilized between 1996 and 2004. Legacy plutonium from plant systems was removed by 2005, and all weapons-grade plutonium was shipped to the Savannah River Site by 2009. Demolition work on the plant began in July 2017 and was completed in January 2022.

=== N Reactor ===
The reactors had all been built for plutonium production, but with the Atomic Energy Act of 1954, the Eisenhower administration began shifting resources to nuclear power generation. By the late 1950s the reactors built during the war were approaching retirement age, and in 1957 GE commenced planning to build a new reactor that would be clean, safe, and efficient, and able to generate electric power as well as produce plutonium. Construction commenced in 1959, but the electric power features were not authorized until 1962, so while it was producing plutonium in 1964, electric power did not follow until 1966. Experts debated whether nuclear power would be economically competitive with hydroelectric power, and Congress debated whether the government should be in the electricity generation business. On November 28, 1961, the AEC reached an agreement with the Washington Public Power Supply System (WPPSS) for the latter to purchase its electricity.

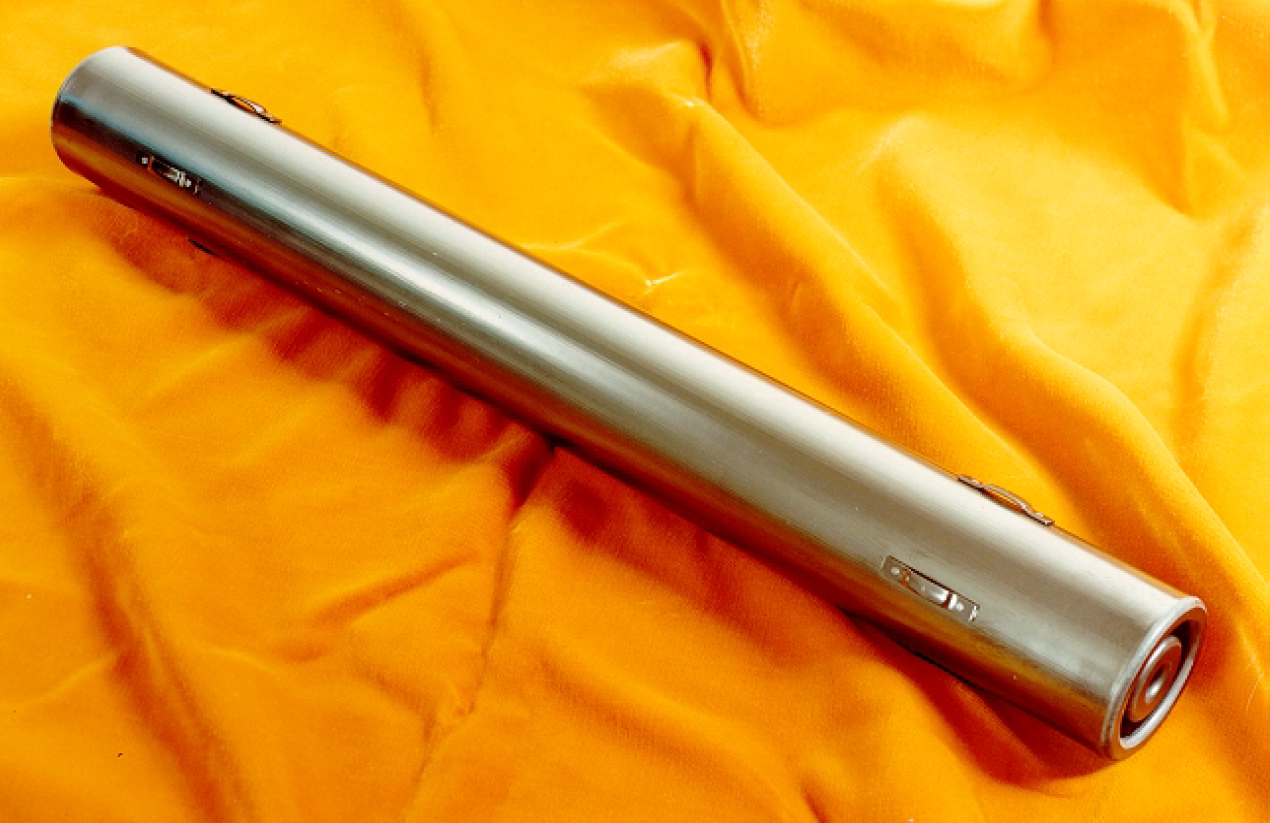
An N Reactor fuel rod. It consists of metallic uranium assemblies (two concentric cylinders with zirconium cladding) 66 centimetres (26 in) long and 6 centimetres (2.4 in) in diameter. The uranium enrichment is 1.25 percent.

N Reactor was destined to be the last of its kind, but also had many new features as a product of 1960s technology. Its zirconium alloy-clad fuel slugs were 26 inches (66 cm) long and 2.4 inches (6 cm) in diameter. It had automated fuel-loading and unloading systems, a boron-ball scram system, and a state-of-the-art control room. It was the first American graphite-moderated power reactor, and the first American dual-purpose reactor, although other countries had them. The dual-purpose concept involved trade-offs that made both purposes less efficient: power required a steam turbine, but high water temperatures risked slug failure. The solution was to build a pressurized water reactor, in which the water was pressurized to allow it to remain liquid above 100 °C (212 °F). The reactor exceeded its original $145 million budget (equivalent to $1,180 million in 2025) and cost $205 million (equivalent to $1,668 million in 2025).

The Hanford Site was now home to nine nuclear reactors along the Columbia River, five reprocessing plants on the central plateau, and more than nine hundred support buildings and radiological laboratories around the site. Extensive modifications and upgrades were made to the original three World War II reactors, and a total of 177 underground waste tanks were built. Hanford was at its peak production from 1956 to 1965. Over the forty years of operation the site produced about 67.4 metric tons of plutonium, of which 54.5 metric tons was weapons-grade plutonium, supplying the majority of the 60,000 weapons in the U.S. arsenal. In 1983 and 1984, 425 kilograms of weapons-grade plutonium was extracted from reactor-grade plutonium. Tritium, polonium‑210, thulium-170, iridium-192, and uranium-233 were also produced.

=== Decommissioning ===
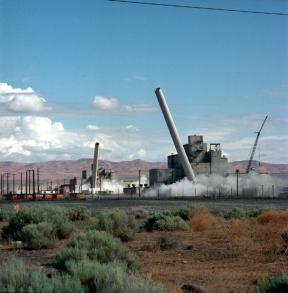
Decommissioning D Reactor

By 1963 the AEC had estimated that it had sufficient plutonium for its needs for the foreseeable future, and planned to shut down the production reactors. To mitigate the economic impact, closures were carried out over a period of six years. The change of policy was not publicly announced; instead, each round of closures was accompanied by a statement that production needs could be met by the remaining facilities. The first round of closures was announced by President Johnson on January 8, 1964. DR, H, and F Reactors were shut down in 1964 and, 1965. In 1967 the AEC announced that another reactor would be shut down. This was D Reactor, which was shut down on June 25, 1967. B Reactor followed on February 12, 1968.

In January 1969, AEC chairman Glenn Seaborg, under pressure from the newly elected Nixon administration to cut costs, announced that the three reactors built in the 1950s, C, KE, and KW, would be shut down in 1969 and 1970. The REDOX and PUREX facilities were placed on standby status in December 1967 and June 1972 respectively. Between 1967 and 1971, the number of workers employed at the Hanford Site plummeted from 8,500 to 5,500. The incremental closures did nothing to reduce the public outcry; if anything, the reverse was the case. The AEC was replaced by the Energy Research and Development Administration in 1974, and it in turn was succeeded by the United States Department of Energy (DOE) in 1977. The regulation and licensing of commercial reactors was devolved to the Nuclear Regulatory Commission (NRC).

The closures left only N Reactor, which continued to operate as a dual-purpose reactor, providing power to the civilian electrical grid via the WPPSS. By 1966 it was producing 35 percent of the United States' nuclear-generated electricity. Costs were lower than anticipated, allowing the WPPSS to retire $25 million budget (equivalent to $189 million in 2025) of the $122 million (equivalent to $923 million in 2025) it had raised in bonds to finance the project. The Chernobyl disaster in the Soviet Union in April 1986 prompted multiple reviews of the safety of American reactors. Of all the reactors in the U.S., N Reactor was the most similar to the ill-fated No. 4 Reactor at the Chernobyl Nuclear Power Plant, in that it was graphite-moderated, although N Reactor used pressurized water rather than boiling water as a coolant. Like all the Hanford Site's reactors, it had no containment vessel and would never have passed the NRC's reactor safety requirements had they been applied to it. There was a public outcry, and the Government Accountability Office recommended closure. N Reactor was shut down in January 1987. The PUREX plant reopened in 1983 to reprocess N Reactor reactor-grade fuel into weapon-grade fuel. This ended in December 1988, and it returned to standby status in October 1990. The uranium trioxide plant closed in 1995, the PUREX plant closed for good in 1997, and the B Plant in 1998. The T Plant remained in use, handling the storage, packaging, and decontamination of radioactive wastes. It became the longest operational nuclear facility in the world.

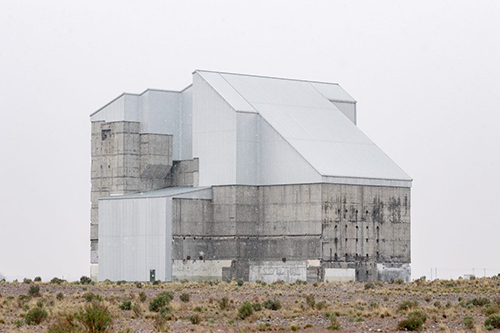
H Reactor after cocooning

All but two of the Hanford production reactors were entombed ("cocooned") to allow the radioactive materials to decay, and the surrounding structures removed and buried. This involved the removal of hundreds of tons of asbestos, concrete, steel, and contaminated soil. The pumps and tunnels were dug up and razed, as were the auxiliary buildings. What was left were the core and shields. These were sealed up and a sloped steel roof added to draw off rainwater. Cocooning of C Reactor commenced in 1996, and was completed in 1998. D Reactor followed in 2002, F Reactor followed in 2003, DR Reactor in 2004. and H Reactor in 2005. N Reactor was cocooned in 2012, and KE in 2022. KW is planned to be cocooned around 2030.

Only B Reactor will remain unenclosed. It was listed on the National Register of Historic Places in 1992. Some historians advocated converting it into a museum. It was designated a National Historic Landmark by the National Park Service on August 19, 2008, and, on November 10, 2015, it became part of the Manhattan Project National Historical Park alongside other sites at Oak Ridge and Los Alamos. The DOE offers free guided tours of the site which can be reserved via the department's website, and are open to all ages. Between 2009 and 2018, approximately eighty thousand people visited the site, bringing an estimated annual tourist income of two million dollars to the surrounding area.

Hanford production reactors
Reactor name	Start-up date	Shutdown date	Initial power (MW)	Final power (MW)	Cocooned
B Reactor	September 25, 1944	February 12, 1968	250	2,210	Not cocooned
D Reactor	December 14, 1944	June 25, 1967	250	2,165	2004
F Reactor	February 24, 1945	June 25, 1965	250	2,040	2003
H Reactor	October 19, 1949	April 21, 1965	400	2,140	2005
DR ("D Replacement") Reactor	October 3, 1950	December 30, 1964	250	2,015	2002
C Reactor	November 18, 1952	April 25, 1969	650	2,500	1998
KW ("K West") Reactor	January 4, 1955	February 1, 1970	1,800	4,400	Not cocooned
KE ("K East") Reactor	April 17, 1955	January 1971	1,800	4,400	2022
N Reactor	December 1963	January 1987	4,000	4,000	2012

== Later operations ==
Although uranium enrichment and plutonium breeding were slowly phased out, the nuclear legacy left an indelible mark on the Tri-Cities. Since World War II, the area had developed from a small farming community to a booming "Atomic Frontier" to a powerhouse of the nuclear-industrial complex. Decades of federal investment created a community of highly skilled scientists and engineers. As a result of this concentration of specialized skills, the Hanford Site attempted to diversify its operations to include scientific research, test facilities, and commercial nuclear power production.

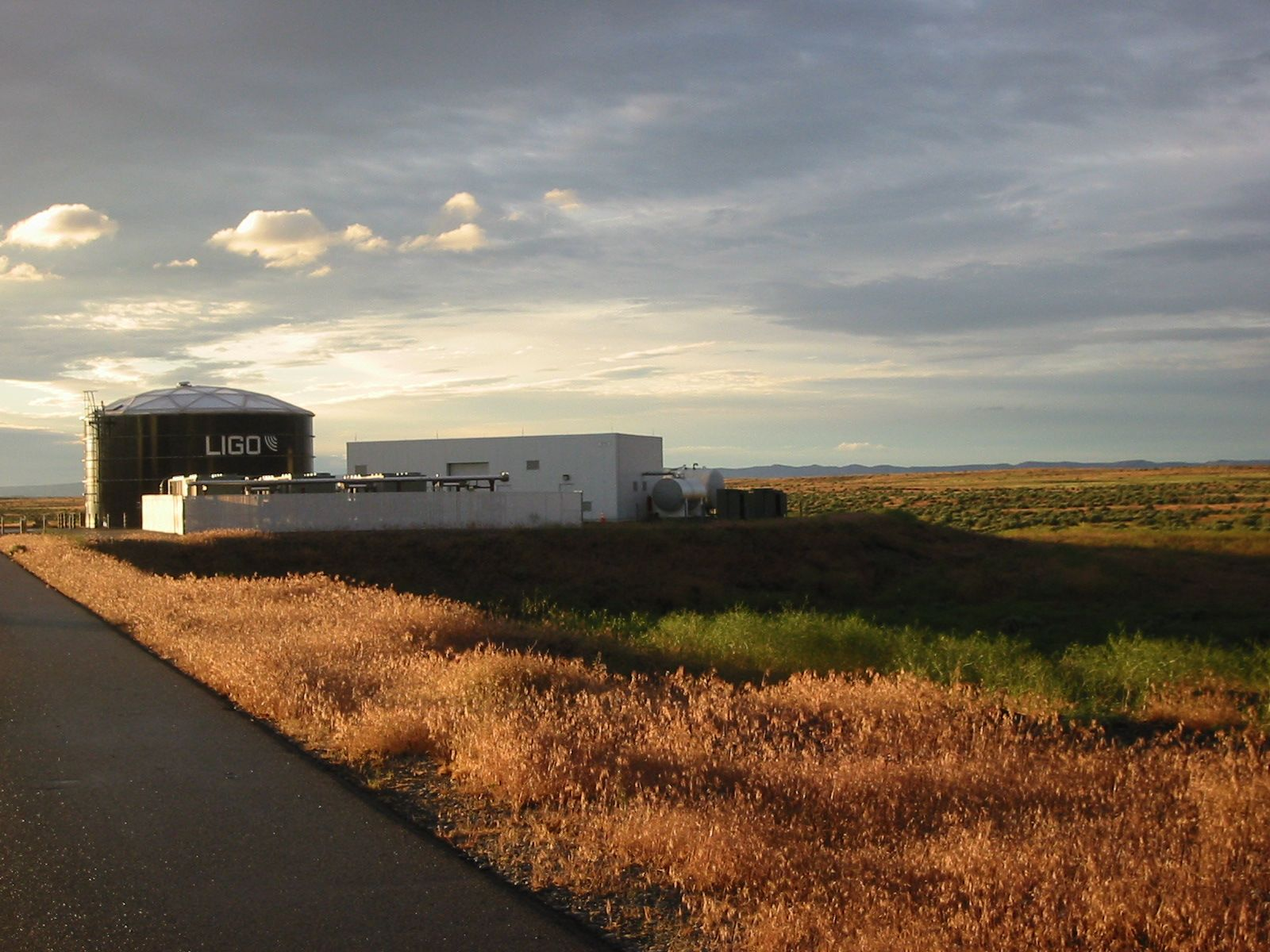
LIGO interferometer building at the Hanford Site

When GE announced that it was ending the contract to run the Hanford Site in 1963, the AEC decided to separate the contract among multiple operators. The contract to run the research laboratory at the site was awarded to the Battelle Memorial Institute of Columbus, Ohio, on May 28, 1964, and the laboratory became the Pacific Northwest Laboratory on January 4, 1965. In 1995, it achieved national laboratory status and became The Pacific Northwest National Laboratory. Battelle's contract allowed it to perform research for government and private companies, so it was able to branch out into related areas. In 2022, the laboratory employed 5,314 staff and had an annual budget of $1.2 billion.

The Fast Flux Test Facility (FFTF), was a national research facility that began operating in 1982 to develop and test fuels, materials, and components for the Clinch River Breeder Reactor project. The contract to construct and operate it was awarded to Westinghouse and 800 former Battelle employees who had been working on it were transferred. The Clinch River project was canceled by Congress in 1983, but the FFTF continued to operate, generating plutonium‑238 for nuclear power sources for NASA space missions and tritium for nuclear fusion research. It was shut down in 2009.

The Laser Interferometer Gravitational-Wave Observatory (LIGO) is an interferometer searching for gravitational waves. The observatory at the Hanford Site was one of two, the other being in Livingston, Louisiana. The project was run as a cooperative venture by MIT and Caltech. The $211 million price tag (equivalent to $434 million in 2025) generated debate about pork barreling and government funding of expensive Big Science projects, especially one as uncertain of success as LIGO. The Hanford Site was chosen from seventeen contenders for one of the two sites, mainly due to its relative isolation. In 2016 it was announced that gravitational waves had been detected. In 2018 the American Physical Society (APS) designated the two LIGO observatories as APS historic sites.

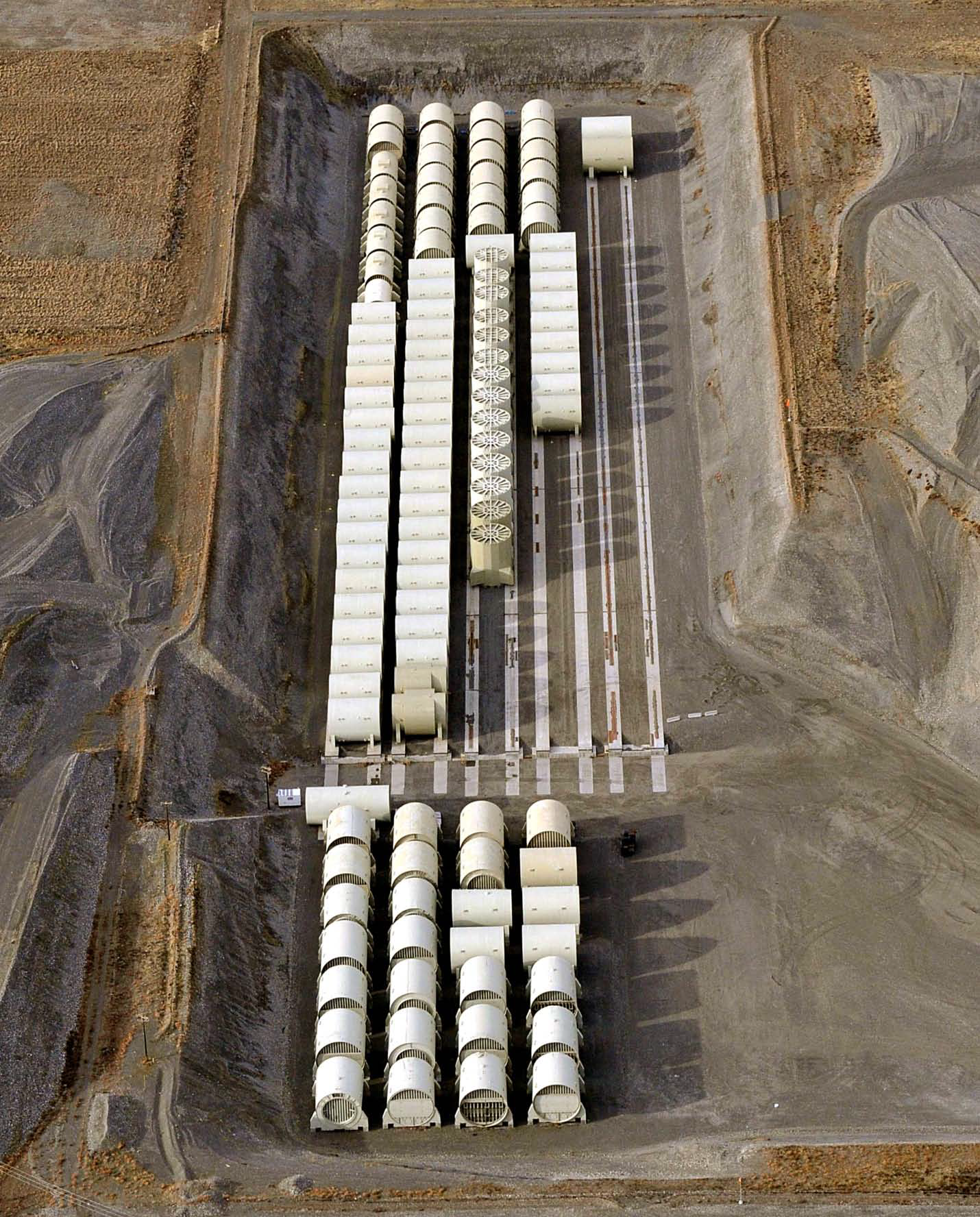
Trench 94, the Naval Reactor Disposal Site

Decommissioned United States naval reactors are stored in Trench 94, a 1,100-foot (340 m) trench in the 200 Area at the Hanford Site under the Ship-Submarine Recycling Program. Although the fuel has been removed and shipped to the Idaho National Laboratory, the section housing the reactor still has about 25,000 curies (920,000 GBq) remaining. This is expected to decline by three orders of magnitude in about 1,000 years. The reactors are stored in High Integrity Containers (HICs) designed to last for at least 300 years. They are shipped by barge up the Columbia River and then trucked overland to the Hanford Site.

The Columbia Generating Station is a 1,207 MW commercial nuclear power plant located on the Hanford Site 10 miles (16 km) north of Richland and operated by Energy Northwest, as the WPPSS has been known since 1998. Originally, five boiling water reactors were authorized in March 1973, but only one, WNP‑2, was completed. It began producing power in May 1984. The WNP-1 Reactor was budgeted to cost $660 million in 1973 (equivalent to $3,647 million in 2025) and be completed by 1980. By 1986, the estimated cost had blown out to $3.8 billion (equivalent to $9 billion in 2025) and the reactor was still unfinished. Meanwhile, the estimated total cost of the entire project had increased from $4.1 billion in 1973 (equivalent to $10 billion in 2025) to $24 billion in 1986 (equivalent to $60 billion in 2025). A net billing agreement that Senator Henry M. Jackson helped steer through Congress ensured that the bonds issue to finance their construction carried a AAA bond credit rating and therefore sold easily, but electricity tariffs had to be increased to repay the bond holders.

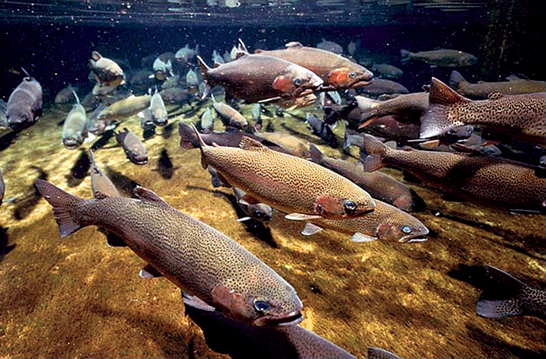
Salmon spawning in the Hanford Reach near the H Reactor

The Hanford Reach was preserved as a salmon breeding ground. The end of plutonium production at the Hanford Site meant that it no longer required the areas around the old production sites. On June 9, 2000, President Bill Clinton designated almost 200,000 hectares (490,000 acres) of the Hanford Site as a national monument. The Hanford Reach National Monument is managed by the United States Fish and Wildlife Service under an agreement with the DOE. On June 28, 2000, a fire burned 164,000 acres (66,000 ha) of the monument.

In July 2024, the DOE announced it would construct a 1 GW solar array at the Hanford Site.

== Environmental concerns ==
Between 1944 and 1971, pump systems drew as much as 75,000 US gallons per minute (4,700 L/s) of cooling water from the Columbia River to dissipate the heat produced by the reactors. Before its release into the river, the used water was held in large tanks known as retention basins for up to six hours. Longer-lived isotopes were not affected by this retention, and several terabecquerels entered the river every day. The federal government kept knowledge about these radioactive releases secret. Radiation was later measured 200 miles (320 km) downstream as far west as the Washington and Oregon coasts. It was estimated that a person who had daily eaten 2.2 pounds (1.00 kg) of fish caught at Richland would have received an additional radiation dose of 1,300 millirems (0.013 Sv) per year. Native Americans were known to eat fish, berries and roots from within and along the river. The largest radiation dose probably came from eating fish. Barge workers also drank from the contaminated river.

In 1970, contamination was found in ducks collected from waste ponds at the Hanford site. Had a person eaten half a pound of the meat, the radiation dose to their bones would have been four times the annual acceptable level.

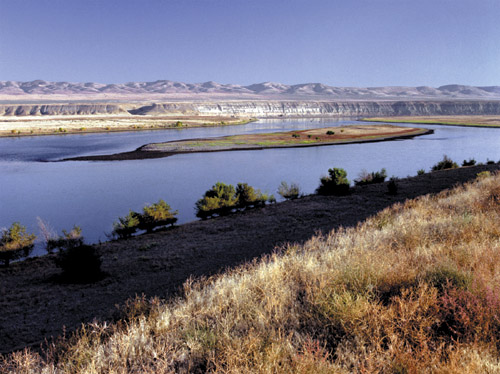
The Hanford Reach of the Columbia River, where radioactivity was released from 1944 to 1971

The plutonium separation process resulted in the release of radioactive isotopes into the air, which were carried by the wind throughout southeastern Washington and into parts of Idaho, Montana, Oregon, and British Columbia. Downwinders were exposed to radionuclides, particularly iodine-131, with the heaviest releases from 1945 to 1951. These radionuclides entered the food chain via dairy cows grazing on contaminated fields; hazardous fallout was ingested by communities who consumed radioactive food and milk. Most of these airborne releases were a part of Hanford's routine operations, while a few of the larger releases occurred in isolated incidents. In 1949 an intentional release known as the "Green Run" released 8,000 curies (300,000 GBq) of iodine‑131 over two days. A U.S. government report released in 1992 estimated that 685,000 curies (25,300,000 GBq) of iodine‑131 had been released into the river and air from the Hanford Site between 1944 and 1947.

Beginning in the 1960s scientists with the U.S. Public Health Service published reports about radioactivity released from Hanford, and there were protests from the health departments of Oregon and Washington. In response to an article in the Spokane Spokesman Review in September 1985, the DOE announced it would declassify environmental records and, in February 1986, released 19,000 pages of previously unavailable historical documents about Hanford's operations. The Washington State Department of Health collaborated with the citizen-led Hanford Health Information Network to publicize data about the health effects of Hanford's operations. Their reports concluded that residents who lived downwind from Hanford or who used the Columbia River downstream were exposed to elevated doses of radiation that placed them at increased risk for cancer and other diseases, particularly forms of thyroid disease. A mass tort lawsuit was brought by two thousand Hanford downwinders. In 2005 two of six plaintiffs who went to trial were awarded $500,000 in damages. The DOE resolved the final cases in October 2015, paying out more than $60 million in legal fees and $7 million in damages.

=== Tank farm leaks ===
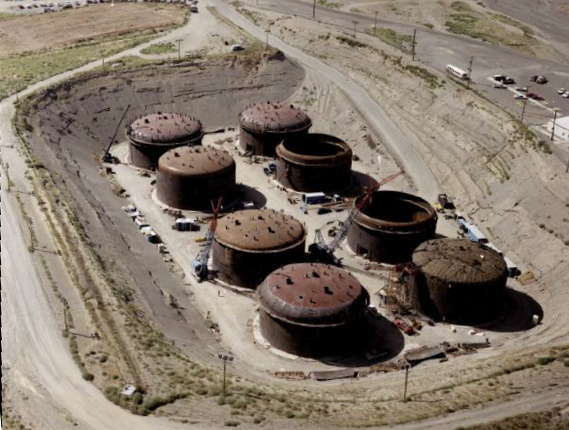
Double-shell tank farm "AP" under construction. Early 1980s

Of the 177 tanks at Hanford, 149 had a single shell. Historically single-shell tanks were used for storing radioactive liquid waste and designed to last twenty years. By 2005, some liquid waste was transferred from single-shell tanks to safer double-shell tanks. A substantial amount of residue remains in the older single-shell tanks with one containing an estimated 447,000 US gallons (1,690,000 L) of radioactive sludge, for example. It is believed that up to six of these "empty" tanks are leaking. Two tanks were reportedly leaking 300 US gallons (1,100 L) per year each, while the remaining four tanks were each leaking 15 US gallons (57 L) per year. In February 2013, Washington Governor Jay Inslee announced that a tank storing radioactive waste at the site had been leaking liquids on average of 150 to 300 US gallons (570 to 1,140 L) per year. He said that though the leak posed no immediate health risk to the public, it should not be an excuse for not doing anything. On February 22, 2013, he stated that six more tanks were leaking.

=== CDC study ===
Calculated thyroid dose from "all exposure pathways (milk cows on fresh pasture)", year 1945.

In 1989 the CDC began the Hanford Thyroid Disease Study to evaluate the impact of the airborne releases of iodine-131. A draft was released January 1999 under public pressure to see the report before the CDC could make changes to it, and the National Academy of Sciences-National Research Council desired to have an open review of the report. It was conducted by the Fred Hutchinson Cancer Research Center and focused on people who were children during peak exposures in 1945 to 1946. The study was designed to show a relationship between the level of iodine-131 exposure and certain thyroid diseases later in life in 3,440 persons born from 1940 through 1946. The conclusion was there was no evidence that the Hanford iodine-131 releases increased incidents of thyroid cancer, benign thyroid nodules, autoimmune thyroiditis, or hypothyroidism.

Many citizens were upset at the findings. On June 19, 1999, during a fact-finding mission held by the NAS in Spokane, Owen Hoffman, an authority on environmental risk, said the study may not be statistically powerful enough to detect an effect. The National Research Council released their review of the draft report in 2000, finding the study well designed and its clinical examinations and lab studies of good quality. But there were doubts about the precision of the iodine-131 exposure estimates; "[E]xposures that took place 40–50 years ago could not be precisely estimated and ... such a situation could substantially reduce the ability of the study to detect a radiation effect." Therefore, the study draft was too confident in its conclusion. Nevertheless, the review wrote it's doubtful a better study could have been conducted unless the exposure estimates could be improved.

On June 21, 2002 the study's final report was released at an open meeting in Richland to an attendance of about 100 people, presented by Michael A. McGeehin. The report itself concluded: "[T]he results of the HTDS provide no evidence of a statistically significant association between increasing thyroid radiation dose from Hanford and the cumulative incidence of any of the disease outcomes studied or the prevalence of thyroid [ultrasound-detected abnormalities]. These findings do not definitively rule out the possibility that Hanford radiation exposures are associated with an increase in one or more of the outcomes under investigation. However, it does mean that if such associations exist, they were likely too small to detect using the best epidemiological methods available.

The study was criticized in a review by Owen Hoffman and four other scientists in the field of epidemiology and risk analysis, again regarding the uncertainties in the exposure estimates, and recommending the results instead "be interpreted as inconclusive rather than as evidence for little or no disease risk from Hanford exposures."

== Occupational health concerns ==
While major releases of radioactive material ended with the reactor shutdown in the 1970s and many of the most dangerous wastes are contained, there were continued concerns about contaminated groundwater headed toward the Columbia River and about workers' health and safety. In 1976, Harold McCluskey, a Hanford technician, received the largest recorded dose of americium following a laboratory accident in the Plutonium Finishing Plant. Due to prompt medical intervention, he survived the incident and died eleven years later of natural causes.

Since 1987, workers have reported exposure to harmful vapors after working around underground nuclear storage tanks, with no solution found. More than forty workers in 2014 alone reported smelling vapors and became ill with "nosebleeds, headaches, watery eyes, burning skin, contact dermatitis, increased heart rate, difficulty breathing, coughing, sore throats, expectorating, dizziness, and nausea ... Several of these workers have long-term disabilities." Doctors checked workers and cleared them to return to work. Monitors worn by tank workers have found no samples with chemicals close to the federal limit for occupational exposure.

In August 2014, OSHA ordered the facility to rehire a contractor and pay $220,000 in back wages for firing the employee for whistleblowing on safety concerns at the site. On November 19, 2014, the attorney general of Washington, Bob Ferguson, said the state planned to sue the DOE and its contractor to protect workers from hazardous vapors at Hanford. A 2014 report by the DOE Savannah River National Laboratory initiated by 'Washington River Protection Solutions' found that DOE's methods to study vapor releases were inadequate, particularly, that they did not account for short but intense vapor releases. They recommended "proactively sampling the air inside tanks to determine its chemical makeup; accelerating new practices to prevent worker exposures; and modifying medical evaluations to reflect how workers are exposed to vapors".

== Cleanup under Superfund ==
=== Organization ===
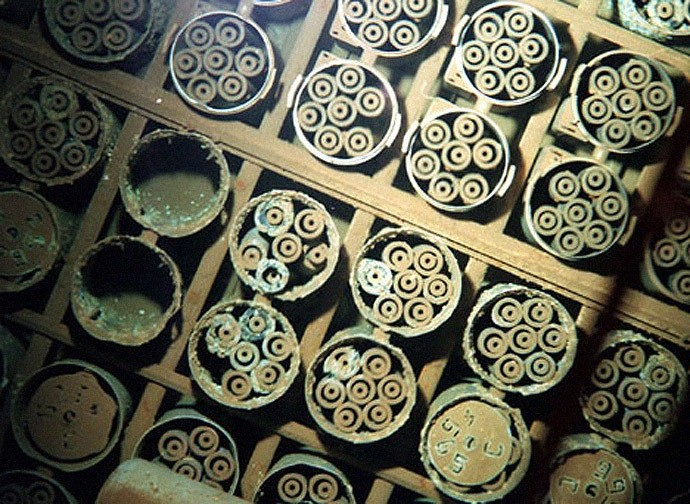
Spent nuclear fuel stored underwater and uncapped in Hanford's K‑East Basin

Decades of manufacturing left behind 53 million US gallons (200 ML) of high-level radioactive waste stored within 177 storage tanks, an additional 25 million cubic feet (710,000 m^{3}) of solid radioactive waste, and areas of heavy technetium-99 and uranium-contaminated groundwater beneath three tank farms on the site as well as the potential for future groundwater contamination beneath currently contaminated soils. On June 25, 1988, the Hanford Site was divided into four areas and proposed for inclusion on the National Priorities List.

On May 15, 1989, the Washington Department of Ecology (WSDE), the United States Environmental Protection Agency (EPA), and the DOE entered into the Tri-Party Agreement, which provides a legal framework for environmental remediation at Hanford. By 2014, the agencies were engaged in the world's largest environmental cleanup, with many challenges to be resolved in the face of overlapping technical, political, regulatory, and cultural interests. The cleanup effort was focused on three outcomes: restoring the Columbia River corridor for other uses, converting the central plateau to long-term waste treatment and storage, and preparing for the future. In 2020, WSDE issued the DOE with a $1.065 million penalty for restricting WSDE from direct access to facility data required for regulatory oversight in accord with the Tri-Party Agreement; a settlement agreement being finalized in 2023.

In 2011, DOE, the federal agency charged with overseeing the site, "interim stabilized" 149 single-shell tanks by pumping nearly all the liquid waste out into 28 newer double-shell tanks. Solids, known as salt cake and sludge, remained. The DOE later found water intruding into at least 14 single-shell tanks and that one of them had been leaking about 640 US gallons (2,400 L) per year into the ground since about 2010. In 2012, the DOE also discovered a leak from a double-shell tank caused by construction flaws and corrosion in the tank's bottom, and that twelve other double-shell tanks had similar construction flaws. Since then, the DOE began monitoring single-shell tanks monthly and double-shell tanks every three years. The DOE also changed the methods by which they monitored the tanks. In March 2014, the DOE announced further delays in the construction of the Waste Treatment Plant, which affected the schedule for removing waste from the tanks.

The cleanup effort was managed by the DOE under the oversight of the two regulatory agencies. A citizen-led Hanford Advisory Board provides recommendations from community stakeholders, including local and state governments, regional environmental organizations, business interests, and Native American tribes. For the Native Americans, the cleanup took on a moral and religious aspect. A particular focus was the conservation of indigenous fauna and flora, such as the Umtanum desert buckwheat, which only grows in the area and was prized by Native Americans for its medicinal properties.

=== Cleanup activities ===
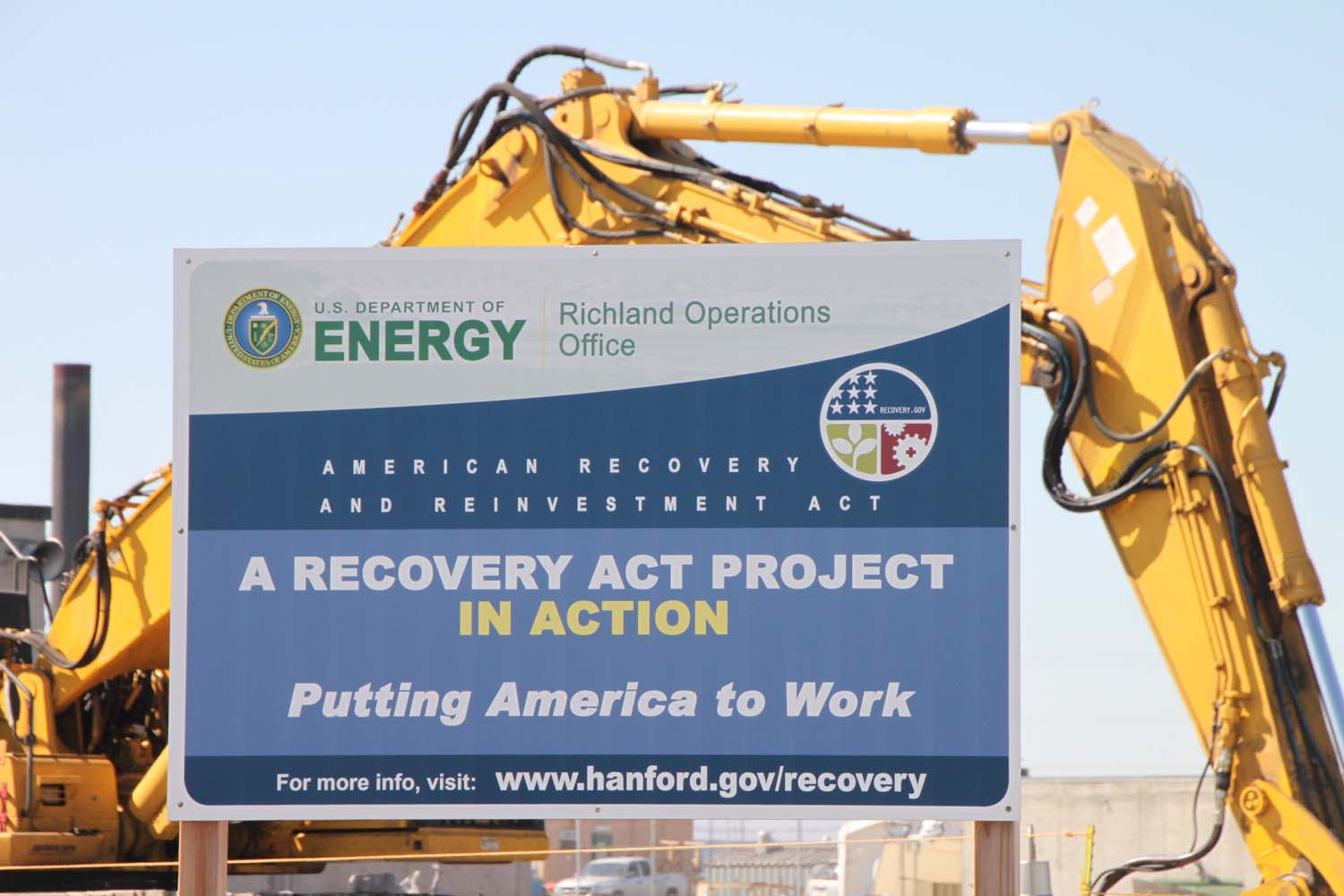
Recovery Act-funded work

Citing the 2014 Hanford Lifecycle Scope Schedule and Cost report, the 2014 estimated cost of the remaining Hanford cleanup was $113.6 billion – more than $3 billion per year for six years, with a lower cost projection of approximately $2 billion per year until 2046.

Originally scheduled to be complete within thirty years, the cleanup was less than half finished by 2008. Of the four areas that were formally listed as Superfund sites on October 4, 1989, only one had been removed from the list. Intermittent discoveries of undocumented contamination have slowed the pace and raised the cost of cleanup. Cleanup activity was still ongoing in 2023, with over 10,000 workers employed on cleanup activities.

The most significant challenge was stabilizing the 53,000,000 US gallons (200 ML) of high-level radioactive waste stored in the 177 underground tanks. By 1998 about a third of these tanks had leaked waste into the soil and groundwater. By 2008 most of the liquid waste had been transferred to more secure double-shelled tanks; however, 2,800,000 US gallons (11 ML) of liquid waste, together with 27,000,000 US gallons (100,000,000 L) of salt cake and sludge, remains in the single-shelled tanks.

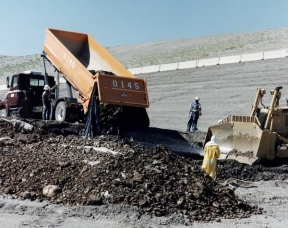
Grand opening of the Environmental Restoration Disposal Facility (ERDF)

DOE lacked information about the extent to which the 27 double-shell tanks may be susceptible to corrosion. Without determining the extent to which the factors that contributed to the leak in AY‑102 were similar to the other 27 double-shell tanks, DOE could not be sure how long its double-shell tanks can safely store waste. That waste was originally scheduled to be removed by 2018. By 2008, the revised deadline was 2040. By 2008, 1,000,000 US gallons (3,800,000 L) of radioactive waste was traveling through the groundwater toward the Columbia River. This waste was expected to reach the river in twelve to fifty years if cleanup does not proceed on schedule. Under the Tri-Party Agreement, lower-level hazardous wastes are buried in huge lined pits that will be sealed and monitored with sophisticated instruments for many years. Disposal of plutonium and other high-level wastes is a more difficult problem that continues to be a subject of intense debate. As an example, plutonium‑239 has a half-life of 24,100 years, and a decay of ten half-lives is required before a sample is considered to cease its radioactivity. In 2000 the DOE awarded a $4.3 billion contract to Bechtel, a San Francisco-based construction and engineering firm, to build a vitrification plant to combine the dangerous wastes with glass to render them stable. Construction began in 2002. The plant was originally scheduled to be operational by 2011, with vitrification completed by 2028.

According to a 2012 study by the Government Accountability Office, there were a number of serious unresolved technical and managerial problems. In 2013 the estimated costs were $13.4 billion with commencement of operations estimated to be in 2022 and about three decades of operation. A potential radioactive leak was reported in 2013; the cleanup was estimated to have cost $40 billion, with $115 billion more required. Another leak was reported in April 2021.

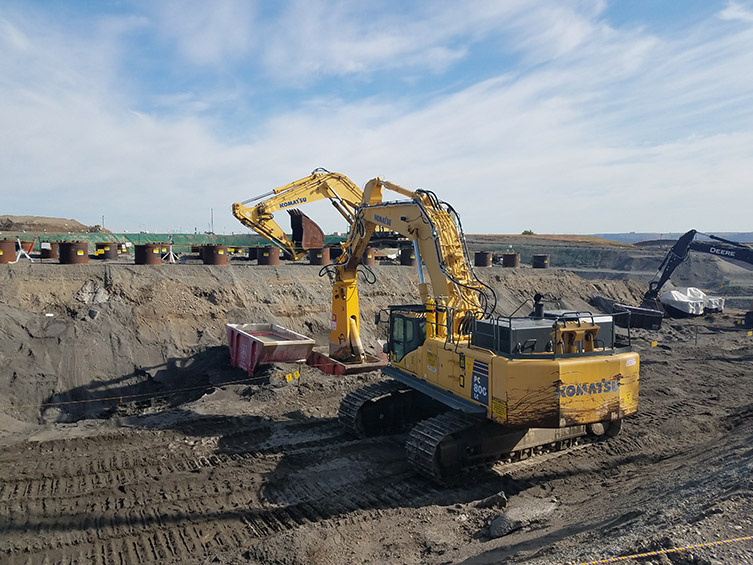
Heavy equipment removing buried pieces of pipe filled with contaminated waste

In May 2007 state and federal officials began closed-door negotiations about the possibility of extending legal cleanup deadlines for waste vitrification in exchange for shifting the focus of the cleanup to urgent priorities, such as groundwater remediation. Those talks stalled in October 2007. In early 2008, a $600 million cut to the Hanford cleanup budget was proposed. Washington state officials expressed concern about the budget cuts, as well as missed deadlines and recent safety lapses at the site, and threatened to file a lawsuit alleging that the DOE was in violation of environmental laws. They appeared to step back from that threat in April 2008 after another meeting of federal and state officials resulted in progress toward a tentative agreement. Some of the radioactive waste at Hanford was supposed to be stored in the planned Yucca Mountain nuclear waste repository, but after that project was suspended, Washington State sued, joined by South Carolina. Their first suit was dismissed in July 2011. In a subsequent suit, federal authorities were ordered to either approve or reject plans for the Yucca Mountain storage site.

During excavations from 2004 to 2007, a sample of purified plutonium was uncovered inside a safe in a waste trench, and has been dated to about the 1940s, making it the second-oldest sample of purified plutonium known to exist. Analyses published in 2009 concluded that the sample originated at Oak Ridge, and was one of several sent to Hanford for optimization tests of the T Plant until Hanford could produce its own plutonium. Documents refer to such a sample, belonging to "Watt's group", which was disposed of in its safe when a radiation leak was suspected.

As of 2023, 60 sq mi (160 km^{2}) of the site's groundwater remains contaminated above federal standards, a reduction from 80 sq mi (210 km^{2}) in the 1980s.

Radioactive waste inside a single-shell tank in the "AX" tank farm, before waste retrieval

During the construction of the vitrification plant, designed to handle low-activity waste, a separate part of plant to separate low-activity from high-activity waste (principally, cesium isotopes) had also been started. Questions were raised about the planned separation technology in addition how to handle the high-level waste, so the separation facility was scrapped in favor of the Tank Side Cesium Removal (TSCR) system, a much smaller and more modular system using filtration and ion exchange columns to strip the high-level waste components, and sending low-activity back into the tank farms for later treatment at the low-activity vitrification plant. The high-level waste will be held in containers on site for future disposal, either via burial or vitrification. The TSCR technology is based on similar technology used in part of the cleanup of the Fukushima nuclear accident. TSCR started processing waste on January 26, 2022. The vitrification plant accepted its first batch of low-activity waste from the tank farms on October 8, 2025, ahead of the October 15, 2025 deadline, to start operations at the plant.

Hanford organizations
Date begun	Organization	Responsibility	Remarks
December 12, 1942	U.S. Army Corps of Engineers	Lead U.S. Government entity	Held role until January 1, 1947
December 12, 1942	E. I. DuPont de Nemours & Company (DuPont)	All site activities	Initial Hanford site contractor
September 1, 1946	General Electric Company (GE)	All site activities	Replaced DuPont
January 1, 1947	Atomic Energy Commission	Lead U.S. Government entity	Replaced U.S. Army Corps of Engineers
May 15, 1953	Vitro Engineers	Hanford Engineering Services	Assumed GEs new facility design role
June 1, 1953	J. A. Jones Construction	Hanford Construction Services	Assumed GEs construction role
January 1, 1965	U.S. Testing	Environmental & bioassay testing	Assumed GEs environmental and bioassay testing role
January 4, 1965	Battelle Memorial Institute	Pacific Northwest Laboratory (PNL)	Assumed GE's laboratory operations – subsequently renamed Pacific Northwest National Laboratory
July 1, 1965	Computer Sciences Corporation (CSC)	Computer services	New scope
August 1, 1965	Hanford Occupational Health Foundation	Industrial Medicine	Assumed GE's industrial medicine role
September 10, 1965	Douglas United Nuclear	Single pass reactor operations & fuel fabrication	Assumed part of GE's reactor operations
January 1, 1966	Isochem	Chemical processing	Assumed GE's chemical processing operations
March 1, 1966	ITT Federal Support Services, Inc.	Support services	Assumed
July 1, 1967	Douglas United Nuclear	N Reactor operation	Assumed remainder of GE's reactor operations
September 4, 1967	Atlantic Richfield Hanford Company	Chemical Processing	Replaced Isochem
August 8, 1967	Hanford Environmental Health Foundation	Industrial Medicine	Name change only
February 1, 1970	Westinghouse Hanford Company	Hanford Engineering Development Laboratory	Spun off from PNL with mission to build the Fast Flux Test Facility
September 1971	ARHCO	Support Services	Replaces ITT/PSS
April 1973	United Nuclear Industries, Inc.	All production reactor operations	Name change from Douglas United Nuclear only
January 1, 1975	Energy Research and Development Administration (ERDA)	Lead U.S. Government entity	Replaced AEC – managed site until October 1, 1977
October 1, 1975	Boeing Computer Services (BCS)	Computer services	Replaced CSC
October 1, 1977	U.S. Department of Energy (DOE)	Lead U.S. Government Agency	Replaced ERDA – manages site presently
October 1, 1977	Rockwell Hanford Operations (RHO)	Chemical Processing & Support Services	Replaces ARCHO
June 1981	Braun Hanford Company (BHC)	Architect & Engineering Services	Replaces Vitro
March 1982	Kaiser Engineering Hanford (KEH)	Architect & Engineering Services	Replaces BHC
March 1, 1987	KEH	Construction	Consolidated contract includes former J. A. Jones work
June 29, 1987	WHC	Site management & operations	Consolidated contract includes former RHO, UNC & KEH work.
October 1, 1996	Fluor Daniel Hanford, Inc. (FDH)	Site management & operations	FDH is integrating contractor with 13 subcontracted companies
February 7, 2000	Fluor Hanford	Site cleanup operations	Transition to site cleanup (13 Fluor subcontractors held various roles)
December 11, 2000	Bechtel National, Inc.	Engineering, construction, and commissioning of the Waste Treatment Plant	
October 1, 2008	Ch2M Hill Plateau Remediation Company	Central plateau cleanup and closure	
April 8, 2009	Washington Closure Hanford	River corridor cleanup and closure	
May 26, 2009	Mission Support Alliance	Site infrastructure and services	Consolidated services contract
October 1, 2009	Washington River Protection Solutions	Tank Farm operations	
February 24, 2025	Hanford Tank Waste & Operations Closure (H2C)	Tank Farm operations	Replaces Washington River Protection Solutions

== See also ==
- Lists of nuclear disasters and radioactive incidents
- Timeline of nuclear weapons development
