= 300 Area =

Coordinates: 46°22′10″N 119°16′47″W

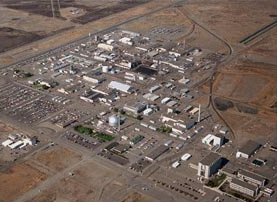

The 300 Area is part of the Hanford Site in the state of Washington, USA. The area was originally used for the production of fuel for nuclear reactors and for performing research on improving the production process, however most modern work being done focuses on environmental research. After a decade of demolition activities, the surplus 300 Area facilities, with the exception of the 324 Blg, have been torn down. Today, the few buildings that remain active are laboratories, workshops, and offices. It is operated by the Pacific Northwest National Laboratory.

The 300 area is a restricted-access area to maintain safety due to industrial use. The soil around the complex in several locations is contaminated as described in the 300 Area final record of decision. There are waste burial grounds to the north with higher level radiation that have had hundreds of thousands of tons of soil removed.

== Closure ==
Fluor Hanford, Inc. began the 300 Area Accelerated Closure Plan in 2000 when re-industrialization failed to grow as expected. Staff were moved from the aging post-World War II era buildings (326, 329) to newly constructed buildings on the Pacific Northwest National Laboratory (PNNL) main campus. By moving in the early 2000s, earlier than the originally planned 2046, the office of science estimates savings of maintaining the outdated facility at $1.5 billion.
