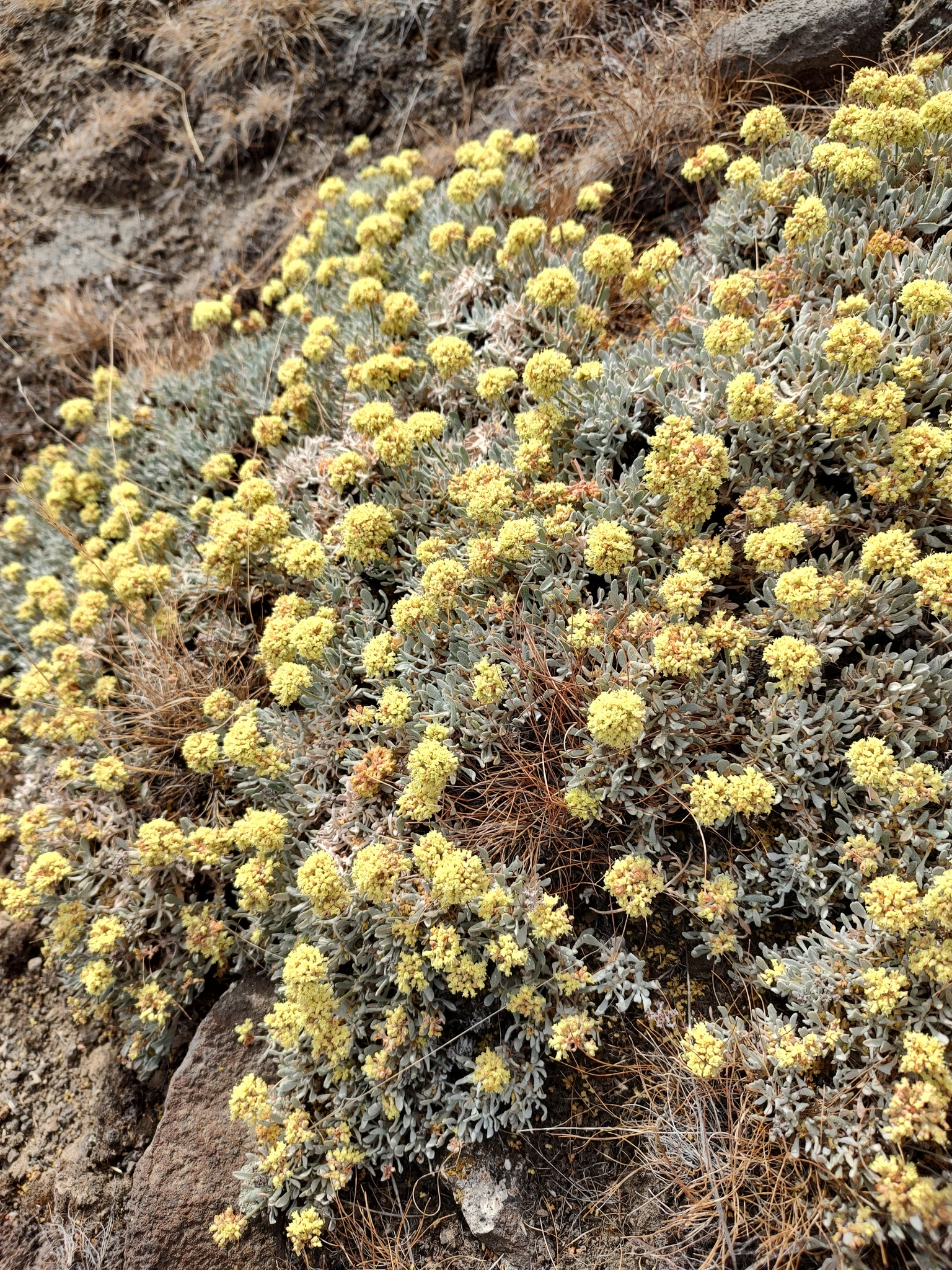

Conservation status
- Critically Imperiled (NatureServe)

Scientific classification
- Kingdom: Plantae
- Clade: Tracheophytes
- Clade: Angiosperms
- Clade: Eudicots
- Order: Caryophyllales
- Family: Polygonaceae
- Genus: Eriogonum
- Species: E. codium

Binomial name
- Eriogonum codium Reveal, Caplow & K. Beck

= Eriogonum codium =

Species of wild buckwheat

Eriogonum codium is a species of wild buckwheat known by the common names basalt desert buckwheat and Umtanum Desert wild buckwheat. It is endemic to Washington in the United States, where it is known only from Hanford Reach National Monument in Benton County. It was discovered in 1995 during an inventory of the biodiversity of the monument and described to science in 1997.

== Description ==
This perennial herb forms a mat of stems around its branching caudex and produces erect flowering stems 2 to 9 centimeters high. The plant is greenish in color and woolly in texture. The densely woolly leaves are up to 1.2 centimeters long. The inflorescences atop the stems contain tiny woolly "lemon yellow" flowers. Flowering occurs in May through August. Analysis of growth rings in the stems of plants reveal that individuals may reach 100 years old or older.

== Distribution and habitat ==
There is only one known population of this plant. As of 2005 it contained 4418 individuals. The population occurs on a rocky ridge 2.5 kilometers long by 30 meters wide. The ridge is composed of a basalt lava flow which is part of the Wanapum Basalt, a geological formation. The plants grow on substrates of basalt with a pumice soil covering. The substrates are exposed and experience harsh conditions with high winds. The habitat is shrubsteppe. Associated plants include Grayia spinosa, Salvia dorrii, Phacelia linearis, Cryptantha pterocarya, Camissonia minor, and Bromus tectorum. Western harvester ants (Pogonomyrmex occidentalis) collect, transport, and apparently consume the seeds of the plant.

== Conservation ==
The main threat to the plant is probably fire. In 1996 a fire at the Yakima Training Center traveled out to the ridge and burned the population. About 800 plants, or 15% of the population, died. It is not a fire-tolerant species. The plant appears to be sensitive to heat, and even unburned, merely singed plants died. In addition, the species apparently does not respond positively to fire events as some plants do, by resprouting from the woody base or producing an abundance of new seedlings. Fire also increases the spread of introduced species of plants such as cheatgrass (Bromus tectorum), and the cover of cheatgrass then increases the likelihood and severity of fire. Firefighting activity may damage the plants.

Other threats include off-road vehicle use and trampling on the open ridge where the plants grow. Some of the plants have died after being crushed. Livestock are also a potential, but not an immediate threat. Rock collecting activity has been noted to occur on the ridge.

This species is a candidate for federal protection.
