= Environmental Restoration Disposal Facility =

Coordinates: 46.5391°N 119.5980°W

The Environmental Restoration Disposal Facility (ERDF) is a waste disposal facility located at the Hanford Nuclear Reservation in Richland, Washington, U.S.. Built in 1996, ERDF collects low-level waste, mixed waste, and other hazardous materials that are generated at Hanford. It does not collect any radioactive waste or other hazardous materials from other sites or the public. The hazardous waste dump was designed to be expanded as needed. The main storage facilities consist of single layer tanks that hold in all more than 17 million tons of nuclear waste. As of 2011, two new super tanks which hold double the amount of the single layer tanks were installed, providing safer levels of radioactivity in the surrounding ground areas and water sheds. Liners were previously installed to collect liquid released by the tanks or rain water that may seep in. The ERDF does not accept liquid waste, but water that seeps into the landfill is treated to keep the surrounding environment safe.

Clean-up of waste is done by clean-up crews around the property. It is trucked to the main facilities to be processed and packaged. At its height there were more than 600 truckloads a day. Since clean-up began, more than 12,000,000 miles have been logged by truck drivers transporting waste containers to the facility. Processing is done by compacting waste and hazardous materials to make sure no air pockets remain. After adding support to the waste by adding cement blocks so the area will not sag, a temporary cap is placed over the waste until a permanent cap seals all the waste off from the site.

== Sources ==
- "Environmental Restoration Disposal Facility - Hanford Site". hanford.gov.
- http://www.hanford.gov/news.cfm/RL/DOE_Marks_20_Years_of_Cleanup_Success_at_ERDF.pdf
