= Dragon reactor =

UK experimental HTR, operated from 1965 to 1976

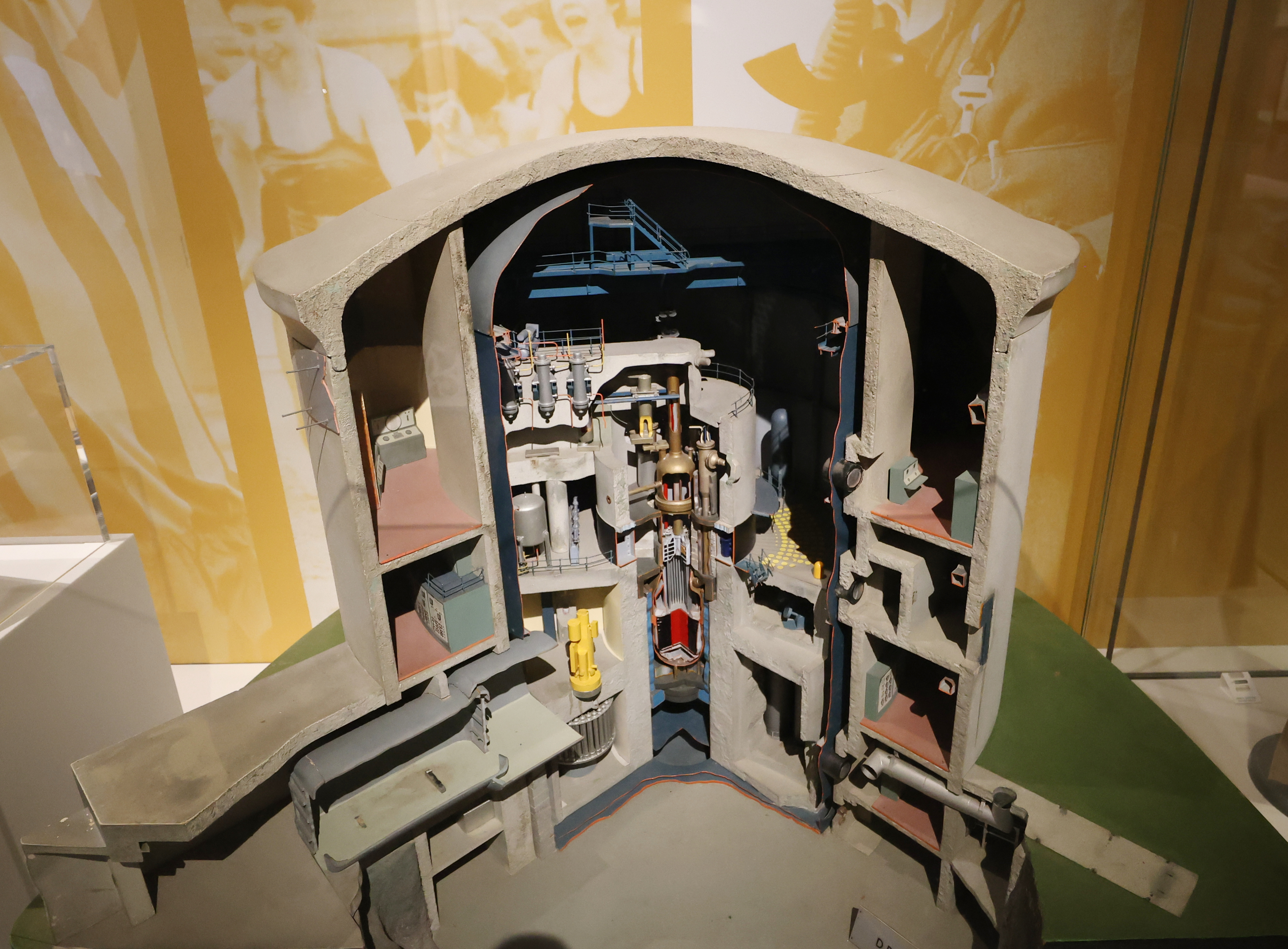
- Cutaway model of the Dragon reactor
- Operating Institution: United Kingdom Atomic Energy Authority
- Location: Winfrith, Dorset, England
- Coordinates: 50.6840°N 2.2694°W
- Type: High-temperature gas reactor
- First Criticality: 1965
- Shutdown date: 1976

Dragon was an experimental high temperature gas-cooled reactor at Winfrith in Dorset, England, operated by the United Kingdom Atomic Energy Authority (UKAEA). Its purpose was to test fuel and materials for the European High Temperature Reactor programme, which was exploring the use of tristructural-isotropic (TRISO) fuel and gas cooling for future high-efficiency reactor designs. The project was built and managed as an Organisation for Economic Co-operation and Development/Nuclear Energy Agency international project. In total, 13 countries were involved in its design and operation during the project lifetime.

Originally conceived as a small research reactor, during the design phase it grew larger. The choice of helium coolant was made after a long debate within the UKAEA between proponents of helium and carbon dioxide, with helium ultimately selected. Groundbreaking occurred in 1960. It operated from 1965 to 1976, and is generally considered extremely successful.

Dragon's construction was followed by similar work in the US, leading ultimately to the much larger Fort Saint Vrain Nuclear Power Plant. This suffered from a number of problems due to corrosion and the customer soured on the design. Contracts for similar models in the US that were being signed were cancelled, and although Dragon suffered none of these issues, no orders were forthcoming in Europe either. By this time the market had largely standardized on the pressurized water reactor (PWR) for the large buildout that occurred during the 1970s and 80s, and the decision was made to shut down Dragon.

As of 2023, Dragon is being decommissioned.

== Concept ==
During the 1950s, the tristructural-isotropic (TRISO) fuel concept became an area of significant interest. In this concept, the nuclear fuel is encapsulated in a ceramic material that is capable of sustaining extremely high temperatures. This ensures the fuel remains encapsulated even if the reactor itself is compromised. This also allows the reactor to operate at higher temperatures, which results in higher efficiency.

While the TRISO assembly provides the fuel, a reactor also requires a neutron moderator and a cooling fluid to remove energy as heat. It is here that TRISO reactor designs may differ significantly. In the case of Dragon, the fuel was produced in small spherical pellets and then pressed into larger blocks containing the graphite moderator formed into long hexagonal rods. The resulting blocks were then placed in fixed locations in the reactor. This is known as the "prismatic" design. While the Dragon reactor explored the prismatic design, West Germany developed an alternative concept known as the pebble-bed reactor, where the fuel elements are moved around the reactor.

The choice of cooling gas for the design was highly controversial within the UK establishment. C.A. Rennie favoured the use of helium as it would reduce corrosion issues and had the added advantage of having a very low nuclear cross section which improved the neutron economy and meant the gas would not become highly radioactive over time. At the time, helium was available in the required quantities only from the USA, who classified it as a strategic material and carefully controlled its international sales. Risley Nuclear Laboratories, developing the carbon dioxide (CO_{2}) cooled Advanced Gas-cooled Reactor (AGR), argued that the supply would be a serious issue, while CO_{2}, in spite of any technical downsides, was trivially available. The OEEC team overseeing the project admitted that the helium issue "throw(s) doubt on the feasibility of employing it in an extensive power program."

By the mid-1960s the concerns about helium availability had largely faded, and in 1967 considered a non-issue. By this time the major concern was building a cooling system that was leak-proof enough to contain the gas while still being inexpensive enough to build. The UKAEA, in particular, had already gone ahead with the AGR program and were noting the issues with corrosion due to the CO_{2}, and raised concerns that helium might not be as inert as proponents suggested.

The TRISO design was never widely commercialized. The German designs suffered from a number of problems, and while Dragon operated successfully for many years, declining interest in alternative designs led to its closure without a larger commercial variant being built. As of 2019, these concepts have been used in several further research reactors, including Peach Bottom, AVR, HTTR, and HTR-10 as well as for small-scale commercial reactors, Fort St. Vrain and THTR-300. The HTR-PM in China is under construction, with one unit at Shidao Bay connected to the grid as of December 2021.

== The reactor ==
The Atomic Energy Establishment at Winfrith was built for the construction and operation of experimental and research nuclear reactors. Dragon used helium gas as the coolant and graphite as the neutron moderator. Fuel was formed into tiny spherical pellets and then coated with ceramics. These were then mixed with the graphite and pressed together to form blocks of various shapes and sizes. Criticality is only possible when the blocks are placed together in certain configurations within a neutron reflector, allowing additional fuel to be held in a ready area and loaded on-the-fly. Helium was used due to its low nuclear cross section which led to higher neutron economy, as well as its chemical inertness allowing it to operate at higher temperatures without fear of eroding the reactor materials. Higher temperatures also allow for more efficient steam turbine operation and make it more suitable for direct use as process heat. In the case of a power failure, natural convection of the helium provided emergency cooling. The fuel used in the reactor was coated particles, consisting of micro-pellets of a fissile material (such as U235) surrounded by a ceramic outer layer. Initially most of the fuel was highly enriched uranium (about 93% uranium-235), though later more lower enrichment (about 20%) fuel was used. The reactor resembled an enormous bottle, with the larger area at the bottom containing the active fuel within the reflector, and the smaller area on top holding additional fuel elements for reloading.

== Decommissioning ==
The Winfrith site extended to 129.4 hectares (320 acres) of heathland in rural south Dorset, and nine different experimental reactors were located there.

Of the nine reactors, only the Dragon Reactor and the Steam Generating Heavy Water Reactor remain, and they are in the process of being decommissioned. During decommissioning, the reactor vessels will be placed in reactor safestores, other structures will be dismantled and stored, any remaining waste will be sent to allocated storage sites, and the soil will be removed as necessary to a suitable Low Level Waste Repository. Finally, the site will be declassified as a nuclear licensed site, landscaped and returned to normal use. Decommissioning of the site is being managed by NRS (Nuclear Restoration Services) on behalf of the NDA (Nuclear Decommissioning Authority), and the final decommissioning phase has been deferred for at least twenty years.
