= Generation IV reactor =

New nuclear reactor technologies under development

Generation IV (Gen IV) reactors are nuclear reactor design technologies that are envisioned as successors of generation III reactors. The Generation IV International Forum (GIF) – an international organization that coordinates the development of generation IV reactors – specifically selected six reactor technologies as candidates for generation IV reactors. The designs target improved safety, sustainability, efficiency, and cost. The World Nuclear Association in 2015 suggested that some might enter commercial operation before 2030.

No precise definition of a Generation IV reactor exists. The term refers to nuclear reactor technologies under development as of approximately 2000, and whose designs were intended to represent 'the future shape of nuclear energy', at least at that time. The six designs selected were: the gas-cooled fast reactor (GFR), the lead-cooled fast reactor (LFR), the molten salt reactor (MSR), the sodium-cooled fast reactor (SFR), the supercritical-water-cooled reactor (SCWR) and the very high-temperature reactor (VHTR).

The sodium fast reactor has received the greatest share of funding that supports demonstration facilities. Moir and Teller consider the molten-salt reactor, a less developed technology, as potentially having the greatest inherent safety of the six models. The very-high-temperature reactor designs operate at much higher temperatures than prior generations. This allows for high temperature electrolysis or the sulfur–iodine cycle for the efficient production of hydrogen and the synthesis of carbon-neutral fuels.

The majority of reactors in operation around the world are considered second generation and third generation reactor systems, as the majority of the first generation systems have been retired. China was the first country to operate a demonstration generation-IV reactor, the HTR-PM in Shidaowan, Shandong, which is a pebble-bed type high-temperature gas-cooled reactor. It was connected to the grid in December 2023, making it the world's first Gen IV reactor to enter commercial operation. In 2024, it was reported that China would also build the world's first thorium molten salt nuclear power station, scheduled to be operational by 2029.

== Generation IV International Forum ==
The Generation IV International Forum (GIF) is an international organization with its stated goal being "the development of concepts for one or more Generation IV systems that can be licensed, constructed, and operated in a manner that will provide a competitively priced and reliable supply of energy ... while satisfactorily addressing nuclear safety, waste, proliferation and public perception concerns." It coordinates the development of GEN IV technologies. It has been instrumental in coordinating research into the six types of Generation IV reactors, and in defining the scope and meaning of the term itself.

As of 2021, active members include: Australia, Canada, China, the European Atomic Energy Community (Euratom), France, Japan, Russia, South Africa, South Korea, Switzerland, the United Kingdom and the United States. Non-active members include Argentina and Brazil.

The Forum was initiated in January 2000 by the Office of Nuclear Energy of the U.S. Department of Energy's (DOE) "as a co-operative international endeavour seeking to develop the research necessary to test the feasibility and performance of fourth generation nuclear systems, and to make them available for industrial deployment by 2030."

In November 2013, a brief overview of the reactor designs and activities by each forum member was made available. An update of the technology roadmap which details R&D objectives for the next decade was published in January 2014.

In May 2019, Terrestrial Energy, the Canadian developer of a molten salt reactor, became the first private company to join GIF.

At the forum's October 2021 meeting, the members agreed to create a task force on non-electric applications of nuclear heat, including district and industrial heat applications, desalination and large-scale hydrogen production.

== Timelines ==
The GIF Forum has introduced development timelines for each of the six systems. Research and development is divided into three phases:

- Viability: test basic concepts under relevant conditions; identify and resolve all "potential technical show-stoppers";
- Performance: verify and optimise "engineering-scale processes, phenomena and materials capabilities" under prototypical conditions;
- Demonstration: complete and license the detailed design and carry out construction and operation of prototype or demonstration systems.

In 2000, GIF stated, "After the performance phase is complete for each system, at least six years and several US$ billion will be required for detailed design and construction of a demonstration system." In the Roadmap update of 2013, the performance and demonstration phases were considerably shifted to later dates, while no targets for the commercialisation phases are set. According to the GIF in 2013, "It will take at least two or three decades before the deployment of commercial Gen IV systems."

== Reactor types ==
Many reactor types were considered initially; the list was then refined to focus on the most promising technologies. Three systems are nominally thermal reactors and three are fast reactors. The very high temperature reactor (VHTR) potentially can provide high quality process heat. Fast reactors offer the possibility of burning actinides to further reduce waste and can breed more fuel than they consume. These systems offer significant advances in sustainability, safety and reliability, economics, proliferation resistance, and physical protection.

=== Thermal reactors ===
A thermal reactor is a nuclear reactor that uses slow or thermal neutrons. A neutron moderator is used to slow the neutrons emitted by fission to make them more likely to be captured by the fuel.

==== Very-high-temperature reactor (VHTR) ====
Very-high-temperature reactor

The very-high-temperature reactor (VHTR) uses a graphite-moderated core with a once-through uranium fuel cycle, using helium or molten salt. This reactor design envisions an outlet temperature of 1,000 °C. The reactor core can be either a prismatic-block or a pebble bed reactor design. The high temperatures enable applications such as process heat or hydrogen production via the thermochemical sulfur-iodine cycle process.

In 2012, as part of its next generation nuclear plant competition, Idaho National Laboratory approved a design similar to Areva's prismatic block Antares reactor to be deployed as a prototype by 2021.

In January 2016, X-energy was provided a five-year grant of up to $40 million by the United States Department of Energy to advance their reactor development. The Xe-100 is a modular, helium-cooled pebble-bed reactor, based on the South African PBMR, that would generate 80 MW_{e}, or 320 MW_{e} in a 'four-pack'.

Since 2021, the Chinese government is operating a demonstration HTR-PM 200-MW high temperature pebble bed reactor as a successor to its HTR-10.

==== Molten-salt reactor (MSR) ====
Molten Salt Reactor (MSR)

A molten salt reactor (MSR) is a type of reactor where the primary coolant or the fuel itself is a molten salt mixture. It operates at high temperature and low pressure.

Molten salt can be used for thermal, epithermal and fast reactors. Since 2005 the focus has been on fast spectrum MSRs (MSFR).

Other designs include integral molten salt reactors (e.g. IMSR) and molten chloride salt fast reactors (MCSFR).

Early thermal spectrum concepts and many current ones rely on uranium tetrafluoride (UF_{4}) or thorium tetrafluoride (ThF_{4}), dissolved in molten fluoride salt. The fluid reaches criticality by flowing into a core with a graphite moderator. The fuel may be dispersed in a graphite matrix. These designs are more accurately termed an epithermal reactor than a thermal reactor due to the higher average speed of the neutrons that cause the fission events.

MCSFR does away with the graphite moderator. They achieve criticality using a sufficient volume of salt and fissile material. They can consume much more of the fuel and leave only short-lived waste.

Most MSR designs are derived from the 1960s Molten-Salt Reactor Experiment (MSRE). Variants include the conceptual dual fluid reactor that uses lead as a cooling medium with molten salt fuel, commonly a metal chloride, e.g. plutonium(III) chloride, to aid in greater closed-fuel cycle capabilities. Other notable approaches include the stable salt reactor (SSR) concept, which encases the molten salt in the well-established fuel rods of conventional reactors. This latter design was found to be the most competitive by consultancy firm Energy Process Development in 2015.

Another design under development is TerraPower's molten chloride fast reactor. This concept mixes the liquid natural uranium and molten chloride coolant in the reactor core, reaching very high temperatures at atmospheric pressure. In 2025, the Molten Chloride Reactor Experiment (MCRE), a joint project between Idaho National Labs (INL), Southern Company and TerraPower, achieved a major milestone, when a prototype furnace created a fuel based on denatured uranium at the rate of 18 kg (40 lb) per batch. It further completed a Molten Salt Flow Loop Test Bed, using stainless steel containing a slurry of lithium chloride-potassium chloride salts. Slurry properties such as temperature can be adjusted while the salts circulate. Five sensors analyze factors such as surface tension, fluid density, corrosion, and heat transfer rates.

Another notable MSR feature is the possibility of a thermal spectrum nuclear waste-burner. Conventionally only fast spectrum reactors have been considered viable for utilization or reduction of the spent nuclear fuel. Thermal waste-burning was achieved by replacing a fraction of the uranium in the spent nuclear fuel with thorium. The net production rate of transuranic elements (e.g. plutonium and americium) is below the consumption rate, thus reducing the nuclear storage problem, without the nuclear proliferation concerns and other technical issues associated with a fast reactor.

==== Supercritical-water-cooled reactor (SCWR) ====
Supercritical-water-cooled reactor (SCWR)

The supercritical water reactor (SCWR) is a reduced moderation water reactor concept. Because the average speed of the fission-causing neutrons within the fuel is faster than thermal neutrons, it is more accurately termed an epithermal reactor than a thermal reactor. It uses supercritical water as the working fluid. SCWRs are basically light water reactors (LWR) operating at higher pressure and temperatures with a direct, once-through heat exchange cycle. As commonly envisioned, it would operate on a direct cycle, much like a boiling water reactor (BWR). Since it uses supercritical water (not to be confused with critical mass) as the working fluid, it would have only one water phase. This makes the heat exchange method more similar to a pressurized water reactor (PWR). It could operate at much higher temperatures than both current PWRs and BWRs.

Supercritical water-cooled reactors (SCWRs) offer high thermal efficiency (i.e., about 45% vs. about 33% efficiency for current LWRs) and considerable simplification.

The mission of the SCWR is generation of low-cost electricity. It is built upon two proven technologies, LWRs, the most commonly deployed power generating reactors, and superheated fossil fuel fired boilers, also in wide use. 32 organizations in 13 countries are investigating the concept.

SCWRs share the steam explosion and radioactive steam release hazards of BWRs and LWRs as well as the need for extremely expensive heavy duty pressure vessels, pipes, valves, and pumps. These shared problems are inherently more severe for SCWRs due to their higher temperatures.

One SCWR design under development is the VVER-1700/393 (VVER-SCWR or VVER-SKD) – a Russian SCWR with double-inlet-core and a breeding ratio of 0.95.

=== Fast reactors ===
A fast reactor directly uses fission neutrons without moderation. Fast reactors can be configured to "burn", or fission, all actinides, and given enough time, therefore drastically reduce the actinides fraction in spent nuclear fuel produced by the present world fleet of thermal neutron light water reactors, thus closing the fuel cycle. Alternatively, if configured differently, they can breed more actinide fuel than they consume.

==== Gas-cooled fast reactor (GFR) ====
Gas-cooled fast reactor (GFR)

The gas-cooled fast reactor (GFR) features a fast-neutron spectrum and closed fuel cycle. The reactor is helium-cooled. Its outlet temperature is 850 °C. It moves the very-high-temperature reactor (VHTR) to a more sustainable fuel cycle. It uses a direct Brayton cycle gas turbine for high thermal efficiency. Several fuel forms are under consideration: composite ceramic fuel, advanced fuel particles, or ceramic-clad actinide compounds. Core configurations involve pin- or plate-based fuel assemblies or prismatic blocks.

The European Sustainable Nuclear Industrial Initiative provided funding for three Generation IV reactor systems:

- Allegro: a 100 MW_{t} gas-cooled fast reactor, planned for central or eastern Europe. The central European Visegrád Group are pursuing the technology.
- GoFastR: In 2013 German, British, and French institutes finished a 3-year collaboration study on the follow-on industrial scale design. They were funded by the EU's 7th FWP framework programme, with the goal of making a sustainable VHTR.

==== Sodium-cooled fast reactor (SFR) ====
Pool design sodium-cooled fast reactor (SFR)

Sodium-cooled fast reactors (SCFRs) have been operated in multiple countries since the 1980s.

The two largest experimental sodium cooled fast reactors are in Russia, the BN-600 and the BN-800 (880 MWe gross). These NPPs are being used to provide operating experience and technological solutions that will be applied to the construction of the BN-1200 (OKBM Afrikantov first Gen IV reactor). The largest ever operated was the French Superphenix reactor at over 1200 MW_{e}, successfully operating before decommissioning in 1996. In India, the Fast Breeder Test Reactor (FBTR) reached criticality in October 1985. In September 2002, fuel burn up efficiency in the FBTR for the first time reached the 100,000 megawatt-days per metric ton uranium (MWd/MTU) mark. This is considered an important milestone in Indian breeder reactor technology. Using that experience, the Prototype Fast Breeder Reactor, a 500 MWe Sodium cooled fast reactor is being built at a cost of INR 5,677 crores (~US$900 million) which achieved criticality in April 2026. The PFBR is to be followed by six more Commercial Fast Breeder Reactors (CFBRs) of 600 MW_{e} each.

The Gen IV SFR is a project that builds on the oxide fueled fast breeder reactor and the metal fueled integral fast reactor. Its goals are to increase the efficiency of uranium usage by breeding plutonium and eliminating transuranic isotopes. The reactor design uses an unmoderated core running on fast neutrons, designed to allow any transuranic isotope to be consumed (and in some cases used as fuel). SFR fuel expands when the reactor overheats, automatically slowing down the chain reaction, making it passively safe.

One SFR reactor concept is cooled by liquid sodium and fueled by a metallic alloy of uranium and plutonium or spent nuclear fuel, the nuclear waste of light water reactors. The SFR fuel is contained in steel cladding. Liquid sodium fills the space between the clad elements that make up the fuel assembly. One of the design challenges is the risks of handling sodium, which reacts explosively if it comes into contact with water. The use of liquid metal instead of water as coolant allows the system to work at atmospheric pressure, reducing the risk of leakage.

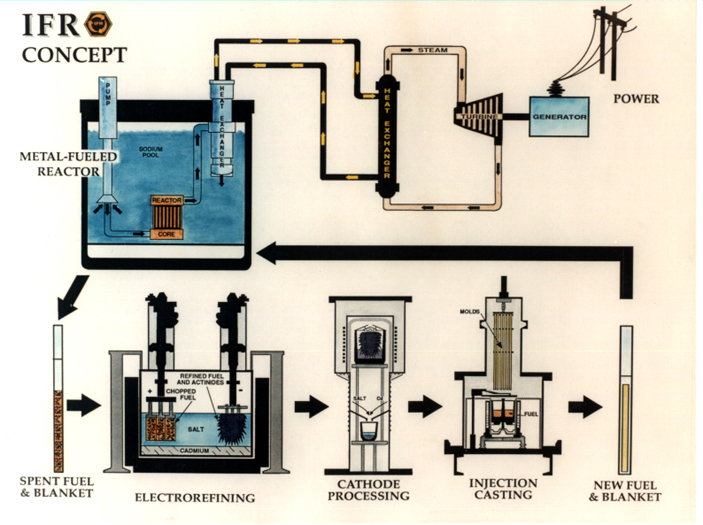
The sustainable fuel-cycle proposed in the 1990s integral fast reactor concept (color), an animation of the pyroprocessing technology is also available.

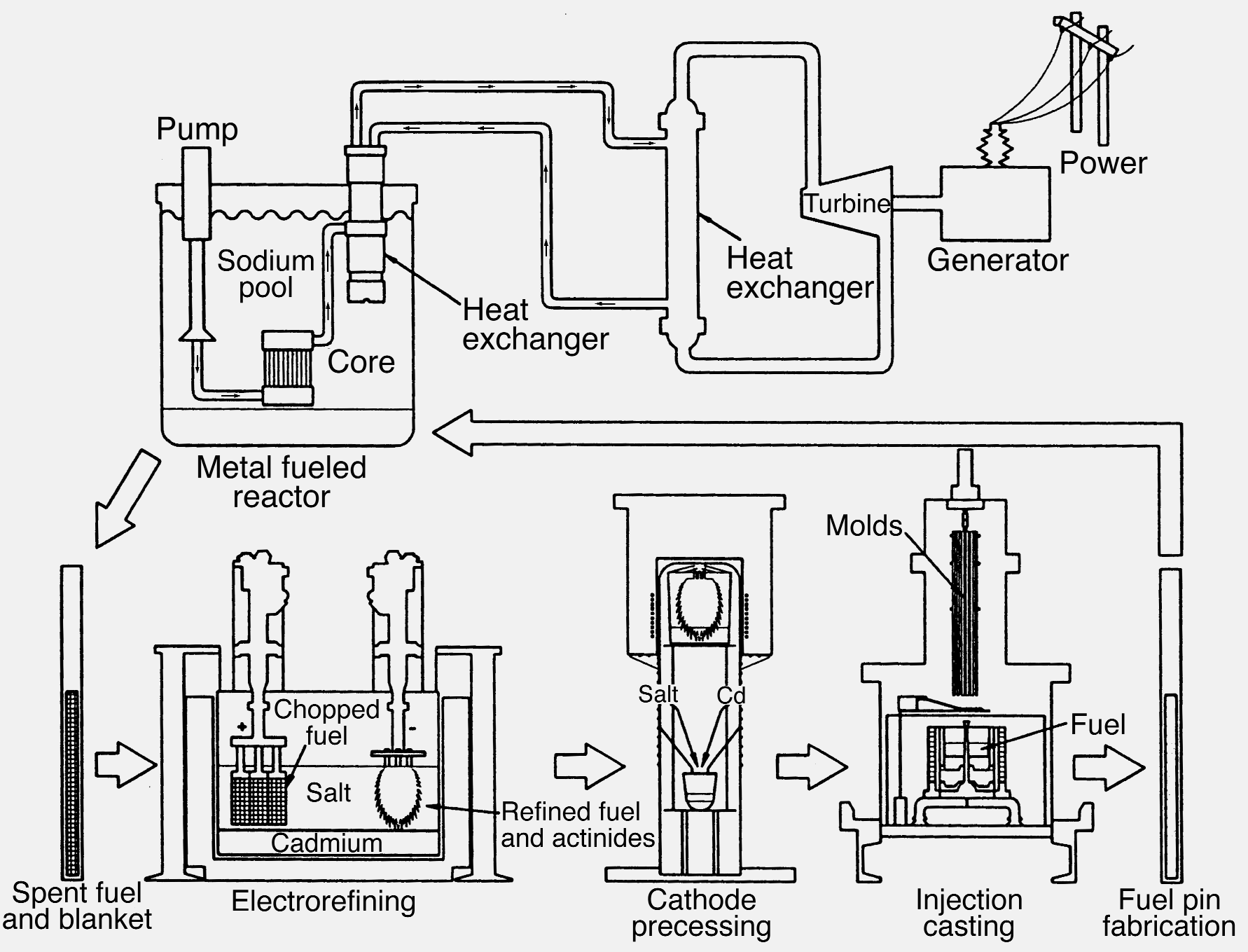
IFR concept (black and white with clearer text)

The European Sustainable Nuclear Industrial Initiative funded three Generation IV reactor systems. Advanced Sodium Technical Reactor for Industrial Demonstration (ASTRID) was a sodium-cooled fast reactor, that was cancelled in August 2019.

Numerous progenitors of the Gen IV SFR exist. The 400 MW_{t} Fast Flux Test Facility operated for ten years at Hanford; the 20 MW_{e} EBR II operated for over thirty years at Idaho National Laboratory, but was shut down in 1994.

GE Vernova Hitachi's PRISM reactor is a modernized and commercial implementation of the Integral Fast Reactor (IFR), developed by Argonne National Laboratory between 1984 and 1994. The primary purpose of PRISM is burning up spent nuclear fuel from other reactors, rather than breeding new fuel. The design reduces the half-lives of the fissionable elements present in spent nuclear fuel while generating electricity largely as a byproduct.

==== Lead-cooled fast reactor (LFR) ====
Lead-cooled fast reactor

The lead-cooled fast reactor (LFR) features a fast-neutron-spectrum lead or lead/bismuth eutectic (LBE) coolant with a closed fuel cycle. Proposals include a small 50 to 150 MW_{e} that features a long refueling interval, a modular system rated at 300 to 400 MW_{e}, and a large monolithic plant at 1,200 MW_{e}. The fuel is metal or nitride-based containing fertile uranium and transuranics. The reactor is cooled by natural convection with a reactor outlet coolant temperature of 550-800 °C. The higher temperature enables the production of hydrogen by thermochemical processes.

The European Sustainable Nuclear Industrial Initiative is funding a 100 MW_{t} LFR, an accelerator-driven sub-critical reactor called MYRRHA. It is to be built in Belgium with construction expected by 2036. A reduced-power model called Guinevere was started up at Mol in March 2009 and became operational in 2012.

Construction of BREST-OD-300 has started on June 8th 2021. It is expected to start operation in 2026.

== Assessment ==
The GEN IV Forum reframes the reactor safety paradigm, from accepting that nuclear accidents can occur and should be mastered, to eliminating the physical possibility of an accident. Active and passive safety systems would be at least as effective as those of Generation III systems and render the most severe accidents physically impossible.

Relative to Gen II-III, advantages of Gen IV reactors include:

- Nuclear waste that remains radioactive for a few centuries instead of millennia
- 100–300x energy yield from the same amount of nuclear fuel
- Broader range of fuels, including unencapsulated raw fuels (non-pebble MSR, LFTR).
- Potential to burn existing nuclear waste and produce electricity: a closed fuel cycle.
- Improved safety via features such as ambient pressure operation, automatic passive reactor shutdown, and alternate coolants.

A specific risk of the SFR is related to using metallic sodium as a coolant. In case of a breach, sodium explosively reacts with water. Argon is used to prevent sodium oxidation. Argon can displace oxygen in the air and can pose hypoxia concerns for workers. This was a factor at the loop type Prototype Fast Breeder Reactor Monju at Tsuruga, Japan. Using lead or molten salt coolants mitigates this problem as they are less reactive and have a high freezing temperature and ambient pressure. Lead has much higher viscosity, much higher density, lower heat capacity, and more radioactive neutron activation products than sodium.

Multiple proof of concept Gen IV designs have been built. For example, the reactors at Fort St. Vrain Generating Station and HTR-10 are similar to the proposed Gen IV VHTR designs, and the pool type EBR-II, Phénix, BN-600 and BN-800 reactor are similar to the proposed pool type Gen IV SFR designs.

Nuclear engineer David Lochbaum cautions, "the problem with new reactors and accidents is twofold: scenarios arise that are impossible to plan for in simulations; and humans make mistakes". As one director of a U.S. research laboratory put it, "fabrication, construction, operation, and maintenance of new reactors will face a steep learning curve: advanced technologies will have a heightened risk of accidents and mistakes. The technology may be proven, but people are not".

== Design projects ==
Summary of designs for Gen IV reactors
Type	Neutron spectrum	Coolant	Temperature (°C)	Fuel cycle	Size (MW)	Example developers
VHTR	Thermal	Helium	900–1000	Open	250–300	JAEA (HTTR), Tsinghua University (HTR-10), Tsinghua University & China Nuclear Engineering Corporation (HTR-PM), X-energy
SFR	Fast	Sodium	550	Closed	30–150, 300–1500, 1000–2000	TerraPower (Natrium, TWR), Toshiba (4S), GE Vernova Hitachi Nuclear Energy (PRISM), OKBM Afrikantov (BN-1200), China National Nuclear Corporation (CNNC) (CFR-600), Indira Gandhi Centre for Atomic Research (Prototype Fast Breeder Reactor)
SCWR	Thermal or fast	Water or Sodium	510–625	Open or closed	300–700, 1000–1500	VVER-1700/393 (VVER-SCWR or VVER-SKD)
GFR	Fast	Helium	850	Closed	1200	Energy Multiplier Module
LFR	Fast	Lead	480–800	Closed	20–180, 300–1200, 600–1000	BREST-OD-300, MYRRHA, SEALER
MSR	Fast or thermal	Fluoride or chloride salts	700–800	Closed	250–1000	Seaborg Technologies, TerraPower, Elysium Industries, Thorizon, Moltex Energy, Flibe Energy (LFTR), Copenhagen Atomics, Thorium Tech Solution (FUJI MSR), Terrestrial Energy (IMSR), Southern Company, ThorCon

== Radiation resistant materials ==
Development of generation IV fission reactors has sparked significant interest in emerging radiation resistant materials. Structural materials and fuel cladding are integral to extending plant operating lifetime and safety. Since the discovery of the High-entropy alloy, these materials have been thoroughly investigated as a next generation nuclear power plant structural material. Chemically complex alloys and ceramics (see High entropy oxide) such as high entropy carbide ceramics possess increased radiation resistance due to their unique electronic properties and atomic level heterogeneity. Chemical disorder and local lattice distortion have been proposed as mechanisms for improved radiation resistance, as well as increasing strength up to temperatures well above the relatively high operating temperatures of gen. IV reactors. High entropy alloys and ceramics have been demonstrated experimentally to possess low irradiation-induced swelling, resist void formation and subsequent helium bubble growth, and minimize other irradiation hardening and embrittlement effects.

Although extremely promising as next generation nuclear reactor materials, high-entropy materials and specifically high-entropy ceramics are still in their infancy. The inherent chemical complexity of these materials offers limitless possibilities in terms of design and property modification, but complicates design paths. Limited study of irradiation resistance and creep strength on timescales relevant to reactor applications constrains high-entropy material scale up. A greater underlying understanding of nanometer-scale material properties is necessary; thus, these materials are likely to undergo significant research and development before scale up in generation IV or generation V reactors. Ongoing research at the basic material level includes studies of atomic level segregation at grain boundaries, defect migration rates, irradiation resistance at greater timescales, and further characterization of embrittlement and other material failure points as they compare to the standard ferritic-martensitic steels commonly used in gen. III reactor structural materials.

== See also ==
- List of small modular reactor designs
- Nuclear reactor
- Nuclear material
- Nuclear physics
- List of reactor types
- Generation II reactor
- Generation III reactor
- Integral fast reactor
- Stable salt reactor
- Liquid fluoride thorium reactor
- Breeder reactor
- Small modular reactor
- List of nuclear reactors

== Bibliography ==
- Dunlap, Richard A. (2024). Generation IV Nuclear Reactors: Design, operation and prospects for future energy production. Bristol, UK: IOP Publishing. doi:10.1088/978-0-7503-6069-2. ISBN 978-0-7503-6067-8.
- Schulenberg, Thomas (2022). The fourth generation of nuclear reactors: Fundamentals, Types, and Benefits Explained (1st ed.). Heidelberg: Springer. pp. XV, 183. doi:10.1007/978-3-662-64919-0. ISBN 978-3-662-64919-0.
- Pioro, Igor, ed. (2022). Handbook of Generation IV Nuclear Reactors: A Guidebook (2nd ed.). Woodhead Publishing. p. 1098. ISBN 978-0-12-822653-7.
