= High-temperature gas-cooled reactor =

Type of nuclear reactor that operates at high temperatures as part of normal operation

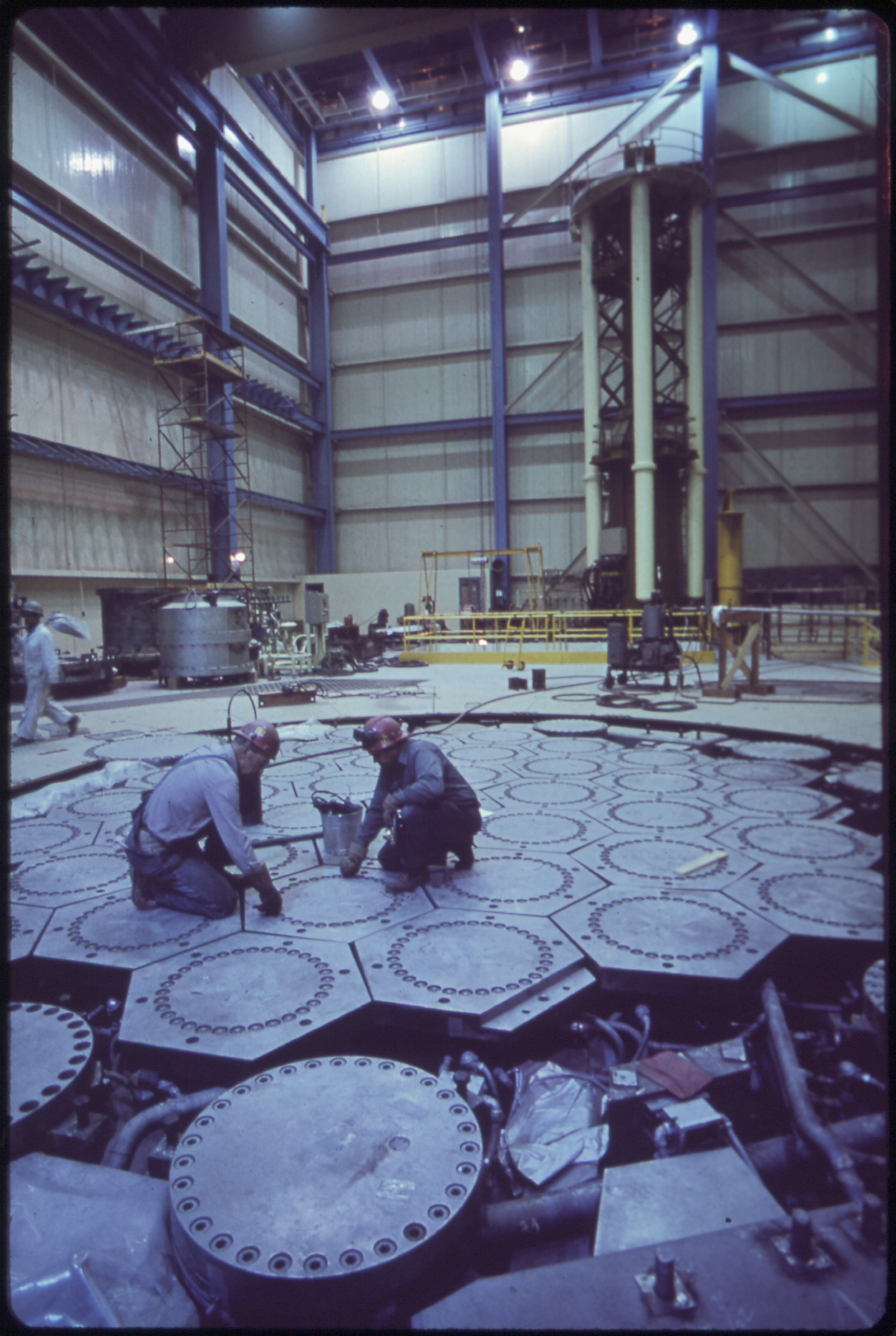
Refueling floor at Fort Saint Vrain HTGR, 1972

A high-temperature gas-cooled reactor (HTGR) is a type of gas-cooled nuclear reactor which uses uranium fuel and graphite moderation to produce very high reactor core output temperatures. (700 to 950 °C) All existing HTGR reactors use helium coolant. The reactor core can be either a "prismatic block" (reminiscent of a conventional reactor core) or a "pebble-bed" core. China Huaneng Group currently operates HTR-PM, a 250 MW HTGR power plant with two pebble-bed HTGRs, in Shandong province, China.

The high operating temperatures of HTGR reactors potentially enable applications such as process heat or hydrogen production via the thermochemical sulfur–iodine cycle. A proposed development of the HTGR is the Generation IV very-high-temperature reactor (VHTR).

== History ==
The use of a high-temperature, gas-cooled reactor for power production was proposed in 1944 by Farrington Daniels, then associate director of the chemistry division at the University of Chicago's Metallurgical Laboratory. Initially, Daniels envisaged a reactor using beryllium moderator. Development of this high temperature design proposal continued at the Power Pile Division of the Clinton Laboratories (known now as Oak Ridge National Laboratory) until 1947. Professor Rudolf Schulten in Germany also played a role in development during the 1950s. Peter Fortescue, whilst at General Atomics, was leader of the team responsible for the initial development of the High temperature gas-cooled reactor (HTGR), as well as the Gas-cooled fast reactor (GCFR) system.

The United States' Peach Bottom Unit 1 was the first HTGR to produce electricity, and did so very successfully, with operation from 1966 through 1974 as a technology demonstrator. Fort St. Vrain Generating Station was one example of this design that operated as an HTGR from 1979 to 1989. Though the reactor was beset by some problems which led to its decommissioning due to economic factors, it served as proof of the HTGR concept in the United States (though no new commercial HTGRs have been developed there since).

Experimental HTGRs have also existed in the United Kingdom (the Dragon reactor) and Germany (AVR reactor and THTR-300), and currently exist in Japan (the High-temperature engineering test reactor using prismatic fuel with 30 MW_{th} of capacity) and China (the HTR-10, a pebble-bed design with 10 MW_{e} of generation). Two full-scale pebble-bed HTGRs, the HTR-PM reactors, each with 100 MW of electrical production capacity, have gone operational in China as of 2021.

== Reactor design ==
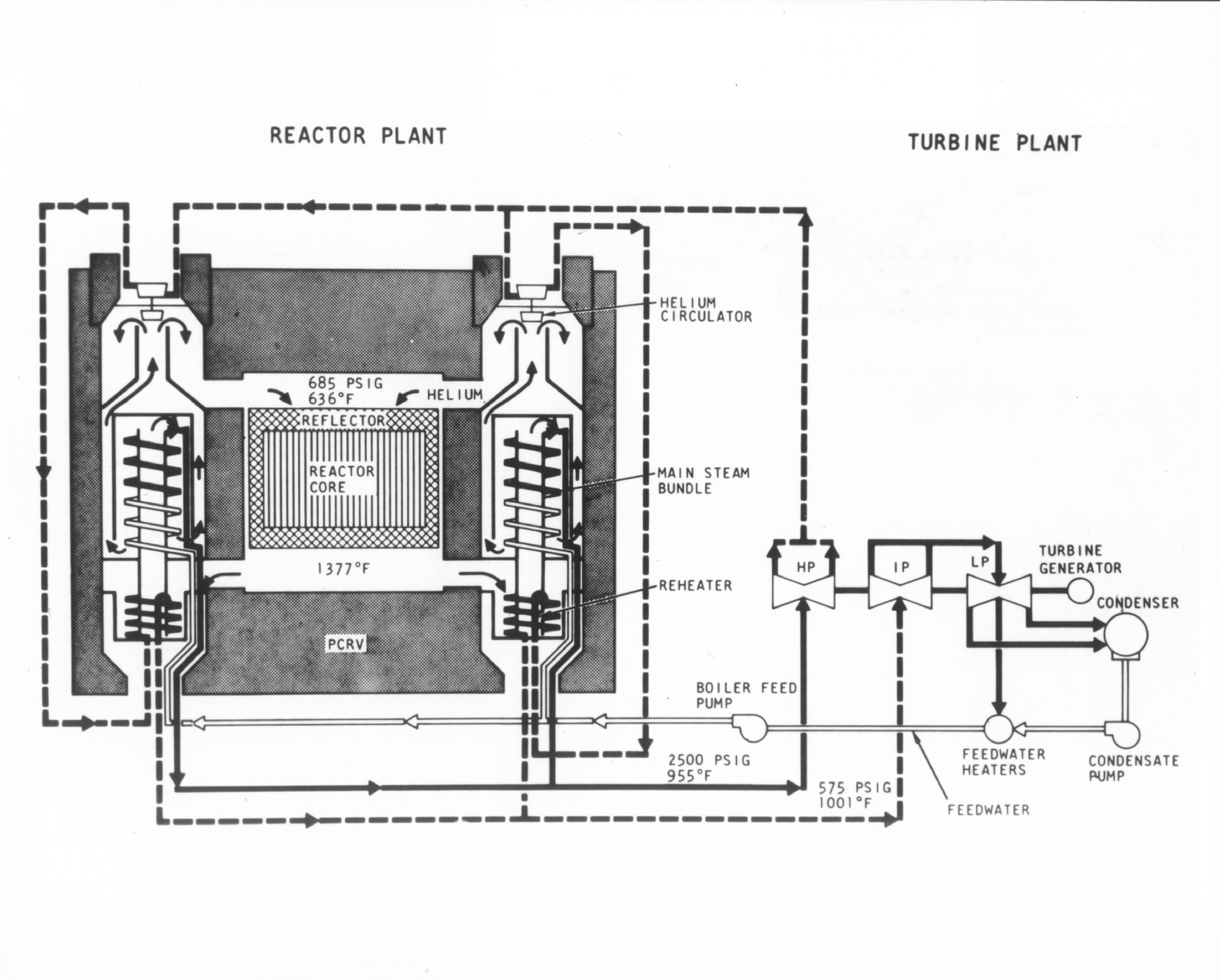
A simplified flow diagram of a 1,100 MWe HTGR.

=== Neutron moderator ===
The neutron moderator is graphite, although whether the reactor core is configured in graphite prismatic blocks or in graphite pebbles depends on the HTGR design.

=== Nuclear fuel ===
The fuel used in HTGRs is coated fuel particles, such as TRISO fuel particles. Coated fuel particles have fuel kernels, usually made of uranium dioxide, however, uranium carbide or uranium oxycarbide are also possibilities. Uranium oxycarbide combines uranium carbide with the uranium dioxide to reduce the oxygen stoichiometry. Less oxygen may lower the internal pressure in the TRISO particles caused by the formation of carbon monoxide, due to the oxidization of the porous carbon layer in the particle. The TRISO particles are either dispersed in a pebble for the pebble bed design or molded into compacts/rods that are then inserted into the hexagonal graphite blocks.

=== Coolant ===
Helium has been the coolant used in all HTGRs to date. Helium is an inert gas, so it will generally not chemically react with any material. Additionally, exposing helium to neutron radiation does not make it radioactive, unlike most other possible coolants.

=== Control ===
In the prismatic designs, control rods are inserted in holes cut in the graphite blocks that make up the core. The VHTR will be controlled like current PBMR designs if it utilizes a pebble bed core, the control rods will be inserted in the surrounding graphite reflector. Control can also be attained by adding pebbles containing neutron absorbers.

== Safety features and other benefits ==
The design takes advantage of the inherent safety characteristics of a helium-cooled, graphite-moderated core with specific design optimizations. The graphite has large thermal inertia and the helium coolant is single phase, inert, and has no reactivity effects. The core is composed of graphite, has a high heat capacity and structural stability even at high temperatures. The fuel is coated uranium-oxycarbide which permits high burn-up (approaching 200 GWd/t) and retains fission products. The high average core-exit temperature of the VHTR (1,000 °C) permits emissions-free production of high grade process heat. Reactors are designed for 60 years of service.

== List of HTGR reactors ==
=== Constructed reactors ===
As of 2011, a total of seven HTGR reactors have been constructed and operated. A further two HTGR reactors were brought on-line at China's HTR-PM site, in 2021/22.

Facility name	Country	Commissioned	Shutdown	No. of reactors	Fuel type	Outlet temperature (°C)	Thermal power (MW)
Dragon reactor	United Kingdom	1965	1976	1	Prismatic	750	21.5
Peach Bottom	United States	1967	1974	1	Prismatic	700–726	115
AVR	Germany	1967	1988	1	Pebble bed	950	46
Fort Saint Vrain	United States	1979	1989	1	Prismatic	777	842
THTR-300	Germany	1985	1988	1	Pebble bed	750	750
HTTR	Japan	1999	Operational	1	Prismatic	850–950	30
HTR-10	China	2000	Operational	1	Pebble bed	700	10
HTR-PM	China	2021	Operational	2	Pebble bed	750	250
HTGR (Lianyungang)	China	Under construction		1	?		660

Additionally, from 1969 to 1971, the 3 MW Ultra-High Temperature Reactor Experiment (UHTREX) was operated by Los Alamos National Laboratory to develop the technology of high-temperature gas-cooled reactors. In UHTREX, unlike HTGR reactors, helium coolant contacted nuclear fuel directly, reaching temperatures in excess of 1300 °C.

=== Proposed designs ===
- Pebble Bed Modular Reactor (1994) – reactor proposed for Koeberg Nuclear Power Station, South Africa
- Gas turbine modular helium reactor (1997) – proposed reactor with gas turbine power conversion
- Next Generation Nuclear Plant (2005) – a proposed Generation IV very-high-temperature reactor
- X-energy (2016) – developers of a proposed Generation IV pebble-bed reactor
- U-Battery (2020) – a micro–small modular reactor design effort, discontinued in 2023
- Kaleidos reactor (2020) – a microreactor proposed by Radiant Nuclear
