= Rudolf Schulten =

German physicist (1923–1996)

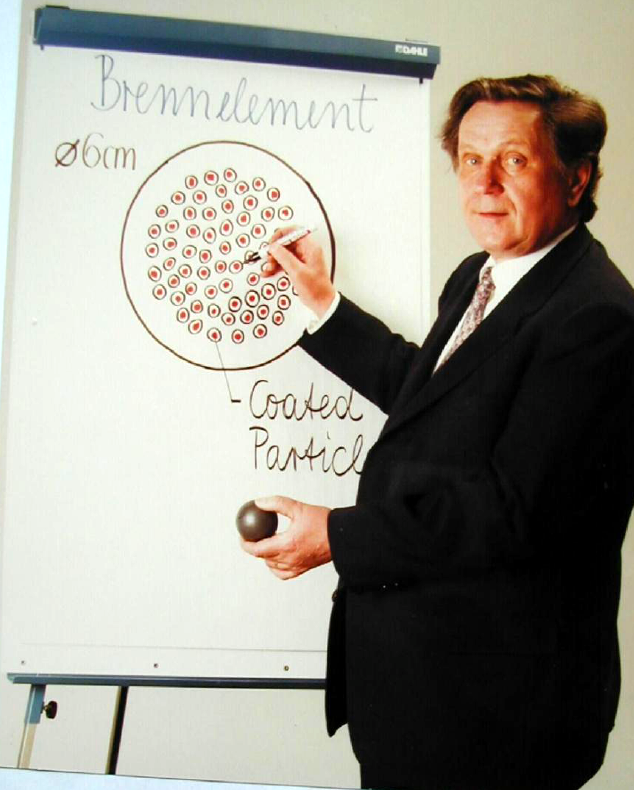
- Rudolf Schulten
- Born: August 16, 1923; Südlohn
- Died: April 27, 1996 (aged 72); Aachen
- Known for: the main developer of the pebble bed reactor design
- Awards: Otto Hahn Prize(1972); Werner von Siemens Ring(1987)
- Scientific career
- Fields: Physicist
- Doctoral advisor: Werner Heisenberg

Rudolf Schulten (16 August 1923 – 27 April 1996) was a German physicist who was professor at RWTH Aachen University and the main developer of the pebble bed reactor design, which was originally invented by Farrington Daniels. Schulten's concept compacts silicon carbide-coated uranium granules into hard, billiard-ball-like graphite spheres to be used as fuel for a new high temperature, helium-cooled type of nuclear reactor.

== AVR reactor ==
The idea took root and in due course a 46 MWth (megawatt thermal) experimental pebble bed reactor (the Arbeitsgemeinschaft Versuchsreaktor, or AVR reactor) was built at the Jülich Research Centre in Jülich, West Germany. It operated for 21 years but was shut down in the wake of Chernobyl, and multiple safety issues.

== HTR-MODUL project ==
Some of the last pebble fuel tested in the AVR was for a low enriched uranium (LEU) fuel cycle anticipated for use in the HTR-MODUL project design by Interatom/SIEMENS.

== South African Pebble Bed Modular Reactor ==
Based on the AVR, South Africa along with international partners developed an updated version called the PBMR. The TRISO fuel elements could use either Thorium or U-235 in the form of LEU as fuel. The project was cancelled in 2010 due to lack of investment, even though the technology has essentially been completely developed.

== HTR-10 China, HTR-PM ==
The technology is currently being developed mainly in China who currently operate a 10 MW test reactor (HTR-10) of this type. The Chinese are, as of 2015, building a commercial pebble-bed reactor: HTR-PM, with two 100MWe reactors. One achieved a sustained chain reaction (criticality) in Sept 2021.
