= EM2 =

The term EM2 may refer to:

== Science and technology ==
- Energy Multiplier Module, a nuclear fission reactor under development by General Atomics
- Exploration Mission-2, a previous name of Artemis II, a planned mission for NASA's Orion spacecraft
- Expression Media 2, Microsoft digital asset management software, a precursor of Phase One Media Pro
- Haplogroup E-M2, an African haplogroup in human DNA
- EM2, a designation for a vacuum tube, of Magic Eye type

== Transport ==
- British Rail Class 77, or Class EM2, an electric locomotive used on the Woodhead electrified railway line
- Embraer EMB 120 Brasilia, abbreviated EM2, a commercial aircraft manufactured in Brazil
- Elias EM-2, a 1920s US military biplane
- Freightliner eM2, an all-electric medium-duty cube truck
- EM2, chassis code for a 2001–2005 Honda Civic coupe
- EM-2, a model of farm tractor by the Greek company Malkotsis

== Other ==
- EM-2 rifle, an experimental British assault rifle
- Epic Mickey 2: The Power of Two, a video game
- EM2, or Electrician's Mate 2nd Class, an enlisted rate in the US Navy and US Coast Guard
- EM2, a category for streaming pupils formerly used in education in Singapore
