= Pebble bed =

Pebble Bed may refer to:

- Gravel, a type of rock
- Pebble-bed reactor, a type of nuclear power plant
