= HTTR =

HTTR may refer to:

- High-temperature engineering test reactor
- Hail to the Redskins
