= Next Generation Nuclear Plant =

Cancelled American reactor project

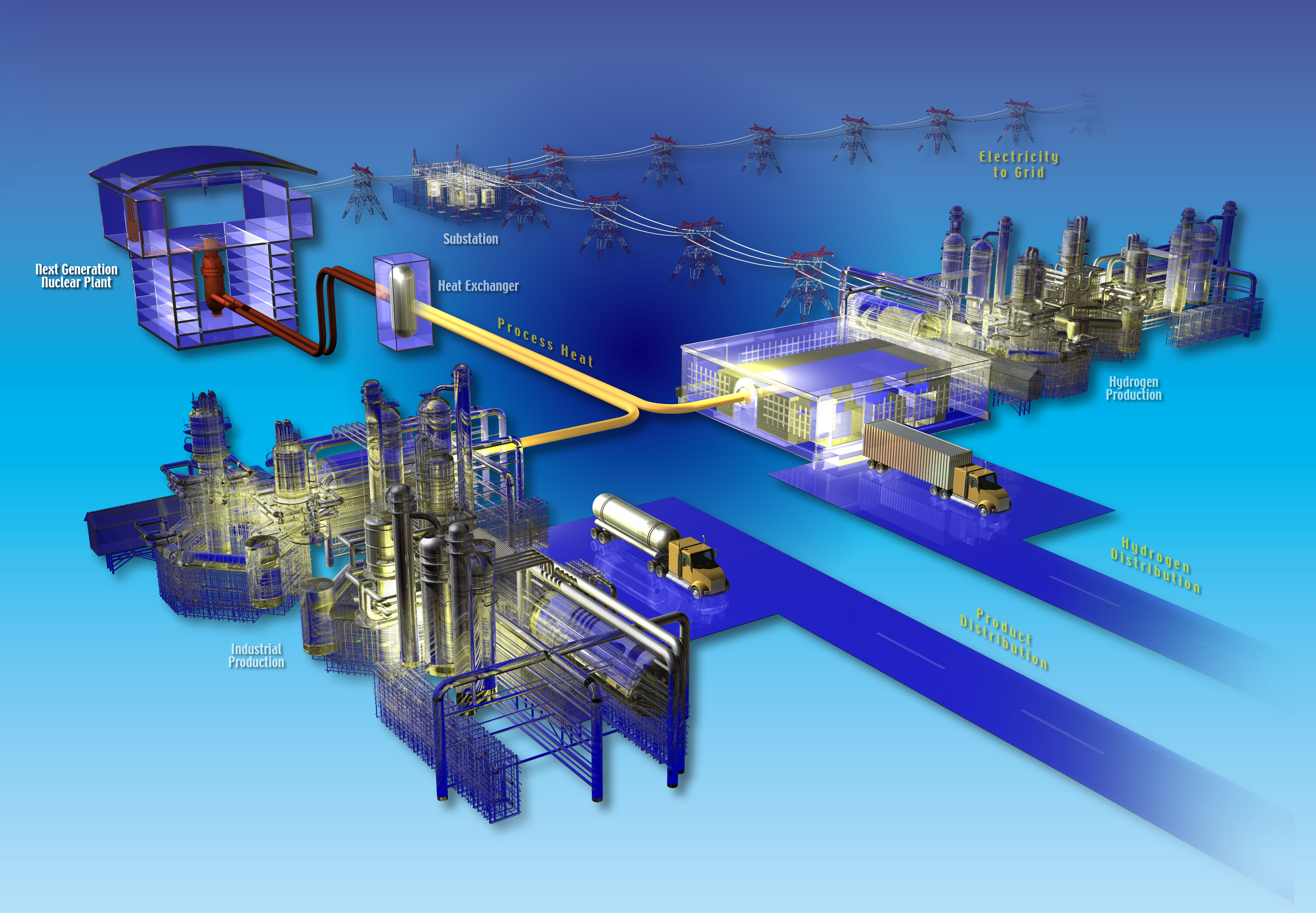
Next generation nuclear plant

A Next Generation Nuclear Plant (NGNP) is a specific proposed generation IV very-high-temperature reactor (VHTR) that could be coupled to a neighboring hydrogen production facility. It could also produce electricity and supply process heat. Up to 30% of this heat could be used to produce hydrogen via high-temperature electrolysis significantly reducing the cost of the process. The envisioned reactor design is helium-cooled, using graphite-moderated thermal neutrons, and TRISO fueled.

The design was developed as a U.S. project from 2005 to 2011, but did not proceed to a detailed design or licensing.

== Next Generation Nuclear Plant Project implementation ==
The NGNP, as a nuclear power facility design, is closely coupled with the United States Department of Energy (DOE) Next Generation Nuclear Plant Project (NGNP Project). The NGNP Project included participation by the DOE, Idaho National Laboratory, and the commercial utilities and reactor designers consortium NGNP Industry Alliance. The United States Nuclear Regulatory Commission (NRC) engaged in pre-licensing interactions with DOE and INL on technical and policy issues that could affect the design and licensing of the NGNP prototype from 2006 until suspension of the effort in 2013. NRC interactions regarding the NGNP were docketed on NRC Docket PROJ0748.

DOE and INL established the NGNP Project as required by Congress in Subtitle C of Title VI of the Energy Policy Act of 2005. The mission of the NGNP Project was to develop, license, build, and operate a prototype modular high temperature gas-cooled reactor (HTGR) plant that would generate high-temperature process heat for use in hydrogen production and other energy-intensive industries while generating electric power at the same time. The hydrogen production aspects of the project were closely aligned with then-President George W. Bush's goals for creating a US-led hydrogen economy. As stipulated by the Energy Policy Act of 2005, pre-licensing activities for the NGNP prototype began with the development of the NGNP Licensing Strategy Report to Congress that was jointly issued by NRC and DOE in August 2008. Subsequent NRC interactions with DOE and INL centered primarily on the NRC's review and assessment of a series of NGNP white paper submittals that describe the approaches that DOE and INL propose to pursue in establishing the technical safety bases and criteria for licensing the NGNP prototype. NGNP pre-licensing interactions began in 2006.

The DOE issued in 2007 a "request for expressions of interest from prospective industry teams" that want to provide design services for developing the NGNP.

With an earlier focus on South Africa's Pebble Bed Modular Reactor (PBMR), in 2012, INL approved a design similar to Areva's SC-HTGR (formerly "Antares") reactor as the chosen next-generation nuclear power plant VHTR to be deployed as a prototype by 2021. It was in competition with General Atomics' gas turbine modular helium reactor and Westinghouse' PBMR. The NGNP Industry Alliance agreed with this technology vendor decision of the AREVA prismatic core modular HTGR in a steam supply configuration for initial applications for co-generation of process heat and electricity.

== Next Generation Nuclear Plant Project termination ==
On October 17, 2011, the Secretary of Energy forwarded to Congress the report and recommendations of a Nuclear Energy Advisory Committee review of the NGNP Project EPAct Phase 1 activities. The Secretary's letter concluded that “…Given current fiscal constraints, competing priorities, projected cost of the prototype, and the inability to reach agreement with industry on cost share, the Department will not proceed with the Phase 2 design activities at this time. The Project will continue to focus on high temperature reactor research and development activities, interactions with the Nuclear Regulatory Commission to develop a licensing framework, and establishment of a public-private partnership until conditions warrant a change of direction.”

Pre-licensing discussions regarding the NGNP were suspended in 2013 after the 2011 DOE decision not to proceed into the detailed design and license application phases of the NGNP Project and continuing efforts to advance the project ended unsuccessfully. DOE's decision cited impasses between DOE and the NGNP Industry Alliance in cost sharing arrangements for the public-private partnership required by Congress.

The overall project faltered in the mid-2010s due to a lack of pressing demand from industry and government stakeholders, and lack of funding commitment from both private and government sources. While the overall program made notable achievements in materials science and regulatory matters which saw further application, by 2015 the overall project was terminated without any fabrication or construction of a NGNP plant performed or planned.

== Status of the NGNP reactor design ==
Reactor designer and nuclear steam supply system vendor Areva, now Framatome, continues to market their HTGR designs globally. The Chinese HTR-PM is the only non-prototype HTGR in commercial service as of 2025.

== See also ==
- White hydrogen

== Sources ==
- Badwal, S. P. S.; et al. (Sep 2013). "Hydrogen production via solid electrolytic routes". WIREs Energy Environ. 2 (5): 473–487. Bibcode:2013WIREE...2..473B. doi:10.1002/wene.50. S2CID 135539661.
