= AVR reactor =

Prototype nuclear reactor in Germany

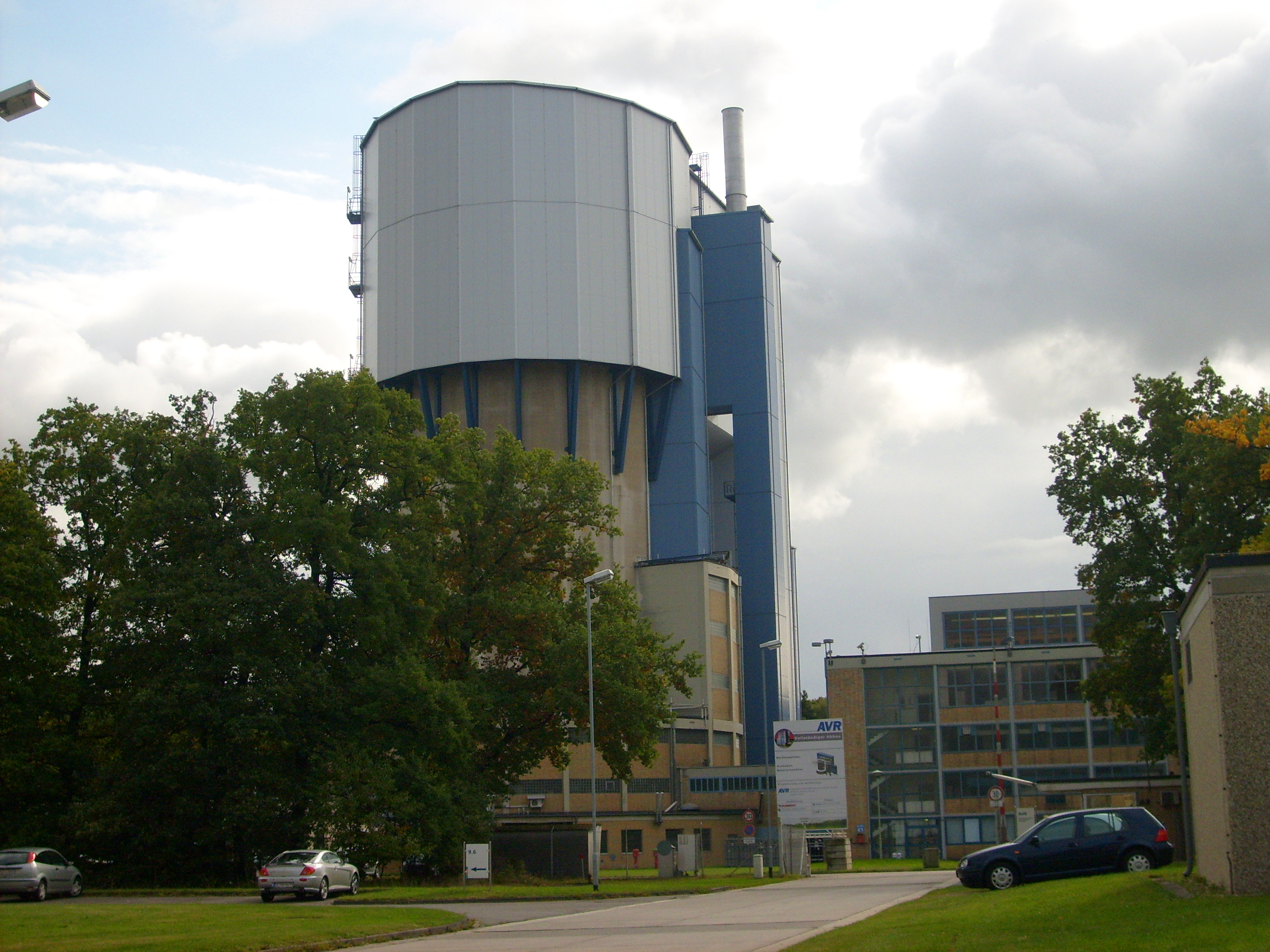
- Country: Germany
- Coordinates: 50°54′11″N 6°25′16″E
- Status: Decommissioned
- Construction began: 1961
- Commission date: May 19, 1969
- Decommission date: December 31, 1988

Power generation
- Units decommissioned: 1 x 15 MW
- Capacity factor: 50.0%
- Annual net output: 65.7 GWh

External links
- Commons: Related media on Commons

The AVR reactor (German: Arbeitsgemeinschaft Versuchsreaktor, literally: "Co-operative Test Reactor") was a prototype pebble-bed reactor, located immediately adjacent to Jülich Research Centre in West Germany, constructed in 1960, grid connected in 1967 and shut down in 1988. It was a 15 MWe, 46 MWt test reactor used to develop and test a variety of fuels and machinery.

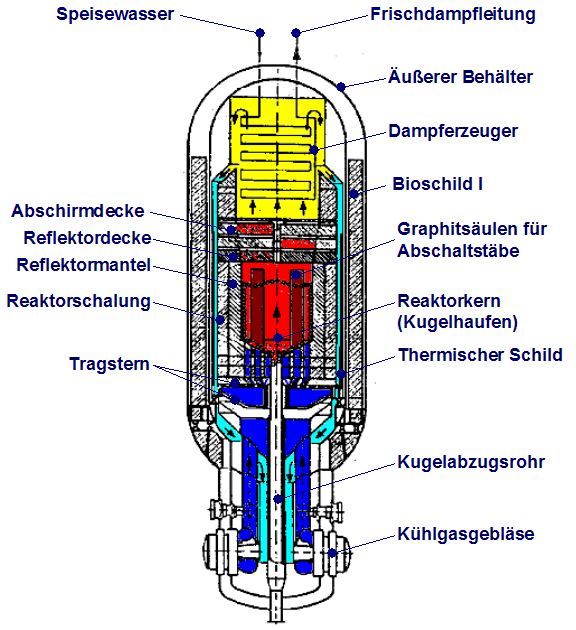
Schematic of AVR reactor originally without top shielding causing radiation skyshine

The AVR was based on the concept of a "Daniels pile" by Farrington Daniels, the inventor of pebble bed reactors. Rudolf Schulten is commonly recognized as the intellectual father of the reactor.

A consortium of 15 community electric companies owned and operated the plant. Over its lifetime the reactor had many accidents, earning it the name "Shipwreck". From 2011 to 2014, outside experts examined the historical operations and operational hazards and described serious concealed problems and wrongdoings in their final 2014 report. For example, in 1978 operators bypassed reactor shutdown controls to delay an emergency shutdown during an accident for six days. In 2014 the JRC and AVR publicly admitted to failures.

Its decommissioning has been exceptionally difficult, time-consuming and expensive. Since the original operators were overwhelmed by the effort, government agencies took over dismantling and disposal. In 2003 the reactor and its nuclear waste became government property. The temporary storage of 152 casks of spent fuel has been a controversy since 2009. The approval expired in 2013, because stress tests could not sufficiently demonstrate safety; no permanent solution has been reached. Since 2012 plans to export the casks to the United States have been considered due to the extremely high disposal expenses. In 2014, a massive concrete wall to protect against terrorist plane crashes was to be built. On July 2, 2014, the Federal Environment ministry issued an order to clear the waste from the temporary store.

AVR was the basis of the 1971 THTR-300 and, together, of the technology licensed to China to build HTR-10 and the HTR-PM, which became operational in 2021.

The reactor is located next to the largest open-pit coal mine in Germany, the Tagebau Hambach.

== History ==
In 1959, 15 municipal electric companies established the "Association of Experimental Reactor GmbH" (AVR Ltd) to demonstrate the feasibility and viability of a gas-cooled, graphite-moderated high temperature reactor. In 1961, BBC and Krupp began AVR construction, led by Rudolf Schulten, performed on almost purely industrial basis until 1964. The federal government provided financial assistance, supported by the politician and founder of the Jülich Research Center (JRC), Leo Brandt. In 1964, Schulten became Director of the JRC and started to devote more attention to the pebble bed reactor. In 1966, AVR first achieved criticality, and was connected to the national power grid in 1967. Construction cost figures vary between 85 and 125 million Deutsche marks Since about 1970 the AVR GmbH was de facto dependent on JRC, although it remained formally independent until 2003. JRC provided generous operating grants to AVR GmbH to ensure continued operation, since electricity generation only covered a small part of the operating costs. In the mid-1970s annual revenue was about 3 million DM, versus operating and fuel disposal costs of 11 million DM. JRC also subsidized AVR through procurement and disposal of fuel as JRC has been the owner of AVR fuel. In addition, the AVR operation was scientifically supervised by JRC.

=== Fuels tested ===
From 1974 to 1978, mainly carbide BISO fuel was in the core. From 1983 to 1988, oxide fuel with TRISO particles was used.

=== Higher temperatures ===
During its initial years (1967-1973) the AVR was nominally operated with cooling gas outlet temperatures of 650–850 °C. In February 1974, the cooling gas outlet temperature was raised to 950 °C. These final high temperatures were a world record for nuclear facilities, though later exceeded by the US test reactor UHTREX. Such high temperatures were supposed to demonstrate the suitability of the AVR for coal gasification, and thus contribute to long-term plans for coal in Northrhine-Westfalia. Because a pebble bed core cannot be equipped with instruments, the high AVR core temperatures were unknown until one year before the AVR shut-down, in 1988.

In 2000, AVR admitted that it was contaminated with 100 TBq ^{90}Sr, being the most heavily ^{90}Sr contaminated nuclear facility worldwide.

== Design ==
The core held about 100,000 fuel element pebbles. Each contained about 1g of ^{235}U. On average each would take 6 to 8 months to pass through the core. Helium flowed up through the core of pebbles.

== Contamination, internal and external ==
AVR's helium outlet temperature was 950 °C, but fuel temperature instabilities occurred during operation with localised exceedingly high temperatures. As a consequence the whole reactor vessel became heavily contaminated by ^{137}Cs and ^{90}Sr. Concerning beta-contamination AVR is the highest contaminated nuclear installation worldwide as AVR management confirmed 2001.

Thus in 2008, the reactor vessel was filled with light concrete to fixate the radioactive fine particle dust. In 2012, the reactor vessel of 2100 metric tons was to be transported about 200 meters by air-cushion sled and seven cranes to an intermediate storage site.

During a severe water accident in 1978, ^{90}Sr leaked, and in 1999 soil and groundwater contamination below the reactor was discovered, as confirmed by the German government in February 2010.

== Decommissioning ==
Fuel removal out of AVR was difficult and lasted four years. During this time it became obvious that the AVR bottom reflector was broken; about 200 fuel pebbles remain wedged in its crack. Currently no dismantling method for the AVR vessel exists. It is planned to develop some procedure during the next 60 years and to start with vessel dismantling at the end of the 21st century. After the AVR vessel is moved into intermediate storage, the reactor buildings will be dismantled, and soil and groundwater will be decontaminated. Costs from 1988 to present are €700 million. The total AVR decommissioning costs are expected to be in the order of €1.5 to 2.5 billion, all public funds, i.e. to exceed its construction costs by far.

== Independent expert review report, 2014 ==
From 2011 to 2014, outside experts examined the historical operations and operational hazards and in April 2014, published a report on the AVR operation. The report listed hidden or downplayed events and accidents and described serious concealed problems and wrongdoings. For example, in 1978 operators bypassed reactor shutdown controls to delay an emergency shutdown during an accident for six days. In 2014 the JRC and AVR publicly admitted to failures and issued a regret about its failures and scientific misconduct with respect to the AVR.

== See also ==
- Skyshine
- Thorium High Temperature Reactor
