= Farrington Daniels =

American physical chemist (1889–1972)

- Born: March 8, 1889; Minneapolis, Minnesota, U.S.
- Died: June 23, 1972 (aged 83)
- Education: University of Minnesota; Harvard University
- Known for: Pioneer of solar energy
- Awards: Willard Gibbs Award (1955); Priestley Medal (1957)
- Scientific career
- Fields: Physical chemist
- Institutions: Worcester Polytechnic Institute; University of Wisconsin
- Doctoral advisor: Theodore William Richards
- Doctoral students: John L. Magee; Stanford S. Penner

Farrington Daniels (March 8, 1889 – June 23, 1972) was an American physical chemist who is considered one of the pioneers of the modern direct use of solar energy.

== Biography ==
Daniels was born in Minneapolis, Minnesota on March 8, 1889. Daniels began day school in 1895 at the Kenwood School and then on to Douglas School. As a boy, he was fascinated with Thomas Edison, Samuel F. B. Morse, Alexander Graham Bell, and John Charles Fields. He decided early that he wanted to be an electrician and inventor. He attended Central and East Side high schools. By this point he liked chemistry and physics, but equally enjoyed "Manual Training."

In 1906, he entered the University of Minnesota, majoring in chemistry and adding to the usual mathematics and analytical courses some courses in botany and scientific German. He was initiated into the Beta Chapter of Alpha Chi Sigma in 1908. He sometimes worked summers as a railroad surveyor. He took his degree in chemistry in 1910. The following year he spent half his time teaching and received an MS for graduate work in physical chemistry. He entered Harvard in 1911, paying for his studies partly through a teaching fellowship, and received a PhD in 1914. His doctoral research on the electrochemistry of thallium alloys was supervised by Theodore William Richards.

In the summer of 1912, Daniels had visited England and Europe. After earning his PhD, Harvard would have sent him on a traveling fellowship in Europe, but World War I broke out. So instead he accepted a position as an instructor at the Worcester Polytechnic Institute, where, besides teaching, he found he had considerable time for research in calorimetry, for which he received a grant from the American Academy of Arts and Sciences. He joined the University of Wisconsin in 1920 as an assistant professor in 1920, and remained until his retirement in 1959 as chairman of the chemistry department.

During World War II, Daniels joined the staff of the Metallurgical Laboratory, a part of the Manhattan Project effort by the United States to develop the first nuclear weapons. He served first as associate director of the laboratory's chemistry division from the summer of 1944 before, on July 1, 1945, becoming overall director of that institution, a post held until May 1946. He was active in the planning of the laboratory's immediate successor, the Argonne National Laboratory, serving as the first chairman of its Board of Governors from 1946 until 1948. It was in that role, in 1947, that Daniels conceived the pebble bed reactor, a reactor design in which helium rises through fissioning uranium oxide or carbide pebbles, cooling them by carrying away heat for power production. The "Daniels' pile" was an early version of the later high-temperature gas-cooled reactor developed further at ORNL without success, but which was developed later as a nuclear power reactor by Rudolf Schulten.

Daniels became concerned to limit or stop the nuclear arms race after the war. In that regard, he became a board member of the Bulletin of the Atomic Scientists.

Daniels is also known for writing several textbooks on physical chemistry, including Mathematical preparation for physical chemistry (1928), Experimental physical chemistry, co-authored with J. Howard Mathews and John Warren (1934), Chemical Kinetics (1938), Physical Chemistry, co-authored with Robert Alberty (1957). Some of these books went through many subsequent editions until about 1980.

He was elected in 1928 a Fellow of the American Association for the Advancement of Science (AAAS). He was elected to the United States National Academy of Sciences in 1947 and the American Philosophical Society in 1948. He was awarded the Priestley Medal and elected to the American Academy of Arts and Sciences in 1957.

Daniels died on June 23, 1972, from complications from liver cancer. He was survived by his wife, four children, and twelve grandchildren.

He was inducted posthumously to the Alpha Chi Sigma Hall of Fame in 1982.

== Involvement with solar energy ==
Daniels became a leading American expert on the principles involved with the practical utilization of solar energy. He pursued understanding of the heat and the convection that can be derived from it, as well as the electrical energy that could be derived from it. As Director of the University of Wisconsin–Madison's Solar Energy Laboratory, he explored such areas of practical application as cooking, space heating, agricultural and industrial drying, distillation, cooling and refrigeration, and photo- and thermo-electric conversion, and he was also interested in energy storage. In particular, he believed there were many practical applications of solar energy for ready use in the developing world.

Daniels was active with the Association for Applied Solar Energy in the mid-1950s. He suggested that AFASE embark upon the publication of a scientific journal, and the first issue of The Journal of Solar Energy Science and Engineering appeared in January, 1957. Later, as Professor Emeritus of Chemistry of the University of Wisconsin–Madison, he led a group of solar scientists who proposed that AFASE be reorganized, that its directors and officers be elected by the membership, and that the name be changed to The Solar Energy Society – all of which was done. He supported solar energy because, as he said in 1955, "We realize, as never before, that our fossil fuels – coal, oil, and gas – will not last forever."

One of his classic books is Direct Use of the Sun's Energy, published by Yale University Press in 1964. The book was reprinted in a mass market edition in 1974 by Ballantine Books, after the 1973 oil crisis, and was described as "The best book on solar energy that I know of" by the Whole Earth Catalog's Steve Baer.
