= Pebble-bed reactor =

Type of very-high-temperature reactor

Sketch of a pebble-bed reactor.

A pebble-bed reactor (PBR) is a type of nuclear reactor where the nuclear fuel is contained within a bed of pyrolytic graphite spheres (pebbles), with the graphite serving as a neutron moderator. Pebble-bed reactors are typically high temperature gas-cooled reactors (HTGRs), and are capable of being refueled during operation. The helium-cooled PBR design is considered a type of very-high-temperature reactor (VHTR), one of the six classes of nuclear reactors in the Generation IV initiative.

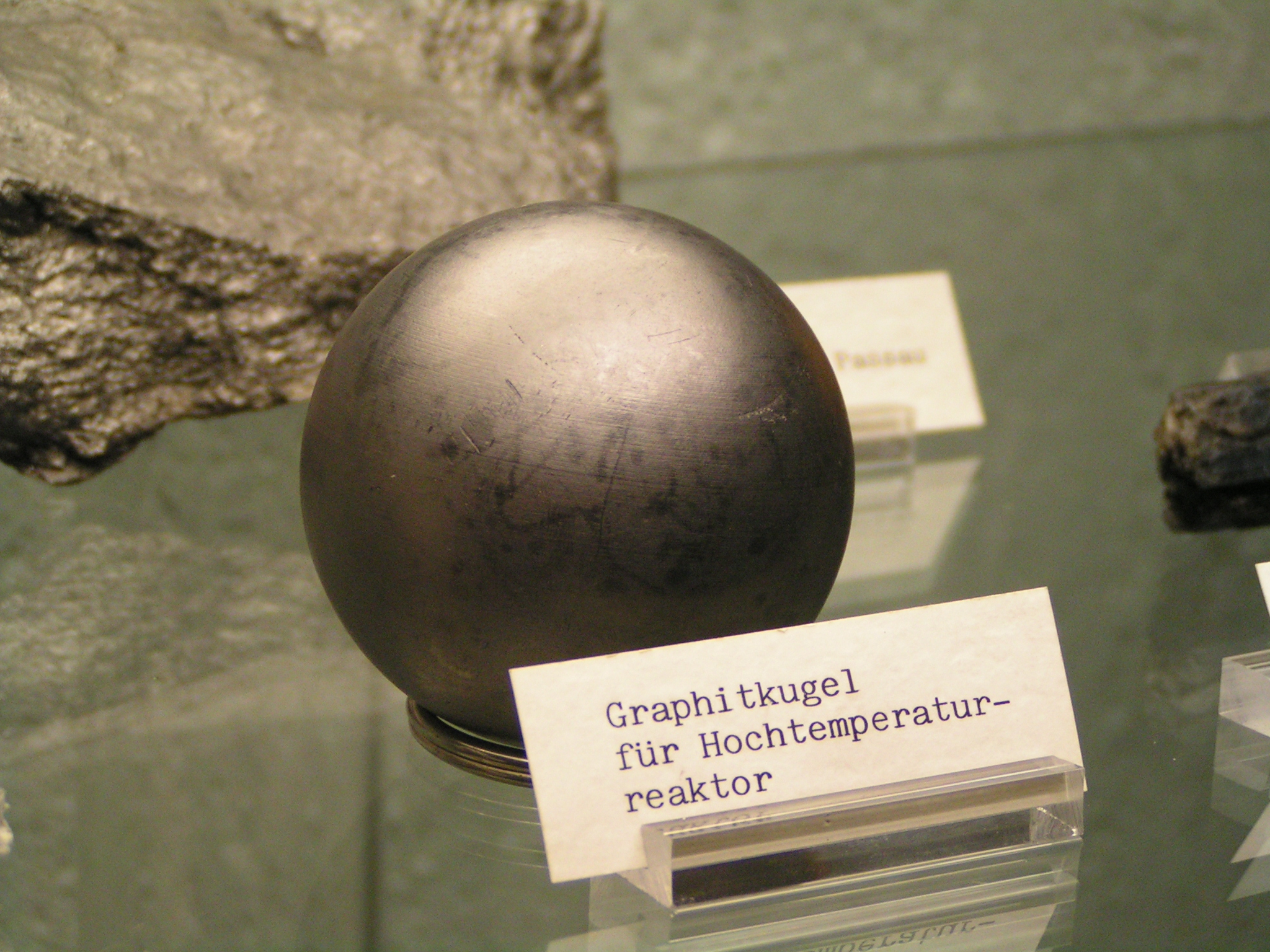
A graphite fuel pebble for a pebble-bed reactor

The basic design features spherical fuel elements called pebbles. These tennis ball-sized elements (approx. 6.7 cm or 2.6 in in diameter) are made of pyrolytic graphite (which acts as the moderator), and contain thousands of 1mm sized fuel particles called tristructural-isotropic (TRISO) particles. These TRISO particles consist of a fissile material (such as ^{235}U) surrounded by a ceramic coating of silicon carbide for structural integrity and fission product containment. Thousands of pebbles are amassed to create a reactor core. The core is cooled by a gas that does not react chemically with the fuel elements, such as helium, nitrogen, or carbon dioxide. Other coolants such as FLiBe (molten Li_{2}(BeF_{4})) have been suggested.

The pebble-bed design has passively safe features. Because the reactor is designed to handle high temperatures, it can cool by natural circulation and survive accident scenarios, which may raise the temperature of the reactor to 1,600 °C (2,910 °F). Their normal operating temperatures are higher than traditional nuclear power plants, allowing greater thermal efficiency (up to 50%). Additionally, the gases do not dissolve contaminants or absorb neutrons as water does, resulting in fewer radioactive fluids in the core.

The concept was first suggested by Farrington Daniels in the 1940s, inspired by the innovative design of the Benghazi burner by British desert troops in WWII. Commercial development came in the 1960s via the West German AVR reactor designed by Rudolf Schulten. This system was plagued with problems and the technology was abandoned. The AVR design was licensed to South Africa as the PBMR and China as the HTR-10. The HTR-10 prototype was developed into China's HTR-PM demonstration plant, which connects two reactors to a single turbine producing 210 MW_{e}, operating commercially since 2023. Other designs are under development by MIT, University of California at Berkeley, General Atomics (U.S.), Dutch company Romawa B.V., Adams Atomic Engines, Idaho National Laboratory, X-energy and Kairos Power.

== Design ==
A pebble-bed power plant combines a gas-cooled core and a novel fuel packaging.

The uranium, thorium or plutonium nuclear fuels are in the form of a ceramic (usually oxides or carbides) contained within spherical pebbles a little smaller than the size of a tennis ball and made of pyrolytic graphite, which acts as the primary neutron moderator. The pebble design is relatively simple, with each sphere consisting of the nuclear fuel, fission product barrier, and moderator (which in a traditional water reactor would all be different parts). Grouping sufficient pebbles in the correct geometry creates criticality.

The pebbles are held in a vessel, and an inert gas (such as helium, nitrogen or carbon dioxide) circulates through the spaces between the fuel pebbles to carry heat away from the reactor. Pebble-bed reactors must keep the pebbles' graphite from burning in the presence of air if the reactor wall is breached (the flammability of the pebbles is disputed). The heated gas is run directly through a turbine. However, if the gas from the primary coolant can be made radioactive by the neutrons in the reactor, or a fuel defect could contaminate the power production equipment, it may be brought instead to a heat exchanger where it heats another gas or produces steam. The turbine exhaust is warm and may be used to heat buildings or in other applications.

Pebble-bed reactors are gas-cooled, sometimes at low pressures. The spaces between the pebbles replace the piping in conventional reactors. Since there is no actual piping in the core and the coolant contains no hydrogen, embrittlement is not a failure concern. The preferred gas, helium, does not easily absorb neutrons or impurities. Therefore, compared to water, it is both more efficient and less likely to become radioactive.

Much of the cost of a conventional, water-cooled nuclear power plant is due to cooling system complexity, which is not a factor in PBRs. Conventional plants require extensive safety systems and redundant backups. Their reactor cores are dwarfed by cooling systems. Further, the core irradiates the water with neutrons causing the water and impurities dissolved in it to become radioactive. The high-pressure piping in the primary side eventually becomes embrittled and requires inspection and replacement.

Some designs are throttled by temperature rather than control rods. Such reactors do not need to operate well at the varying neutron profiles caused by partially withdrawn control rods.

PBRs can use fuel pebbles made from various fuels in the same design (though perhaps not simultaneously). Proponents claim that pebble-bed reactors can use thorium, plutonium and natural unenriched uranium, as well as enriched uranium.

In most stationary designs, fuel replacement is continuous. Pebbles are placed in a bin-shaped reactor. Pebbles travel from the bottom to the top about ten times over a period of years, and are tested after each pass. Expended pebbles are removed to the nuclear-waste area, replaced by a new pebble.

== Safety ==
When the reactor temperature rises, the atoms in the fuel move rapidly, causing Doppler broadening. The fuel then experiences a wider range of neutron speeds. Uranium-238, which forms the bulk of the uranium, is much more likely to absorb fast or epithermal neutrons at higher temperatures. This reduces the number of neutrons available to cause fission, and reduces power. Doppler broadening therefore creates a negative feedback: as fuel temperature increases, reactor power decreases. All reactors have reactivity feedback mechanisms. The pebble-bed reactor is designed so that this effect is relatively strong, inherent to the design, and does not depend on moving parts. This negative feedback creates passive control of the reaction process.

Thus PBRs passively reduce to a safe power-level in an accident scenario. This is the design's main passive safety feature.

The reactor is cooled by an inert, fireproof gas, which has no phase transitions—it is always in the gaseous phase. The moderator is solid carbon; it does not act as a coolant, or move, or change phase.

Convection of the gas, driven by the heat of the pebbles, ensures that the pebbles are passively cooled.

Even in the event that all supporting machinery fails, the reactor will not crack, melt, explode or spew hazardous wastes. It heats to a designed "idle" temperature, and stays there. At idle, the reactor vessel radiates heat, but the vessel and fuel spheres remain intact and undamaged. The machinery can be repaired or the fuel can be removed.

In a safety test using the German AVR reactor, all the control rods were removed, and coolant flow was halted. The fuel remained undamaged.

PBRs are intentionally operated above the 250 °C (482 °F) annealing temperature of graphite, so that Wigner energy does not accumulate. This solves a problem discovered in the Windscale fire. One reactor (not a PBR) caught fire because of the release of energy stored as crystalline dislocations (Wigner energy) in the graphite. The dislocations are caused by neutron passage through the graphite. Windscale regularly annealed the graphite to release accumulated Wigner energy. However, the effect was not anticipated, and since the reactor was cooled by ambient air in an open cycle, the process could not be reliably controlled, and led to a fire.

Berkeley professor Richard A. Muller described PBRs as "in every way ... safer than the present nuclear reactors".

=== Containment ===
Most PBR designs include multiple reinforcing levels of containment to prevent contact between the radioactive materials and the biosphere:

- Most reactors are enclosed in a containment building designed to resist aircraft crashes and earthquakes.
- The reactor is usually in a room with two-meter-thick walls with doors that can be closed, and cooling plenums that can be filled with water.
- The reactor vessel is typically sealed.
- Each pebble, within the vessel, is a 60 millimetres (2.4 in) hollow sphere of pyrolytic graphite, wrapped in fireproof silicon carbide.
- Low density porous pyrolytic carbon, high density nonporous pyrolytic carbon
- The fission fuel is in the form of metal oxides or carbides.

Pyrolytic graphite is the main structural material in pebbles. It sublimates at 4,000 °C (7,230 °F), more than double the design temperature of most reactors. It slows neutrons effectively, is strong, inexpensive, and has a long history of use in reactors and other high temperature applications. For example, pyrolytic graphite is also used, unreinforced, to construct missile reentry nose-cones and large solid rocket nozzles. Its strength and hardness come from its anisotropic crystals.

Pyrolytic carbon can burn in air when the reaction is catalyzed by a hydroxyl radical (e.g., from water). Infamous examples include the accidents at Windscale and Chernobyl—both graphite-moderated reactors. However, PBRs are cooled by inert gases to prevent fire. All designs have at least one layer of silicon carbide that serves as a fire break and seal.

=== Fuel production ===
All kernels are precipitated from a sol-gel, then washed, dried and calcined. U.S. kernels use uranium carbide, while German (AVR) kernels use uranium dioxide. German-produced fuel-pebbles release about 1000 times less radioactive gas than the U.S. equivalents, due to that construction method.

== Design criticisms ==
=== Graphite combustion ===
The primary criticism of pebble-bed reactors is that encasing the fuel in graphite poses a hazard. Graphite can burn in the presence of air, which could happen if the reactor vessel is compromised. Fire could vaporize the fuel, which could then be released to the surroundings. Fuel kernels are coated with a layer of silicon carbide to isolate the graphite. While silicon carbide is strong in abrasion and compression applications, it has less resistance to expansion and shear forces. Some fission products such as ^{133}Xe have limited absorbance in carbon, so some fuel kernels could accumulate enough gas to rupture the silicon carbide.

=== Containment building ===
Some designs do not include a containment building. However, most are surrounded by a reinforced concrete containment structure.

=== Waste handling ===
PBR waste volumes are much greater, but have similar radioactivity measured in becquerels per kilowatt-hour. The waste tends to be less hazardous and simpler to handle. Current US legislation requires all waste to be safely contained, requiring waste storage facilities. Pebble defects may complicate storage. Graphite pebbles are more difficult to reprocess due to their construction.

=== 2008 report ===
In 2008, a report about safety aspects of Germany's AVR reactor and general PBR features drew attention. The claims are contested. The report cited:

- Impossible to place standard measurement equipment in the reactor core
- The cooling circuit can be contaminated with metallic fission products (^{90}Sr, ^{137}Cs) due to limited pebble retention capabilities for metallic fission products. The report claimed that even modern fuel elements do not sufficiently retain strontium and caesium.
- Elevated core temperatures (>200 °C or 360 °F above calculated values)
- Dust formation from pebble friction under pebble breach (Dust acts as a mobile fission product carrier, if fission products escape the fuel particles.)

Report author Rainer Moormann, recommended that average hot helium temperatures be limited to 800 °C (1,470 °F) minus the uncertainty of the core temperatures (about 200 °C or 360 °F).

== History ==
Farrington Daniels originated the concept and the name in 1947 at Oak Ridge. Rudolf Schulten advanced the idea in the 1950s. The crucial insight was to combine fuel, structure, containment, and neutron moderator in a small, strong sphere. The concept depended on the availability of engineered forms of silicon carbide and pyrolytic carbon that were strong.

=== AVR ===
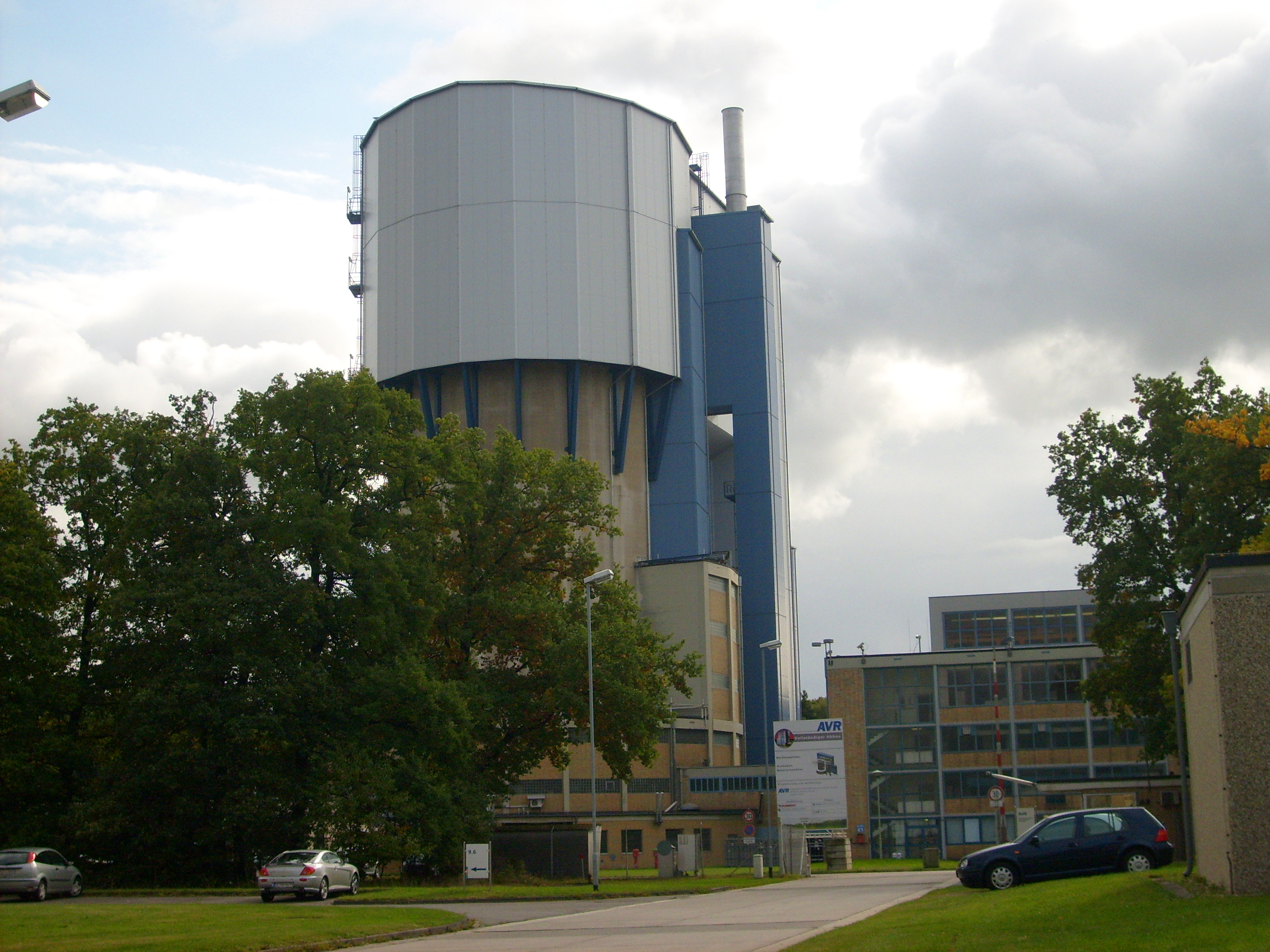
AVR in Germany.

A 15 MW_{e} demonstration reactor, Arbeitsgemeinschaft Versuchsreaktor (experimental reactor consortium), was built at the Jülich Research Centre in Jülich, West Germany. The goal was to gain operational experience with a high-temperature gas-cooled reactor. Construction costs of AVR were 115 million Deutschmark (1966), corresponding to a 2010 value of 180 million €. The unit's first criticality was on August 26, 1966. The facility ran successfully for 21 years.

In 1978, the AVR suffered from a water/steam ingress accident of 30 metric tons (30 long tons; 33 short tons), which led to contamination of soil and groundwater by strontium-90 and by tritium. The leak in the steam generator leading to this accident was probably caused by high core temperatures (see criticism section). A re-examination of this accident was announced by the local government in July 2010.

The AVR was originally designed to breed uranium-233 from thorium-232. A practical thorium breeder reactor was considered valuable technology. However, the AVR's fuel design contained the fuel so well that the transmuted fuels were uneconomic to extract—it was cheaper to use mined and purified uranium.

The AVR used helium coolant, has a low neutron cross-section. Since few neutrons are absorbed, the coolant remains less radioactive. It is practical to route the primary coolant directly to power generation turbines. Even though the power generation used primary coolant, it was reported that the AVR exposed its personnel to less than 1/5 as much radiation as a typical light water reactor.

==== Decommissioning ====
It was decommissioned on December 1, 1988, in the wake of the Chernobyl disaster and operational problems. During removal of the fuel elements it became apparent that the neutron reflector under the pebble-bed core had cracked during operation. Some hundred fuel elements remained stuck in the crack. During this examination it was revealed that the AVR was the world's most heavily beta-contaminated (strontium-90) nuclear installation and that this contamination was present as dust (the worst form).

Localized fuel temperature instabilities resulted in heavy vessel contamination by Cs-137 and Sr-90. The reactor vessel was filled with light concrete in order to fix the radioactive dust and in 2012 the reactor vessel of 2,100 metric tons (2,100 long tons; 2,300 short tons) was to be moved to intermediate storage until a permanent solution is devised. The reactor buildings were to be dismantled and soil and groundwater decontaminated. AVR dismantling costs were expected to far exceed its construction costs. In August 2010, the German government estimated costs for AVR dismantling without consideration of the vessel dismantling at 600 million € ( $750 million, which corresponded to 0.4 € ($0.55) per kWh of electricity generated by the AVR. A separate containment was erected for dismantling purposes, as seen in the AVR-picture.

==== Thorium high-temperature reactor ====
Following the experience with the AVR, Germany constructed a full scale power station (the thorium high-temperature reactor or THTR-300 rated at 300 MW), using thorium as the fuel. THTR-300 suffered technical difficulties, and owing to these and political events in Germany, was closed after four years of operation. An incident on 4 May 1986, only a few days after the Chernobyl disaster, allowed a release of part of the radioactive inventory into the environment. Although the radiological impact was small, it had a disproportionate impact. The release was caused by a human error during a blockage of pebbles in a pipe. Trying to restart the pebbles' movement by increasing gas flow stirred up dust, always present in PBRs, which was then released, unfiltered, into the environment due to an erroneously open valve.

In spite of the limited amount of radioactivity released (0.1 GBq ^{60}Co, ^{137}Cs, ^{233}Pa), a commission of inquiry was appointed. The radioactivity in the vicinity of the THTR-300 was finally found to result 25% from Chernobyl and 75% from THTR-300. The handling of this minor accident severely damaged the credibility of the German pebble-bed community, which lost support in Germany.

The overly complex design of the reactor, which is contrary to the general concept of self-moderated thorium reactors designed in the U.S., also suffered from the unplanned high destruction rate of pebbles during the test series and the resulting higher contamination of the containment structure. Pebble debris and graphite dust blocked some of the coolant channels in the bottom reflector, as was discovered during fuel removal after final shut-down. A failure of insulation required frequent reactor shut-downs for inspection, because the insulation could not be repaired. Metallic components in the hot gas duct failed in September 1988, probably due to thermal fatigue induced by unexpected hot gas currents. This failure led to a long shut-down for inspections. In August, 1989, the THTR company almost went bankrupt, but was rescued by the government. The unexpected high costs of THTR operation and the accident ended interest in THTR reactors. The government decided to terminate the THTR operation at the end of September, 1989. This particular reactor was built despite criticism at the design phase. Most of those design critiques by German physicists, and by American physicists at the National Laboratory level, went ignored until shutdown. Nearly every problem encountered by the THTR 300 reactor was predicted by the physicists who criticized it as "overly complex".

=== China ===
In 2004, China licensed the AVR technology and developed a reactor for power generation. The 10 megawatt prototype is called the HTR-10. It is a conventional helium-cooled, helium-turbine design. In 2021, the Chinese then built a 211 MW_{e} gross unit HTR-PM, which incorporates two 250 MW_{t} reactors. As of 2021, four sites were being considered for a 6-reactor successor, the HTR-PM600.

== Other designs ==
=== South Africa ===
In June 2004, it was announced that a new PBMR would be built at Koeberg, South Africa by Eskom, the government-owned electrical utility to operate at 940 °C (1,720 °F). The PBMR project was opposed by groups such as Koeberg Alert and Earthlife Africa, the latter of which sued Eskom. The reactor was never completed and the testing facility was decommissioned and placed in a "care and maintenance mode" to protect the IP and the assets.

A Pretoria-based company, Stratek Global, created a variant of the PBMR reactor. The Stratek HTMR-100 reactor functions at 750 °C (1,380 °F). It directs the heat into water to create steam and is helium-cooled. The HTMR-100 reactor produces output of 35 MWe.

=== X-Energy ===
X-energy, Inc. is a publicly traded American nuclear reactor and fuel engineering company, headquartered in Rockville, Maryland. It is developing a pebble-bed high-temperature gas-cooled reactor, the Xe-100, as well as a proprietary type of TRISO fuel called TRISO-X.

== See also ==
- Gas turbine modular helium reactor – US/Russian design concept ~1997 - never built
- Generation IV reactor – New nuclear reactor technologies under development
- Next Generation Nuclear Plant – Cancelled American reactor project
- Very high temperature reactor – Type of nuclear reactor that operates at high temperatures as part of normal operation
- Nuclear fuel
- Nuclear safety
- Rainer Moormann
