= Rainer Moormann =

German chemist and nuclear whistleblower (born 1950)

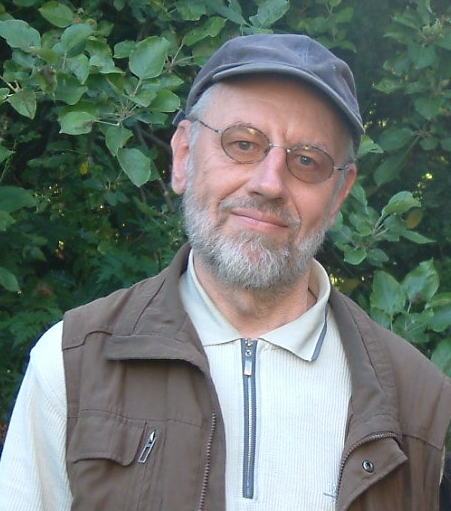
Rainer Moormann

Rainer Moormann (born 1950) is a German chemist and nuclear whistleblower.

== Whistleblower award ==
For doing this despite the occupational disadvantages he had to accept as a consequence, Moormann was awarded the whistleblower award of the Federation of German Scientists (VDW) and of the German section of the International Association of Lawyers against Nuclear Arms (IALANA).

== Papers ==
In 2020, Moormann co-authored a paper that argued in favor of keeping the available six German nuclear power plants running in order to reduce CO_{2} emissions.

== See also ==
- List of nuclear whistleblowers
