= HTR-PM =

Chinese small modular nuclear reactor

HTR-PM demonstration plant
- Country: People's Republic of China
- Location: Shidao Bay Nuclear Power Plant, Rongcheng, Weihai, Shandong
- Coordinates: 36°58′20″N 122°31′44″E
- Status: Operational
- Construction began: 9 December 2012
- Commission date: 20 December 2021

Nuclear power station
- Reactor type: pebble-bed reactor HTGR

Power generation
- Nameplate capacity: 210 MW; 500 MWth

The HTR-PM (Chinese: 球床模块式高温气冷堆核电站) is a Chinese small modular nuclear reactor. It is a high-temperature gas-cooled (HTGR) pebble-bed generation IV reactor evolved from the HTR-10 prototype. The technology is intended to replace coal-fired power plants in China's interior, in line with the country's plan to reach carbon neutrality by 2060.

The first plant has an electrical output of 210 MW. It began producing power in December 2021 and started commercial operation in late 2023.

== Technology ==
The HTR-PM is a high-temperature gas-cooled (HTGR) pebble-bed demonstration plant. While the German AVR and THTR-300, operating from 1969 to 1988, were the first pebble-bed reactors and operated at similar temperatures, the HTR-PM is the first such design using modular construction and the second small modular reactor, following Russia's Akademik Lomonosov floating plant in 2019. It is a generation IV design. The technology is based on the HTR-10 prototype reactor.

A single reactor module has a thermal capacity of 250 MW. Two reactors are connected to a steam turbine to generate 210 MW_{e}.

The reactor is inherently safe, because even if the primary loop loses power, it will cool passively and will not suffer a meltdown. Even if the coolant pipes of the primary loop rupture and detach from the reactor core (damage beyond baseline design), the core does not melt down and will cool itself through natural convection, without releasing radioactive materials.

== History ==
The demonstration project for the High-Temperature gas-cooled Reactor Pebble-bed Module (HTR-PM) was launched in 2001. Work on the first demonstration power plant, composed of two reactors driving a single steam turbine, began in December 2012 in Shidao Bay Nuclear Power Plant in Shandong province. The pressure vessels of the two reactors were installed in 2016.

A 2018 paper by Rainer Moormann recommended additional safety measures based on experience with the AVR reactor.

The steam generator shell, hot gas duct shell and reactor pressure vessel shell of the first reactor in the project were successfully paired on 28 April 2020, paving the way for the installation of the main helium fan.

Cold functional tests were successfully completed between October and November 2020. The air and helium mixture was pressurized to a maximum of 8.9 MPa (1,290 psi) in the primary coolant loop. Following the cold functional tests, the hot tests were performed in three stages: vacuum dehumidification, heating and dehumidification and hot functional tests. The hot tests began in December 2020. On 12 September 2021, the first of two reactors achieved criticality. On 11 November 2021, reactor two achieved first criticality. On 20 December 2021, reactor one was connected to the state power grid and began producing power. On 9 December 2022, the HTR-PM project demonstrated it had reached "initial full power". Two world-first safety demonstrations were performed, showing that in the event of a total power supply loss, the decay heat inside the reactor would dissipate and cool down naturally without any human intervention or emergency core cooling. The plant entered commercial operation in December 2023. An updated larger power plant, HTR-PM600, is planned with a capacity of 600 MWe using six HTR-PM reactor units.

== See also ==
- Nuclear power in China
