= Energy Multiplier Module =

Proposed nuclear reactor design

The Energy Multiplier Module (EM^{2} or EM squared) is a nuclear fission reactor design under development by General Atomics since 2009. It would be a fast-neutron version of the Gas Turbine Modular Helium Reactor (GT-MHR), capable of converting spent nuclear fuel into electricity and industrial process heat.

== Design specifications ==
EM2 is an advanced modular reactor expected to produce 240 MW_{e} at a core outlet temperature of 850 °C (1,600 °F). The reactor will be fully enclosed in an underground containment structure for 30 years without requiring refueling. EM2 differs from current reactors in that it does not use water coolant but is instead a gas-cooled fast reactor, which uses helium as a coolant. The reactor uses a composite of silicon carbide as a fuel cladding material and zirconium silicide as neutron reflector material. The reactor unit is coupled to direct-drive helium closed-cycle gas turbine which drives a generator to produce electricity.

The nuclear core design is based upon a new conversion technique in which an initial "starter" section of the core provides the neutrons to convert fertile material (used nuclear fuel, thorium, or depleted uranium) into burnable fissile fuel. First generation EM2 units use enriched uranium starters (approximately 15 percent U235) to initiate the conversion process. The starter U235 is consumed as the fertile material is converted to fissile fuel. The core life expectancy is approximately 30 years without refueling or reshuffling the fuel.

Substantial amounts of usable fissile material remain in the EM2 core at the end of life. This material can be reused as the starter for the second generation of EM2s, without conventional nuclear reprocessing. There is no separation of individual heavy metals required and no additional enriched uranium needed. Only fission products would be removed, which would decay to near-background radiation levels in about 500 years compared to conventional spent fuel, which requires about 10,000 years.

All EM2 heavy metal discharges could be recycled into new EM2 units, effectively closing the nuclear fuel cycle, which minimizes nuclear proliferation risks and the need for long-term repositories to secure nuclear materials.

== Economics and workforce capacity ==
As of 2010, it is projected to take 12 years and $1.7 billion to develop, gain regulatory permissions, and build a first reactor.

EM2 power costs are expected to be lower due to high power conversion (from thermal input to electric output) efficiency, a reduced number of components, and long core life. EM2 is expected to achieve a thermal efficiency of above 50% due to its high core outlet temperature and closed Brayton power cycle. The Brayton cycle eliminates many expensive components, including steam generators, pressurizers, condensers, and feedwater pumps. The design would utilize only 1/6th of the nuclear concrete of a conventional light water reactor.

Each module can be manufactured in either U.S. domestic or foreign facilities using replacement parts manufacturing and supply chain management with large components shipped by commercial truck or rail to a site for final assembly, where it will be fully enclosed in an underground containment structure. Dry cooling capability allows siting in locations without a source of cooling water.

EM2's high operating temperature can provide process heat for petrochemical fuel products and alternative fuels, such as biofuels and hydrogen. If the reactor is to become part of a hydrogen economy, the coolant outlet temperature of 850 °C would allow the sulfur iodine cycle to be used which directly converts thermal energy into hydrogen (without electric or other intermediate steps) with an overall thermal efficiency around 50%.

== Nuclear safety ==
EM2 utilizes passive safety systems designed to safely shutdown the reactor in emergency conditions using only gravity and natural convection. Control rods are automatically inserted during a loss-of-power incident via gravity. Natural convection flow is used to cool the core during whole site loss of power incidents. No external water supply is necessary for emergency cooling. The use of silicon carbide as fuel cladding in the core ensures no hydrogen production during accident scenarios and allows an extended period of response when compared to Zircaloy metal cladding used in current reactors.

== Nuclear waste ==
EM2 can burn used spent nuclear fuel from current light water reactors. It can utilize an estimated 97% of unused fuel that current reactors leave behind as waste. Spent fuel rods from conventional nuclear reactors are put into storage and considered to be nuclear waste, by the nuclear industry and the general public. Nuclear waste from light water reactors retains more than 95% of its original energy because such reactors cannot burn fertile U238, while fast reactors can. The current U.S. inventory of spent fuel is equivalent to nine trillion barrels of oil - four times more than the known reserves.

== Non-proliferation and security ==
By using spent nuclear waste and depleted uranium stockpiles as its fuel source, a large-scale deployment of the EM2 could reduce the long-term need for uranium enrichment and eliminate conventional nuclear reprocessing, which requires plutonium separation.

Conventional light water reactors require refueling every 18 months. EM2's 30-year fuel cycle minimizes the need for fuel handling and reduces access to fuel material, thus reducing proliferation concerns. Underground siting improves safety and security of the plant against terrorism and other threats.

== See also ==
- Nuclear Energy Institute
- Nuclear power
- Nuclear safety in the United States
- Economics of new nuclear power plants
- United States Department of Energy
