= HTR-10 =

Prototype pebble bed reactor, China

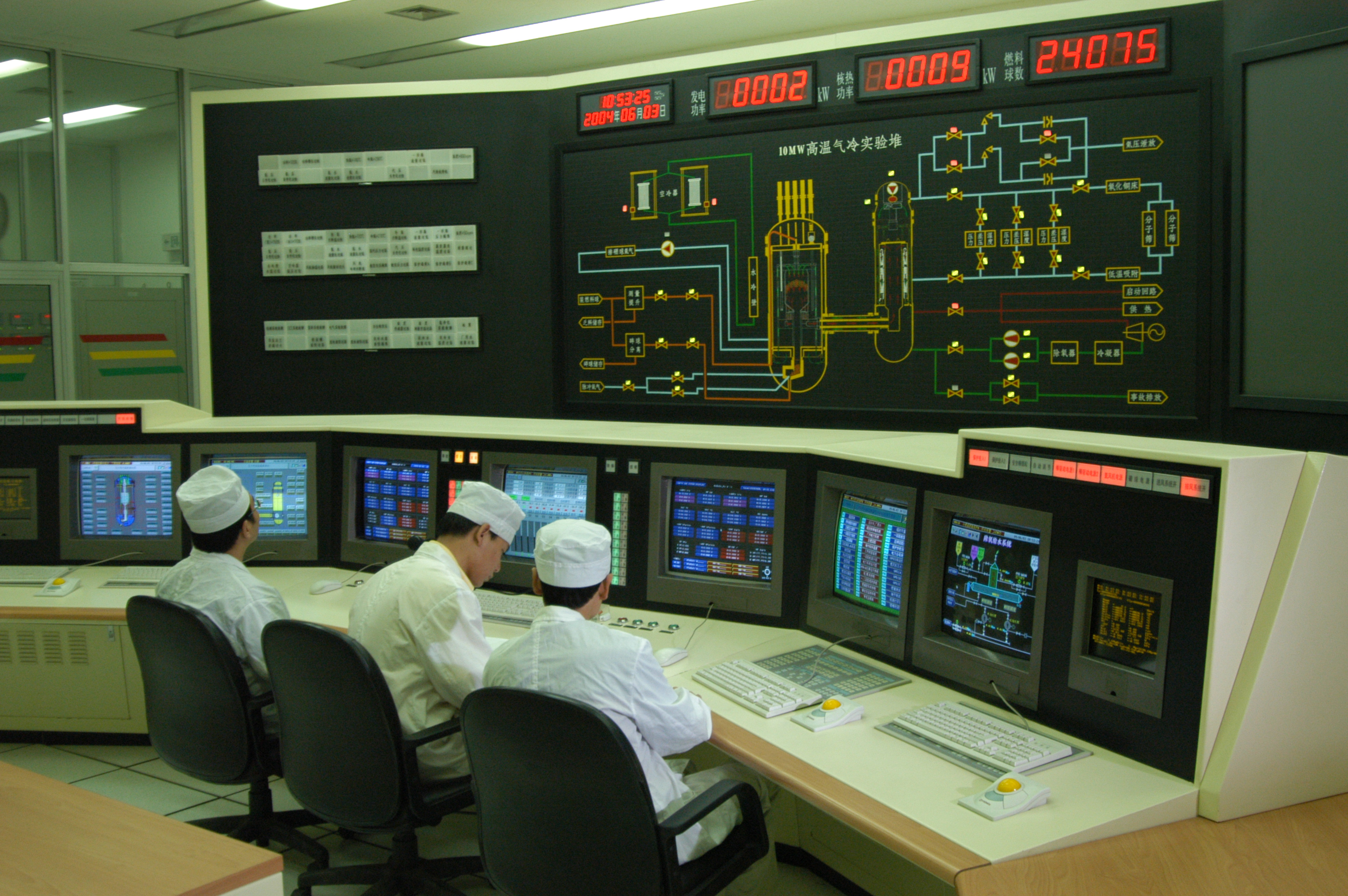
- Control room of HTR-10 reactor
- Country: People's Republic of China
- Location: Tsinghua University
- Coordinates: 40°15′26″N 116°08′59″E
- Status: Operational
- Construction began: 1995
- Commission date: January 2003
- Owner: Tsinghua University

Nuclear power station
- Reactor type: pebble-bed reactor HTGR
- Cooling source: Helium

Power generation
- Units operational: 10 MW

HTR-10 is a 10 MWt prototype high-temperature gas-cooled, pebble-bed reactor at Tsinghua University in China. Construction began in 1995, achieving its first criticality in December 2000, and was operated in full power condition in January 2003.

Two HTR-PM reactors, scaled up versions of the HTR-10 with 250-MWt capacity, were installed at the Shidao Bay Nuclear Power Plant near the city of Rongcheng in Shandong Province and achieved first criticality in September 2021.

== Development ==
The Institute of Nuclear Energy Technology (INET) of Tsinghua University is the lead designer for the HTR-10 reactor. The project was approved by the State Council in March 1992. The Design Criteria and Safety Analysis Report for the HTR-10 were approved in August 1992 and March 1993. In August 1994, Siemens/Interatom reviewed the fundamental design of the HTR-10 and exchanged knowledge gained from their advanced design efforts on the HTR-MODUL with INET. Like the HTR-MODUL, HTR-10 is claimed to be fundamentally safer, potentially cheaper and more efficient than other nuclear reactor designs. Outlet temperature ranges between 700 and 750 °C (1,300–1,375 °F).

HTR-10 is a pebble-bed high-temperature gas reactor utilizing spherical fuel elements with ceramic coated fuel particles. The reactor core has a diameter of 1.8 metres (5 ft 11 in), a mean height of 1.97 metres (6 ft 6 in) and the volume of 5.0 cubic metres (180 cu ft), and is surrounded by graphite reflectors. The core is composed of 27,000 fuel elements. The fuel elements use low enriched uranium with a design mean burn up of 80,000 MWd/t. The pressure of the primary helium coolant circuit is 3.0 megapascals (440 psi).

== See also ==
- Pebble bed modular reactor
- High-temperature engineering test reactor
