= Pebble Bed Modular Reactor =

South African nuclear reactor design

Pebble Bed Modular Reactor (Pty) Ltd
- Type: Engineering
- Industry: Nuclear
- Founded: 1993
- Defunct: 2010
- Headquarters: Centurion, Gauteng, South Africa
- Area served: South Africa, International
- Key people: CEO: Alex Tsela (acting since March 2010)
- Services: Design, Project Management and Related Services
- Revenue: total invested R9.2 billion (US$1.3 billion)
- Number of employees: Est. 900, reduction to 9
- Website: http://www.pbmr.com

The Pebble Bed Modular Reactor (PBMR) is a particular design of pebble bed reactor developed by South African company PBMR (Pty) Ltd from 1993 until 2009. PBMR facilities include gas turbine and heat transfer labs at the Potchefstroom Campus of North-West University, and at Pelindaba, a high pressure and temperature helium test rig, as well as a prototype fuel fabrication plant. A planned test reactor at Koeberg Nuclear Power Station was not built.

== Reactor design ==
The PBMR is characterised by inherent safety features, which mean that no human error or equipment failure can cause an accident that would harm the public.

Heat from the PBMR can be used for a variety of industrial process applications, including process steam for cogeneration applications, in-situ oil sands recovery, ethanol applications, refinery and petrochemical applications. The high temperature heat can also be used to reform methane to produce syngas (where the syngas can be used as feedstock to produce hydrogen, ammonia and methanol); and to produce hydrogen and oxygen by decomposing water thermochemically.

The PBMR is modular in that only small to mid-sized units will be designed. Larger power stations will be built by combining many of these modules. As of 2008, 400MWt was emerging as an optimum module size, considerably larger than the original concept size.

The PBMR is fuelled and moderated by graphite fuel spheres each containing TRISO coated low enriched uranium oxide fuel particles. There are 15000 fuel particles per fuel sphere the size of a billiard ball. "Each fuel pebble contains 9 g of uranium, and this holds enough generation capacity to sustain a family of four, for a year. Five tons of coal and up to 23 000 m^{3} of water will be required to generate one pebble's energy".

The concept is based on the AVR reactor and THTR in Germany, but modified to drive a Brayton closed-cycle gas turbine. The core design is annular with a centre column as a neutron reflector.

== History ==
PMBR Pty was formed in 1993, and in 1995 was supported by the South African government. Between 1999 and 2004, over 100 patents were developed by the project.

In 2006, the US Department of Energy awarded the PBMR consortium the primary contract for the first phase of its New Generation Nuclear Plant (NGNP) project. The scope for the first phase of this contract, which has now been completed, was for the pre-conceptual engineering of a nuclear co-generation plant for the production of electricity and hydrogen. Requests for proposals for the second phase of the NGNP project will soon be issued, to which the PBMR consortium will be responding within the next few months of 2009.

In 2009 PBMR (Pty) announced that it was looking at employing the technology for process heat applications, and some pebble bed reactor contracts had been put on hold to prevent unnecessary spending

=== Wind down in 2010 ===
In February 2010 the South Africa government announced it had stopped funding the development of the pebble bed modular reactor, and PBMR (Pty) stated it was considering 75% cuts in staff. The decision was taken because no customer or investor for PBMR was found, and the government stated that an additional R30 billion (US$4 billion) of investment would be needed. Unresolved technical items, a substantial increase of costs and a 2008 report from Forschungszentrum Jülich about major problems in operation of the German pebble bed reactor AVR had discouraged potential investors. International banks refused to support the PBMR project by loans. PBMR's CEO resigned on March, 8th 2010.

In May 2010 Westinghouse withdrew from the PBMR consortium, which led to an end of the South African engagement in NGNP.

In Sept 2010 the SA govt announced that in future, the South African nuclear program will concentrate on conventional light water reactors.

The NGNP project will continue on HTGRs with prismatic fuel elements, not with pebbles as in PBMR, as was announced in February 2012.

R9.244 billion (US$1.3 billion) had been invested in the PBMR project. Over 80% came from the South African government, with smaller amounts from Eskom (8.8%), Westinghouse (4.9%), Industrial Development Corporation (4.9%) and Exelon (1.1%).

== Legacy ==
About a dozen employees at PBMR later joined the US company X-energy, which is developing a similar reactor: a high temperature gas-cooled reactor that would use TRISO fuel.

=== Stratek Global ===
A Pretoria-based South African company designed a variant of the PBMR reactor named the HTMR-100. It functions at a lower temperature (750°C rather than 940°C) to reduce costs, and routes the helium primary coolant through a steam generator to use standard steam turbines for electricity generation. The HTMR-100 reactor would also be smaller, with an output of 35 MWe.
