= THTR-300 =

Thorium nuclear reactor in Germany

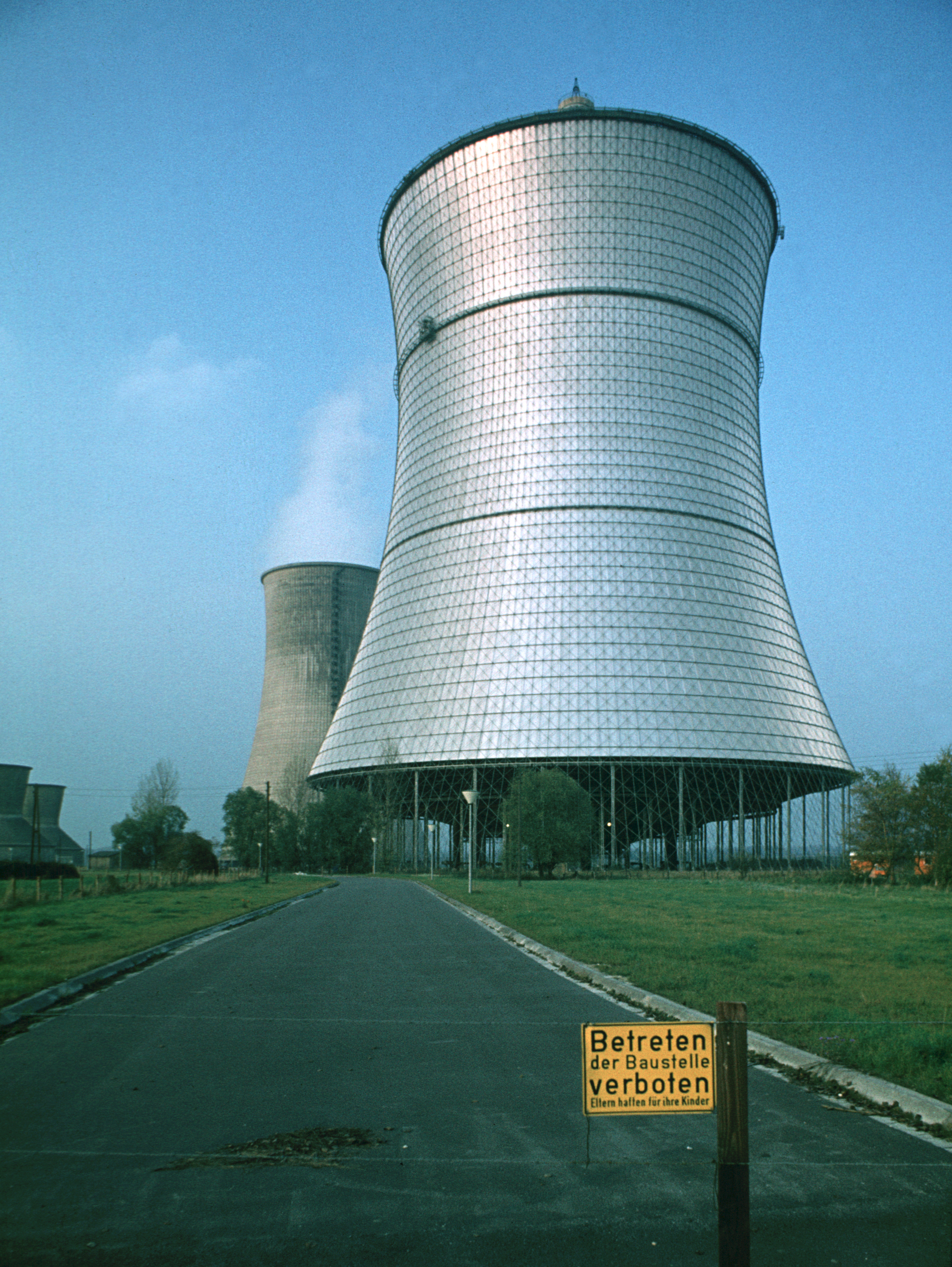
- Cooling tower of the THTR-300 (demolished in 1991)
- Country: Germany
- Coordinates: 51°40′45″N 7°58′18″E
- Status: Decommissioned
- Construction began: 1971
- Commission date: 16 November 1985
- Decommission date: 20 April 1988
- Owner: HKG
- Operator: HKG

Nuclear power station
- Reactor type: PBR

Power generation
- Units decommissioned: 1 × 308 MW
- Nameplate capacity: 308 MW
- Capacity factor: 40.1%
- Annual net output: 1,083 GWh

External links
- Website: Official website
- Commons: Related media on Commons

The THTR-300 was a thorium cycle high-temperature nuclear reactor rated at 300 MW electric (THTR-300) in Hamm-Uentrop, West Germany. It started operating in 1983, synchronized with the grid in 1985, operated at full power in February 1987 and was shut down on 1 September 1989. The THTR-300 served as a prototype high-temperature reactor (HTR) to use the TRISO pebble fuel produced by the AVR, an experimental pebble bed operated by VEW (Vereinigte Elektrizitätswerke Westfalen). The THTR-300 cost €2.05 billion and was predicted to cost an additional €425 million through December 2009 in decommissioning and other associated costs. The German state of North Rhine Westphalia, Federal Republic of Germany, and Hochtemperatur-Kernkraftwerk GmbH (HKG) financed the THTR-300’s construction.

== History ==
On 4 June 1974, the Council of the European Communities established the Joint Undertaking "Hochtemperatur-Kernkraftwerk GmbH" (HKG).

The electrical generation part of the THTR-300 was finished late due to ever-newer requirements and licensing procedures. It was constructed in Hamm-Uentrop from 1970 to 1983 by Hochtemperatur-Kernkraftwerk GmbH (HKG). Heinz Riesenhuber, Federal Secretary of Research at that time, inaugurated it, and it first went critical on 13 September 1983. It started generating electricity on 9 April 1985, but did not receive permission from the atomic legal authorizing agency to feed electricity to the grid until 16 November 1985. It operated at full power in February 1987 and was shut down on 1 September 1989, after operating for less than 16,000 hours.

Because the operator did not expect the decision to decommission the facility, the plant was put into "safe enclosure" status, given that this was the only technical solution for fast decommissioning, especially in consideration of the lack of a final storage facility.

== Design ==
The THTR-300 was a helium-cooled high-temperature reactor with a pebble bed core consisting of approximately 670,000 spherical fuel compacts each 6 centimetres (2.4 in) in diameter with particles of uranium-235 and thorium-232 fuel embedded in a graphite matrix. The pressure vessel that contained the pebbles was prestressed concrete. The THTR-300's power conversion system was similar to the Fort St. Vrain reactor in the USA, in that the reactor coolant transferred the reactor core's heat to water.

The thermal output of the core was 750 megawatts; heat was transferred to the helium coolant, which then transported its heat to water, which then was used to generate electricity via a Rankine cycle. Because this system used a Rankine cycle, water could occasionally ingress into the helium circuit. The electric conversion system produced 308 megawatts of electricity. The waste heat from the THTR-300 was exhausted using a dry cooling tower.

== Incidents ==
On 4 May 1986 fuel pebbles became lodged in the fuel feeding system due to handling errors by the control room operator, specifically the manual override of the automated fuel loading mechanism, a deviation from standard operating procedures. Consequently, radioactive helium containing aerosols was released to the environment via the feed system's exhaust air chimney. The incident initially went unnoticed due to the overlap with radioactive fallout from the Chernobyl disaster, complicating attribution. An anonymous informant from the THTR-300 workforce was the first to blow the whistle on the incident, and alleged that there was a deliberate attempt to conceal the radioactive emissions from authorities and environmental groups. The reactor operators had up to this point concealed the incident from regulatory authorities, then denied any irregularities, claiming that any emissions were within permissible limits and were part of normal operations. They attributed the detected radioactivity to routine discharges or to the existing contamination from Chernobyl. Official investigations were delayed, and environmental monitoring stations eventually identified unusual levels of radioactive Protactinium-233 (²³³Pa) isotopes, inconsistent with fallout from Chernobyl.

The plant had to be ordered to shut down while the effects of the incident were assessed. Later analysis showed that the plant had released radioactive aerosols, estimated at up to 2 · 10^{8} Bq, likely slightly below 180-day operation limits of 1,85 · 10^{8} Bq, yet possibly above daily limits of 0,74 · 10^{8} Bq. The exact amount of released material could never be determined. Control room operators, when confronted with radiation alarms, disabled aerosol measuring equipment and failed to change filters that would have allowed for exact measurements of the release, again deviating from procedures.

Repeated false and misleading statements by the operator quickly eroded trust of state and federal officials, as well as the public. The backdrop of the ongoing Chernobyl crisis, where the accident was concealed, too, further undermined public perception of Germany's nuclear power plants, contributing to growing negative sentiments about nuclear energy in Germany.

Beginning in late 1985, the reactor experienced difficulties with fuel elements breaking more often than anticipated. The presumptive cause of the fuel element damage was the frequent and overly-deep insertion of control rods during the commissioning process.

The Nukem fuel factory in Hanau was decommissioned in 1988 for security reasons, endangering the fuel fabrication chain.

It was decided on 1 September 1989 to shut down THTR-300, which was submitted to the supervisory authority by the HKG on 26 September 1989 in accordance with the Atomic Energy Act.

In the short operational life span of THTR-300 from 1985 to 1989, with only 423 full-load operating day equivalents, 80 incidents were logged. The nuclear power plant was plagued with shutdowns due to design issues, generating only 2891 GWh, far less than anticipated, never reaching the required availability of 70% (1988: 41%).

== Decommissioning ==
On 1 September 1989 the THTR-300 was deactivated due to cost and the anti nuclear sentiments after Chernobyl. In August 1989, the THTR company was almost bankrupted after a long period of shut down due to broken components in the hot gas duct. The German government bailed the company out with 92 million Mark.

THTR-300 was in full service for 423 days. On 10 October 1991 the 180-metre-high (590 ft) dry cooling tower, which at one time was the highest cooling tower in the world, was explosively dismantled and from 22 October 1993 to April 1995 the remaining fuel was unloaded and transported to the intermediate storage in Ahaus. The remaining facility was "safely enclosed". Dismantling is not expected to start before 2027.

From 2013 to 2017, 23 Million Euro were budgeted for lighting, safeguarding and the storage of the pellets in the interim storage facility in Ahaus. As was determined in 1989, dismantling would begin after approximately 30 years in safe enclosure.

== Further development ==
By 1990, a group of firms planned to proceed with the construction of an HTR-500, a successor of the THTR-300 with an up-rated thermal output of 1390 megawatts and electrical output of 550 megawatts. No new nuclear power plant was ever commissioned, however, as the nuclear phase-out in Germany affected research and development activities. Some high temperature reactor research eventually merged with the AVR consortium.

== See also ==
- Gas cooled fast reactor
- Pebble bed reactor
- Gas Turbine Modular Helium Reactor
- Anti-nuclear movement in Germany
