= High-temperature engineering test reactor =

Research reactor in Ōarai, Ibaraki, Japan

Coordinates: 36°15′58.8″N 140°32′50.8″E

The high-temperature engineering test reactor (HTTR) is a graphite-moderated gas-cooled research reactor in Ōarai, Ibaraki, Japan operated by the Japan Atomic Energy Agency. It uses long hexagonal fuel assemblies, unlike the competing pebble bed reactor designs.

HTTR first reached its full design power of 30 MW (thermal) in 1999. Other tests have shown that the core can reach temperatures sufficient for hydrogen production via the sulfur-iodine cycle.

== Technical details ==
The primary coolant is helium gas at a pressure of about 4 megapascals (580 psi), the inlet temperature of 395 °C (743 °F), and the outlet temperature of 850–950 °C (1,560–1,740 °F). The fuel is uranium oxide (enriched to an average of about 6%).

== See also ==
- Very-high-temperature reactor
- Hydrogen economy
