= Shidao Bay Nuclear Power Plant =

Nuclear plant in Shandong, China

- Official name: 石岛湾核电站
- Country: People's Republic of China
- Location: Rongcheng, Weihai, Shandong
- Coordinates: 36°58′20″N 122°31′44″E
- Status: Operational
- Construction began: 9 December 2012
- Commission date: 2021
- Construction cost: US$16 billion (units 1–7)
- Owners: China Huaneng Group; Shandong Shidao Bay Nuclear Power Co., Ltd (HSNPC); Tsinghua University
- Operator: Huaneng Shandong Shidao Bay Nuclear Power Company

Nuclear power station
- Reactor type: HTGR
- Cooling source: Yellow Sea

Power generation
- Units operational: 1 x 200 MW twin reactor 2 × 1500 MW
- Make and model: HTR-PM; HPR1000; CAP1400
- Units planned: 8 × 200 MW twin reactor 2 × 1134 MW
- Units under const.: 2 × 1134 MW
- Nameplate capacity: 3200 MW

External links
- Commons: Related media on Commons

Shidao Bay Nuclear Power Plant (simplified Chinese: 石岛湾核电站; traditional Chinese: 石島灣核電廠; pinyin: Shídǎo wān hédiàn chǎng), commonly known as Shidaowan, is a nuclear power plant in Shandong province, China. The site is located near the Xiqianjia village in Ningjin subdistrict, Rongcheng, Weihai, Shandong. The plant is located about 23 kilometres (14 mi) south of Rongcheng City, 14 kilometres (8.7 mi) northwest of Shidao, and 68 kilometres (42 mi) southeast of Weihai City.

The plant has the first fourth-generation nuclear reactors in the world: the HTR-PM, a high-temperature gas-cooled reactor (HTGR) concept (36°58′45″N 122°31′50″E). The plant will ultimately have ten 210 MW_{e} (megawatts electrical) units of this type. Each unit is made of two HTR-PM reactors driving a single 210 MW_{e} steam turbine.

The plant also hosts the construction of two 1500 MW_{e} CAP1400 pressurized water reactors (36°57′56″N 122°31′12″E), a design based on the AP1000 jointly developed by Westinghouse and China's State Nuclear Power Technology Corporation (SNPTC).

Shidao Bay nuclear power plant is a joint venture by China Huaneng Group, China Nuclear Engineering & Construction Group, and Tsinghua University. The total investment of 100 billion yuan (US$15.7 billion) and the 20-year construction plan makes it one of China's large nuclear projects.

== HTR-PM ==
In 2005, China announced its intention to scale up the HTR-10 experimental reactor for commercial power generation. The first two 250-MWt High-Temperature Reactor-Pebble-bed Modules (HTR-PM) will be installed at Shidao Bay, and together drive a steam turbine generating 200 MWe.

Originally to be started in 2011, the project was postponed after the Fukushima Daiichi nuclear disaster in Japan in March 2011. In 2009, it was planned to be finished in 2013. Construction finally began at the end of 2012, with the pouring of concrete basemat occurring in April 2014. The vessel was installed in 2016. It was expected to begin operating around 2017, later postponed to 2018. The pressure vessel head was installed in December 2017. Cold testing was completed in November 2020. Hot functional testing of the reactors began in January 2021, and operational start up is planned for late 2021. The first reactor went critical, marking the first criticality of a generation IV commercial nuclear power plant, in September 2021. Reactor two achieved first criticality in November 2021. Reactor one was connected to the state power grid and began producing power in December 2021 The HTR-PM project demonstrated it had reached "initial full power" in December 2022. The HTR-PM project finally entered commercial operation in December 2023. An updated larger power plant, HTR-PM600, is planned with a capacity of 600 MWe using six HTR-PM reactor units.

== Hualong One ==
In July 2024, first concrete was poured for Shidaowan 1, the first of four Hualong One reactors. In May 2025, first concrete was poured for Shidaowan 2.

== CAP1400 ==
In November 2006, State Power Investment Corporation (SPIC) introduced the AP1000, a third-generation pressurized water reactor design, from the U.S. company Westinghouse Electric Corporation. Since then China built four AP1000 units, two in the Sanmen Nuclear Power Station, and another two in the Haiyang Nuclear Power Plant.

China has been researching and developing its own version of the AP1000, the more powerful CAP1400, also referred to as Guohe One (Guo He One, Chinese: 国和; pinyin: guó hé, i.e. unity of the country).

Preparation work started in 2013 and Unit 1 construction started in 2018. Completion estimated in 2021.

In May 2016, the CAP1400 design has successfully passed the International Atomic Energy Agency's (IAEA) Generic Reactor Safety Review.

According to SPIC, the company is building two CAP1400 reactors in a demonstration project located in the Shidao Bay nuclear plant.

In March 2017, the Unit 1 first CAP1400 reactor pressure vessel hydraulic test was completed at the factory test site. The pressure vessel is the core equipment of the reactor and has a total weight of about 487 tons and a design life of 60 years.

On 30 June 2017, the Unit 1 first low-pressure module LP2 of the CAP1400 National Nuclear Demonstration Project Turbine, was completed by Dongfang Electric Group Dongfang Steam Turbine Co., Ltd. The CAP1400 steam turbine low-pressure rotor has a weight of 267 tons and the whole block weight is 749 tons. The last stage blades in the low pressure turbines are 1.828 metres (6.00 ft) tall. The LP2 steam turbine will help drive the CAP1400 1,520 MW generator.

In March 2022 it was announced that commercial operation of the two CAP1400 units is expected to commence in 2025.

== Reactor data ==
The Shidao Bay Nuclear Power Plant consist of two operational reactors (that drive one unit), two reactors under construction, and four planned future reactors.

Unit	Type / Model	Net power	Gross power	Thermal power	Start construction	First criticality	Grid connection	Commercial operation	Notes
Shidao Bay I	HTGR / HTR-PM	200 MW	211 MW	250+250 MW	9 December 2012	12 September 2021	20 December 2021	6 December 2023	
Shidao Bay Guohe-1	PWR / CAP1400	1500 MW	1550 MW	4040 MW	19 June 2019		31 October 2024		
Shidao Bay Guohe-2	PWR / CAP1400	1500 MW	1550 MW	4040 MW	21 April 2020		2025		
Phase I expansion
Shidaowan 1	HPR1000	1134 MW	1225 MW	3180 MW	28 July 2024			2029	
Shidaowan 2	HPR1000	1134 MW	1225 MW	3180 MW	8 May 2025				
Phase II
Shidaowan 3	HPR1000	1134 MW	1225 MW	3180 MW					
Shidaowan 4	HPR1000	1134 MW	1225 MW	3180 MW					

== See also ==
- Nuclear power in China
- List of commercial nuclear reactors § China
- Generation IV reactor
