= Xudabao Nuclear Power Plant =

Proposed nuclear power plant in Liaoning, China

- Country: People's Republic of China
- Location: Xingcheng, Huludao, Liaoning
- Coordinates: 40°21′5″N 120°32′45″E
- Construction began: 28 July 2021
- Construction cost: Unit 1 & 2: Over CNY48 billion (USD6.6 billion)
- Owners: China National Nuclear Corporation; Datang International Power Generation Company; State Development and Investment Corporation
- Operator: Liaoning Nuclear Power Company Ltd.

Nuclear power station
- Reactor type: CAP1000 PWR; VVER-1200 PWR

Power generation
- Units planned: 2 × 1000 MW
- Units under const.: 2 × 1000 MW, 2 × 1200 MW

The Xudabao Nuclear Power Plant, also known as Xudapu, is a nuclear power station under construction in Xudabao Village, Haibin County, Xingcheng, Huludao, on the coast of Liaoning province, in northeast China. It was initially planned to have six 1000-MW AP1000 or CAP1000 light water reactors, but the first two to start construction were changed to VVER-1200s.

China National Nuclear Corporation (CNNC) owns 70% of the project, along with Datang International Power Generation Company (20%), and State Development and Investment Corporation (10%).

Preliminary work on the site began in 2010, but no nuclear concrete pour was made, and works were suspended for several years after the 2011 Fukushima Daiichi nuclear disaster. In 2014, the National Nuclear Safety Administration (NNSA) granted approval for the first two units. In 2016, China Nuclear Industry 22 Construction Company (CNI22), a subsidiary of China Nuclear Engineering and Construction Corporation (CNECC) signed an EPC contract for the first two units.

CNNC and Atomstroyexport signed the detailed contract for the construction of two VVER-1200s (Xudabao 3 and 4) on 7 March 2019.

First concrete pour started on 28 July 2021, with Unit 3, which despite its designation is the first reactor at the site. Work on Unit 4 began in May 2022. Rosatom will supply the nuclear island; the turbine generators will be supplied by China. Commercial operation of both units is expected by 2028.

Work on Unit 1, the first CAP1000, began in November 2023. Work on Unit 2 began in July 2024.

In December 2024 the reactor vessel has been installed at Xudabao 4.

== Reactor data ==
The Xudabao Nuclear Power Plant consists of 4 reactors currently under construction.

Unit	Type	Net capacity	Gross capacity	Construction start	Operation start (planned)	Ref.
Phase 1
Xudabao 3	VVER-1200	1200 MW	1274 MW	28 July 2021	2027	
Xudabao 4	VVER-1200	1200 MW	1274 MW	19 May 2022	2028	
Phase 2
Xudabao 1	CAP1000	1000 MW	1290 MW	3 November 2023	2028	
Xudabao 2	CAP1000	1000 MW	1290 MW	17 July 2024	2029	

== See also ==
- Nuclear power in China
