= Haiyang Nuclear Power Plant =

Nuclear power plant in Shandong, China

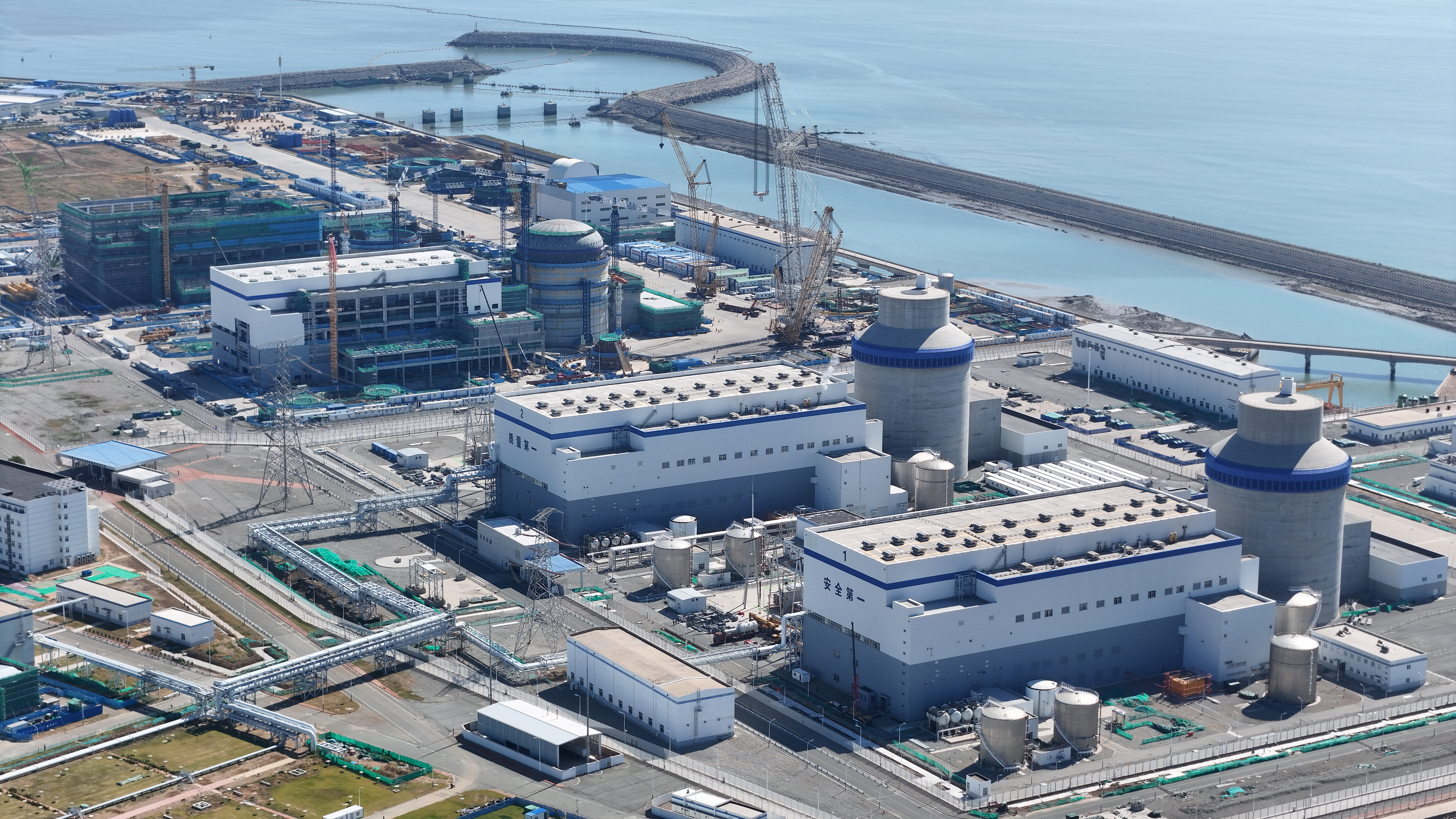
- Official name: 海阳核电站
- Country: China
- Location: Haiyang, Yantai, Shandong
- Coordinates: 36°42.5′N 121°23′E
- Status: Operational
- Construction began: 2009
- Commission date: 2018
- Construction cost: Unit 1 & 2: CNY 40 billion (estimated)
- Owner: State Power Investment Corporation (SPIC)
- Operators: Shandong Nuclear Power (subsidiary of SPIC)

Nuclear power station
- Reactor type: PWR
- Reactor supplier: Westinghouse
- Cooling source: Yellow Sea
- Thermal capacity: 2 × 3415 MW_{th}

Power generation
- Units operational: 2 × 1170 MW
- Make and model: Westinghouse AP1000
- Units under const.: 3 × 1161 MW
- Nameplate capacity: 2340 MW

External links
- Commons: Related media on Commons

Haiyang Nuclear Power Plant
- Simplified Chinese: 海阳核电站
- Traditional Chinese: 海陽核電站
Transcriptions
Standard Mandarin
- Hanyu Pinyin: Hǎi yáng hé diàn zhàn

Haiyang Nuclear Power Plant is a nuclear power plant in Haiyang, Shandong province, China. It is the second site to house AP1000 units, after the Sanmen Nuclear Power Station.

== History ==
Groundbreaking happened one month ahead of schedule on July 30, 2008. Construction of the first unit began in September 2009. Civil construction of Unit 1 was completed 29 March 2013. Fuel loading at Haiyang 1 began on June 22, 2018. First grid connection was on 17 August 2018. Unit 1 began commercial operation on 22 October 2018.

Construction of unit 2 started in June 2010, at that time the fourth Chinese AP1000 project together with the two units of the Sanmen NPP. Commercial operation began in January 2019, after having completed a full-power test run for a week (168 hours). Both units will provide together about 20 TWh of electricity to the grid of Shandong province.

As well as generating electricity, the reactors at Haiyang also power a district heating system.

On July 7, 2022, construction began on unit 3 after authorization had been granted.

== Reactor data ==
Unit	Type /Model	Net power	Gross power	Thermal power	Construction start	First criticality	Grid connection	Operation start	Notes
Phase I
Haiyang 1	PWR / AP1000	1170 MW	1250 MW	3415 MW	2009-09-24	2018-08-08	2018-08-17	2018-10-22	
Haiyang 2	PWR / AP1000	1170 MW	1250 MW	3415 MW	2010-06-20	2018-09-29	2018-10-13	2019-01-09	
Phase II
Haiyang 3	PWR / CAP1000	1161 MW	1253 MW	3400 MW	2022-07-07				
Haiyang 4	PWR / CAP1000	1161 MW	1253 MW	3400 MW	2023-04-22				
Phase III
Haiyang 5	PWR / CAP1000	1161 MW	1253 MW	3400 MW	2026-4-16				
Haiyang 6	PWR / CAP1000	1161 MW	1253 MW	3400 MW	2027-2				

== District Heating ==
In September 2020, the plant's owner and a thermal company instigated a plan to heat all of Haiyang city via heat exchange. Two months later, 700,000 square meters of housing had been heated and the project was en route for completion in its entirety in 2021. The switch to clean energy is expected to eliminate more than 180,000 tonnes of fossil fuel emissions each year, and the corresponding reduction in air pollution is anticipated to save about 600 lives annually. By November 2022, the plant used 345 MW-thermal effect to heat 200,000 homes, replacing 12 coal heating plants.

== See also ==
- Nuclear power in China
