= Guangxi Bailong Nuclear Power Project =

Proposed nuclear power plant in Guangxi, China

- Country: People's Republic of China
- Location: Bailong, Jiangshan Peninsula, Gangkou, Fangchenggang, Guangxi
- Coordinates: 21°32′43″N 108°17′38″E
- Status: Under construction
- Operator: Guangxi Nuclear Power Company

Nuclear power station
- Reactor type: CAP1000; CAP1400

Power generation
- Units planned: 4 × 1500 MW
- Units under const.: 2 × 1250 MW
- Nameplate capacity: 8500 MW

Guangxi Bailong Nuclear Power Project (simplified Chinese: 广西白龙核电项目; traditional Chinese: 廣西白龍核電項目; pinyin: Guǎngxī bái lóng hédiàn xiàngmù) is a nuclear power plant proposed in Fangchenggang, near Bailong Village ( 白龙村 ), autonomous region of Guangxi (Guangxi Zhuang Autonomous Region) in China. A total of six reactors are planned to operate at the Bailong site. Units 1 and 2 are both CAP1000s, units 3–6 are planned to be based on CAP1400 reactors.

The plant is located about 24 kilometres from the border with Vietnam, about 30 km (19 mi) from Fangchenggang Nuclear Power Plant.

The signing ceremony for the construction of the first phase was held in Nanning in July 2006 with construction expected to commence in 2008. Total project cost was estimated at 390 billion yuan, or about US$61.1 billion at the 2021 exchange rate.

Excavation work for the first unit began in November 2024. The first pair of reactors are expected to cost 40 billion yuan (US$5.6 billion) and take 56 months to construct.

Construction of the unit 1 began in December 2025.. The first concrete pour has been completed for the basemate of the conventional island of unit 2 in August 12 2026.

== Reactor data ==
The Guangxi Bailong Nuclear Power Plant consists of 6 reactors planned.

Unit	Type	Construction start	Operation start	Notes
Phase I
Bailong 1	CAP-1000	22 Dec 2025		
Bailong 2	CAP-1000	27 Sept 2026		
Phase II
Bailong 3	CAP-1400			
Bailong 4	CAP-1400			
Bailong 5	CAP-1400			
Bailong 6	CAP-1400			

== See also ==
- Generation III reactor
