= AP1000 =

American nuclear power plant

Computer generated image of AP1000

The AP1000 (Advanced Passive 1000) is a nuclear power plant designed and sold by Westinghouse Electric Company. The plant is a pressurized water reactor with improved use of passive nuclear safety and many design features intended to lower its capital cost and improve its economics.

The design traces its history to the Westinghouse 4-loop SNUPPS design, which was produced in various locations around the world. (Note: System 80 was a similar vintage nuclear steam supply system made by Combustion Engineering.) Further development of the 4-loop reactor and the passively cooled containment initially led to the AP600 concept, with a smaller 600 to 700 MWe output, but this saw limited interest. In order to compete with other designs that were scaling up in size in order to improve capital costs, the design re-emerged as the AP1000 and found a number of design wins at this larger size.

Seventeen AP1000s are currently in operation or under construction. Four are in operation at two sites in China, two at Sanmen Nuclear Power Station and two at Haiyang Nuclear Power Plant. As of 2019, all four Chinese reactors were completed and connected to the grid, and as of 2026, eleven more are under construction. (Note: Haiyang-3, Haiyang-4, Lianjiang-1, Lianjiang-2, Sanmen-3, Sanmen-4, Xudapu-1, Xudapu-2, Lufeng-1, Lufeng-2, and Bailong-1) Two are in operation at the Vogtle Electric Generating Plant near Augusta, Georgia, in the United States, with Vogtle 3 having come online in July 2023, and Vogtle 4 in April 2024. Construction at Vogtle suffered numerous delays and cost overruns. Construction of two additional reactors at Virgil C. Summer Nuclear Generating Station near Columbia, South Carolina, led to Westinghouse's bankruptcy in 2017 and the cancellation of construction at that site. It was reported in January 2025 by The Wall Street Journal and The State that Santee Cooper, the sole owner of the stored parts and unfinished construction, is exploring construction and financing partners to finish construction of these two reactors. The need for large amounts of electricity for data centers is said to be the driving factor for their renewed interest.

Twenty-four more AP1000s are currently being planned, with six in India, nine in Ukraine, three in Poland, two in Bulgaria, and four in the United States.

China is currently developing more advanced versions and owns their patent rights. The first AP1000 began operations in China at Sanmen, where Unit 1 became the first AP1000 to achieve criticality in June 2018, and was connected to the grid the next month. Further builds in China will be based on the modified CAP1000 and CAP1400 designs.

== History ==
=== Previous work ===
The AP1000 design traces its history to two previous designs, the AP600 and the System 80.

The System 80 design was created by Combustion Engineering and featured a two-loop cooling system with a single steam generator paired with two reactor coolant pumps in each loop that makes it simpler and less expensive than systems which pair a single reactor coolant pump with a steam generator in each of two, three, or four loops. Three completed reactors in the US and another four in South Korea made it the most successful Generation II+ design.

ABB Group bought Combustion Engineering in 1990 and introduced the System 80+, with a number of design changes and safety improvements. As part of a series of mergers, purchases, and divestitures by ABB, in 2000 the design was purchased by Westinghouse Electric Company, who had itself been purchased in 1999 by British Nuclear Fuels Ltd (BNFL).

Through the 1990s, Westinghouse had been working on a new design known as the AP600 with a design power of about 600 MWe. This was part of the United States Department of Energy's Advanced Light Water Reactor program that worked on a series of Generation III reactor designs. In contrast to Generation II designs, the AP600 was much simpler, with a huge reduction in the total number of parts, and especially pumps. It was also passively safe, a key feature of Gen III designs.

The AP600 was at the small end of the reactor scale. Smaller plants are periodically introduced because they can be used in a wider variety of markets where a larger reactor is simply too powerful to serve the local market. The downside of such designs is that the construction time, and thus cost, does not differ significantly compared to larger designs, so these smaller designs often have less attractive economics. The AP600 addressed this through modular construction and aimed to go from first concrete to fuel load in 36 months. In spite of these attractive features, Westinghouse had no sales of the AP600.

With the purchase of the company by BNFL and its merger with ABB, a design combining the features of the System 80+ with the AP600 started as the AP1000. BNFL in turn sold Westinghouse Electric to Toshiba in 2005.

=== AP1000 ===
In December 2005, the Nuclear Regulatory Commission (NRC) approved the final design certification for the AP1000. This meant that prospective US builders could apply for a Combined Construction and Operating License before construction starts, the validity of which is conditional upon the plant being built as designed, and that each AP1000 should be identical. Its design is the first Generation III+ reactor to receive final design approval from the NRC. In 2008 China started building four units of the AP1000's 2005-design.

In December 2011, the NRC approved construction of the first US plant to use the design. On February 9, 2012, the NRC approved the construction of two new reactors.

In 2016 and 2017 cost overruns constructing AP1000 plants in the U.S. caused Westinghouse's owner Toshiba to write down its investment in Westinghouse by "several billion" dollars. On February 14, 2017, Toshiba delayed filing financial results, and Toshiba chairman Shigenori Shiga, formerly chairman of Westinghouse, resigned. On March 24, 2017, Toshiba announced that Westinghouse Electric Company will file for Chapter 11 bankruptcy because of US$9 billion of losses from nuclear reactor construction projects, which may impact the future of the AP1000. Westinghouse emerged from bankruptcy in August 2018.

Date	Milestone
January 27, 2006	NRC issues the final design certification rule (DCR)
March 10, 2006	NRC issues revised FDA for Revision 15 of the Westinghouse design
May 26, 2007	Westinghouse applies to amend the DCR (Revision 16)
September 22, 2008	Westinghouse updated its application
October 14, 2008	Westinghouse provides a corrected set for Revision 17 of the design
December 1, 2010	Westinghouse submits Revision 18 of the design
June 13, 2011	Westinghouse submits Revision 19 of the design
December 30, 2011	NRC issues the final DC amendment final rule
September 21, 2018	Commissioning of the first AP1000 at the Sanmen Nuclear Power Station

== Design specifications ==
The AP1000 is a pressurized water reactor with two cooling loops, planned to produce a net power output of 1,117 MW_{e}. It is an evolutionary improvement on the AP600, essentially a more powerful model with roughly the same footprint.

A design objective was to be less expensive to build than other Generation III reactor designs, by both using existing technology, and needing less equipment than competing designs that have three or four cooling loops. The design decreases the number of components, including pipes, wires, and valves. Standardization and type-licensing should also help reduce the time and cost of construction. Because of its simplified design compared to a Westinghouse generation II PWR, the AP1000 has:

- 50% fewer safety-related valves
- 35% fewer pumps
- 80% less safety-related piping
- 85% less control cable
- 45% less seismic building volume

The AP1000 design is considerably more compact in land usage than most existing PWRs, and uses under a fifth of the concrete and rebar reinforcing of older designs. Probabilistic risk assessment was used in the design of the plants. This enabled minimization of risks, and calculation of the overall safety of the plant. According to the NRC, the plants will be orders of magnitude safer than those in the last study, NUREG-1150. The AP1000 has a maximum core damage frequency of 5.09 × 10^{−7} per plant per year. Used fuel produced by the AP1000 can be stored indefinitely in water on the plant site. Aged used fuel may also be stored in above-ground dry cask storage, in the same manner as the currently operating fleet of US power reactors.

Power reactors of all types continue to produce heat from radioactive decay products even after the main reaction is shut down, so it is necessary to remove this heat to avoid meltdown of the reactor core. In the AP1000, Westinghouse's Passive Core Cooling System uses a tank of water situated above the reactor. When the passive cooling system is activated, the water flows by gravity to the top of the reactor where it evaporates to remove heat. The system uses multiple explosively-operated and DC operated valves which must operate within the first 30 minutes. This is designed to happen even if the reactor operators take no action. The electrical system required for initiating the passive systems doesn't rely on external or diesel power and the valves don't rely on hydraulic or compressed air systems. The design is intended to passively remove heat for 72 hours, after which its gravity drain water tank must be topped up for as long as cooling is required. The reactor uses canned motor pumps that are hermetically sealed, use no reactor coolant pump seals and are mounted directly on the bottom of the steam generators. This reduces the amount of large diameter primary loop piping.

Revision 15 of the AP1000 design has an unusual containment structure which has received approval by the NRC, after a Safety Evaluation Report, and a Design Certification Rule. Revisions 17, 18, and 19 were also approved.

== Design disputes ==
In April 2010, some environmental organizations called on the NRC to investigate possible limitations in the AP1000 reactor design. These groups appealed to three federal agencies to suspend the licensing process because they believed containment in the new design is weaker than existing reactors.

In April 2010, Arnold Gundersen, a nuclear engineer commissioned by several anti-nuclear groups, released a report which explored a hazard associated with the possible rusting through of the containment structure steel liner. In the AP1000 design, the liner and the concrete are separated, and if the steel rusts through, "there is no backup containment behind it" according to Gundersen. If the dome rusted through the design would expel radioactive contaminants and the plant "could deliver a dose of radiation to the public that is 10 times higher than the N.R.C. limit" according to Gundersen. Vaughn Gilbert, a spokesman for Westinghouse, has disputed Gundersen's assessment, stating that the AP1000's steel containment vessel is three-and-a-half to five times thicker than the liners used in current designs, and that corrosion would be readily apparent during routine inspection.

Edwin Lyman, a senior staff scientist at the Union of Concerned Scientists, has challenged specific cost-saving design choices made for both the AP1000 and ESBWR, another new design. Lyman is concerned about the strength of the steel containment vessel and the concrete shield building around the AP1000, claiming its containment vessel does not have sufficient safety margins.

John Ma, a senior structural engineer at the NRC was quoted on his stance about the AP1000 nuclear reactor.

In 2009, the NRC made a safety change related to the events of September 11, ruling that all plants be designed to withstand the direct hit from a plane. To meet the new requirement, Westinghouse encased the AP1000 buildings concrete walls in steel plates. Last year Ma, a member of the NRC since it was formed in 1974, filed the first "non-concurrence" dissent of his career after the NRC granted the design approval. In it Ma argues that some parts of the steel skin are so brittle that the "impact energy" from a plane strike or storm driven projectile could shatter the wall. A team of engineering experts hired by Westinghouse disagreed...

In 2010, following Ma's initial concerns, the NRC questioned the durability of the AP1000 reactor's original shield building in the face of severe external events such as earthquakes, hurricanes, and airplane collisions. In response to these concerns Westinghouse prepared a modified design. This modified design satisfied the NRC, with the exception of Ma, hence the "non-concurrence". In contrast to the NRC's decision, Ma believed that the computer codes used to analyze the modified design were not precise enough and some of the materials used were too brittle.

The NRC completed the overall design certification review for the amended AP1000 in September 2011.

In May 2011, US government regulators found additional problems with the design of the shield building of the new reactors. The chairman of the Nuclear Regulatory Commission said that: computations submitted by Westinghouse about the building's design appeared to be wrong and "had led to more questions."; the company had not used a range of possible temperatures for calculating potential seismic stresses on the shield building in the event of, for example, an earthquake; and that the commission was asking Westinghouse not only to fix its calculations but also to explain why it submitted flawed information in the first place. Westinghouse said that the items the commission was asking for were not "safety significant".

In November 2011, Arnold Gundersen published a further report on behalf of the AP1000 Oversight Group, which includes Friends of the Earth and Mothers against Tennessee River Radiation. The report highlighted six areas of major concern and unreviewed safety questions requiring immediate technical review by the NRC. The report concluded that certification of the AP1000 should be delayed until the original and current "unanswered safety questions" raised by the AP1000 Oversight Group are resolved.

In 2012, Ellen Vancko, from the Union of Concerned Scientists, said that "the Westinghouse AP1000 has a weaker containment, less redundancy in safety systems, and fewer safety features than current reactors". In response to Ms. Vancko's concerns, climate policies author and retired nuclear engineer Zvi J. Doron, replied that the AP1000's safety is enhanced by fewer active components, not compromised as Ms. Vancko suggests. As in direct contrast to currently operating reactors, the AP1000 has been designed around the concept of passive nuclear safety. In October 2013, Li Yulun, a former vice-president of China National Nuclear Corporation (CNNC), raised concerns over the safety standards of the delayed AP1000 third-generation nuclear power plant being built in Sanmen, due to the constantly changing, and consequently untested, design. Citing a lack of operating history, he also questioned the manufacturer's assertion that the AP1000 reactor's "primary system canned motor pumps" were "maintenance-free" over 60 years, the assumed life of the reactor and noted that the expansion from 600 to 1,000 megawatts has not yet been commercially proven.

== Chinese design extensions ==
In 2008 and 2009, Westinghouse made agreements to work with the Chinese State Nuclear Power Technology Corporation (SNPTC) and other institutes to develop a larger design, the CAP1400 of 1,500 MW_{e} capacity, possibly followed by a 1,700 MW_{e} design. China will own the patent rights for these larger designs. Exporting the new larger units may be possible with Westinghouse's cooperation.

In September 2014, the Chinese nuclear regulator approved the design safety analysis following a 17-month review. In May 2015 the CAP1400 design passed an International Atomic Energy Agency's Generic Reactor Safety Review.

In December 2009, a Chinese joint venture was set up to build an initial CAP1400 near the HTR-PM at Shidao Bay Nuclear Power Plant. In 2015, site preparation started, and approval to progress was expected by the end of the year. In March 2017, the first CAP1400 reactor pressure vessel passed pressure tests. Equipment for the CAP1400 is being manufactured, and as of 2020 preliminary construction is underway.

In February 2019, the Shanghai Nuclear Engineering Research & Design Institute announced that it had begun the conceptual design process for the CAP1700.

== Construction plans or potential operators ==
List of operational, planned, and closed AP1000 and CAP1000 installations
Power plant		Reactors		Status	Notes	Ref
Unit	Country	Models	Gen	Status	Notes	Ref
Sanmen-1	China	AP1000		Operational		
Sanmen-2	China	AP1000		Operational		
Sanmen-3	China	CAP1000		Under construction		
Sanmen-4	China	CAP1000		Under construction		
Haiyang-1	China	AP1000		Operational		
Haiyang-2	China	AP1000		Operational		
Haiyang-3	China	CAP1000		Under construction		
Haiyang-4	China	CAP1000		Under construction		
Haiyang-5	China	CAP1000		Under construction		
Haiyang-6	China	CAP1000		Approved		
Bailong-1	China	CAP1000		Under construction		
Bailong-2	China	CAP1000		Under construction		
Haixing 1	China	CAP1000		Planned		
Haixing 2	China	CAP1000		Planned		
Lianjiang 1	China	CAP1000		Under construction		
Lianjiang 2	China	CAP1000		Under construction		
Lufeng 1	China	CAP1000		Under construction		
Lufeng 2	China	CAP1000		Under construction		
Pengze 1	China	CAP1000		Planned		
Pengze 2	China	CAP1000		Planned		
Taohuajiang 1	China	CAP1000		Planned		
Taohuajiang 2	China	CAP1000		Planned		
Taohuajiang 3	China	CAP1000		Planned		
Taohuajiang 4	China	CAP1000		Planned		
Xudapu 1	China	CAP1000		Under construction		
Xudapu 2	China	CAP1000		Under construction		
Xudapu 5	China	CAP1000		Planned		
Xudapu 6	China	CAP1000		Planned		
Xianning 1	China	CAP1000		Planned		
Xianning 2	China	CAP1000		Planned		
İğneada (4X)	Turkey	AP1000/ CAP1000		Proposed		
Vogtle-3	United States	AP1000		Operational		
Vogtle-4	United States	AP1000		Operational		
Virgil C. Summer-2	United States	AP1000		Under construction		
Virgil C. Summer-3	United States	AP1000		Under construction		
Khmelnytskyi-5	Ukraine	AP1000		Planned		
Khmelnytskyi-6	Ukraine	AP1000		Planned		
Kozloduy (2X)	Bulgaria	AP1000		Planned		
Bohunice	Slovakia	AP1000		Planned		
Lubiatowo-Kopalino	Poland	AP1000		Planned		

=== China ===
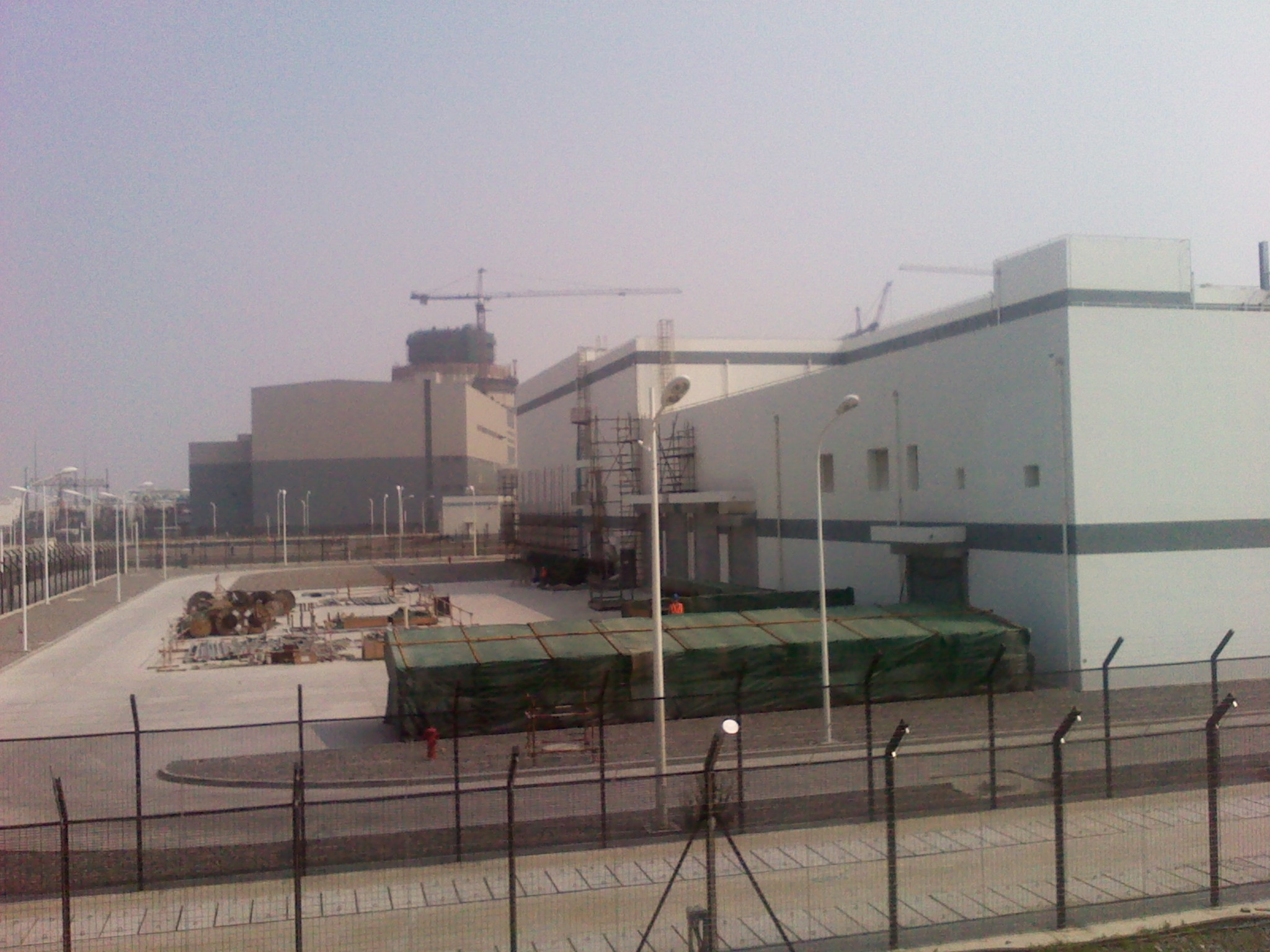
Sanmen Nuclear Power Plant, the world's first AP1000, was commissioned in 2018.

Four AP1000 reactors have been constructed in China, two at Sanmen Nuclear Power Plant in Zhejiang, and two at Haiyang Nuclear Power Plant in Shandong. The Sanmen 1 & 2 AP1000s were connected to the grid on July 2, 2018, and August 24, 2018, respectively. Haiyang 1 started commercial operation on October 22, 2018, and Haiyang 2 on January 9, 2019.

In 2014, China First Heavy Industries manufactured the first domestically produced AP1000 reactor pressure vessel, for the second AP1000 unit of Sanmen Nuclear Power Station.

The first four AP1000s to be built are to an earlier revision of the design without a strengthened containment structure to provide improved protection against an aircraft crash. China had officially adopted the AP1000 as a standard for inland nuclear projects. Following Westinghouse's bankruptcy in 2017, China decided in 2019 to build the domestically designed Hualong One rather than the AP1000 at Zhangzhou.

After 2019, all plans for future AP1000 units were superseded by CAP1000 units, which are a local standardization of the AP1000 design, transitional to the CAP1400. It is said to have reduced cost and improved operation and maintenance attributes.

As of 2021, site preparations have been done for Haiyang, Lufeng, Sanmen, and Xudabao for the construction of eight additional CAP1000 units. However, most of these projects are at a standstill, as construction of all CAP-1000 units has been slowed down significantly.

Construction of the first CAP1000 unit at Guangxi Bailong Nuclear Power Project began in January 2026.

At the Xudabao site, construction of two VVER-1200 units for Xudabao 3 & 4 was started in 2021 while the planned CAP1000 units for phases 1 & 2 are still on hold. On 20 April 2022, the construction of Haiyang 3 & 4 and Sanmen 3 & 4 was approved by the State Council. However, Lufeng 5, using a Hualong One unit, was decided to be built first instead of the CAP1000 units for Lufeng 1-4 which had already been approved by the National Development and Reform Commission. On 14 September 2022, the State Council approved construction of Lianjiang 1 & 2.

=== Turkey ===
In October 2015 it was announced that technology for the İğneada Nuclear Power Plant in Turkey will come from US based firm Westinghouse Electric Company in the form of two AP1000 and two Chinese CAP1400.

In 2016, the Minister of Energy and Natural Resources of the Republic of Turkey, Berat Albayrak, inspected the AP 1000 Shandong Haiyang Nuclear Power Plant, which belongs to the China National State Nuclear Technology Corporation (SNPTC), a subsidiary of the China State Electricity Investment Corporation (SPIC).

=== United States ===
Two reactors have been brought online at the Vogtle Electric Generating Plant in the state of Georgia (Units 3 & 4).

In South Carolina, two units were being constructed at the Virgil C. Summer Nuclear Generating Station (Units 2 & 3). The project was abandoned in July 2017, 4 years after it began, due to Westinghouse's recent bankruptcy, major cost overruns, significant delays, and other issues. The project's primary shareholder (SCANA) initially favored a plan to abandon development of Unit 3, while completing Unit 2. The plan was dependent on approval of a minority shareholder (Santee Cooper). Santee Cooper's board voted to cease all construction resulting in termination of the entire project.

All four reactors were identical and the two projects ran in parallel, with the first two reactors (Vogtle 3 and Summer 2) planned to be commissioned in 2019 and the remaining two (Vogtle 4 and Summer 3) in 2020. After Westinghouse filed for bankruptcy protection on March 29, 2017, the construction has stalled.

On April 9, 2008, Georgia Power Company reached a contract agreement with Westinghouse and Shaw for two AP1000 reactors to be built at Vogtle. The contract represents the first agreement for new nuclear development since the Three Mile Island accident in 1979. The license request for the Vogtle site is based on revision 18 of the AP1000 design. On February 16, 2010, President Obama announced $8.33 billion in federal loan guarantees to construct the two AP1000 units at the Vogtle plant. The cost of building the two reactors was projected to be $14 billion, but has since increased to $30B with only one reactor online and the second remaining under construction. Georgia Power, which owns 45.7% of Vogtle, delayed the projected in-service dates to the fourth quarter of 2023, or first quarter of 2024, for Unit 4.

Environmental groups opposed to the licensing of the two new AP1000 reactors to be built at Vogtle filed a new petition in April 2011 asking the Nuclear Regulatory Commission's commission to suspend the licensing process until more is known about the evolving Fukushima I nuclear accidents. In February 2012, nine environmental groups filed a collective challenge to the certification of the Vogtle reactor design and in March they filed a challenge to the Vogtle license. In May 2013, the U.S. Court of Appeals ruled in favor of the Nuclear Regulatory Commission (NRC).

In February 2012, the US Nuclear Regulatory Commission approved the two proposed reactors at the Vogtle plant.

For VC Summer, a delay of at least one year and extra costs of $1.2 billion were announced in October 2014, largely due to fabrication delays. Unit 2 was then expected to be substantially complete in late 2018 or early 2019, with unit 3 about a year later.

In October 2013, US energy secretary Ernest Moniz announced that China was to supply components to the US nuclear power plants under construction as part of a bilateral co-operation agreement between the two countries. Since China's State Nuclear Power Technology Corporation (SNPTC) acquired Westinghouse's AP1000 technology in 2006, it has developed a manufacturing supply chain capable of supplying international power projects. Industry analysts have highlighted a number of problems facing China's expansion in the nuclear market including continued gaps in their supply chain, coupled with Western fears of political interference and Chinese inexperience in the economics of nuclear power.

On July 31, 2017, after an extensive review into the costs of constructing Units 2 and 3, South Carolina Electric and Gas decided to stop construction of the reactors at VC Summer and will file a Petition for Approval of Abandonment with the Public Service Commission of South Carolina.

On October 14, 2022, Georgia Power announced that loading of nuclear fuel at Vogtle Unit 3 had begun.

On April 1, 2023, Georgia Power announced that Vogtle Unit 3 had made a connection to the grid and began supplying electricity for the first time, and on May 29, Unit 3 reached its maximum designed power output.

Hot functional testing on Vogtle Unit 4 was completed on May 1, 2023. It went into commercial operation in March 2024.

In 2025, Fermi America signed an agreement with Doosan Enerbility, a South Korean nuclear equipment firm to deploy four Westinghouse AP1000 nuclear reactors as part of its data center development in Amarillo, Texas.

=== Ukraine ===
On August 31, 2021, the head of SE NNEGC Energoatom Petro Kotin and the President and chief executive officer of Westinghouse Patrick Fragman signed a memorandum of cooperation for building Westinghouse AP1000 reactors in Ukraine. The contract was signed on November 22, 2021. The memorandum and contract between the two companies concerns the completion of unit 4 of the Khmelnytskyi Nuclear Power Plant with the AP1000 as well as four more power units of other nuclear power plants in Ukraine.

=== Poland ===
Poland plans to build three AP1000 reactors in Choczewo near the Baltic Sea, the site is called Lubiatowo-Kopalino. The total investment costs of the project are estimated to be about EUR 42 billion (USD 47 billion as of end of 2025).

=== Bulgaria ===
Bulgaria plans to build two AP1000 reactors in Kozloduy Nuclear Power Plant.

=== Slovakia ===
Slovakia plans to build a single AP1000 unit at the Bohunice Nuclear Power Plant as a replacement for the decommissioned VVER440 (230 type) units at the V1 plant.

== Failed bid or ventures ==
=== India ===
In June 2016, the US and India agreed to build six AP1000 reactors in India as part of civil nuclear deal signed by both countries. Westinghouse's parent company Toshiba decided in 2017 to withdraw from the construction of nuclear power plants, following financial difficulties, leaving the proposed agreement in doubt. During a visit to India in February 2020 by U.S. President Donald Trump, Westinghouse was expected to sign a new agreement with state-run Nuclear Power Corporation of India for the supply of six nuclear reactors. However, because of disagreements over liability and layout, this did not take place.

=== United Kingdom ===
In December 2013, Toshiba, through its Westinghouse subsidiary, purchased a 60% share of NuGeneration, with the intention of building three AP1000s at Moorside near the Sellafield nuclear reprocessing site in Cumbria, England, with a target first operation date of 2024.

On March 28, 2017, the Office for Nuclear Regulation (ONR, UK) issued a Design Acceptance Confirmation for the AP1000 design, stating that 51 issues identified in 2011 had received an adequate response. However, the following day the designer, Westinghouse, filed for Chapter 11 bankruptcy in the U.S. because of $9 billion of losses from its nuclear reactor construction projects, mostly the construction of four AP1000 reactors in the U.S. In 2018, following an unsuccessful attempt to sell NuGeneration, Toshiba decided to liquidate the company and abandon the project.

== Operations ==
In March 2019, Sanmen Unit 2 was shut down because of a reactor coolant pump defect. A replacement pump has been shipped from the U.S. by Curtiss-Wright. There have been previous problems with these pumps, with several pumps returned from China. The pumps are the largest hermetically sealed pumps used in a nuclear reactor. Westinghouse and Curtiss-Wright are in a financial dispute over responsibility for the costs of pump delivery delays.

== See also ==
- Nuclear safety in the United States
- Nuclear power in the United States
- Nuclear power in China
- Nuclear power in the United Kingdom
- Nuclear power in Bulgaria
- Economics of nuclear power plants
- Nuclear Power 2010 Program
