= Lufeng Nuclear Power Plant =

Chinese nuclear power plant

- Country: China
- Location: Lufeng, Guangdong
- Coordinates: 22°45′N 115°48′E
- Status: Under construction
- Construction began: 8 September 2022
- Owners: CGN Lufeng Nuclear Power Co., Ltd

Nuclear power station
- Reactor type: PWR

Power generation
- Units planned: 2 × 1160 MW
- Units under const.: 2 × 1116, 2 × 1160 MW

The Lufeng Nuclear Power Plant (Chinese: 陆丰核电站) is a nuclear reactor under construction in the Guangdong province of eastern China. It is planned to house 6 pressurized water reactors (PWRs).

CGN Lufeng Nuclear Power Corporation has been working on developing a nuclear plant in Lufeng, Shanwei since 2013. The National Development and Reform Commission (NDRC) approved the plant in 2014, starting with two AP1000 reactors. The National Nuclear Safety Administration (NNSA) gave its approval in 2015. In April 2022, the government approved the construction of two Hualong One reactors, which were designated Units 5 and 6.

== Construction ==
Construction of the first unit began on 8 September 2022 and construction of the second unit on 26 August 2023. The first unit is expected to begin operation in 2028, and the second unit in 2029.

Construction of the first CAP1000 unit began on 24 February 2025. and construction of the second CAP1000 unit began in December 2025.

== Reactor data ==
Unit	Type	Net Capacity	Gross Capacity	Construction start	Operation start (planned)	Notes
Phase I
Lufeng 5	Hualong One	1116 MW	1200 MW	8 Sept 2022	2028	
Lufeng 6	Hualong One	1116 MW	1200 MW	26 Aug 2023	2029	
Phase II
Lufeng 1	CAP1000	1160 MW		24 Feb 2025	2030	
Lufeng 2	CAP1000	1160 MW		22 Dec 2025	2030	
Lufeng 3	CAP1000	1160 MW				
Lufeng 4	CAP1000	1160 MW				

== See also ==
- Nuclear power in China
