= Laiyang Nuclear Power Plant =

Proposed nuclear power plant in Shandong, China

Shandong Laiyang Nuclear Power Project
- Country: People's Republic of China
- Location: Tuanwang Town, Laiyang City, Yantai, Shandong
- Status: Under construction
- Operator: Laiyang Nuclear Power Company

Nuclear power station
- Reactor type: CAP1400

Power generation
- Units planned: 4 × 1543 MW
- Units under const.: 2 × 1543 MW
- Nameplate capacity: 9258 MW

The Shandong Laiyang Nuclear Power Project (simplified Chinese: 莱阳核电站; traditional Chinese: 萊陽核電廠; pinyin: Láiyáng hédiànzhàn) is a facility currently in the planning stages in mainland China. Located in Tuanwang Town, Laiyang City (under the jurisdiction of Yantai City, Shandong Province), the project is planned to host six "Guohe One" (CAP1400) third-generation nuclear power units. It will have an installed capacity of approximately 9.26 million kilowatts and a total investment of about 128.3 billion yuan. The plant is situated approximately 20 kilometers from the nearest coastal waters, Dingzi Bay. Each unit will be equipped with a large natural-draft cooling tower, and auxiliary facilities—such as seawater intake and discharge systems and a seawater desalination plant—will be constructed outside the main plant area.

== Construction History ==
On June 25, 2018, a symposium regarding central state-owned enterprises supporting Shandong's transition from old to new growth drivers was held in Jinan, Shandong; the State Power Investment Corporation (SPIC) announced plans to advance preliminary work on new nuclear power plant sites. In June 2022, the National Energy Administration issued the "Minutes of the Symposium on Preliminary Work for the Shandong Laiyang Nuclear Power Project," granting approval for the project to proceed with preliminary work. On December 30, 2022, the project owner, SPIC Laiyang Nuclear Energy Co., Ltd., was officially inaugurated. Shandong Province's 2025 Government Work Report stated the goal of securing approval for nuclear power projects, including Phase I of the Laiyang plant.

Phase I of the project comprises Units 1 and 2, with each unit having a rated capacity of 1.543 million kilowatts. In early June 2026, China Nuclear Industry Fifth Construction Co., Ltd. won the bid—valued at 3.189 billion yuan—for the nuclear island installation of the Laiyang Phase I project. The plan involves constructing two CAP1400 pressurized water reactor units (each with a capacity exceeding one million kilowatts). The contract duration is tentatively set at 66 months, with a 12-month interval between the two units. The schedule for Unit 1 runs from the First Concrete Date (FCD) to the point of readiness for commercial operation (FCD + 54 months); Unit 2 follows with a 12-month lag, starting at FCD + 12 months (relative to Unit 1) and reaching commercial readiness at FCD + 66 months. Construction was authorised on 31 July 2026.

== Reactor data ==
The Laiyang Nuclear Power Plant consists of 6 reactors planned.

Unit	Type	Construction start	Operation start	Notes
Phase I
Unit 1	CAP-1400	2026		
Unit 2	CAP-1400	2027		
Phase II
Unit 3	CAP-1400	Proposed		
Unit 4	CAP-1400	Proposed		
Unit 5	CAP-1400	Proposed		
Unit 6	CAP-1400	Proposed		

== See also ==
- Generation III reactor
