= CAP1400 =

Chinese nuclear reactor type

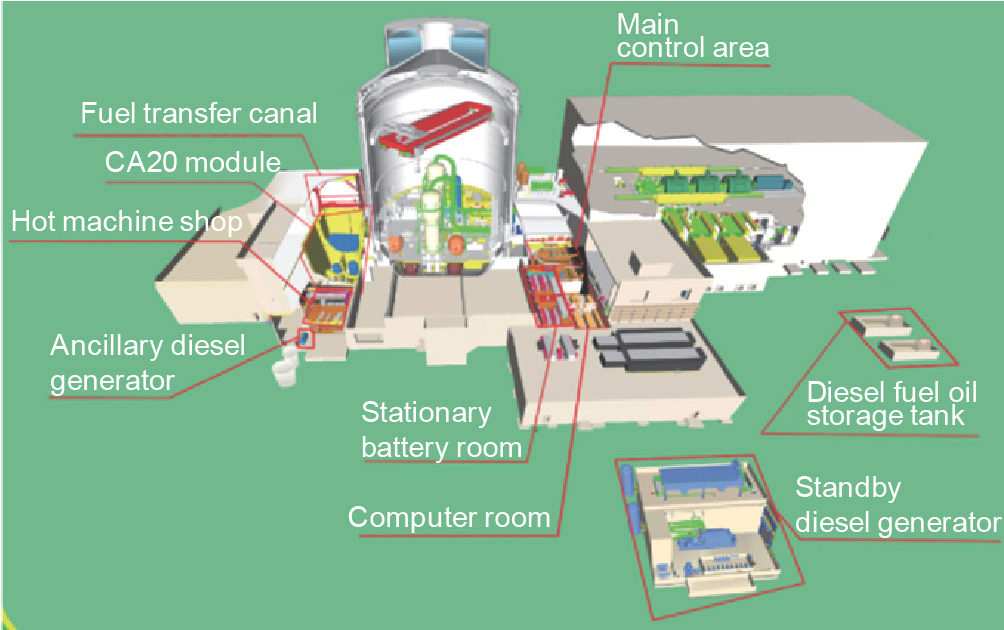
- General layout of CAP-1400
- Generation: Generation III+ reactor
- Reactor concept: Pressurized water reactor
- Status: 2 operation + 4 in plan

Main parameters of the reactor core
- Fuel (fissile material): ^{235}U (LEU)
- Fuel state: Solid
- Neutron energy spectrum: Thermal
- Primary control method: Control rods
- Primary moderator: Water
- Primary coolant: Liquid (light water)

Reactor usage
- Primary use: Generation of electricity
- Power (thermal): 4040 MW_{th}
- Power (electric): ~1500 MW_{el}

The CAP1400, later renamed Guohe One, is a Chinese Generation III+ reactor Pressurized water reactor developed by the State Power Investment Corporation. It was based on Westinghouse AP1000 design but with full Chinese intellectual property rights.

== Design ==
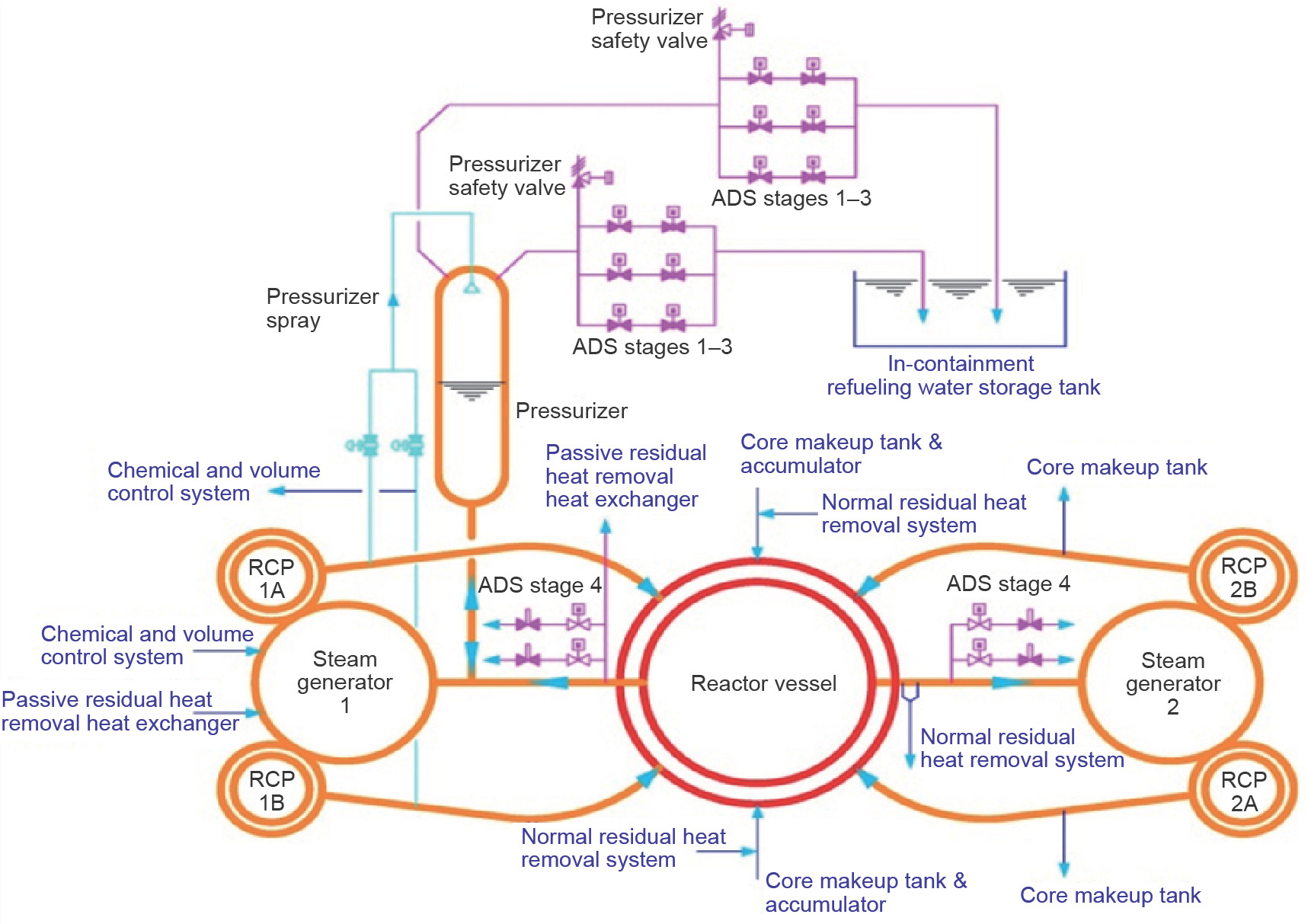
CAP1400 reactor coolant system configuration.

The CAP-1400 is a Pressurized water reactor, in which the primary coolant water is pumped under high pressure to the reactor core where it is heated by the energy released by the fission of atoms. CAP1400 has two primary coolant loops that transfer the heat generated by the fission reaction of 235U in the reactor core to the steam generator, each loop consists of a hot leg, two cold legs, one steam generator, and two canned pumps. CAP1400 has one pressurizer (PRZ) connected to one of the hot legs by a surge line. The fuel core of the reactor has 193 fuel assemblies. The safety systems are fully passive driven, mainly by gravity.

CAP-1400 has a design life of 60 years, and has refueling interval of 18 months, and averaged discharge fuel burnup of ≥50,000 MWd⋅(tU)^{−1}. The system operated pressure is 15.5Mpa, and coolant average temperature is 304 °C, while steam pressure at steam generator is 6.01Mpa. The steam flow at steam generator is around 1123.4 kg⋅s^{−1}.

CAP1400 has a compact and general layout. It covers area of only 0.164 m^{2}·kW^{−1}, which is less than AP1000. Estimated cost of the CAP-1400 is around 16,000 CNY⋅kW^{−1} ($2443 USD⋅kW^{−1} / $3800 USD⋅kW^{−1} PPP).

In February 2019, the Shanghai Nuclear Engineering Research & Design Institute announced that it had begun the conceptual design process for the CAP-1700 based on CAP-1400.

The CAP-1400 project may extend to a larger, three-loop CAP-2100 design if the passive cooling system can be scaled to that level.

== Power Plants ==
Name	Unit No.	Status	Construction start	Grid connection	Commercial operation	Comment
Shidaowan	II-1	Operational	July 19, 2019	2024-11-04	2025	
Shidaowan	II-2	Operational	21 April 2020	2025	2025	
Bailong	3	Planned				
Bailong	4	Planned				
Bailong	5	Planned				
Bailong	6	Planned				
Laiyang	1	Approved for construction				
Laiyang	2	Approved for construction				

== Sources ==
- Zheng, Mingguang; Yan, Jinquan; Jun, Shentu; Tian, Lin; Wang, Xujia; Qiu, Zhongming (2016). "The General Design and Technology Innovations of CAP1400". Engineering. 2 (1). Elsevier BV: 97–102. Bibcode:2016Engin...2...97Z. doi:10.1016/j.eng.2016.01.018. ISSN 2095-8099.
- Shi, Guobao; Gu, Peiwen; Lu, Wei; Wang, Jiayun; Cao, Kemei; Zhang, Kun; Guo, Ning (2019). "CAP1400 IVR related design features and assessment". Nuclear Engineering and Design. 346. Elsevier BV: 35–45. Bibcode:2019NuEnD.346...35S. doi:10.1016/j.nucengdes.2019.03.002. ISSN 0029-5493.
