= Lianjiang Nuclear Power Plant =

Chinese nuclear power plant

- Country: China
- Location: Lianjiang, Guangdong
- Coordinates: 21°33′15″N 109°48′25″E
- Status: Under construction
- Construction began: September 2022
- Construction cost: Unit 1 & 2: $5.6 billion (estimated)
- Owner: State Nuclear Power Technology CORP LTD
- Operator: State Nuclear Zhanjiang Nuclear Power CO LTD

Nuclear power station
- Reactor type: PWR

Power generation
- Units planned: 4 × 1160 MW
- Units under const.: 2 × 1224 MW

The Lianjiang Nuclear Power Plant (Chinese: 廉江核电站) is a nuclear reactor under construction in Cheban town, Lianjiang, Guangdong province of eastern China. It is planned to house six CAP1000 pressurized water reactors (PWRs), at a projected cost of 130 billion yuan (US$18.1 billion). It will be the first Chinese nuclear plant with cooling towers, to reduce the amount of heat released into the local water.

== Construction ==
The construction of the first two reactors at the Lianjiang site was approved by China's State Council in September 2022. Excavation work began in the same month. Construction of the first unit began on 29 September 2023. It is planned to begin operation in 2028.

Construction of the second unit began on 26 April 2024.

On February 27th 2025 the reactor pressure vessel was installed at unit 1.

On July 28 2025, China Nuclear Industry 23 Construction Company was fined for making errors and not following regulations during construction of the Power Plant.

== Reactor data ==
Unit	Type	Net Capacity	Gross Capacity	Construction start	Operation start (planned)	Notes
Phase I
Lianjiang 1	CAP1000	1224 MW	1224 MW	27 September 2023	2028	
Lianjiang 2	CAP1000	1224 MW	1224 MW	29 April 2024		
Phase II
Lianjiang 3	CAP1000	1160 MW				
Lianjiang 4	CAP1000	1160 MW				
Lianjiang 5	CAP1000	1160 MW				
Lianjiang 6	CAP1000	1160 MW				

== See also ==
- Nuclear power in China
