= AP600 =

American nuclear reactor design

The AP600 (Advanced Passive 600) is a model of relatively small, 600 MWe nuclear power plant designed by Westinghouse Electric Company. The AP600 has passive safety features characteristic of the Generation III reactor concept. The projected core damage frequency is nearly 1000 times less than today's Nuclear Regulatory Commission (NRC) requirements, on par with plants currently being considered for construction. The design has been scaled up and improved with the AP1000.

Certification testing and analysis of the AP600 and AP1000 reactor designs for Westinghouse were conducted at the APEX facility at Oregon State University. The one-quarter scale reduced pressure integral system certified the passively safe systems that cool the reactor core using gravity and natural circulation.

The NRC's final design certification was received in 1999 but no orders were ever placed. A large reason Westinghouse entered development of the AP1000 was to improve the economies of scale that come with larger MWe plants. The more powerful AP1000 was designed to have a similar footprint but a taller containment and a power output of 1000 MWe or greater.
