= Taohuajiang Nuclear Power Plant =

Proposed nuclear power plant in Hunan, China

Hunan Taohuajiang Nuclear Power Project
- Country: People's Republic of China
- Location: Taojiang City, Hunan
- Status: Under construction
- Operator: Taojiang Nuclear Power Company

The Hunan Taojiang Nuclear Power Project (simplified Chinese: 桃花江核电厂; traditional Chinese: 桃花江核電廠; pinyin: Táohuā jiāng hédiànzhàn) is located in Taojiang County, Hunan Province, on Heye Mountain in Zhanxi Township on the south bank of Zijiang River. It is 108 kilometers away from Changsha City in the southeast, 59 kilometers away from Changde City in the north, 98 kilometers away from Loudi City in the south, and 37 kilometers away from Yiyang City. It is planned to use four M310 improved pressurized water reactor nuclear power units with a total installed capacity of 4.32 million kilowatts, and construction will start at one time. The total investment of the project is expected to be 67 billion yuan, and the entire project is expected to be completed and put into operation before 2018. At present, the land acquisition, demolition and land leveling of the main site have been completed and the peripheral infrastructure construction has been put in place. The on-site infrastructure construction started on March 1, 2010. China National Nuclear Corporation, China Resources Power Holdings Co., Ltd., China Three Gorges Engineering Development Corporation and Xiangtou Holding Group Co., Ltd. established Hunan Taohuajiang Nuclear Power Co., Ltd. in a ratio of 50:25:20:5. As the owner of the Hunan Taohuajiang Nuclear Power Plant project, it is responsible for the construction and operation of the nuclear power plant.

== Reactor data ==
The Taohuajinag Nuclear Power Plant consists of 4 reactors planned.

== See also ==
- Generation III reactor
