= Generation III reactor =

Class of nuclear reactors with improved safety over its predecessors

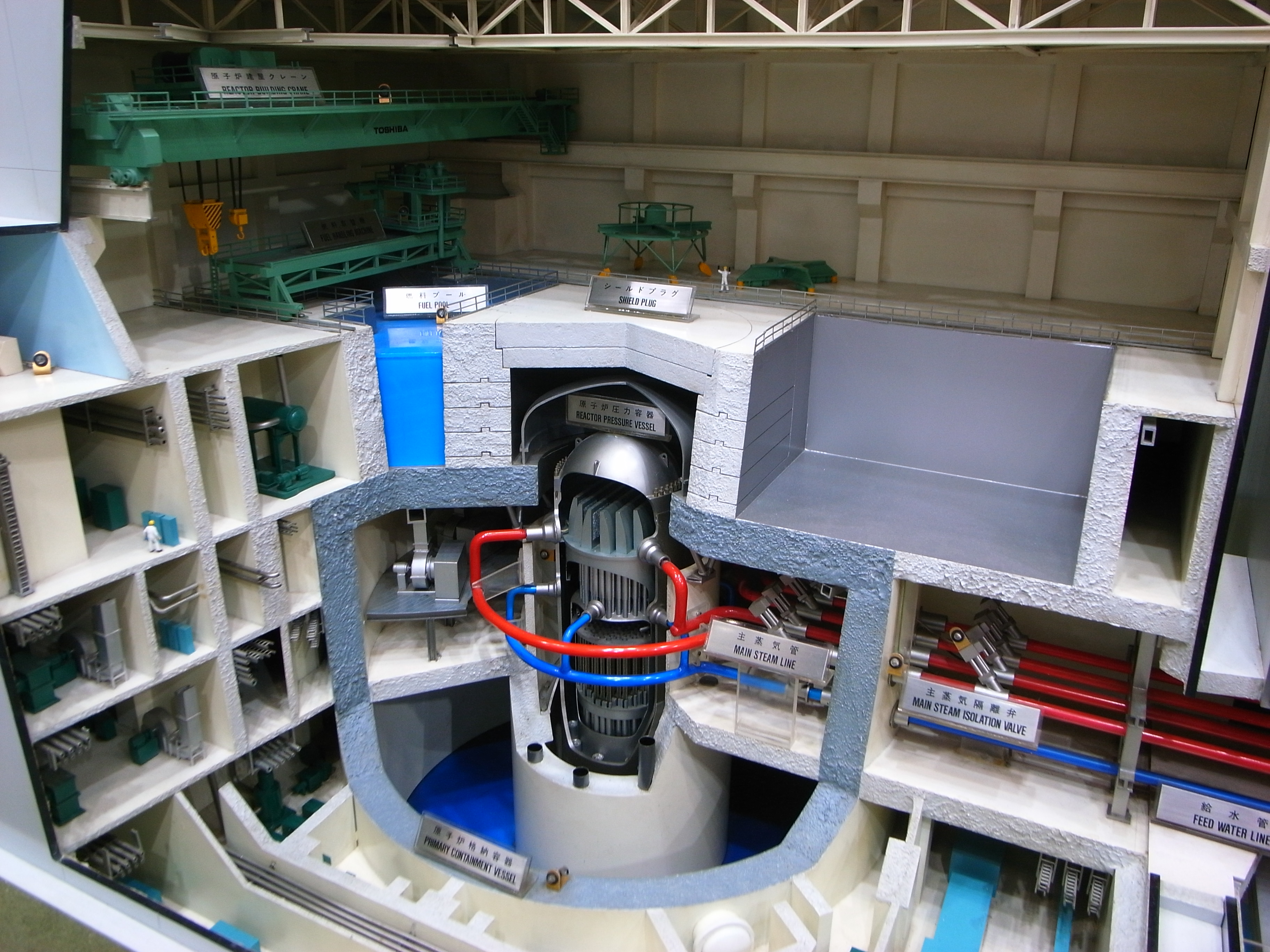
Model of the Toshiba ABWR, which became the first operational Generation III reactor in 1996

Generation III reactors, or Gen III reactors, are a class of nuclear reactors designed to succeed Generation II reactors, incorporating evolutionary improvements in design. These include improved fuel technology, higher thermal efficiency, significantly enhanced safety systems (including passive nuclear safety), and standardized designs intended to reduce maintenance and capital costs. They are promoted by the Generation IV International Forum (GIF).

The first Generation III reactors to begin operation were Kashiwazaki 6 and 7 advanced boiling water reactors (ABWRs) in 1996 and 1997. From 2012, both have been shut down due to a less permissive political environment in the wake of the Fukushima nuclear accident. Due to the prolonged period of stagnation in the construction of new reactors and the continued (albeit declining) popularity of Generation II/II+ designs in new construction, relatively few third generation reactors have been built.

== Overview ==
The older Gen II reactors comprise the vast majority of current nuclear reactors. Gen III reactors are so-called advanced light-water reactors (LWRs). Gen III+ reactors are labeled as "evolutionary designs". Though the distinction between Gen II and III reactors is arbitrary, few Gen III reactors have reached the commercial stage as of 2022. The Generation IV International Forum calls Gen IV reactors "revolutionary designs". These are concepts for which no concrete prognoses for realization existed at the time.

The improvements in reactor technology in third generation reactors are intended to result in a longer operational life (designed for 60 years of operation, extendable to 100+ years of operation prior to complete overhaul and reactor pressure vessel replacement) compared with currently used Generation II reactors (designed for 40 years of operation, extendable to 60+ years of operation prior to complete overhaul and pressure vessel replacement).

The core damage frequencies for these reactors are designed to be lower than for Generation II reactors – 60 core damage events for the European Pressurized Reactor (EPR) and 3 core damage events for the Economic Simplified Boiling Water Reactor (ESBWR) per 100 million reactor-years are significantly lower than the 1,000 core damage events per 100 million reactor-years for BWR/4 Generation II reactors.

The third generation EPR reactor was also designed to use uranium more efficiently than older Generation II reactors, using approximately 17% less per unit of electricity generated than these older reactor technologies. An independent analysis conducted by environmental scientist Barry Brook on the greater efficiency and therefore lower material needs of Gen III reactors, corroborates this finding.

== Developments ==
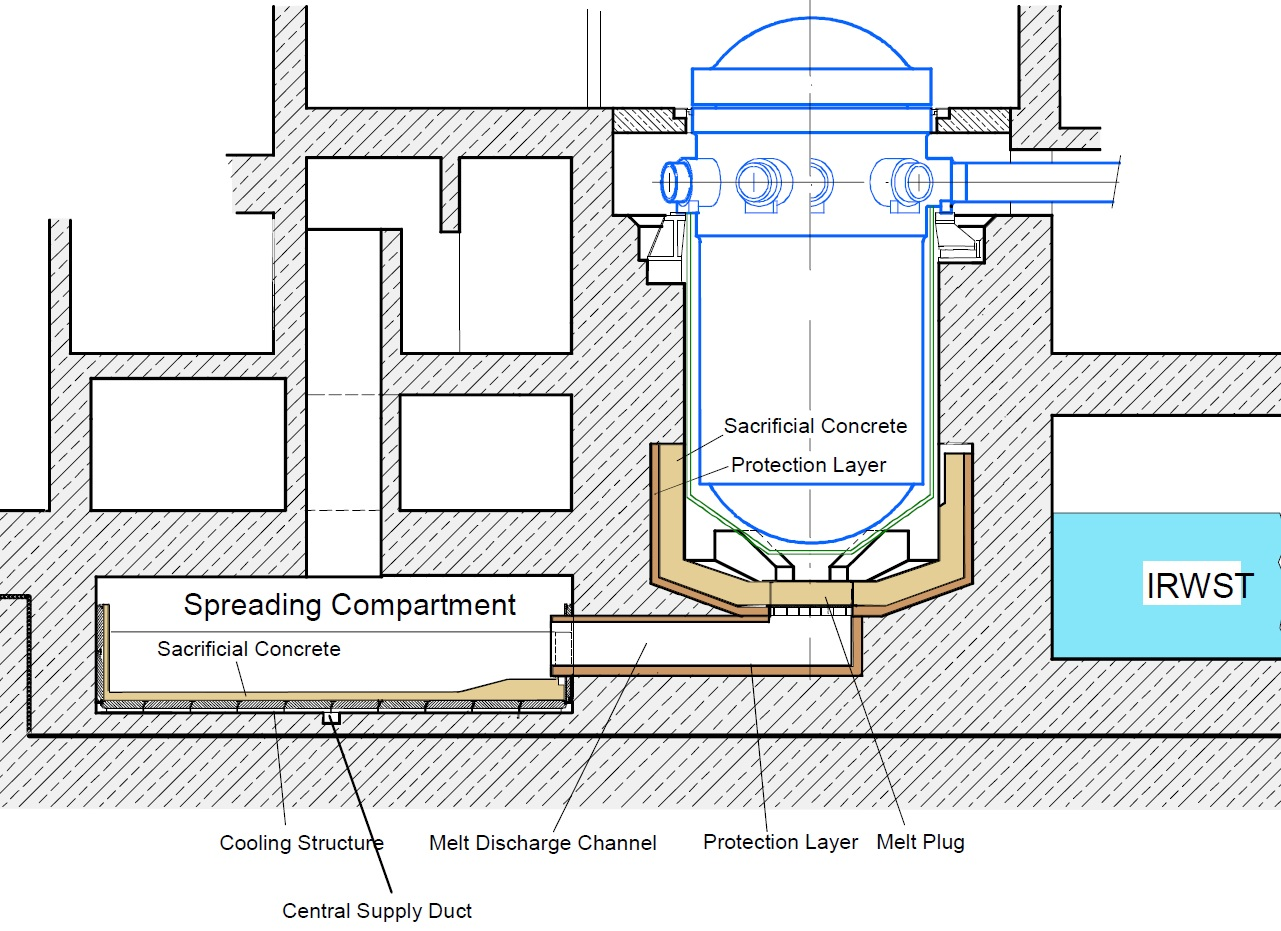
EPR core catching room designed to catch the corium in case of a meltdown. Some Generation III reactors include a core catcher in their design.

Gen III+ reactor designs are an evolutionary development of Gen III reactors, offering improvements in safety over Gen III reactor designs. Manufacturers began development of Gen III+ systems in the 1990s by building on the operating experience of the American, Japanese, and Western European light-water reactor.

The nuclear industry began to promote a nuclear renaissance suggesting that Gen III+ designs should solve three key problems: safety, cost and buildability. Construction costs of US$1,000/kW were forecast, a level that would make nuclear competitive with gas, and construction times of four years or less were expected. However, these estimates proved over-optimistic.

A notable improvement of Gen III+ systems over second-generation designs is the incorporation in some designs of passive safety features that do not require active controls or operator intervention but instead rely on gravity or natural convection to mitigate the impact of abnormal events.

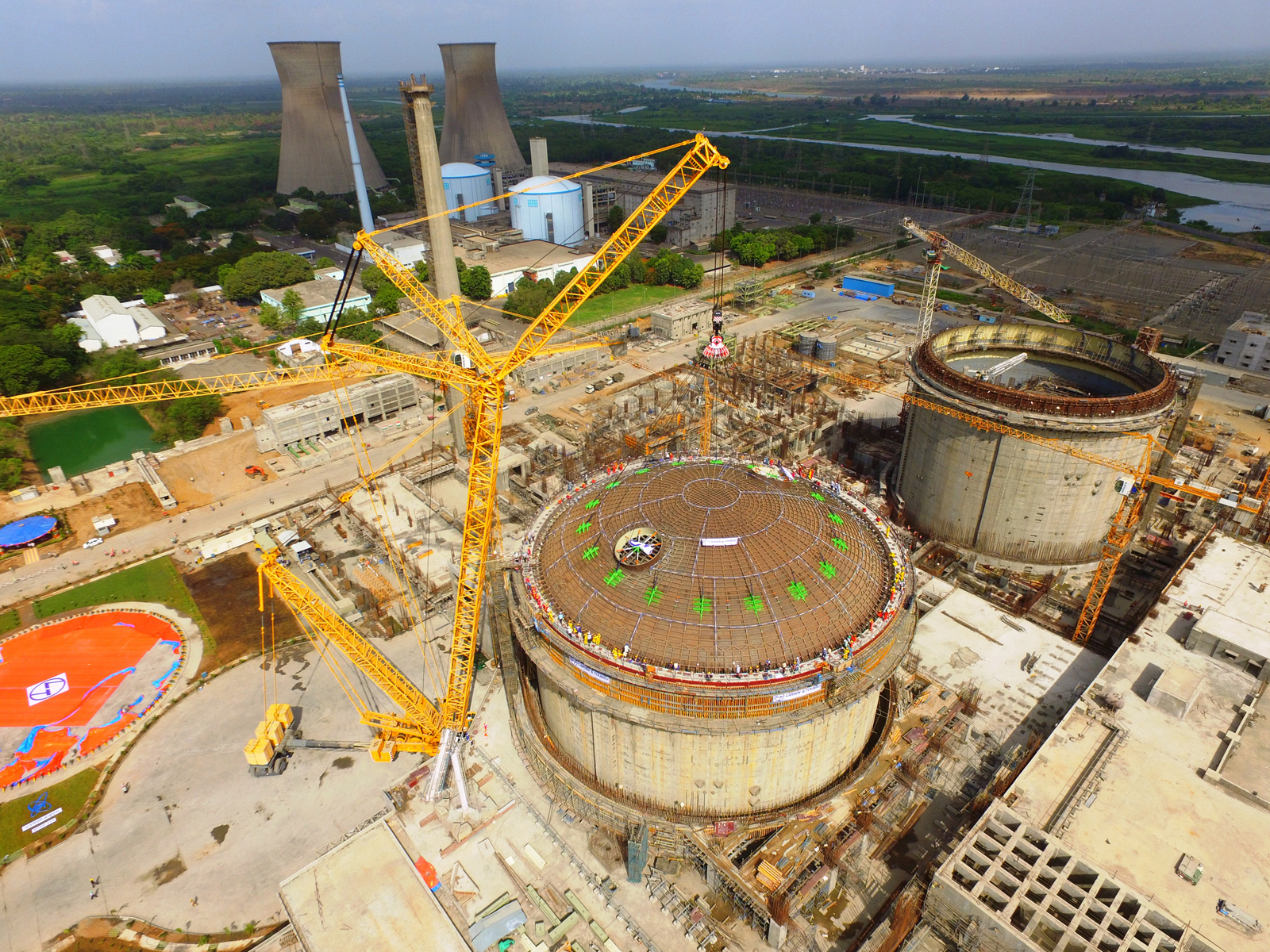
Kakrapar Atomic Power Station Unit 3 and 4 under construction. India's first Generation III+ reactor

Generation III+ reactors incorporate extra safety features to avoid the kind of disaster suffered at Fukushima in 2011. Generation III+ designs, passive safety, also known as passive cooling, requires no sustained operator action or electronic feedback to shut down the plant safely in the event of an emergency. Many of the Generation III+ nuclear reactors have a core catcher. If the fuel cladding and reactor vessel systems and associated piping become molten, corium will fall into a core catcher which holds the molten material and has the ability to cool it. This, in turn protects the final barrier, the containment building. As an example, Rosatom installed a 200-tonne core catcher in the VVER reactor as the first large piece of equipment in the reactor building of Rooppur 1, describing it as "a unique protection system". In 2017, Rosatom has started commercial operations of the NVNPP-2 Unit 1 VVER-1200 reactor in central Russia, marking the world's first full start-up of a generation III+ reactor.

=== First reactors ===
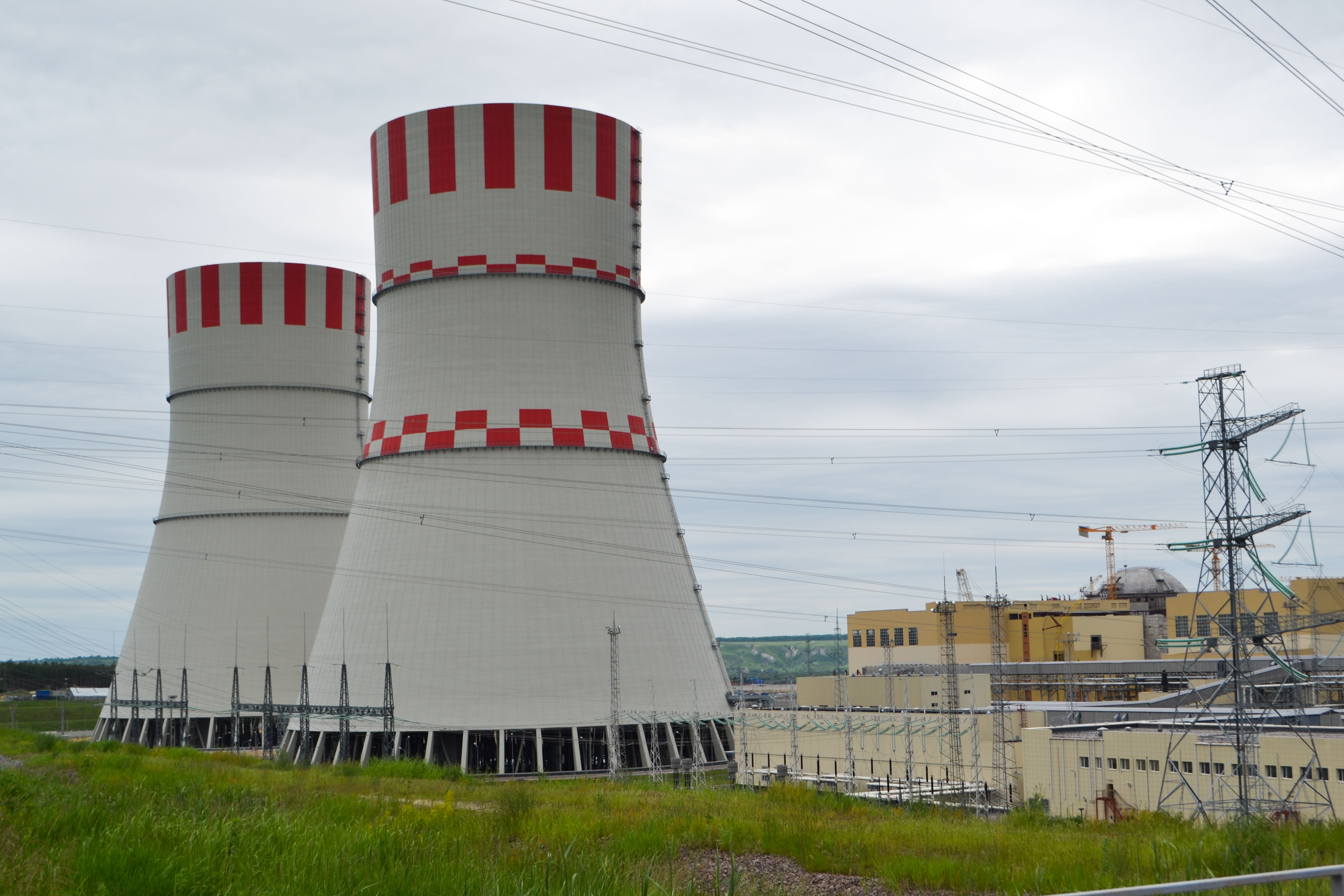
Novovoronezh Nuclear Power Plant II with the first Generation III+ nuclear reactor in the world

The first Generation III reactors were built in Japan, in the form of advanced boiling water reactors. On 5 August 2016, a Generation III+ VVER-1200/392M reactor became operational (first grid connection) at Novovoronezh Nuclear Power Plant II in Russia, which was the first operational Generation III+ reactor.

Several other Generation III+ reactors are under late-stage construction in Europe, China, India, and the United States. The next Generation III+ reactors to come online were an AREVA EPR reactor at the Taishan Nuclear Power Station (first grid connection on 2018-06-29) and a Westinghouse AP1000 reactor at the Sanmen Nuclear Power Station (first grid connection on 2018-06-30) in China.

In the United States, reactor designs are certified by the Nuclear Regulatory Commission (NRC). As of August 2020, the commission has approved seven new designs, and is considering one more design as well as renewal of an expired certification.

== Response and criticism ==
Proponents of nuclear power and some who have historically been critical have acknowledged that third generation reactors as a whole are safer than older reactors.

Edwin Lyman, a senior staff scientist at the Union of Concerned Scientists, has challenged specific cost-saving design choices made for two Generation III reactors, both the AP1000 and ESBWR. Lyman, John Ma (a senior structural engineer at the NRC), and Arnold Gundersen (an anti-nuclear consultant) are concerned about what they perceive as weaknesses in the steel containment vessel and the concrete shield building around the AP1000 in that its containment vessel does not have sufficient safety margins in the event of a direct airplane strike. Other engineers do not agree with these concerns, and claim the containment building is more than sufficient in safety margins and factors of safety.

The Union of Concerned Scientists in 2008 referred to the EPR as the only new reactor design under consideration in the United States that "...appears to have the potential to be significantly safer and more secure against attack than today's reactors."

There have also been issues in fabricating the precision parts necessary to maintain safe operation of these reactors, with cost overruns, broken parts, and extremely fine steel tolerances causing issues with new reactors under construction in France at the Flamanville Nuclear Power Plant.

== Lists of Generation III reactors ==
=== Generation III reactors currently operational or under construction ===
Developer(s)	Reactor name(s)	Type	MW_{e} (net)	MW_{e} (gross)	MW_{th}	Notes
General Electric, Toshiba, Hitachi	ABWR; US-ABWR	BWR	1350	1420	3926	In operation at Kashiwazaki since 1996. NRC certified in 1997.
KEPCO	APR-1400	PWR	1383	1455	3983	In operation at Kori since Jan 2016.
CGNPG	ACPR-1000	PWR	1061	1119	2905	Improved version of the CPR-1000. The first reactor came online in 2018 at Yangjiang-5.
CGNPG, CNNC	Hualong One (HPR-1000)	PWR	1090	1170	3050	In part a merger of the Chinese ACPR-1000 and ACP-1000 designs, but ultimately an incrementally developed improvement on the prior CNP-1000 and CP-1000 designs. It was initially intended to be named the "ACC-1000", but was ultimately named as the "Hualong One" or "HPR-1000". Fangchenggang Units 3–6 will be the first to utilize the HPR-1000 design, with Units 3 & 4 currently under construction as of 2017.
OKBM Afrikantov (Rosatom)	VVER-1000/428	PWR	990	1060	3000	First version of the AES-91 design, designed and used for Tianwan Units 1 & 2, which came online in 2007.
OKBM Afrikantov (Rosatom)	VVER-1000/428M	PWR	1050	1126	3000	Another version of the AES-91 design, also designed and used for Tianwan (this time for Units 3 & 4, which came online in 2017 and 2018, respectively).
OKBM Afrikantov (Rosatom)	VVER-1000/412	PWR	917	1000	3000	First constructed AES-92 design, used for the Kudankulam.

=== Generation III designs not adopted or built yet ===
Developer(s)	Reactor name(s)	Type	MW_{e} (net)	MW_{e} (gross)	MW_{th}	Notes
General Electric, Hitachi	ABWR-II	BWR	1638	1717	4960	Improved version of the ABWR. Uncertain development status.
Mitsubishi	APWR; US-APWR; EU-APWR; APWR+	PWR	1600	1700	4451	Two units planned at Tsuruga cancelled in 2011. US NRC licensing for two units planned at Comanche Peak was suspended in 2013. The original APWR and the updated US-APWR/EU-APWR (also known as the APWR+) differ significantly in their design characteristics, with the APWR+ having higher efficiency and electrical output.
Westinghouse	AP600	PWR	600	619	1940	NRC certified in 1999. Evolved into the larger AP1000 design.
Combustion Engineering	System 80+	PWR	1350	1400	3914	NRC certified in 1997. Provided a basis for the Korean APR-1400.
OKBM Afrikantov (Rosatom)	VVER-1000/466(B)	PWR	1011	1060	3000	This was the first AES-92 design to be developed, originally intended to be built at the proposed Belene Nuclear Power Plant, but construction was later halted.
Candu Energy Inc.	EC6	PHWR	?	750	2084	The EC6 (Enhanced CANDU 6) is an evolutionary upgrade of previous CANDU designs. Like other CANDU designs, it is capable of using unenriched natural uranium as fuel.
Candu Energy Inc.	AFCR	PHWR	?	740	2084	The Advanced Fuel CANDU Reactor is a modified EC6 design that has been optimized for extreme fuel flexibility with the ability to handle numerous potential reprocessed fuel blends and even thorium. It is currently undergoing late-stage development as part of a joint venture between SNC-Lavalin, CNNC, and Shanghai Electric.
NIKIET (Rosatom)	MKER	BWR	1000	?	2085	A Development of the RBMK nuclear power reactor. Fixes all of the RBMK reactor's design errors and flaws and adds a full containment building and Passive nuclear safety features such as a passive core cooling system. The physical prototype of the MKER-1000 is the 5th unit of the Kursk Nuclear Power Plant. The construction of Kursk 5 was cancelled in 2012 and a VVER-TOI whose construction is ongoing since 2018 is being built instead as of 2018.(see RBMK article)

== Lists of Generation III+ reactors ==
=== Generation III+ reactors currently operational or under construction ===
Developer(s)	Reactor name(s)	Type	MW_{e} (net)	MW_{e} (gross)	MW_{th}	First grid connection	Notes
Westinghouse, Toshiba	AP1000	PWR	1117	1250	3400	2018-06-30 Sanmen	NRC certified Dec 2005.
SNPTC	CAP1400	PWR	1500		4040	2024-11-04; Shidaowan	The first Chinese co-developed and upsized "native" version/derivative of the AP1000. Westinghouse's co-development agreement gives China the IP rights for all co-developed plants >1350 MWe.The CAP1400 is planned to be followed by a CAP1700 and/or a CAP2100 design if the cooling systems can be scaled up by far enough.
Areva	EPR	PWR	1660	1750	4590	2018-06-29 Taishan	
OKB Gidropress (Rosatom)	VVER-1200/392M	PWR	1114	1180	3200	2016-08-05 Novovoronezh II	The VVER-1200 series is also known as the AES-2006/MIR-1200 design. This particular model was the original reference model used for the VVER-TOI project.
OKB Gidropress (Rosatom)	VVER-1200/491	PWR	1085	1199	3200	2018-03-09 Leningrad II	
OKB Gidropress (Rosatom)	VVER-1200/509	PWR	1114	1200	3200		Under construction in Akkuyu NPP, as Akkuyu 1–4. Based on AES-2006 with updated seismic and regulatory conditions from VVER-TOI. Grid connections due between 2025 and 2028.
OKB Gidropress (Rosatom)	VVER-1200/523	PWR	1080	1200	3200		2.4 GWe Rooppur Nuclear Power Plant of Bangladesh is under construction. The two units of VVER-1200/523 generating 2.4 GWe are planned to be operational in 2024 and 2025.
OKB Gidropress (Rosatom)	VVER-1200/513	PWR	1200		3200		Standardized version of the VVER-1200 based in part on the VVER-1300/510 design (which is the current reference design for the VVER-TOI project).
OKB Gidropress (Rosatom)	VVER-1300/510	PWR	1115	1255	3300		The VVER-1300 design is also known as the AES-2010 design, and is sometimes mistakenly designated as the VVER-TOI design. The VVER-1300/510 is based on the VVER-1200/392M that was originally used as the reference design for the VVER-TOI project, although the VVER-1300/510 now serves that role (which has led to confusion between the VVER-TOI plant design and the VVER-1300/510 reactor design). Multiple units are currently planned for construction at several Russian nuclear plants. First units under construction at Kursk Nuclear Power Plant.
BARC	IPHWR-700	PHWR	630	700	2166	2021-1-10 Kakrapar	Successor of indigenous 540MWe PHWR with increased output and additional safety features. Under construction and due to come online in 2020. Unit 3 at Kakrapar Atomic Power Station achieved first criticality on 22 July 2020. The Unit 3 was connected to the grid on 10 January 2021.

=== Generation III+ designs not adopted or built yet ===
Developer(s)	Reactor name(s)	Type	MW_{e} (net)	MW_{e} (gross)	MW_{th}	Notes
Toshiba	EU-ABWR	BWR	?	1600	4300	Updated version of the ABWR designed to meet EU guidelines, increase reactor output, and improve design generation to III+.
Areva	Kerena	BWR	1250	1290	3370	Previously known as the [Siemens, KWU] SWR-1000 (Siedewasserreaktor 1000MW). Based on German BWR designs, mainly that of Gundremmingen units B/C. Co-developed by Areva and E.ON.
General Electric, Hitachi	ESBWR	BWR	1520	1600	4500	Based on the unreleased SBWR design which in turn was based on the ABWR. Being considered for North Anna 3. Eschews the use of recirculation pumps entirely in favor of a design completely reliant on natural circulation (which is very unusual for a boiling water reactor design).
KEPCO	APR+	PWR	1505	1560	4290	APR-1400 successor with increased output and additional safety features.
KEPCO	APR-1000	PWR	1000	1050	2850	Downsized version of APR-1400, cooling system similar to OPR-1000 design. # of fuel assemblies reduced from 241 to 177, additional safety features.
Areva, Mitsubishi	ATMEA1	PWR	1150	?	3150	Proposed Sinop plant did not proceed
OKB Gidropress (Rosatom)	VVER-600/498	PWR	600	1600	Essentially a scaled-down VVER-1200. Commercial deployment planned by 2030 at Kola.	
BARC	IPWR-900	PWR	900	?	2700	India's first light water reactor, a Gen 3+ design based on the CLWR-B1 reactor of Arihant-class submarine.
Candu Energy Inc.	ACR-1000	PHWR	1085	1165	3200	The Advanced CANDU Reactor is a hybrid CANDU design that retains the heavy water moderator but replaces the heavy water coolant with conventional light water coolant, significantly reducing heavy water costs compared to traditional CANDU designs but losing the characteristic CANDU capability of using unenriched natural uranium as fuel.
Mitsubishi Heavy Industries	SRZ-1200	PWR	?	1210	3411	New Generation 3+ Reactor design from Mitsubishi

== See also ==
- Generation II reactor
- Generation IV reactor
- List of reactor types
