= Sanmen Nuclear Power Station =

Nuclear plant in Zhejiang, China

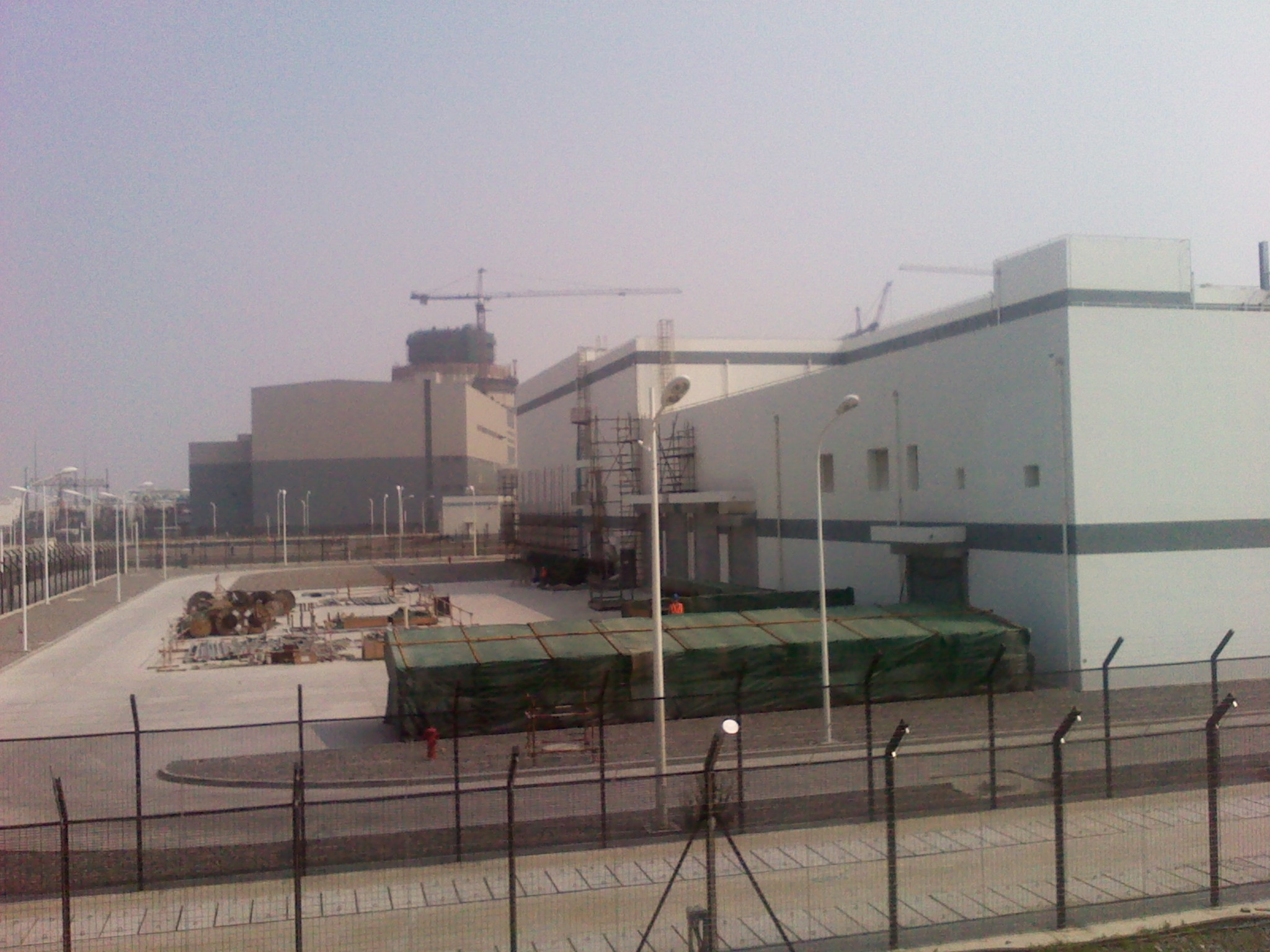
- Country: China
- Location: Sanmen County, Taizhou, Zhejiang
- Coordinates: 29°6′4″N 121°38′31″E
- Status: Operational
- Construction began: Unit 1: 19 April 2009; Unit 2: 15 December 2009
- Commission date: Unit 1: 21 September 2018; Unit 2: 5 November 2018
- Construction cost: 50 billion yuan (7.3 billion USD) for the whole two AP1000 reactor plant
- Owner: China National Nuclear Corporation (CNNC)
- Operators: Sanmen Nuclear Power (subsidiary of CNNC)

Nuclear power station
- Reactor type: PWR
- Reactor supplier: Westinghouse
- Cooling source: Shefan Channel
- Thermal capacity: 2 × 3400 MW_{th} (operational)

Power generation
- Units operational: 2 × 1157 MW
- Make and model: Westinghouse AP1000
- Units under const.: 2 × 1100 MW
- Nameplate capacity: 2314 MW

External links
- Website: www.smnpc.com.cn/%20www.smnpc.com.cn
- Commons: Related media on Commons

The Sanmen Nuclear Power Station (Chinese: 三门核电站) is a nuclear power station in Sanmen County, Zhejiang, China. Sanmen is the first implementation of the AP1000 pressurized water reactor (PWR) developed by Westinghouse Electric Company.

== History ==
The contract for the plant was agreed in July 2007. Announcement of the project start came roughly twelve months after Westinghouse won a bidding contest over other companies. The contract for the new plant involved The Shaw Group (now part of Westinghouse), a minority shareholder in Westinghouse. Westinghouse was controlled by Japanese Toshiba. The Shaw Group did provide engineering, procurement, commissioning, information management and project management services.

The first pair of reactors were estimated to cost CNY 32.4 billion yuan, later estimates in 2013 gave figures of CNY 40.1 billion (US$6.12 billion). The final sum was CNY 10 billion higher.

Groundbreaking for the first and second units was held 26 February 2008. Excavation for the first unit was completed in September 2008. Quality of the pit was certified, putting the project 67 days ahead of schedule. Construction of Sanmen Unit 1 began on 19 April 2009, as the first 5,200 m^{3} of concrete were poured for the foundation, in a ceremony attended by State Nuclear Power Technology Corporation (SNPTC) chair Wang Binghua and Westinghouse CEO Aris Candris. First concrete for Sanmen 2 was poured on 15 December 2009.

In June 2014, China First Heavy Industries completed the first domestically produced AP1000 reactor pressure vessel for the second AP1000 unit.

The units were originally projected to begin operation in 2014 and 2015. In April 2015, a start date of 2016 was projected for both. One month later, the start date was put back to 2017. In January 2017 China National Nuclear Corporation (CNNC) announced that the final reactor coolant pump had been installed with start of operations still foreseen for 2017. As of March 2018, Sanmen 1 had completed pre-fuelling safety checks but was not expected to be connected to the grid until the fall of 2018 at the earliest. Hot testing of Sanmen 1 was completed in June 2017, and fuel loading started on 25 April 2018. It subsequently became the first AP1000 reactor in the world to achieve first criticality at 2:09 AM on 21 June 2018, and was connected to the grid on 30 June 2018. Sanmen Unit 1 entered into commercial operation on 21 September 2018.

Sanmen Unit 2 achieved first criticality on 17 August 2018 and was connected to the grid on 24 August 2018. Full-power demonstration testing was completed on 5 November 2018, and the unit is now considered to be in commercial operation.

In March 2019 Sanmen Unit 2 shut down because of a reactor coolant pump defect, with the root cause still under investigation. A replacement pump has been shipped from the United States by Curtiss-Wright. There have been previous problems with these pumps with impeller blade quality, which involved the return of three pumps to the U.S. in 2013.

== Reactor data ==
The Sanmen Nuclear Power Plant consist of 2 operational reactors.

Unit	Type / Model	Net capacity	Gross capacity	Thermal capacity	Construction start	First criticality	Grid connection	Commercial operation	Notes
Phase I
Sanmen 1	PWR / AP1000	1157 MW	1251 MW	3400 MW	19 April 2009	2018-06-21	30 June 2018	2018-09-21	
Sanmen 2	PWR / AP1000	1157 MW	1251 MW	3400 MW	15 December 2009	2018-08-17	24 August 2018	2018-11-05	
Phase II
Sanmen 3	PWR / CAP1000	1163 MW	1251 MW	3400 MW	28 June 2022				
Sanmen 4	PWR / CAP1000	1163 MW	1251 MW	3400 MW	22 March 2023				
Phase III
Sanmen 5	PWR / Hualong One	1000 MW	1215 MW	3400 MW					
Sanmen 6	PWR / Hualong One	1000 MW	1215 MW	3400 MW					

Groundwork for units 3 and 4 have been carried out, but during the process, the project nearly came to a standstill. This comes due to delays with CAP-1000 projects. However, on 20 April 2022, permission to resume construction on the two units was approved by the State Council.

== See also ==
- Nuclear power in China
- Nuclear power debate
- List of commercial nuclear reactors § China
