= First concrete pour =

Initial major concrete-pouring operation in a construction project

A first concrete pour is the initial major concrete-pouring operation in a construction project. In a broader sense, it signifies the point at which a project enters a more definitive construction phase and leaves the planning or preparatory stages.

== Background ==
Large-scale building and construction projects can have long planning phases. Preparation works at the site, construction of access roads, and development of other infrastructure may begin even before definitive decisions regarding financing and construction have been reached.

Major concrete pouring operations are costly and irreversible, and are typically initiated only when there is a reasonable degree of certainty that the project will proceed. Such an event is often marked as a project milestone or deliverable and a clear signal that the project will indeed be brought to completion.

The concept is used, for instance, in the nuclear power industry, where the timeline from site selection, planning and site preparation through to construction and final completion can be substantial. However, the term is also applied to construction projects in more general contexts.
