= Westinghouse Electric Company =

American nuclear power company

Westinghouse Electric Company LLC
- Type: Joint venture
- Industry: Nuclear power; Nuclear fuel; Radioactive handling; Inspection; Welding
- Predecessor: Westinghouse Electric Corporation
- Founded: 1999; 27 years ago, in Monroeville, Pennsylvania
- Headquarters: Cranberry Township, Pennsylvania, United States
- Area served: Worldwide
- Key people: George Westinghouse (corporate namesake; founder of the original Westinghouse (1886))
- Owner: Brookfield Renewable Partners (51%) (2023–present); Cameco (49%) (2023–present)
- Number of employees: >11,000
- Subsidiaries: Astare; CS Innovations; Fauske & Associates; Mangiarotti SpA; NA Engineering Associates Inc.; Westinghouse Electric South Africa; PaR Nuclear; WEC Welding and Machining; WesDyne International; Westron
- Website: westinghousenuclear.com

Westinghouse Electric Company LLC is an American nuclear power company formed in 1999 from the nuclear power division of the original Westinghouse Electric Corporation. It offers nuclear products and services to utilities internationally, including nuclear fuel, service and maintenance, instrumentation, control and design of nuclear power plants. Westinghouse's world headquarters are located in the Pittsburgh suburb of Cranberry Township, Pennsylvania.

The company's main product is the AP1000, a modern pressurized water reactor (PWR) design with many passive safety features and modular construction intended to lower construction time and cost. Twelve AP1000 reactors are currently in operation with a further nineteen in various stages of planning.

The company was initially formed as CBS Corporation spun off the remaining pieces of Westinghouse's industrial concerns, as part of Westinghouse's re-creation as a media company. Portions of their nuclear business were initially purchased by Siemens in 1998 before the remaining parts were purchased by British Nuclear Fuels Limited (BNFL) in 1999 and formed up as Westinghouse Electric. In 2005, BNFL sold the company to Toshiba.

The company went bankrupt in 2017 primarily due to ongoing cost overruns at the Vogtle Electric Generating Plant and Virgil C. Summer Nuclear Generating Station expansions, the first US builds of the company's AP1000 design. It emerged from bankruptcy after being purchased by Brookfield Business Partners, a Canadian private equity fund. They sold it to a consortium of Brookfield Renewable Partners and Cameco, a Canadian nuclear fuel and services company. Renewable Partners is the current majority owner of the Westinghouse Electric Company.

== History ==
Westinghouse Electric Company was formed in 1999, after the original company with that name, George Westinghouse's Westinghouse Electric, founded in 1886, ceased to exist due to a series of divestitures and mergers through the mid-to-late 1990s. These included Westinghouse Electric's purchase of CBS in 1995, expansion into communications and broadcasting, and the selling off of most non-broadcast operations by 1998, renaming itself CBS Corporation.

In 1998, the Westinghouse Power Generation Business unit was sold to Siemens of Germany. In 1999, CBS Corporation sold its nuclear business (Westinghouse Electric Company) to British Nuclear Fuels Limited (BNFL) and a year later CBS Corporation was merged into Viacom (1971–2005), putting an end to the original Westinghouse. Legally, Westinghouse Electric Corporation still exists, mainly for the purpose of licensing, as a subsidiary of CBS Corporation.

=== Association with Paramount Skydance ===
Although no longer associated with CBS Corporation (later Paramount Global and now Paramount Skydance), Westinghouse Electric Company LLC has for some years used the trademarks owned by Westinghouse Electric Corporation, by then Viacom/CBS Corporation/ViacomCBS' brand management subsidiary, under license, as is the case with other Westinghouse licensees. In 2021, ViacomCBS sold the Westinghouse licensing operation (including trademarks) directly to the now-independent Westinghouse Electric Corporation.

=== Sale to Toshiba ===
In July 2005, BNFL confirmed it planned to sell Westinghouse, then estimated to be worth $2 billion. This attracted interest from several companies, including Toshiba, General Electric and Mitsubishi Heavy Industries. When the Financial Times reported on January 23, 2006, that Toshiba had won the bid, it valued the company's offer at $5bn (£2.8bn). On February 6, 2006, Toshiba confirmed it was buying Westinghouse Electric Company for $5.4bn and announced it would sell a minority stake to investors.

The sale surprised many industry experts who questioned the wisdom of BNFL selling one of the world's largest producers of nuclear reactors shortly before the market for nuclear power was expected to grow substantially; China, the United States and the United Kingdom were all expected to invest heavily in nuclear power. After the 2005 Indo-US nuclear deal, there was also hope that India's plan of massive investment in nuclear plants would help to revive the U.S. nuclear power industry.

Reasons in favor of a sale were: The commercial risk of the company's business in Asia may have been too high for a company then owned by taxpayers; if Westinghouse won the bid for any new nuclear stations in a UK competition, questions may be raised of favoritism, but if it lost, it might have been seen as a lack of faith in its own technology. Finally, the record of UK governments building nuclear plants had been a commercial disaster.

On October 16, 2006, the acquisition of Westinghouse Electric Company for $5.4 billion was completed, with Toshiba obtaining a 77% share, partners The Shaw Group a 20% share and Ishikawajima-Harima Heavy Industries Co. Ltd. a 3% share. On 13 August 2007 Toshiba sold 10% to Kazatomprom, the national uranium company for the Republic of Kazakhstan, for US$540 million, leaving Toshiba with 67%. Kazatomprom's ownership was entirely passive, with no voting or veto rights or presence on the board of directors.

In September, 2011, Toshiba was reported to be in talks to acquire the Shaw stake and both companies confirmed the story soon thereafter. Shaw CEO James Bernhard said, that Toshiba was paying US$1.6 Bn for the Shaw-owned 20% stake, and that it was the 50% rise in the yen on its yen-denominated debt over five years, which had led it to exercise its sale option. Toshiba said in late 2012 it was open to, and considering, having other partners invest in the business. The purchase closed in January 2013, and brought Toshiba's share in the company to 87% as a result of Shaw exercising its option.

=== Move to Cranberry Township, Pennsylvania ===
After several years of doing business there, Westinghouse decided to move its world headquarters from the Energy Center in Monroeville, Pennsylvania, to Cranberry Woods in Cranberry Township, Butler County, Pennsylvania, as reported in a 2007 memo to its employees that stated the main reason was the rapid expansion of the global nuclear industry. Construction began in July 2007 and the move lasted from June 2009 to December 2010.

The Repair, Replacement and Automation Services (RRAS) business segment moved to Cranberry Township earlier than other business segments to help alleviate space issues at the headquarters in Monroeville and was completed in spring of 2008. As part of this move, Westinghouse piloted the first commuter shuttle running an all-day loop between Monroeville and Cranberry Township. The shuttle ceased operation after Westinghouse formally closed, and sold their Monroeville facility in 2012.

=== 2015 accounting difficulties ===
In 2015, concerns were expressed that the value of assets and goodwill in Westinghouse were overstated. Following an accounting scandal in which profits were overstated at Toshiba, leading to the CEO resigning, Toshiba stated that the Westinghouse nuclear business was more profitable than at acquisition in 2006.

In December 2016, Toshiba said it expected to write down its investment in Westinghouse by US$2.5 billion, adding that it was possible that their investment in Westinghouse could ultimately have a negative worth, due to cost overruns at U.S. nuclear reactors it was building.

In February 2017, Toshiba revealed unaudited details of a 390 billion yen ($3.4 billion) loss, mainly in its US nuclear business which was written down by 712 billion yen ($6.3 billion). On 14 February 2017, Toshiba delayed filing financial results, and Toshiba chairman Shigenori Shiga, formerly chairman of Westinghouse, resigned. Toshiba considered selling the Westinghouse nuclear business.

=== 2017 Chapter 11 bankruptcy ===
On 29 March 2017, Toshiba's Westinghouse filed for Chapter 11 bankruptcy, citing a yearly loss for Toshiba that could exceed $9 billion, almost three times its previous estimate.

The projects responsible for this loss were mostly the construction of four AP1000 reactors at Vogtle in Georgia and Virgil C. Summer Nuclear Generating Station in South Carolina. The Wall Street Journal reported that the four nuclear reactors being built in the southeastern U.S. would be left to an unknown fate.

In July, 2017, the co-owners of the V.C. Summer plant announced that the project was terminated. On September 24, 2017, the Post & Courier reported that Westinghouse had hired unlicensed workers to create mechanical and electrical blueprints for the V.C. Summer expansion without having a professional engineer sign off on them which was in violation of state law. The blueprints were often faulty and led to significant delays. The U.S. government had given $8.3 billion of loan guarantees on the financing of the four nuclear reactors being built in the U.S.

Besides the issues with the AP1000 design, the fuel manufacturing division has been profitable, but not enough to cover corporate overheads and support the other divisions. Research and development investment in fuel manufacturing has been low, which has impacted the quality and comparative performance of its fuel compared to competitors.

=== 2018 sale to Brookfield Business Partners ===
On 6 April 2018, Toshiba announced the completion of the sale of Westinghouse's holding company to Brookfield Business Partners (a subsidiary of Canadian investment management company Brookfield Asset Management Inc.) and some partners for $4.6bn.

=== Sale to Brookfield Renewable Partners and Cameco ===
In October 2022, Brookfield Renewable Partners (another subsidiary of Brookfield Asset Management) and Cameco announced the acquisition of Westinghouse Electric from Brookfield Business Partners in a US$7.9 billion deal including debt. Brookfield Renewable and its institutional partners will own a 51% interest in Westinghouse, while Cameco will own remaining 49% as part of the deal.

The acquisition was completed in November 2023.

In October 2025, Westinghouse announced an agreement with the Trump Administration to begin plans for $80 billion in new nuclear reactors throughout the United States, including AP1000 and AP300 models.

On July 31, 2026, Westinghouse announced that it had confidentially submitted a draft registration statement on Form S-1 to the U.S. Securities and Exchange Commission (SEC) for a proposed initial public offering of its common stock. Cameco, a co-owner of Westinghouse, separately confirmed the submission in a press release furnished to the SEC as an exhibit to a Form 6-K filing. Reuters reported that the filing came amid increased investor interest in nuclear-energy companies, as the expansion of data centers by large technology companies contributed to rising U.S. electricity demand.

=== Timeline ===
- 1999: Westinghouse Electric Company officially began operations as British Nuclear Fuels Limited's nuclear power business.
- 2000: BNFL bought ABB's nuclear power business, and merged into Westinghouse.
- 2004: Westinghouse bids for two Chinese reactor sites; the US Export-Import bank approved $5 billion in loan guarantees
- 2006: Westinghouse acquired PaR Nuclear/Ederer Nuclear Cranes, providing fuel and cask handling equipment systems. Westinghouse Electric Company was sold by BNFL to Toshiba,
- 2007: Westinghouse won China National Nuclear Corporation's bid for 4 AP1000 reactors including Technology Transfer agreement; acquired IST Nuclear of IST Holdings (South Africa); Carolina Energy Solutions (CES) and its affiliates Aggressive Equipment (AE), now WEC Machining; Construction Institute of America (CIA), now WEC Welding Institute; and Carolina United Services, now Carolina Union Services; Astare, a French nuclear engineering company headquartered near Paris.
- 2009: Westinghouse acquired Nuclear Fuel Industries, Japan's sole producer of nuclear fuel for boiling-water reactor and pressurized water reactors for $100 million and CS Innovations, LLC, an Instrumentation and Control (I&C) nuclear product supplier to the digital I&C safety system upgrade market.
- 2010: Westinghouse announced involvement in a new, ultra-large forging press in the UK to be built at Sheffield Forgemasters in Yorkshire; took a major stake in Springfields Fuel Limited in the UK. Westinghouse moved world headquarters from Monroeville, Pennsylvania, to Cranberry Township, Pennsylvania.
- 2012: Westinghouse cut 200 jobs citing the Fukushima disaster, Germany's Energiewende and low natural gas prices.
- 2014: Westinghouse acquires Mangiarotti.
- 2015 Westinghouse acquires CB&I Stone & Webster; Toshiba profits overstated leading to accounting scandal.
- 2017: Westinghouse files Chapter 11 bankruptcy.
- 2018: Acquisition by Brookfield Business Partners and partners.
- 2019: Westinghouse acquires Canadian NA Engineering Associates.
- 2020: Westinghouse acquires U.K. Inspection Consultants Limited (InCon) and Rolls-Royce's nuclear services division.
- 2021: Westinghouse acquires Canadian firm Laveer Engineering; Westinghouse acquires 50% of Tecnatom.
- 2022: Westinghouse acquires BHI Energy
- 2023: Acquisition by Brookfield Renewable Partners and Cameco. Westinghouse completes the 100% acquisition of Tecnatom.

=== CEOs ===
- Charles W. Pryor Jr., 1997 - July 1, 2002.
- Steve Tritch, July 1, 2002 - July 1, 2008
- Aris Candris, July 1, 2008 - March 31, 2012
- Jim Ferland, April 1, 2012 - April 3, 2012 (2 days)
- Shigenori Shiga, April 3, 2012 - September 2012 (interim)
- Danny Roderick, September 2012 - June 2016
- José Emeterio Gutiérrez, June 2016 - July 31, 2019
- Patrick Fragman, August 19, 2019 – March 31, 2025
- Dan Sumner, April 1, 2025 – present (interim)

== Reactors ==
=== AP600, AP1000, and Chinese AP1000 ===
A revived interest in the nuclear power generation field in the late 1980s led to Westinghouse's development of the AP600 reactor which received NRC approval. Interest in the Westinghouse design, but with larger power output led to the change of the project to the AP1000 in 1999 and shortly after became the first Generation III+ reactor to receive final design approval from the NRC in 2004. As of 2014, four of these units are under construction in China, though the first was due to come on-line in November 2013. and has been delayed until December 2014.

The delay due to the constantly changing, and consequently untested, design prompted Li Yulun, former vice-president of China National Nuclear Corporation, in 2013 to raise concerns over the safety standards of the plant. Citing a lack of operating history, he questioned the manufacturer's assertion that the AP1000 reactor's "primary system canned motor pumps" were "maintenance-free" over 60 years, the assumed life of the reactor, and noted that Westinghouse had yet to receive approval from British authorities on an improved version of AP1000. As of 2019 all four AP1000 reactors in China are operating.

As of January 2009, six AP1000 plants had been ordered in the US, and several other customers had chosen the AP1000, if they were to build new nuclear plants, for a combined total of at least 14 new plants, announced by the NuStart Consortium, Duke Power, Progress Energy, Southern Nuclear and SCE&G. In May 2011 after the Fukushima Daiichi nuclear disaster, US government regulators found problems with the design of the shield building of the new reactors. Gregory Jaczko, chairman of the Nuclear Regulatory Commission since 2005 said that computations submitted by Westinghouse about the building's design appeared to be wrong and "had led to more questions." He said the company had not used a range of possible temperatures for calculating potential seismic stresses on the shield building in the event of an earthquake, for example. The NRC asked Westinghouse not only to fix its calculations, but also to explain why it submitted flawed information in the first place. Westinghouse countered that the "confirmatory items" that the commission was asking for were not "safety significant."

In November 2011, the AP1000 Oversight Group published a report highlighting six areas of major concern and un-reviewed safety questions requiring immediate technical review by the NRC. The report concluded that certification of the AP1000 should be delayed until the original and current "unanswered safety questions" raised by the AP1000 Oversight Group are resolved.

In December 2011, the UK's Office for Nuclear Regulation published a design assessment report on the AP1000 reactor which highlighted 51 'Generic Design Assessment' issues remaining that must be addressed before the assessment would be completed.

In October 2013, US energy secretary Ernest Moniz announced that China was to supply components to the US nuclear power plants under construction as part of a bilateral co-operation agreement between the two countries. Since China's State Nuclear Power Technology Co (SNPTC) acquired Westinghouses's AP1000 technology in 2006, it has developed a manufacturing supply chain capable of supplying international power projects. Industry analysts have pointed out that there are gaps in the Chinese supply chain.

=== AP300 small modular reactor (SMR) ===
In May 2023, Westinghouse announced AP300 small modular reactor (SMR). The reactor was based on design of AP1000 engineering design.

=== eVinci microreactor ===
In 2024 Westinghouse received US federal funding for front-end engineering and experiment design (FEEED) of its eVinci nuclear microreactor. In 2025 its Preliminary Safety Design Report (PSDR) was approved by DOE, the first microreactor to do so. Testing was expected to begin in 2026. EVinci is a TRISO-fuelled, heat pipe-cooled 5 MWe microreactor. The reactor core is designed for eight or more full-power years before refuelling. It is factory-built and can be shipped in a container. The eVinci test reactor is a 3 MWt version designed to demonstrate key portions of the eVinci design. Testing will take place at Idaho National Laboratory. Westinghouse stated that they had achieved zero-power criticality on August 24, 2026.

== International business ==
=== Europe ===
Westinghouse Electric Company fully owns several subsidiaries in Europe, such as the European Service Center, also called Westinghouse Electric Belgium located in Nivelles, Belgium, where equipment is prepared for projects throughout Europe. After Westinghouse's 1990 takeover of ABB Reaktor in Germany, it transferred radiological storage activities located in Ladenburg, Germany, to consolidate in Nivelles, which had to be extended. Soon afterwards another expansion was necessary as employees in the Brussels office were transferred to Nivelles. It was estimated that 200 people were working in Nivelles at the end of 2011.

In 2001, Westinghouse took over Logitest in Les Ulis, France, one of 3 companies qualified to inspect nuclear steam generator plants for Électricité de France. After the French nuclear market partially opened in 2004 to suppliers from outside the country to fulfill European Commission directives regarding international competition, Westinghouse started to expand its business in France with a Westinghouse team located in Metz in charge of repair, replacement and automation services. By 2005, Westinghouse had 160 employees in France and two-thirds of Westinghouse's business in France was fuel supply. Westinghouse Electrique France is located in Orsay and Manosque near Marseille (engineering development). As of 2014, about 400 employees are part of Westinghouse in France.

Westinghouse owns a nuclear fuel fabrication plant at Västerås, Sweden which has provided nuclear fuel for Russian VVER-1000 nuclear reactors. In 2000 Westinghouse started development of fuel for customers in Finland and Hungary, supported by cheap Export–Import Bank of the United States loans, but the business remained small-scale in competition from cheaper Russian suppliers. A 2008 contract was agreed to supply VVER-1000 fuel; however, in trial use the fuel became deformed.

In 2015, the European Union awarded $2 million in funding to a Westinghouse-led consortium to support the development of a more competitive fuel for the Russian built reactors. In 2018, the contract to supply VVER fuel was extended to 2025. In 2018, Westinghouse, under a further EU-funded project, started developing VVER-440 fuel.

In October 2022, Westinghouse was selected to build Poland's first nuclear power plant based on three AP1000 reactors, with possibly a further three at a later date.

In April 2026, it was announced that the Finnish real estate investment company Trevian would purchase a former nuclear power plant site located by the sea in the Pyhäjoki municipality from Fennovoima, and Westinghouse would then design and build a nuclear power plant on the site.

Westinghouse also has business locations in Italy, Germany, Spain, the UK, Russia, and Bulgaria.

=== Asia ===
In South Korea, Westinghouse has been involved in the construction of new nuclear plants since 1972, with the first plant Kori Nuclear Power Plant starting up in 1977 and in commercial operation in 1978, followed by eight reactors under construction in the early 1980s. Combustion Engineering (now Westinghouse) entered into a ten-year technology transfer program with the Korean nuclear industry aiming at self-reliance, which was extended in 1997.

In December, 2006, China's State Nuclear Power Technology Company (SNPTC) selected Westinghouse to provide four new AP1000 nuclear power plants. The first was due to come on line in 2013, but has been delayed until the end of 2014.

On 7 June 2016, Nuclear Power corporation of India have agreed to begin engineering and site design work for six nuclear power reactors in India and to conclude contractual agreements by June 2017.

=== Africa ===
Westinghouse has been involved in South Africa through support of the Koeberg Nuclear Power Station since the 1990s, both reactors are Westinghouse-licensed. In 2007, Westinghouse acquired IST Nuclear (Pty) Ltd, and won the final bidding process for new nuclear plants in South Africa, for which it signed an MOU in 2013. IST Nuclear provides services and systems for the pebble-bed reactor.
