= Pressurized water reactor =

Type of nuclear reactor

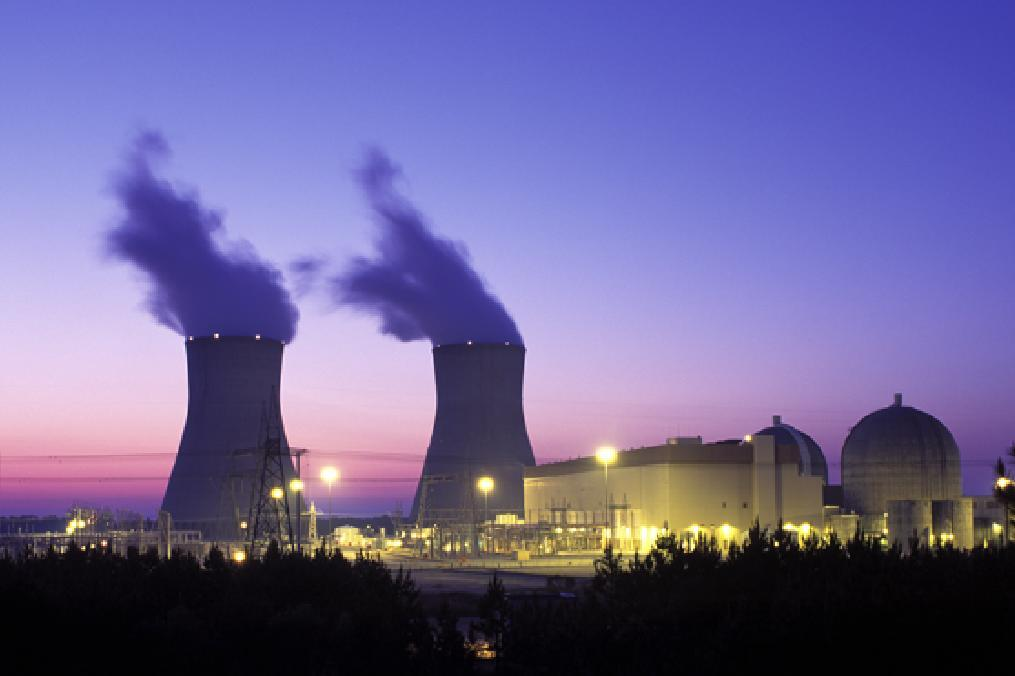
The Vogtle Nuclear Power Plant in the United States.

An animation of a PWR power station with cooling towers

A pressurized water reactor (PWR) is a type of light-water nuclear reactor. PWRs are the most common type of nuclear power reactor, representing almost 70% of the world's commercial reactor fleet. Some countries, such as Canada and (historically) the United Kingdom, have relied heavily on other designs (CANDU pressurized heavy‑water reactors and gas‑cooled reactors respectively) while others, including Japan and India, operate a mix of PWRs and other reactor types (notably boiling water reactors and pressurized heavy‑water reactors).

In a PWR, water is used both as a neutron moderator and as coolant fluid for the reactor core. In the core, water is heated by the energy released by the fission of atoms contained in the fuel. Using high pressure (around 155 bar: 2250 psi) ensures that the water stays in a liquid state. The heated water then flows to a steam generator, where it transfers its thermal energy to the water of a secondary cycle kept at a lower pressure which allows it to vaporize. The resulting steam then drives steam turbines linked to an electric generator. A boiling water reactor (BWR) by contrast does not maintain such high pressure in the primary cycle and the water vaporizes inside the reactor pressure vessel before being sent to the turbine. Most PWR designs make use of two to six steam generators (although there are some experimental and smaller designs that use one steam generator), each associated with a coolant loop.

PWRs were originally designed to serve as nuclear marine propulsion for nuclear submarines and were used in the original design of the second commercial power plant at Shippingport Atomic Power Station.

PWRs are operated in the United States, France, Russia, China, South Korea and several other countries. The majority are Generation II reactors; newer Generation III designs such as the AP1000, Hualong One, APR-1400 and VVER-1000. New Generation III+ reactor designs: the AP1000, VVER-1200, CAP-1400, and EPR. The first AP1000 and EPR reactors were connected to the power grid in China in 2018.

== History ==
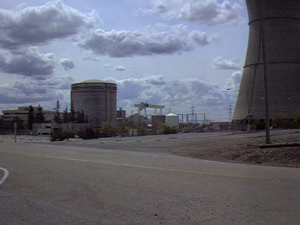
Rancho Seco PWR reactor hall and cooling tower (being decommissioned, 2004)

Development of pressurised water reactors began in 1946 with the initiation of the US Naval Nuclear Propulsion Program at Oak Ridge National Laboratory in Tennessee to develop nuclear propulsion for submarines. The first fully operational submarine power plant was located at the Idaho National Laboratory. Follow-on work was conducted by Westinghouse Bettis Atomic Power Laboratory. The first purely commercial nuclear power plant at Shippingport Atomic Power Station was originally designed as a pressurized water reactor (although the first power plant connected to the grid was at Obninsk, USSR), on insistence from Admiral Hyman G. Rickover that a viable commercial plant would include none of the "crazy thermodynamic cycles that everyone else wants to build".

The United States Army Nuclear Power Program operated pressurized water reactors from 1954 to 1974. Three Mile Island Nuclear Generating Station initially operated two pressurized water reactor plants, TMI-1 and TMI-2. The partial meltdown of TMI-2 in 1979 essentially ended the growth in new construction of nuclear power plants in the United States for two decades. Watts Bar unit 2 (a Westinghouse 4-loop PWR) came online in 2016, becoming the first new nuclear reactor in the United States since 1996.

In 2020, NuScale Power became the first U.S. company to receive regulatory approval from the Nuclear Regulatory Commission for a small modular reactor with a modified PWR design. Also in 2020, the Energy Impact Center introduced the OPEN100 project, which published open-source blueprints for the construction of a 100 MW_{electric} nuclear power plant with a PWR design.

== Design ==
Pictorial explanation of power transfer in a pressurized water reactor. Primary coolant is in orange and the secondary coolant (steam and later feedwater) is in blue.

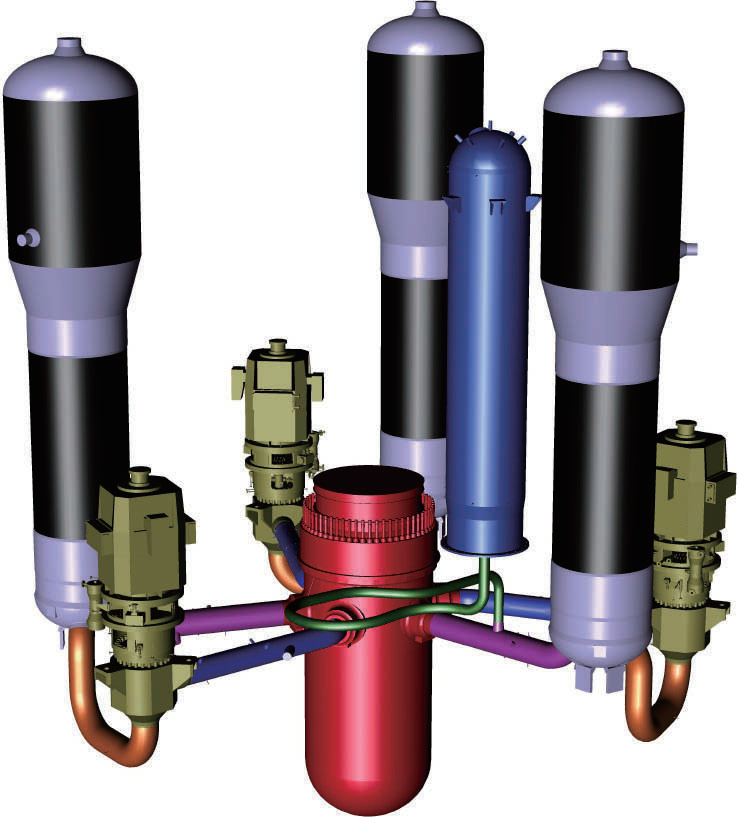
Primary coolant system showing reactor pressure vessel (red), steam generators (purple), Pressurizer (blue), and pumps (green) in the three coolant loop Hualong One design

Nuclear fuel in the reactor pressure vessel is engaged in a controlled fission chain reaction, which produces heat, heating the water in the primary coolant loop by thermal conduction through the fuel cladding. The hot primary coolant is pumped into a heat exchanger called the steam generator, where it flows through several thousand small tubes. Heat is transferred through the walls of these tubes to the lower pressure secondary coolant located on the shell side of the exchanger where the secondary coolant evaporates to pressurized steam. This transfer of heat is accomplished without mixing the two fluids to prevent the secondary coolant from becoming radioactive. Some common steam generator arrangements are u-tubes or single pass heat exchangers.

In a nuclear power station, the pressurized steam is fed through a steam turbine which drives an electrical generator connected to the electric grid for transmission. After passing through the turbine the secondary coolant (water-steam mixture) is cooled and condensed in a condenser. The condenser converts the steam to a liquid so that it can be pumped back into the steam generator and maintains a vacuum at the turbine outlet so that the pressure drop across the turbine, and hence the energy extracted from the steam, is maximized. Before being fed into the steam generator, the condensed steam (referred to as feedwater) is sometimes preheated in order to minimize thermal shock.

The steam generated has other uses besides power generation. In nuclear ships and submarines, the steam is fed through a steam turbine connected to a set of speed reduction gears to a shaft used for propulsion. Direct mechanical action by expansion of the steam can be used for a steam-powered aircraft catapult or similar applications. District heating by the steam is used in some countries and direct heating is applied to internal plant applications.

Two characteristics for pressurized water reactor when compared with other reactor types are: coolant loop separation from the steam system and pressure inside the primary coolant loop. In a PWR, there are two coolant loops (primary and secondary), which are both filled with demineralized/deionized water. A boiling water reactor, by contrast, has one coolant loop, while more exotic designs such as breeder reactors use substances other than water for coolant and moderator (e.g. sodium in its liquid state as coolant or graphite as a moderator). The pressure in the primary coolant loop is typically 15–16 megapascals (150–160 bar), which is notably higher than in other nuclear reactors, and nearly twice that of a boiling water reactor. As an effect of this, only localized boiling occurs and steam will recondense promptly in the bulk fluid. By contrast, in a boiling water reactor, the primary coolant is designed to boil.

== Reactor ==
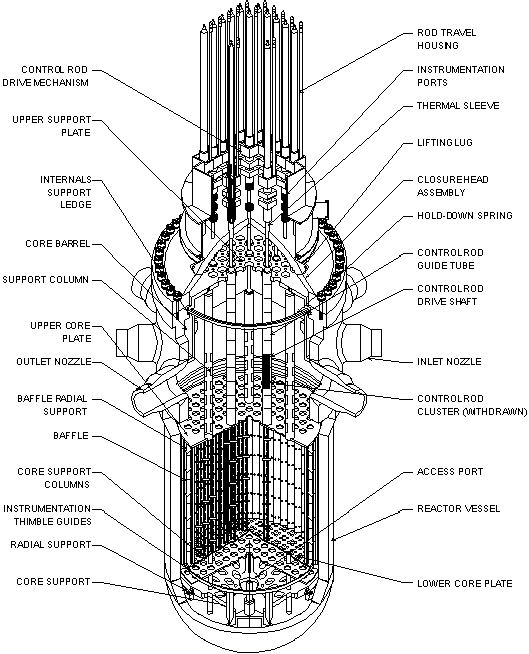
PWR reactor pressure vessel

=== Coolant ===
Light water is used as the primary coolant in a PWR. Water enters through the bottom of the reactor's core at about 548 K (275 °C; 527 °F) and is heated as it flows upwards through the reactor core to a temperature of about 588 K (315 °C; 599 °F). The water remains liquid despite the high temperature due to the high pressure in the primary coolant loop, usually around 155 bar (15.5 MPa, 153 atm, 2,250 psi). The water in a PWR cannot exceed a temperature of 647 K (374 °C; 705 °F) or a pressure of 22.064 MPa (3200 psi or 218 atm), because those are the critical point of water. Supercritical water reactors are (as of 2022) only a proposed concept in which the coolant would never leave the supercritical state. However, as this requires higher pressures than a PWR and can cause issues of corrosion, no such reactor has yet been built.

=== Pressurizer ===
Pressure in the primary circuit is maintained by a pressurizer, a separate vessel that is connected to the primary circuit and partially filled with water which is heated to the saturation temperature (boiling point) for the desired pressure by submerged electrical heaters. To achieve a pressure of 155 bars (15.5 MPa), the pressurizer temperature is maintained at 345 °C (653 °F), which gives a subcooling margin (the difference between the pressurizer temperature and the highest temperature in the reactor core) of 30 °C (54 °F). As 345 °C is the boiling point of water at 155 bar, the liquid water is at the edge of a phase change. Thermal transients in the reactor coolant system result in large swings in pressurizer liquid/steam volume, and total pressurizer volume is designed around absorbing these transients without uncovering the heaters or emptying the pressurizer. Pressure transients in the primary coolant system manifest as temperature transients in the pressurizer and are controlled through the use of automatic heaters and water spray, which raise and lower pressurizer temperature, respectively.

=== Pumps ===
The coolant is pumped around the primary circuit by powerful pumps. These pumps have a rate of ~100,000 gallons of coolant per minute. After picking up heat as it passes through the reactor core, the primary coolant transfers heat in a steam generator to water in a lower pressure secondary circuit, evaporating the secondary coolant to saturated steam—in most designs 6.2 MPa (60 atm, 900 psia), 275 °C (530 °F)—for use in the steam turbine. The cooled primary coolant is then returned to the reactor vessel to be heated again.

== Moderator ==
Pressurized water reactors, like all thermal reactor designs, require the fast fission neutrons to be slowed (a process called moderation or thermalizing) in order to interact with the nuclear fuel and sustain the chain reaction. In PWRs the coolant water is used as a moderator by letting the neutrons undergo multiple collisions with light hydrogen atoms in the water, losing speed in the process. This "moderating" of neutrons will happen more often when the water is more dense (more collisions will occur). The use of water as a moderator is an important safety feature of PWRs, as an increase in temperature may cause the water to expand, giving greater 'gaps' between the water molecules and reducing the probability of thermalization—thereby reducing the extent to which neutrons are slowed and hence reducing the reactivity in the reactor. Therefore, if reactivity increases beyond normal, the reduced moderation of neutrons will cause the chain reaction to slow, producing less heat. This property, known as the negative temperature coefficient of reactivity, makes PWR reactors stable. This process is referred to as 'self-regulating', i.e. the hotter the coolant becomes, the less reactive the plant becomes, shutting itself down slightly to compensate and vice versa. Thus the plant controls itself around a given temperature set by the position of the control rods.

In contrast, the Soviet RBMK reactor design used at Chernobyl, Ukraine, which uses graphite instead of water as the moderator and uses boiling water as the coolant, has a large positive thermal coefficient of reactivity. This means reactivity and heat generation increases when coolant and fuel temperatures increase, which makes the RBMK design less stable than pressurized water reactors at high operating temperature. In addition to its property of slowing neutrons when serving as a moderator, water also has a property of absorbing neutrons, albeit to a lesser degree. When the coolant water temperature increases, the boiling increases, which creates voids. Thus there is less water to absorb thermal neutrons that have already been slowed by the graphite moderator, causing an increase in reactivity. This property is called the void coefficient of reactivity, and in an RBMK reactor like Chernobyl, the void coefficient is positive, and fairly large, making it very hard to regulate when the reaction begins to run away. The RBMK reactors also have a flawed control rod design in which during rapid scrams, the graphite reaction enhancement tips of the rods would displace water at the bottom of the reactor and locally increase reactivity there. This is called the "positive scram effect" that is unique to the flawed RBMK control rods design. These design flaws, in addition to operator errors that pushed the reactor to its limits, are generally seen as the causes of the Chernobyl disaster.

The Canadian CANDU heavy water reactor design has a slight positive void coefficient. These reactors mitigate this issue with a number of built-in advanced passive safety systems not found in the Soviet RBMK design. No criticality could occur in a CANDU reactor or any other heavy water reactor when ordinary light water is supplied to the reactor as an emergency coolant. Depending on burnup, boric acid or another neutron poison would have to be added to emergency coolant to avoid a criticality accident.

PWRs are designed to be maintained in an undermoderated state, meaning that there is room for increased water volume or density to further increase moderation, because if moderation were near saturation, then a reduction in density of the moderator/coolant could reduce neutron absorption significantly while reducing moderation only slightly, making the void coefficient positive. Also, light water is actually a somewhat stronger moderator of neutrons than heavy water, though heavy water's neutron absorption is much lower. Because of these two facts, light water reactors have a relatively small moderator volume and therefore have compact cores. One next generation design, the supercritical water reactor, is even less moderated. A less moderated neutron energy spectrum worsens the capture/fission ratio for ^{235}U and especially ^{239}Pu, meaning that more fissile nuclei fail to fission on neutron absorption and instead capture the neutron to become a heavier nonfissile isotope, wasting one or more neutrons and increasing accumulation of heavy transuranic actinides, some of which have long half-lives.

=== Fuel ===
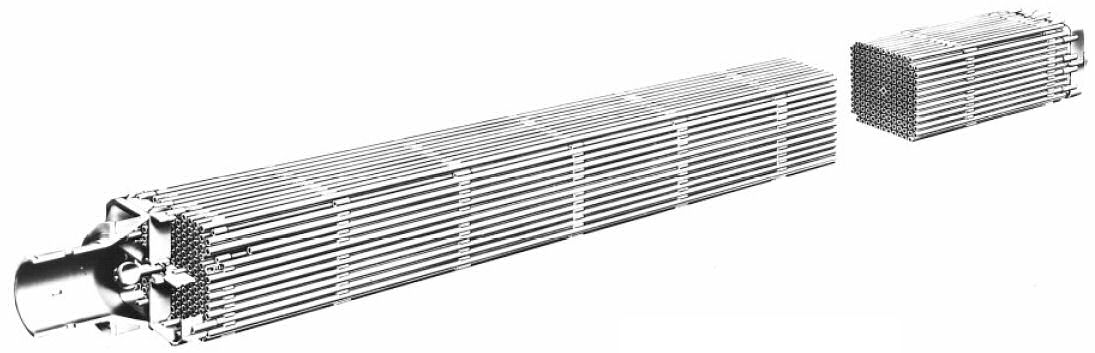
PWR fuel bundle This fuel bundle is from a pressurized water reactor of the nuclear passenger and cargo ship NS Savannah. Designed and built by Babcock & Wilcox.

After enrichment, the uranium dioxide (UO_{2}) powder is fired in a high-temperature, sintering furnace to create hard, ceramic pellets of enriched uranium dioxide. The cylindrical pellets are then clad in a corrosion-resistant zirconium metal alloy, Zircaloy, which are backfilled with helium to aid heat conduction and detect leakages. Zircaloy is chosen because of its mechanical properties and its low absorption cross section. The finished fuel rods are grouped in fuel assemblies, called fuel bundles, that are then used to build the core of the reactor. A typical PWR has fuel assemblies of 200 to 300 rods each, and a large reactor would have about 150–250 such assemblies with 80–100 tons of uranium in all. Generally, the fuel bundles consist of fuel rods bundled 14 × 14 to 17 × 17. A PWR produces on the order of 900 to 1,600 MW_{e}. PWR fuel bundles are about 4 meters in length.

Refuelings for most commercial PWRs is on an 18–24 month cycle. Approximately one third of the core is replaced each refueling, though some more modern refueling schemes may reduce refuel time to a few days and allow refueling to occur on a shorter periodicity.

=== Control ===
In PWRs reactor power can be viewed as following steam (turbine) demand due to the reactivity feedback of the temperature change caused by increased or decreased steam flow. (See: Negative temperature coefficient.) Boron and cadmium control rods are used to maintain primary system temperature at the desired point. In order to decrease power, the operator throttles shut turbine inlet valves. This would result in less steam being drawn from the steam generators. This results in the primary loop increasing in temperature. The higher temperature causes the density of the primary reactor coolant water to decrease, allowing higher neutron speeds, thus less fission and decreased power output. This decrease of power will eventually result in primary system temperature returning to its previous steady-state value. The operator can control the steady state operating temperature by addition of boric acid and/or movement of control rods.

Reactivity adjustment to maintain 100% power as the fuel is burned in most commercial PWRs is normally achieved by varying the concentration of boric acid dissolved in the primary reactor coolant. Boron readily absorbs neutrons and increasing or decreasing its concentration in the reactor coolant will therefore affect the neutron activity correspondingly. An entire control system involving high pressure pumps (usually called the charging and letdown system) is required to remove water from the high pressure primary loop and re-inject the water back in with differing concentrations of boric acid. The reactor control rods, inserted through the reactor vessel head directly into the fuel bundles, are moved for the following reasons: to start the reactor, to shut down the primary nuclear reactions in the reactor, and to accommodate short term transients, such as changes to load on the turbine.

The control rods can also be used to compensate for so-called nuclear poison inventory and to compensate for nuclear fuel depletion. However, these effects are more usually accommodated by altering the primary coolant boric acid concentration.

In contrast, BWRs have no boron in the reactor coolant and control the reactor power by adjusting the reactor coolant flow rate.

== Advantages ==
PWR reactors are very stable due to their tendency to produce less power as temperatures increase; this makes the reactor easier to operate from a stability standpoint.

The PWR turbine cycle loop is separate from the primary loop, so the water in the secondary loop is not contaminated by radioactive materials.

PWRs can passively scram the reactor in case offsite power is lost to immediately stop the primary nuclear reaction. The control rods are held by electromagnets and fall by gravity when current is lost; full insertion safely shuts down the primary nuclear reaction.

PWR technology is favoured by nations seeking to develop a nuclear navy; the compact reactors fit well in nuclear submarines and other nuclear ships.

PWRs are the most deployed type of reactor globally, allowing for a wide range of suppliers of new plants and parts for existing plants. Due to long experience with their operation, they are the most mature technology in nuclear energy.

PWRs, depending on type, can be fueled with MOX-fuel and/or the Russian Remix Fuel (which has a lower ^{239}Pu and a higher ^{235}U content than "regular" U/Pu MOX-fuel) allowing for a (partially) closed nuclear fuel cycle.

Water is a nontoxic, transparent, chemically unreactive (by comparison with e.g. NaK) coolant that is liquid at room temperature which makes visual inspection and maintenance easier. It is also easy and inexpensive to obtain unlike heavy water or even nuclear graphite.

Compared to reactors operating on natural uranium, PWRs can achieve a relatively high burnup. A typical PWR will exchange a quarter to a third of its fuel load every 18–24 months and have maintenance and inspection, that requires the reactor to be shut down, scheduled for this window. While more uranium ore is consumed per unit of electricity produced than in a natural uranium fueled reactor, the amount of spent fuel is less with the balance being depleted uranium whose radiological danger is lower than that of natural uranium.

== Disadvantages ==
The coolant water must be highly pressurized to remain liquid at high temperatures. This requires high-strength piping and a heavy pressure vessel and hence increases construction costs. The higher pressure can increase the consequences of a loss-of-coolant accident. The reactor pressure vessel is manufactured from ductile steel but, as the plant is operated, neutron flux from the reactor causes this steel to become less ductile. Eventually the ductility of the steel will reach limits determined by the applicable boiler and pressure vessel standards, and the pressure vessel must be repaired or replaced. This might not be practical or economic, and so determines the life of the plant.

Additional high-pressure components such as reactor coolant pumps, pressurizer, and steam generators are also needed. This also increases the capital cost and complexity of a PWR power plant.

The high-temperature water coolant with boric acid dissolved in it is corrosive to carbon steel (but not stainless steel); this can cause radioactive corrosion products to circulate in the primary coolant loop. This not only limits the lifetime of the reactor, but the systems that filter out the corrosion products and adjust the boric acid concentration add significantly to the overall cost of the reactor and to radiation exposure. In one instance, this has resulted in severe corrosion to control rod drive mechanisms when the boric acid solution leaked through the seal between the mechanism and the primary system.

Due to the requirement to load a pressurized water reactor's primary coolant loop with boron, undesirable radioactive secondary tritium production in the water is over 25 times greater than in boiling water reactors of similar power, owing to the latter's absence of the neutron moderating element in its coolant loop. The tritium is created by the absorption of a fast neutron in the nucleus of a boron-10 atom which subsequently splits into a lithium-7 and tritium atom. Pressurized water reactors annually emit several hundred curies of tritium to the environment as part of normal operation.

Natural uranium is only 0.7% uranium-235, the isotope necessary for thermal reactors. This makes it necessary to enrich the uranium fuel, which significantly increases the costs of fuel production. Compared to reactors operating on natural uranium, less energy is generated per unit of uranium ore even though a higher burnup can be achieved. Nuclear reprocessing can "stretch" the fuel supply of both natural uranium and enriched uranium reactors but is virtually only practiced for light-water reactors operating with lightly enriched fuel as spent fuel from e.g. CANDU reactors is very low in fissile material.

Because water acts as a neutron moderator, it is not possible to build a fast-neutron reactor with a PWR design. A reduced moderation water reactor may however achieve a breeding ratio greater than unity, though this reactor design has disadvantages of its own.

Thermal efficiency, while better than for boiling water reactors, cannot achieve the values of reactors with higher operating temperatures such as those cooled with high-temperature gases, liquid metals or molten salts. Similarly process heat drawn from a PWR is not suitable for most industrial applications as those require temperatures in excess of 400 °C (752 °F).

Radiolysis and certain accident scenarios which involve interactions between hot steam and zircalloy cladding can produce hydrogen from the cooling water leading to hydrogen explosions as a potential accident scenario. During the Fukushima nuclear accident a hydrogen explosion damaging the containment building was a major concern, though the reactors at the plant were BWRs, which owing to the steam at the top of the pressure vessel by design carry a greater risk of this happening. Some reactors contain catalytic recombiners which let the hydrogen react with ambient oxygen in a non-explosive fashion.

== Examples ==
- Areva EPR
- Chinese Hualong One (or HPR1000)
- Chinese SNPTC CAP-1400
- Indian IPWR-900
- KEPCO Advanced Power Reactor 1400 (APR-1400)
- Rosatom VVER-1200 (or AES-2006)
- Westinghouse Advanced Passive 1000 (AP1000)

== See also ==
- List of PWR reactors
- Boiling water reactor
- Molten-salt reactor
- Nuclear safety systems
