= Economics of nuclear power =

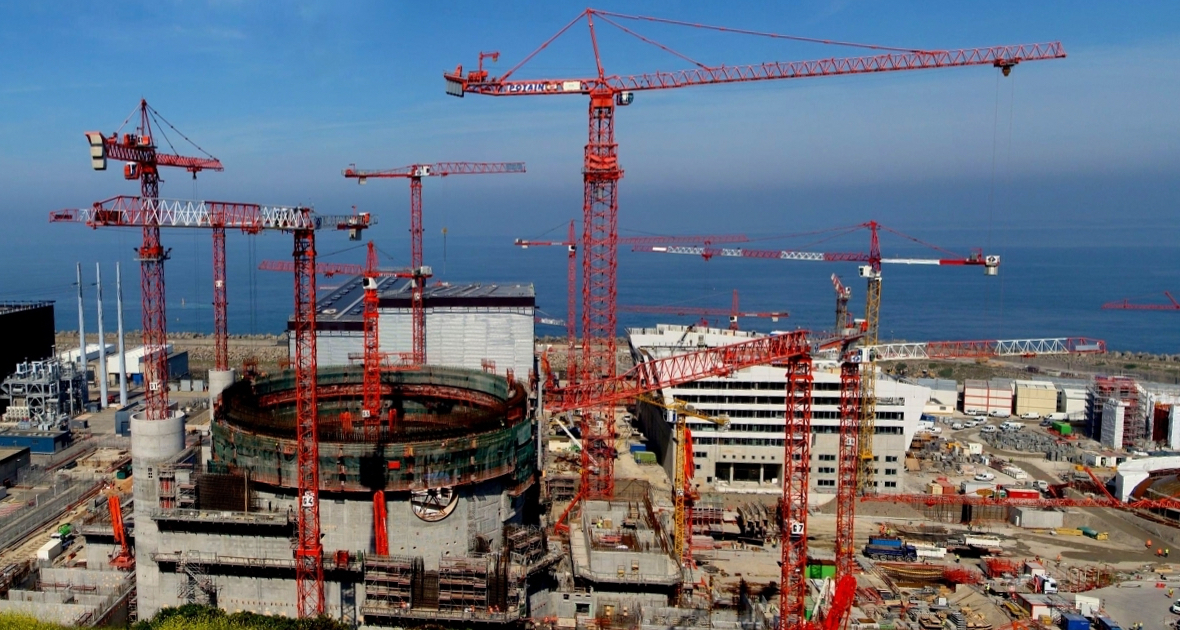
Flamanville 3, seen here under construction in 2010, had an initial estimated cost in 2007 of €3.3 billion. By the time the reactor went online in 2024, the final cost had risen to an estimate €13.2 billion.

The economics of nuclear power concerns the costs, financial risks, and economic factors involved in generating electricity from nuclear reactors, including the capital required to build plants, the operating and fuel costs over their lifetime, and the expenses of decommissioning and managing radioactive waste. It also encompasses the broader policy, regulatory, and market conditions that influence the competitiveness of nuclear power relative to other energy sources, such as financing structures, carbon‑pricing mechanisms, and system‑integration requirements.

Nuclear power construction costs have varied significantly across the world and over time. Rapid increases in costs occurred during the 1970s, especially in the United States. Recent cost trends in countries such as Japan and Korea have been very different, including periods of stability and decline in construction costs.

New nuclear power plants typically have high capital expenditure for building plants. Fuel, operational, and maintenance costs are relatively small components of the total cost. The long service life and high capacity factor of nuclear power plants allow sufficient funds for ultimate plant decommissioning and waste storage and management to be accumulated, with little impact on the price per unit of electricity generated. Additionally, measures to mitigate climate change such as a carbon tax or carbon emissions trading, favor the economics of nuclear power over fossil fuel power. Nuclear power is cost competitive with the renewable generation when the capital cost is between $2000 and $3000/kW, although in some rare cases this value has been significantly higher due to unforeseen issues, as for example in the third unit in Olkiluoto, Finland at an estimated 6800€/kW.

== Overview ==
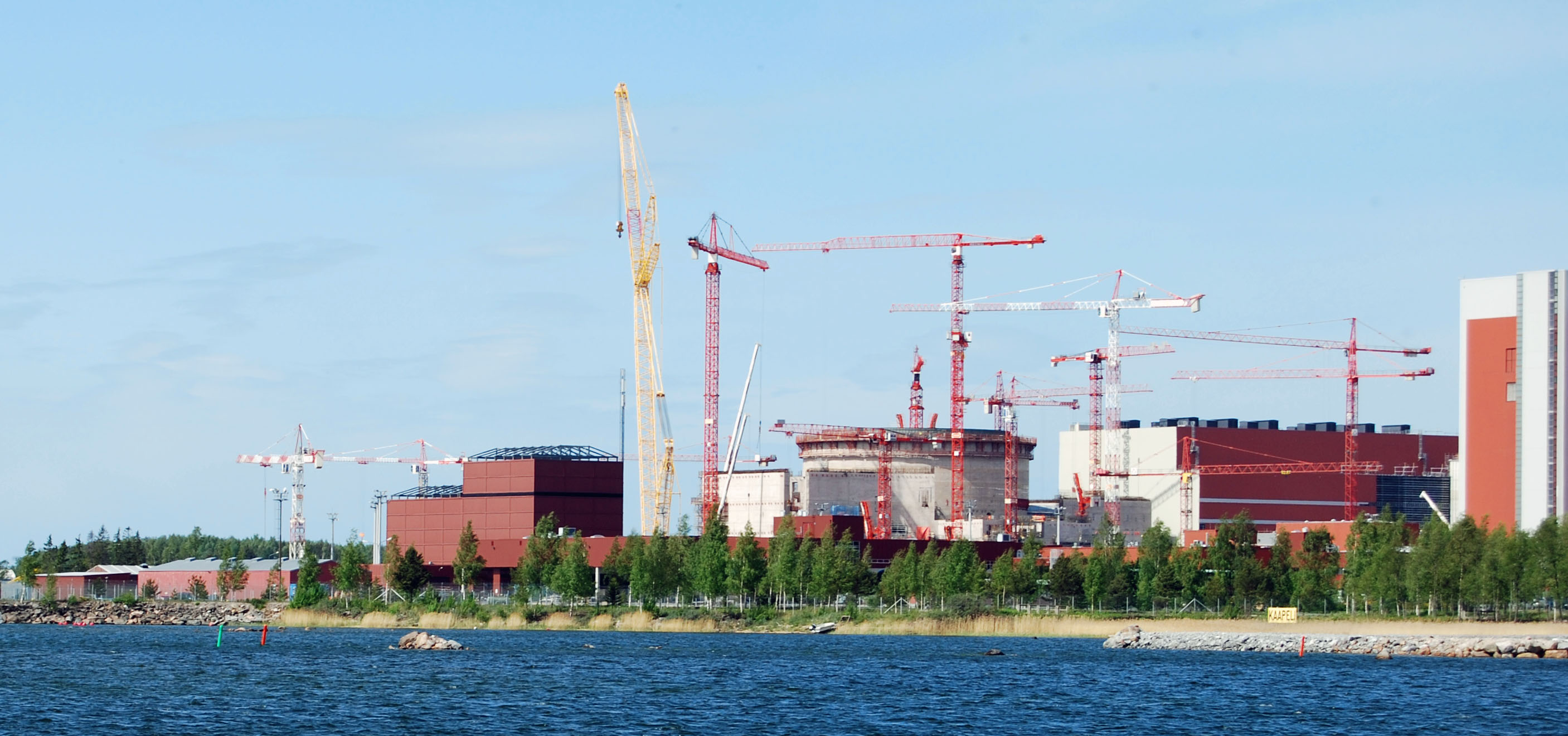
Olkiluoto 3 while under construction in 2009. Construction experienced multiple delays, contributing to increased costs

The Intergovernmental Panel on Climate Change (IPCC) describes nuclear power as a low-carbon, mature energy source. Although its share of global electricity generation has been declining since 1993, the IPCC notes that nuclear power could contribute to low-carbon energy supply. IPCC's assessment identifies several barriers, including unresolved waste management issues, public acceptance, operational, financial, and regulatory risks.

Solar power has very low capacity factors compared to nuclear, and solar power can only achieve so much market penetration before (expensive) energy storage and transmission become necessary. This is because nuclear power "requires less maintenance and is designed to operate for longer stretches before refueling" while solar power is in a constant state of refueling and is limited by a lack of fuel that requires a backup power source that works on a larger scale.

In the United States, nuclear power faces competition from the low natural gas prices in North America. Former Exelon CEO John Rowe said in 2012 that new nuclear plants in the United States "don't make any sense right now" and won't be economic as long as the natural gas surplus persists.

In 2016, the Governor of New York, Andrew Cuomo, directed the New York Public Service Commission to consider ratepayer-financed subsidies similar to those for renewable sources to keep nuclear power stations (which accounted for one third of the state's generation, and half of its emissions-free generation) profitable in the competition against natural gas plants, which have replaced nuclear plants when they closed in other states.

A 2017 analysis by Bloomberg showed that over half of U.S. nuclear plants were running at a loss, first of all those at a single unit site.

A 2019 study by the economic think tank DIW Berlin, found that nuclear power has not been profitable anywhere in the world. The study of the economics of nuclear power has found it has never been financially viable, that most plants have been built while heavily subsidised by governments, often motivated by military purposes, and that nuclear power is not a good approach to tackling climate change. It found, after reviewing trends in nuclear power plant construction since 1951, that the average 1,000MW nuclear power plant would incur an average economic loss of 4.8 billion euros ($7.7 billion AUD). These findings were refuted in a follow-up study, published in the International Journal for Nuclear Power, a journal issued by the pro-nuclear German Nuclear Society (Kerntechnische Gesellschaft e.V.).

== Capital costs ==
Nuclear Power requires significant upfront investment before becoming a cost stable power generation source. Nuclear power is baseload power, similar to hydroelectric or methane gas power plants. Methane gas and coal power plants are cheaper to build in upfront cost but come with cost risks that nuclear plants avoid such as vulnerability to fluctuations in the global economy, energy prices, climate and health costs. Nuclear costs upfront and ongoing are susceptible to price changes related to regulations in both site permitting and safe storage of spent fuel. However, in and of itself, nuclear projects are not inherently vastly riskier than other large infrastructure investments. After the Great Recession, when the worldwide demand for electricity fell, regulations became more permissive of unclean but cheap energy.

In Eastern Europe, a number of long-established projects are struggling to find financing, notably Belene in Bulgaria and the additional reactors at Cernavoda in Romania, and some potential backers have pulled out. Where cheap gas is available and its future supply relatively secure, this also poses a major problem for clean energy projects.

Therefore, comparison with other power generation methods is strongly dependent on assumptions about construction timescales and capital financing for nuclear plants. Analysis of the economics of nuclear power must take into account who bears the risks of future uncertainties. To date all operating nuclear power plants were developed by state-owned or regulated utility monopolies where many of the risks associated with political change and regulatory ratcheting were borne by consumers rather than suppliers.

Many countries have now liberalized the electricity market where these risks, and the risk of cheap competition from subsidised energy sources emerging before capital costs are recovered, are borne by plant suppliers and operators rather than consumers, which leads to a significantly different evaluation of the risk of investing in new nuclear power plants. Generation III+ reactors are claimed to have a significantly longer design lifetime than their predecessors while using gradual improvements on existing designs that have been used for decades. This might offset higher construction costs to a degree, by giving a longer depreciation lifetime.

=== Construction costs ===
"The usual rule of thumb for nuclear power is that about two thirds of the generation cost is accounted for by fixed costs, the main ones being the cost of paying interest on the loans and repaying the capital..."

Capital cost, the building and financing of nuclear power plants, represents a large percentage of the cost of nuclear electricity. In 2014, the US Energy Information Administration estimated that for new nuclear plants going online in 2019, capital costs will make up 74% of the levelized cost of electricity; higher than the capital percentages for fossil-fuel power plants (63% for coal, 22% for natural gas), and lower than the capital percentages for some other nonfossil-fuel sources (80% for wind, 88% for solar PV).

Areva, the French nuclear plant operator, offers that 70% of the cost of a kWh of nuclear electricity is accounted for by the fixed costs from the construction process. Some analysts argue (for example Steve Thomas quoted in the book The Doomsday Machine by Martin Cohen and Andrew McKillop) that what is often not appreciated in debates about the economics of nuclear power is that the cost of equity, that is companies using their own money to pay for new plants, is generally higher than the cost of debt. Another advantage of borrowing may be that "once large loans have been arranged at low interest rates – perhaps with government support – the money can then be lent out at higher rates of return".

"One of the big problems with nuclear power is the enormous upfront cost. These reactors are extremely expensive to build. While the returns may be very great, they're also very slow. It can sometimes take decades to recoup initial costs. Since many investors have a short attention span, they don't like to wait that long for their investment to pay off."

Because of the large capital costs for the initial nuclear power plants built as part of a sustained build program and the relatively long construction period before revenue is returned, servicing the capital costs of the first few nuclear power plants can be the most important factor determining the economic competitiveness of nuclear energy. The investment can contribute about 70% to 80% of the costs of electricity. Timothy Stone, businessman and nuclear expert, stated in 2017, "It has long been recognized that the only two numbers which matter in [new] nuclear power are the capital cost and the cost of capital." The discount rate chosen to cost a nuclear power plant's capital over its lifetime is arguably the most sensitive parameter to overall costs. Because of the long life of new nuclear power plants, most of the value of a new nuclear power plant is created for the benefit of future generations.

The recent liberalization of the electricity market in many countries has made the economics of nuclear power generation less enticing, and as of 2015, no new nuclear power plants have been built in a liberalized electricity market. Previously, a monopolistic provider could guarantee output requirements decades into the future. Private generating companies now have to accept shorter output contracts and the risks of future lower-cost competition, so they desire a shorter return on investment period. This favours generation plant types with lower capital costs or high subsidies, even if associated fuel costs are higher.

A further difficulty is that due to the large sunk costs but unpredictable future income from the liberalized electricity market, private capital is unlikely to be available on favourable terms, which is particularly significant for nuclear as it is capital-intensive. Industry consensus is that a 5% discount rate is appropriate for plants operating in a regulated utility environment where revenues are guaranteed by captive markets, and 10% discount rate is appropriate for a competitive deregulated or merchant plant environment. However, an independent Massachusetts Institute of Technology (MIT) study (2003) which used a more sophisticated finance model distinguishing equity and debt capital had a higher 11.5% average discount rate.

A 2016 study argued that while costs did increase in the past for reactors built in the past, this does not necessarily mean there is an inherent trend of cost escalation with nuclear power, as prior studies tended to examine a relatively small share of reactors built and that a full analysis shows that cost trends for reactors varied substantially by country and era.

Another important factor in estimating a NPPs lifetime cost derives from its capacity factor. According to Anthonie Cilliers, a scholar and nuclear engineer, "Because of the large capital investment, and the low variable cost of operations, nuclear plants are most cost effective when they can run all the time to provide a return on the investment. Hence, plant operators now consistently achieve 92 percent capacity factor (average power produced of maximum capacity). The higher the capacity factor, the lower the cost per unit of electricity."

=== Delays and overruns ===
Construction delays can add significantly to the cost of a plant. Since a power plant does not earn income during construction, and interest must be paid on debt from the time it is incurred, longer construction times translate directly into higher finance charges.

Modern nuclear power plants are planned for construction in five years or less (42 months for Canada Deuterium Uranium (CANDU) ACR-1000, 60 months from order to operation for an AP1000, 48 months from first concrete to operation for a European Pressurized Reactor (EPR) and 45 months for an ESBWR) as opposed to over a decade for some previous plants.

In Japan and France, construction costs and delays are significantly diminished because of streamlined government licensing and certification procedures. In France, one model of reactor was type-certified, using a safety engineering process similar to the process used to certify aircraft models for safety. That is, rather than licensing individual reactors, the regulatory agency certified a particular design and its construction process to produce safe reactors. U.S. law permits type-licensing of reactors, a process which is being used on the AP1000 and the ESBWR.

Canada has cost overruns for the Darlington Nuclear Generating Station, largely due to delays and policy changes, that are often cited by opponents of new reactors. Construction started in 1981 at an estimated cost of $7.4 Billion 1993-adjusted CAD, and finished in 1993 at a cost of $14.5 billion. 70% of the price increase was due to interest charges incurred due to delays imposed to postpone units 3 and 4, 46% inflation over a 4-year period and other changes in financial policy.

In the United Kingdom and the United States cost overruns on nuclear plants contributed to the bankruptcies of several utility companies. In the United States these losses helped usher in energy deregulation in the mid-1990s that saw rising electricity rates and power blackouts in California. When the UK began privatizing utilities, its nuclear reactors "were so unprofitable they could not be sold." Eventually in 1996, the government gave them away. But the company that took them over, British Energy, had to be bailed out in 2004 to the extent of 3.4 billion pounds.

== Operational costs ==
The operational cost of a nuclear power plant is the cost of all the expenses to keep the plant running. It includes fuel, waste disposal, decommissioning, operator wages and maintenance costs.

=== Fuel ===
In 2007, fuel costs account for about 28% of a nuclear plant's operating expenses. As of 2013, half the cost of reactor fuel was taken up by enrichment and fabrication, so that the cost of the uranium concentrate raw material was 14 percent of operating costs. Doubling the price of uranium would add about 10% to the cost of electricity produced in existing nuclear plants, and about half that much to the cost of electricity in future power plants. The cost of raw uranium contributes about $0.0015/kWh to the cost of nuclear electricity, while in breeder reactors the uranium cost falls to $0.000015/kWh.

Nuclear plants require fissile fuel. Generally, the fuel used is uranium, although other materials may be used (See MOX fuel). In 2005, prices on the world market for uranium averaged US$20/lb (US$44.09/kg). On 2007-04-19, prices reached US$113/lb (US$249.12/kg). On 2008-07-02, the price had dropped to $59/lb.

As of 2008, mining activity was growing rapidly, especially from smaller companies, but putting a uranium deposit into production takes 10 years or more. The world's present measured resources of uranium, economically recoverable at a price of US$130/kg according to the industry groups Organisation for Economic Co-operation and Development (OECD), Nuclear Energy Agency (NEA) and International Atomic Energy Agency (IAEA), are enough to last for "at least a century" at current consumption rates.

According to the World Nuclear Association, "the world's present measured resources of uranium (5.7 Mt) in the cost category less than three times present spot prices and used only in conventional reactors, are enough to last for about 90 years. This represents a higher level of assured resources than is normal for most minerals. Further exploration and higher prices will certainly, on the basis of present geological knowledge, yield further resources as present ones are used up." The amount of uranium present in all currently known conventional reserves alone (excluding the huge quantities of currently-uneconomical uranium present in "unconventional" reserves such as phosphate/phosphorite deposits, seawater, and other sources) is enough to last over 200 years at current consumption rates.

=== Waste disposal ===
All nuclear plants produce radioactive waste. In order to pay for the cost of storing, transporting and disposing these wastes in a permanent location in the United States, a surcharge of a tenth of a cent per kilowatt-hour is added to electricity bills. Roughly one percent of electrical utility bills in provinces using nuclear power are diverted to fund nuclear waste disposal in Canada.

The disposal of low level waste reportedly costs around £2,000/m³ in the UK. High level waste costs somewhere between £67,000/m³ and £201,000/m³. General division is 80%/20% of low level/high level waste, and one reactor produces roughly 12 m³ of high level waste annually.

=== Decommissioning ===
At the end of a nuclear plant's lifetime, the plant must be decommissioned. This entails either dismantling, safe storage or entombment. In the United States, the Nuclear Regulatory Commission (NRC) requires plants to finish the process within 60 years of closing. Since it costs around $500 million or more to shut down and decommission a plant, the NRC requires plant owners to set aside money when the plant is still operating to pay for the future shutdown costs.

Decommissioning a reactor that has undergone a meltdown is inevitably more difficult and expensive. Three Mile Island (in Pennsylvania) was decommissioned 14 years after its incident for $837 million. The cost of the Fukushima disaster cleanup (in Japan) is not yet known, but has been estimated to cost around $100 billion.

=== Proliferation and terrorism ===
A 2011 report for the Union of Concerned Scientists stated that "the costs of preventing nuclear proliferation and terrorism should be recognized as negative externalities of civilian nuclear power, thoroughly evaluated, and integrated into economic assessments—just as global warming emissions are increasingly identified as a cost in the economics of coal-fired electricity".

=== Insurance ===
Insurance available to the operators of nuclear power plants varies by nation. The worst case nuclear accident costs are so large that it would be difficult for the private insurance industry to carry the size of the risk, and the premium cost of full insurance would make nuclear energy uneconomic.

Nuclear power has largely worked under an insurance framework that limits or structures accident liabilities in accordance with the Paris convention on nuclear third-party liability, the Brussels supplementary convention, the Vienna convention on civil liability for nuclear damage, and in the United States the Price-Anderson Act. It is often argued that this potential shortfall in liability represents an external cost not included in the cost of nuclear electricity.

In Canada, the Canadian Nuclear Liability Act requires nuclear power plant operators to obtain $650 million (CAD) of liability insurance coverage per installation regardless of the number of individual reactors present, starting in 2017 (up from the prior $75 million requirement established in 1976), increasing to $750 million in 2018, to $850 million in 2019, and to $1 billion in 2020. Claims beyond the insured amount would be assessed by a government appointed but independent tribunal, and paid by the federal government.

In the UK, the Nuclear Installations Act 1965 governs liability for nuclear damage for which a UK nuclear licensee is responsible. The limit for the operator is £140 million.

In the United States, the Price-Anderson Act has governed the insurance of the nuclear power industry since 1957. Owners of nuclear power plants are required to pay a premium each year for the maximum obtainable amount of private insurance ($450 million) for each licensed reactor unit. This primary or "first tier" insurance is supplemented by a second tier. In the event a nuclear accident incurs damages in excess of $450 million, each licensee would be assessed a prorated share of the excess up to $121,255,000.

With 104 reactors currently licensed to operate in the U.S., this secondary tier of funds contains about $12.61 billion. This results in a maximum combined primary+secondary coverage amount of up to $13.06 billion for a hypothetical single-reactor incident. If 15 percent of these funds are expended, prioritization of the remaining amount would be left to a federal district court. If the second tier is depleted, Congress is committed to determine whether additional disaster relief is required. In July 2005, Congress extended the Price-Anderson Act to newer facilities.

== Cost per kWh ==
The cost per unit of electricity produced (Kilowatt-hour, kWh, or Megawatt-hour, MWh = 1,000 kWh) will vary according to country, depending on costs in the area, the regulatory regime and consequent financial and other risks, and the availability and cost of finance. Construction costs per kilowatt of generating capacity will also depend on geographic factors such as availability of cooling water, earthquake likelihood, and availability of suitable power grid connections. Therefore, it is not possible to accurately estimate costs on a global basis.

=== Levelized cost of energy estimates ===
In Levelized Cost of Energy (LCOE) estimates and comparisons, a very significant factor is the assumed discount rate which reflects the preference of an investor for short-term value of the funds as opposed to long-term value. As it's not a physical factor, but rather economic, a choice of specific values of discount rate can double or triple the estimated cost of energy merely based on that initial assumption. In case of low-carbon sources of energy, such as nuclear power, experts highlight that the discount rate should be set low (1-3%) as the value of low-carbon energy for future generations prevents very high future external costs of climate change.

Numerous LCOE comparisons use high discount rate values (10%) which mostly reflects preference for short-term profit by commercial investors without accounting for the decarbonization contribution. For example, IPCC AR3 WG3 calculation based on 10% discount rate produced LCOE estimate of $97/MWh for nuclear power, while by merely assuming 1.4% discount rate, the estimate drops to $42/MWh which is the same issue that has been raised for other low-carbon energy sources with high initial capital costs.

Other cross-market LCOE estimates are criticized for basing their calculation on undisclosed portfolio of cherry-picked projects that were significantly delayed due to various reasons, but not include projects that were built in time and within the budget. For example, Bloomberg New Energy Finance (BNEF), based on undisclosed portfolio of projects, estimated nuclear power LCOE at €190-375/MWh which is up to 900% higher than the published LCOE of €30/MWh for an actual existing Olkiluoto nuclear power plant, even after accounting for construction delays in OL3 block, although this number is based on an average LCOE with new and old reactors. Based on the published methodology details, it has been pointed out that BNEF assumed cost of capital 230% higher than the actual one (1.56%), fixed operating costs at 300% higher than actual and nameplate power lower (1,400 MW) than actual 1,600 MW, all of which contributed to significant overestimate in price.

In 2019, the US EIA revised the levelized cost of electricity from new advanced nuclear power plants going online in 2023 to be $0.0775/kWh before government subsidies, using a regulated industry 4.3% cost of capital (WACC – pre-tax 6.6%) over a 30-year cost recovery period. Financial firm Lazard also updated its levelized cost of electricity report costing new nuclear at between $0.118/kWh and $0.192/kWh using a commercial 7.7% cost of capital (WACC – pre-tax 12% cost for the higher-risk 40% equity finance and 8% cost for the 60% loan finance) over a 40-year lifetime.

== Costs by region ==
The price of new plants in China is lower than in the Western world.

Current bids for new nuclear power plants in China were estimated at between $2800/kW and $3500/kW, as China planned to accelerate its new build program after a pause following the Fukushima disaster. However, more recent reports indicated that China will fall short of its targets. While nuclear power in China has been cheaper than solar and wind power, these are getting cheaper while nuclear power costs are growing. Moreover, third generation plants are expected to be considerably more expensive than earlier plants.

== Comparisons with other power sources ==
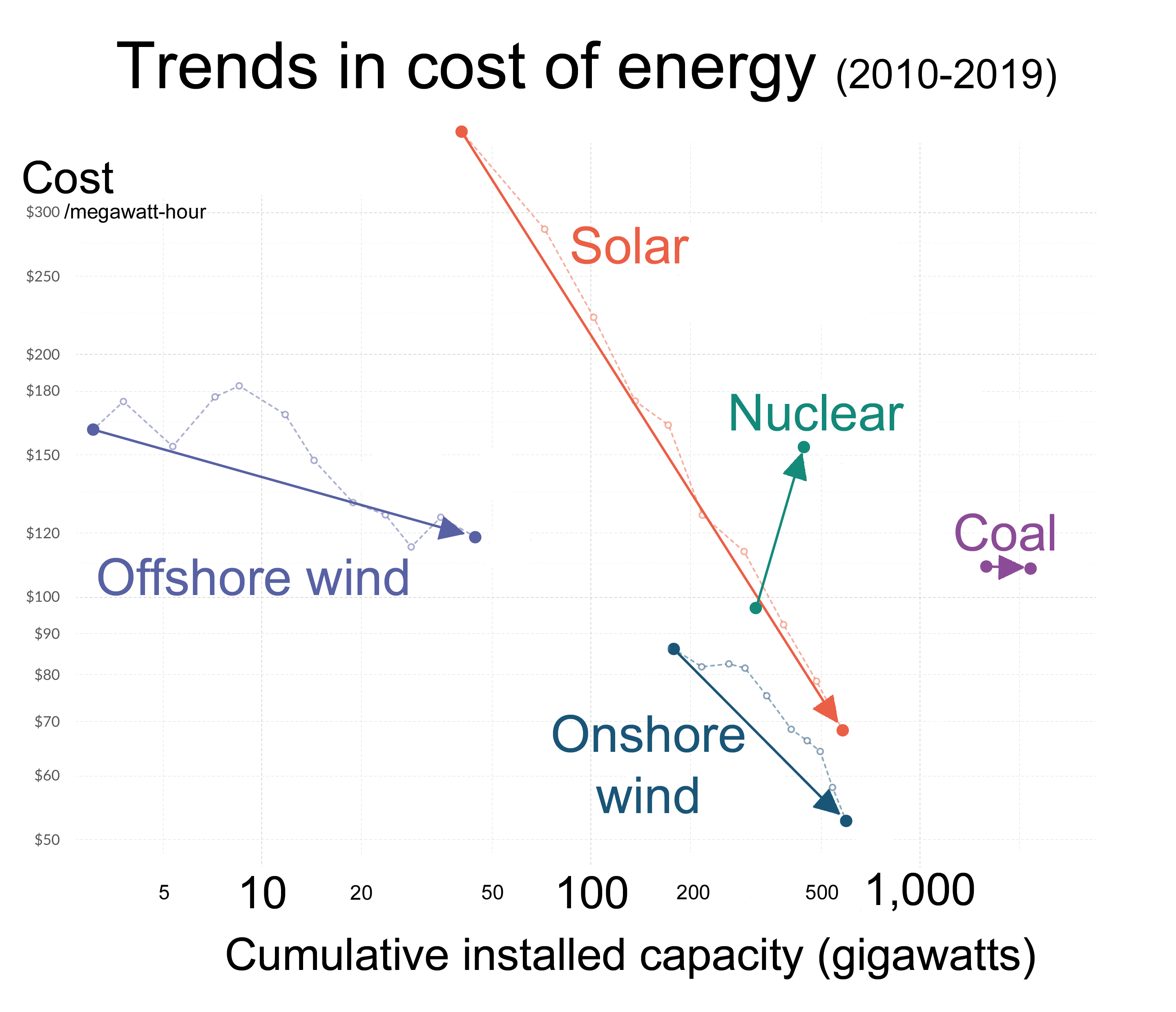
Levelized cost of energy based on different studies. Electricity from renewables became cheaper while electricity from new nuclear plants became more expensive.

Generally, a nuclear power plant is significantly more expensive to build than an equivalent coal-fueled or gas-fueled plant. If natural gas is plentiful and inexpensive, the operating costs of conventional power plants is less. Most forms of electricity generation produce some form of negative externality costs imposed on third parties that are not directly paid by the producer such as pollution which negatively affects the health of those near and downwind of the power plant, and generation costs often do not reflect these external costs.

A comparison of the "real" cost of various energy sources is complicated by a number of uncertainties:

- The increase and decrease of the cost change due to climate change because emissions of greenhouse gases is hard to estimate. Carbon taxes may be enacted, or carbon capture and storage may become mandatory.
- The environmental damage cost increase that is caused by any energy source through land use (whether for mining fuels or for power generation), air and water pollution, solid waste production, manufacturing-related damages (such as from mining and processing ores or rare earth elements), etc.
- The cost and political feasibility of disposal of the waste from reprocessed spent nuclear fuel is still not fully resolved. In the United States, the ultimate disposal costs of spent nuclear fuel are assumed by the U.S. government after producers pay a fixed surcharge.
- Due to the dominant role of initial construction costs and the multi-year construction time, the interest rate for the capital required (as well as the timeline that the plant is completed in) has a major impact on the total cost of building a new nuclear plant.
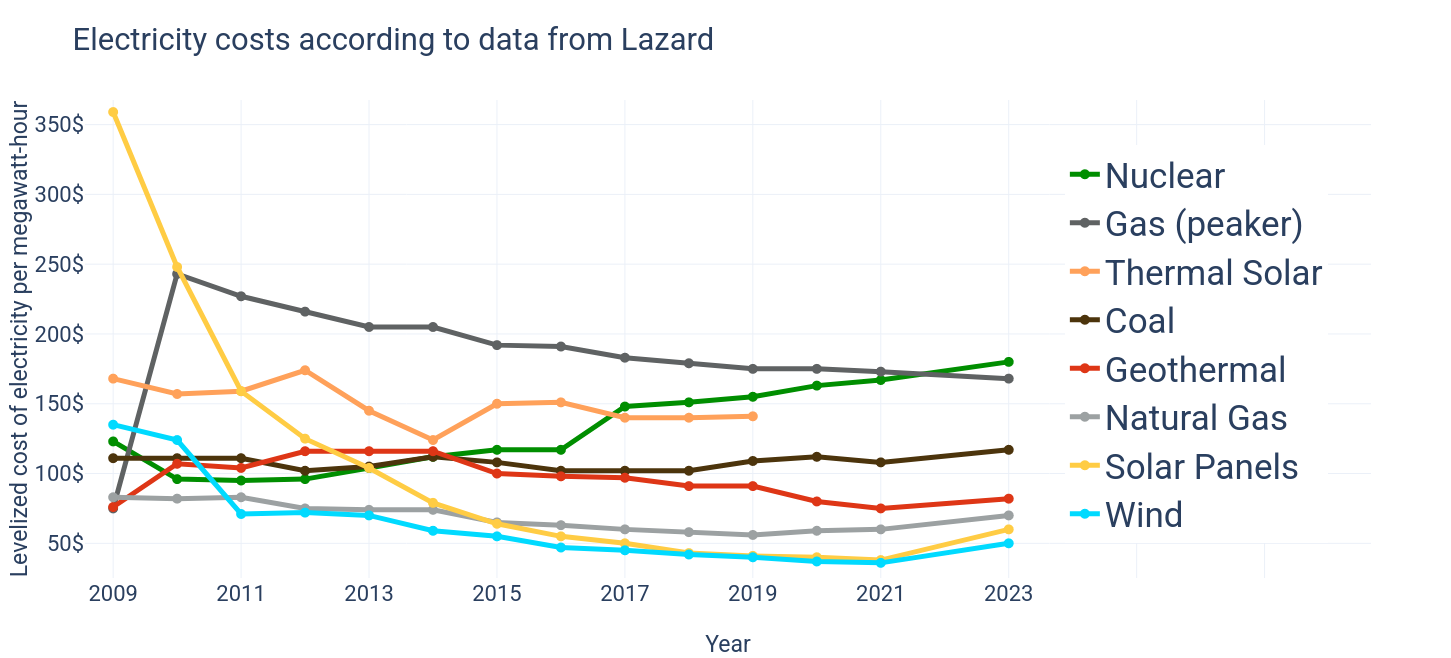
  Levelized electricity costs per type of generation (Lazard 2023)

Lazard's 2023 report on the estimated levelized cost of energy by source (10th edition) estimated unsubsidized prices of $97–$136/MWh for nuclear, $50–$60/MWh for solar PV, $32–$62/MWh for onshore wind, and $82–$155/MWh for offshore wind.

However, the most important subsidies to the nuclear industry do not involve cash payments. Rather, they shift construction costs and operating risks from investors to taxpayers and ratepayers, burdening them with an array of risks including potential cost overruns, defaults to accidents, and nuclear waste management. This approach has remained remarkably consistent throughout the nuclear industry's history, and distorts market choices that would otherwise favor less risky energy investments.

Benjamin K. Sovacool said in 2011 that, "When the full nuclear fuel cycle is considered—not only reactors but also uranium mines and mills, enrichment facilities, spent fuel repositories, and decommissioning sites—nuclear power proves to be one of the costliest sources of energy".

The Brookings Institution published The Net Benefits of Low and No-Carbon Electricity Technologies in 2014 which states, after performing an energy and emissions cost analysis, that "The net benefits of new nuclear, hydro, and natural gas combined cycle plants far outweigh the net benefits of new wind or solar plants", with the most cost effective low carbon power technology being determined to be nuclear power. Moreover, Paul Joskow of MIT maintains that the "Levelized cost of electricity" (LCOE) metric is a poor means of comparing electricity sources as it hides the extra costs, such as the need to frequently operate back up power stations, incurred due to the use of intermittent power sources such as wind energy, while the value of baseload power sources are underrepresented.

Kristin Shrader-Frechette analysed 30 papers on the economics of nuclear power for possible conflicts of interest. She found that out of the 30, 18 had been funded either by the nuclear industry or pro-nuclear governments and were pro-nuclear, 11 were funded by universities or non-profit non-government organisations and were anti-nuclear, the remaining 1 had unknown sponsors and took the pro-nuclear stance. The pro-nuclear studies were accused of using cost-trimming methods such as ignoring government subsidies and using industry projections above empirical evidence where ever possible. The situation was compared to medical research where 98% of industry sponsored studies return positive results.

According to the World Nuclear Association, as of March 2020:

- Nuclear power is cost competitive with other forms of electricity generation, except where there is direct access to low-cost fossil fuels.
- Fuel costs for nuclear plants are a minor proportion of total generating costs, though capital costs are greater than those for coal-fired plants and much greater than those for gas-fired plants.
- System costs for nuclear power (as well as coal and gas-fired generation) are very much lower than for intermittent renewables.
- Providing incentives for long-term, high-capital investment in deregulated markets driven by short-term price signals presents a challenge in securing a diversified and reliable electricity supply system.
- In assessing the economics of nuclear power, decommissioning and waste disposal costs are fully taken into account.
- Nuclear power plant construction is typical of large infrastructure projects around the world, whose costs and delivery challenges tend to be under-estimated.

== Other economic issues ==
Nuclear power plants tend to be competitive in areas where other fuel resources are not readily available—France, most notably, has almost no native supplies of fossil fuels. France's nuclear power experience has also been one of paradoxically increasing rather than decreasing costs over time.

Making a massive investment of capital in a project with long-term recovery can affect a company's credit rating.

A Council on Foreign Relations report on nuclear energy argues that a rapid expansion of nuclear power may create shortages in building materials such as reactor-quality concrete and steel, skilled workers and engineers, and safety controls by skilled inspectors. This would drive up current prices.

Old nuclear plants generally had a somewhat limited ability to significantly vary their output in order to match changing demand (a practice called load following). However, many BWRs, some PWRs (mainly in France), and certain CANDU reactors (primarily those at Bruce Nuclear Generating Station) have various levels of load-following capabilities (sometimes substantial), which allow them to fill more than just baseline generation needs. Several newer reactor designs also offer some form of enhanced load-following capability. For example, the Areva EPR can slew its electrical output power between 990 and 1,650 MW at 82.5 MW per minute.

The number of companies that manufacture certain parts for nuclear reactors is limited, particularly the large forgings used for reactor vessels and steam systems. In 2010, only four companies (Japan Steel Works, China First Heavy Industries, Russia's OMZ Izhora and Korea's Doosan Heavy Industries) manufacture pressure vessels for reactors of 1100 MW_{e} or larger. It was suggested that this poses a bottleneck that could hamper expansion of nuclear power internationally, however, some Western reactor designs require no steel pressure vessel such as CANDU derived reactors which rely on individual pressurized fuel channels. The large forgings for steam generators—although still very heavy—can be produced by a far larger number of suppliers.

For a country with both a nuclear power industry and a nuclear arms industry, synergies between the two can favor a nuclear power plant with an otherwise uncertain economy. For example, in the United Kingdom researchers have informed MPs that the government was using the Hinkley Point C project to cross-subsidise the UK military's nuclear-related activity by maintaining nuclear skills. In support of that, researchers from the University of Sussex Andy Stirling and Phil Johnstone stated that the costs of the Trident nuclear submarine programme would be prohibitive without "an effective subsidy from electricity consumers to military nuclear infrastructure".

The hope for Economies of scale was one of the reasons of the development of "standard reactor designs" like the German "Konvoi" (only three such plants were ever actually built and they differ substantially from one another due to German federalism) or its successor, the French–German EPR (nuclear power plant).

== Nuclear renaissance ==
The nuclear power industry in Western nations has had a history of construction delays, cost overruns, plant cancellations, and nuclear safety issues despite significant government subsidies and support.

Following the Fukushima nuclear disaster in 2011, costs are likely to go up for currently operating and new nuclear power plants, due to increased requirements for on-site spent fuel management and elevated design basis threats. After Fukushima, the International Energy Agency halved its estimate of additional nuclear generating capacity built by 2035.

As of 2020, some companies and organizations have sought to develop proposals and projects aimed at reducing the traditional costs of nuclear power plant construction, often using small modular reactor designs rather than conventional reactors. For example, TerraPower, a company based in Bellevue, Washington and co-founded by Bill Gates, aims to build a sodium fast reactor for $1 billion with a proposed site in Kemmerer, Wyoming. Reactor construction began in April 2026. Furthermore, in January 2026, Meta announced an agreement to fund two sodium reactors to be built by 2032, and for TerraPower to give Meta the rights to electricity produced by up to six more reactors planned to enter operation by 2035.

Oklo Inc., a Silicon Valley–based startup, is building a micro modular reactor that runs off of radioactive waste produced by conventional nuclear power plants. at the Idaho National Laboratory. Like OPEN100, Oklo aims to reduce costs partially by standardizing the construction of its plants. Other entities developing similar plans include: X-energy, NuScale Power, General Atomics, and others.

== See also ==
- Cost of electricity by source – Comparison of costs of different electricity generation sources
- Generation IV reactor – New nuclear reactor technologies under development
- Light Water Reactor Sustainability Program – U.S. government research and development program
- List of books about nuclear issues
- List of nuclear reactors
- Lists of nuclear disasters and radioactive incidents
- Nuclear decommissioning – Process of dismantling a nuclear facility
- Nuclear power debate – Controversy over the use of nuclear power
- Renewable energy commercialization – Deployment of technologies harnessing easily replenished natural resources
- World Nuclear Industry Status Report
