= NFPA 805 =

NFPA 805: Performance-Based Standard for Fire Protection for Light Water Reactor Electric Generating Plants is a safety standard introduced in 2001 by the National Fire Protection Association to provide a performance based standard for fire protection in light water nuclear reactor plants.

There are currently five editions with a sixth planned for release in 2025. The editions are as follows: 2001, 2006, 2010, 2015, 2020 (current) and 2025 (future).

NFPA 805, 2001 edition, meets the Alternate Fire protection rule from the U.S. Nuclear Regulatory Commission 10 CFR 50.48(c).
