= Matched index of refraction flow facility =

Facility of the Idaho National Laboratory

Matched Index of Refraction (or MIR) is a facility located at the Idaho National Laboratory built in the 1990s. The purpose of the fluid dynamics experiments in the MIR flow system at Idaho National Laboratory (INL) is to develop benchmark databases for the assessment of Computational Fluid Dynamics (CFD) solutions of the momentum equations, scalar mixing, and turbulence models for the flow ratios between coolant channels and bypass gaps in the interstitial regions of typical prismatic standard fuel element or upper reflector block geometries of typical Very High Temperature Reactors (VHTR) in the limiting case of negligible buoyancy and constant fluid properties.

== Functionality ==
MIR uses Doppler Velocimetry to produce a three-dimensional image of a model inside the loop. To do this, the loop circulates about 3500 gallons of semi-transparent mineral oil similar to baby oil. Special quartz models, built to scale, are inserted into the loop near the observation equipment. MIR is capable of analyzing a variety of models, including the interior of nuclear reactor cores.

The purpose of MIR is to allow researchers to analyze a model's fluid properties; how its structure interacts with the flow of air, water or another fluid medium through and / or around it. In this way, MIR is somewhat comparable to a wind tunnel. The information MIR can provide is valuable to researchers who want to evaluate a design.

Once the oil is flowing and is held at a defined temperature, the oil takes on the same refractive index as the quartz model. This refractive index matching is a common technique using in liquid flow experiments and allows researchers and instruments to see the flow within facility without distortion at the interface between the models and oil. Researchers can examine flow fields using particle image velocimetry through adding small particles to the oil or just using impurities in the oils.

== Current Experiments Involving MIR ==
The MIR VHTR Bypass Flow Experiment will measure flow characteristics in the coolant channels and interstitial gaps between typical prismatic block standard fuel elements or upper reflector blocks. The experiments use optical techniques, primarily particle image velocimetry (PIV) in the INL MIR flow system. The benefit of the MIR technique is that it permits optical measurements to determine flow characteristics in passages and around objects to be obtained without locating a disturbing transducer in the flow field and without distortion of the optical paths. Unheated MIR experiments are first steps when the geometry is complicated.

== Planned Upgrades ==
3-D Laser Doppler Velocimetry System

- Present system is 2-D
- High-speed/High-resolution 3-D Particle Image Velocimetry system
- Up to 1 kHz frame rate (present system is capable 2–3 Hz standard or 15 Hz up to limit of RAM)
- 4.2 MP resolution (present system is 1.92 MP resolution)
- Planar laser induced fluorescence (PILF) system

== Contributors ==
- Ref: Becker, S., Stoots, C.M., Condie, K.G., Durst, F. and McEligot, D.M., 2002, "LDA-Measurements of Transitional Flows Induced by a Square Rib," J. Fluids Eng., 124, March 2002, pp. 108–117.
- Ref: Condie, K.G., McCreery, G.E. and McEligot, 2001, "Measurements of Fundamental Fluid Physics of SNF Storage Canisters," INEEL/EXT-01-01269, September 2001.
- Ref: McEligot, D.M., McCreery, G.E., Pink, R.J, Barringer, C. and Knight, K.J., 2001, "Physical and Computational Modeling for Chemical and Biological Weapons Airflow Applications," INEEL/CON-02-00860, November 2001.
- Ref: McEligot, D.M., Condie, K.G., Foust, T.D., Jackson, J.D., Kunugi, T., McCreery, G.E., Pink, R.J., Pletcher, R.H., Satake, S.I., Shenoy, A., Stacey, D.E.,
  Vukoslavcevic, P. and Wallace, J.M., 2002, Fundamental Thermal Fluid Physics of High Temperature Flows in Advanced Reactor Systems," INEEL-EXT-2002-1613, December 2002.
- Ref: McEligot, D.M., Condie, K.G., McCreery, G.E., Hochreiter, L.E., Jackson, J.D., Pletcher, R.H., Wallace, J.M., Yoo, J.Y., Ro, S.T., Lee, J.WS. and Park, S.O., 2003, "Advanced Computational Thermal Fluid Physics (CTFP) and its Assessment for Light Water Reactors and Supercritical Reactors," INEEL-EXT03-01215 Rev 5, December 2003.
- Ref: McIlroy, H. M. Jr., 2004, "The Boundary Layer Over Turbine Blade Models with Realistic Rough Surfaces," PhD Dissertation, University of Idaho, December 2004.
- Ref: Shuster, J.M., Pink, R.J., McEligot, D.M. and Smith, D.R., 2005, "Interaction of a Circular Synthetic Jet with a Cross-Flow Boundary Layer," 35th AIAA paper 2005–4749, Fluid Dynamics Conference and Exhibit, 6–9 June 2005, Toronto, CA.
- Ref: McIlroy, H. M. Jr., McEligot, D. M., and Pink, R. J., "Measurement of Flow Phenomena in a Lower Plenum Model of a Prismatic Gas-Cooled Reactor," J. of Eng. for Gas Turbines & Power, 132, Feb. 2010, pp. 022901–1 – 022901–7.
- Ref: Wilson, B.M., Smith, B.L., Spall, R. and McIlroy, H.M. Jr., 2009, "A Non-Symmetrical Swirling Jet as an Example of a highly Model-able Assessment Experiment," ICONE17-75362, Proceedings of ICONE17 2009, 17th International Conference on Nuclear Engineering
