= Light Water Reactor Sustainability Program =

U.S. government research and development program

The Light Water Reactor Sustainability Program is a U.S. government research and development program. It is directed by the United States Department of Energy and is aimed at performing research and compiling data necessary to qualify for licenses to extend the life of America's current 104 electricity generating nuclear power plants beyond 60 years of life. Practically all of the commercial electric-generating nuclear power plants currently in the United States are light water reactor (LWR) plants, meaning they use ordinary (light) water as a moderator and coolant simultaneously.

The basis for the project is founded on the facts that in the near future:

- demand for electricity is projected to increase significantly
- The U.S. has goals to significantly lower carbon dioxide emissions

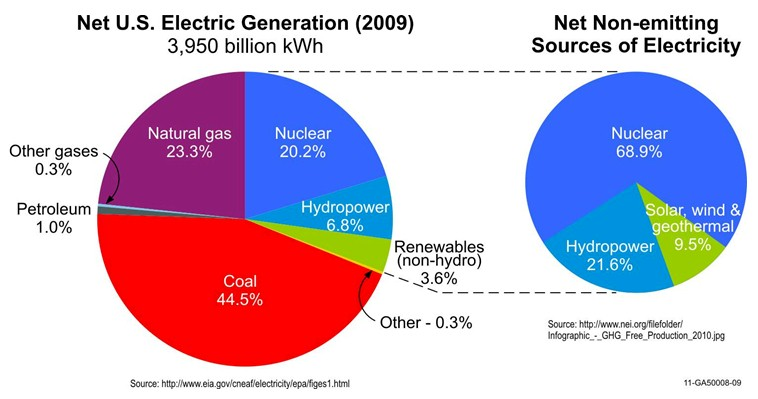
Nuclear power was the largest contributor of non-greenhouse-gas-emitting electric power generation in the United States in 2009, comprising nearly three-quarters of the non-emitting sources. Energy efficiency, renewable energy, and carbon capture and storage technologies are expected to play increasing roles in providing clean and reliable energy.

During his presidential campaign, Barack Obama stated, "Nuclear power represents more than 70% of our noncarbon generated electricity. It is unlikely that we can meet our aggressive climate goals if we eliminate nuclear power as an option." The LWRS Program operates on the premise that electricity from nuclear generating stations, as a zero-carbon source, can and must play a critical role as part of an overall solution to both of these needs. The LWRS Program focuses on four main areas: Materials Aging and Degradation, Advanced Instrumentation, Information, and Control Systems Technologies, Advanced Light Water Reactor Nuclear Fuels, and finally, Risk-Informed Safety Margin Characterization.

== Projected Increase in Demand ==
Domestic demand for electric energy is expected to grow by more than 30% from 2009 to 2035. At the same time, most of the currently operating nuclear power plants will begin reaching the end of their initial 20-year extension to their original 40-year operating license, for a total of 60 years of operation. According to one study, demand will increase by 30-40% by the year 2030. Other studies suggest an even higher increase in the world in general: above 80% by 2035.

== Goals to lower carbon dioxide emissions ==
President Obama made clear the U.S.'s national stance on carbon dioxide emissions on the White House's website which stated, "We must take immediate action to reduce the carbon pollution that threatens our climate and sustains our dependence on fossil fuels." The President has set a goal of reducing greenhouse gas emissions to 80% below 1990 levels by the year 2050.

== Where it is happening ==
Idaho National Laboratory (INL) near Idaho Falls, Idaho and the Oak Ridge National Laboratory (ORNL) are the primary research facilities involved. Other labs and universities across the country are involved in specific parts of the research (see below).

== Who is involved ==
=== Program Management ===
- Trevor Cook, LWRS Program Federal Project Director
- Bruce P. Hallbert, Director, LWRS Program Technical Integration Office
- Donald L. Williams, Jr., Deputy Director, LWRS Program Technical Integration Office
- Cathy J. Barnard, Operations Manager, LWRS Program Technical Integration Office
- Keith J. Leonard, Pathway Lead, Materials Aging and Degradation
- Bruce P. Hallbert, Pathway Lead, Advanced Instrumentation, Information, and Control Systems Technologies
- Curtis L. Smith, Risk-Informed Safety Margin Characterization
- Mitchell T. Farmer, Reactor Safety Technologies

=== Government ===
- U.S. Department of Energy Office of Nuclear Energy
- U.S. Nuclear Regulatory Commission

National Laboratories

- Idaho National Laboratory (INL)
- Oak Ridge National Laboratory (ORNL)
- Pacific Northwest National Laboratory (PNNL)
- Sandia National Laboratories (SNL)

=== Related Department of Energy Research and Development Programs ===
- Advanced Test Reactor (ATR) National Scientific User Facility
- Center for Advanced Energy Studies (CAES)
- Consortium for Advanced Simulation of LWRs (CASL)

=== Industry ===
- EPRI (Electric Power Research Institute)

=== Universities ===
- California State University, San Bernardino
- Colorado School of Mines
- Georgia Tech
- Mississippi State University
- Missouri State University
- Massachusetts Institute of Technology
- Ohio State University
- Oregon State University
- Texas A&M University
- University of California at Berkeley
- University of California Santa Barbara
- University of Michigan
- University of Wisconsin, Madison

=== International ===
- European Nuclear Plant Life Prediction
- Organisation for Economic Co-operation and Development (Halden Reactor Project)
- International Atomic Energy Agency Plant Life Management
- International Forum for Reactor Aging Management
- Materials Ageing Institute
- Nuclear Energy Agency Committee on the Safety of Nuclear Installation
- Organisation for Economic Co-operation and Development
- U.S.-Argentina Binational Energy Working Group

== Primary Technical Areas of Research and Development ==
=== Materials Aging and Degradation ===
The Materials Aging and Degradation Pathway conducts research to develop the scientific basis for understanding and predicting long-term environmental degradation behavior of materials in nuclear power plants. Provide data and methods to assess performance of systems, structures, and components essential to safe and sustained nuclear power plant operation, providing key input to both regulators and industry.

=== Background ===
Nuclear reactors present a very challenging service environment. Components within the containment of an operating reactor must tolerate high-temperature water, stress, vibration, and an intense neutron field. Degradation of materials in this environment can lead to reduced performance and, in some cases, sudden failure.

Clearly, the demanding environments of an operating nuclear reactor may impact the ability of a broad range of materials to perform their intended function over extended service periods. Routine surveillance and repair/replacement activities can mitigate the impact of this degradation; however, failures still occur.

While all components potentially can be replaced, decisions to simply replace components may not be practical or the most economically favorable option. Therefore, understanding, controlling, and mitigating materials degradation processes and establishing a sound technical basis for long-range planning of necessary replacements are key priorities for extended nuclear power plants operations and power uprate considerations.

=== Purpose and Goals ===
The Materials Aging and Degradation Pathway provides research in many areas of materials science and technology, all supporting multiple Department of Energy missions and providing unique input to the evaluation of nuclear power plant life extension while complementing research and development efforts of the nuclear industry and regulators. The strategic goals of the pathway are to develop the scientific basis for understanding and predicting long-term environmental degradation behavior of materials in nuclear power plants and to provide data and methods to assess performance of systems, structures, and components essential to safe and sustained nuclear power plant operations.

The Department of Energy (through the Materials Aging and Degradation Pathway) is involved in this research and development activity to provide improved mechanistic understanding of key degradation modes and sufficient experimental data to provide and validate operational limits; provide new methods of monitoring degradation; and develop advanced mitigation techniques to provide improved performance, reliability, and economics.

=== Advanced Instrumentation, Information, and Control Systems Technologies ===
The Advanced Instrumentation, Information, and Control Systems Technologies Pathway conducts research to develop, demonstrate, and deploy new digital technologies for instrumentation and control architectures and provide monitoring capabilities to ensure the continued safe, reliable, and economic operation of the nation's operating nuclear power plants.

==== Background ====
Reliable instrumentation, information, and control systems technologies are essential to ensuring safe and efficient operation of the U.S. LWR fleet. These technologies affect every aspect of nuclear power plant and balance-of-plant operations. Current instrumentation and human-machine interfaces employ analog systems in the nuclear power sector. These systems, though generally considered by other industries to be obsolete, continue to function reliably, but do not enable utilities to take full advantage of digital technologies to achieve performance gains. Beyond control systems, new technologies are needed to monitor and characterize the effects of aging and degradation in critical areas of key systems, structures, and components. The objective of these efforts is to develop, demonstrate, and deploy new digital technologies for instrumentation information and control architectures and provide monitoring capabilities to ensure the continued safe, reliable, and economic operation of the nation's 104 nuclear power plants.

==== Purpose and Goals ====
The purpose of the Advanced Instrumentation, Information, and Control Systems Technologies Pathway is to enable the modernization of the legacy instrumentation information and control systems in a manner that creates a digital environment encompassing all aspects of plant operations and support, building a three-dimensional information architecture that integrates plant systems, plant processes, and plant workers in an array of technologies.

=== Risk-Informed Safety Margin Characterization ===
The Risk-Informed Safety Margin Characterization Pathway conducts research to develop and deploy approaches to support the management of uncertainty in safety margins quantification to improve decision making for nuclear power plants. This pathway will (1) develop and demonstrate a risk-assessment method tied to safety margins quantification and (2) create advanced tools for safety assessment that enable more accurate representation of a nuclear power plant safety margin.

==== Background ====
Safety is central to the design, licensing, operation, and economics of nuclear power plants. As the current LWR nuclear power plants age beyond 60 years, there are possibilities for increased frequency of system, structures, and components failures that initiate safety-significant events, reduce existing accident mitigation capabilities, or create new failure modes. Plant designers commonly "over-design" portions of nuclear power plants and provide robustness in the form of redundant and diverse engineered safety features to ensure that, even in the case of well-beyond design basis scenarios, public health and safety will be protected with a very high degree of assurance.

The ability to better characterize and quantify safety margin holds the key to improved decision making about LWR design, operation, and plant life extension. A systematic approach to characterization of safety margins represents a vital input to the licensee and regulatory analysis and decision making that will be involved. In addition, as research and development in the LWRS Program and other collaborative efforts yield new data and improved scientific understanding of physical processes that govern the aging and degradation of plant systems, structures, and components (and concurrently support technological advances in nuclear reactor fuel and plant instrumentation, information, and control systems) needs and opportunities to better optimize plant safety and performance will become known.

==== Purpose ====
The purpose of the Risk-Informed Safety Margin Characterization Pathway is to develop and deploy approaches to support the management of uncertainty in safety margins quantification to improve decision making for nuclear power plants. Management of uncertainty implies the ability to (a) understand and (b) control risks related to safety. Consequently, the RISMC Pathway is dedicated to improving both aspects of safety management.

=== Advanced Light Water Reactor Nuclear Fuels ===
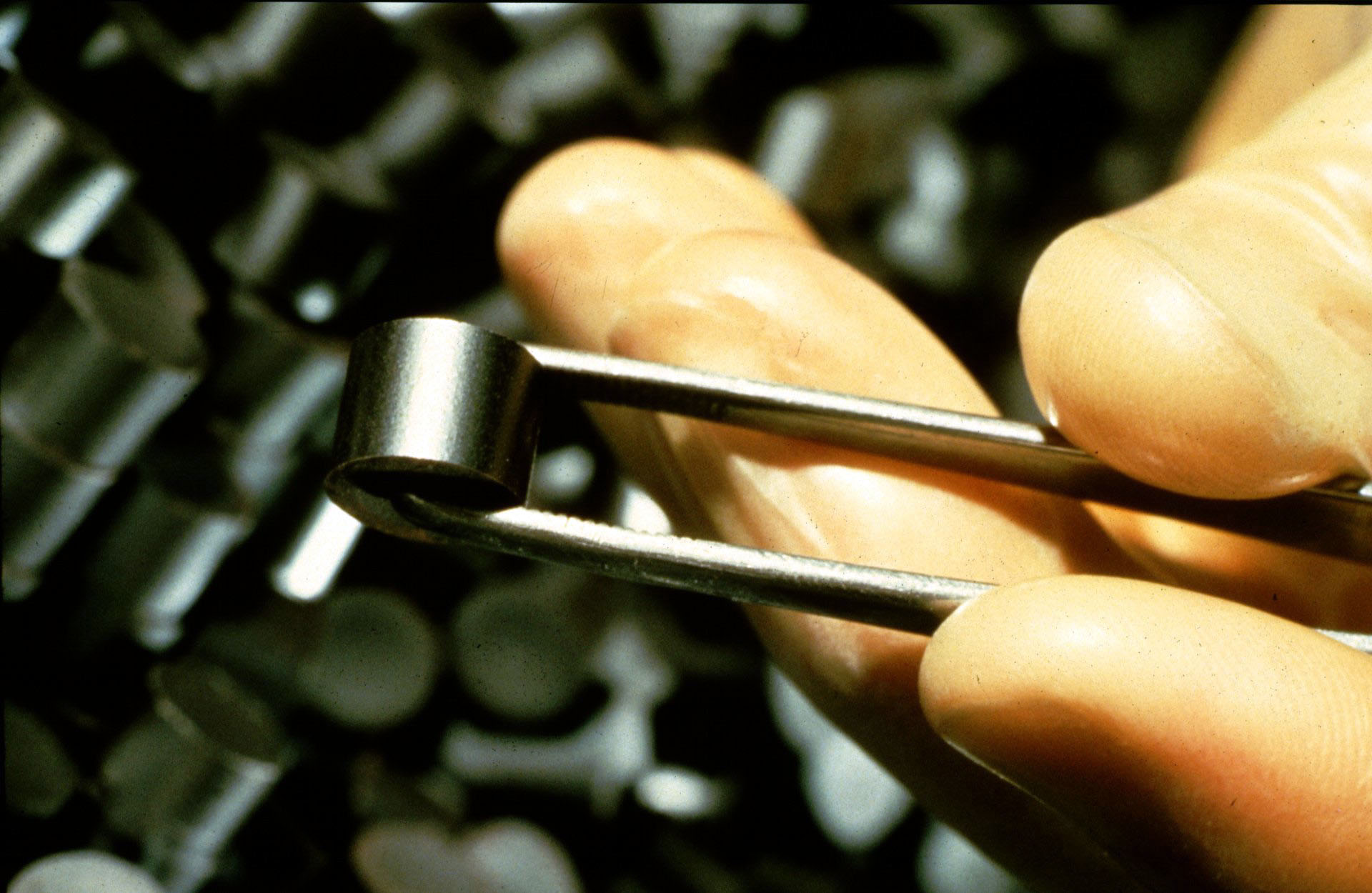
Conventional nuclear fuel pellet

The Advanced Nuclear Fuels Pathway conducts research to improve scientific knowledge basis for understanding and predicting fundamental nuclear fuel and cladding performance in nuclear power plants. Apply this information to development of high-performance, high burn-up fuels with improved safety, cladding integrity, and improved nuclear fuel cycle economics.

==== Background ====
Nuclear fuel performance is a significant driver of nuclear power plant operational performance, safety, operating economics, and waste disposal requirements (Over the past two decades, the nuclear power industry has improved plant capacity factors with incremental improvements achieved in fuel reliability and use or burnup). However, these upgrades are reaching their maximum achievable impact to achieve significant safety margin improvements while improving operating margins and economics, significant steps beyond incremental improvements in the current generation of nuclear fuel are required. Fundamental changes are required in the areas of nuclear fuel composition, cladding integrity, and the fuel/cladding interaction to reach the next levels of fuel performance. The technological improvements being developed in the Advanced LWR Nuclear Fuels Pathway center on development of revolutionary cladding materials supported by enhanced fuel mechanical designs and alternate fuel compositions. If realized, the changes would have substantial beneficial improvements in nuclear power plant economics, operation, and safety.

==== Purpose and Goals ====
The Advanced LWR Nuclear Fuels Pathway performs research on improving reactor safety, increasing fuel economics, producing advanced cladding designs, and developing enhanced computational models to predict fuel performance. Strategic research and development goals are directed at improving the scientific knowledge basis for understanding and predicting fundamental nuclear fuel and cladding performance in nuclear power plants, and applying the information to development of high-performance, high-burnup fuels with improved safety, cladding, integrity, and nuclear fuel cycle economics. This research is further designed to demonstrate each of the technology advancements while satisfying all safety and regulatory limits through rigorous testing and analysis.

== See also ==
- Economics of new nuclear power plants
- Idaho National Laboratory
- Light water reactor
