= Light-water reactor =

Type of nuclear reactor that uses normal water

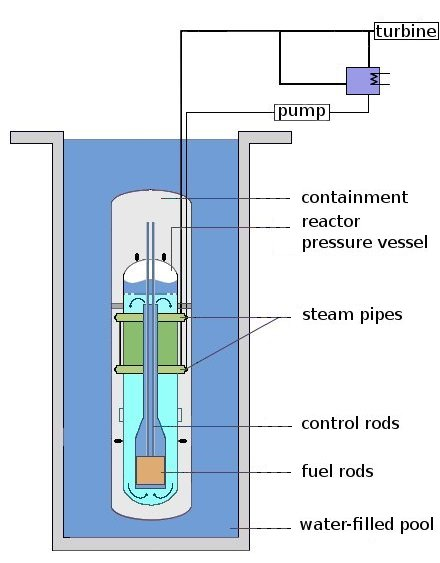
A simple pumpless light-water reactor

The light-water reactor (LWR) is a type of thermal-neutron reactor that uses normal water, as opposed to heavy water, as both its coolant and neutron moderator; furthermore a solid form of fissile elements is used as fuel. Thermal-neutron reactors are the most common type of nuclear reactor, and light-water reactors are the most common type of thermal-neutron reactor.

There are three varieties of light-water reactors: the pressurized water reactor (PWR), the boiling water reactor (BWR), and (most designs of) the supercritical water reactor (SCWR).

== History ==
=== Early concepts and experiments ===
After the discoveries of fission, moderation and of the theoretical possibility of a nuclear chain reaction, early experimental results rapidly showed that natural uranium could only undergo a sustained chain reaction using graphite or heavy water as a moderator. While the world's first reactors (CP-1, X10 etc.) were successfully reaching criticality, uranium enrichment began to develop from theoretical concept to practical applications in order to meet the goal of the Manhattan Project, to build a nuclear explosive.

In May 1944, the first grams of enriched uranium ever produced reached criticality in the low power (LOPO) reactor at Los Alamos, which was used to estimate the critical mass of U235 to produce the atomic bomb. LOPO cannot be considered as the first light-water reactor because its fuel was not a solid uranium compound cladded with corrosion-resistant material, but was composed of uranyl sulfate salt dissolved in water. It is however the first aqueous homogeneous reactor and the first reactor using enriched uranium as fuel and ordinary water as a moderator.

By the end of the war, following an idea of Alvin Weinberg, natural uranium fuel elements were arranged in a lattice in ordinary water at the top of the X10 reactor to evaluate the neutron multiplication factor. The purpose of this experiment was to determine the feasibility of a nuclear reactor using light water as a moderator and coolant, and clad solid uranium as fuel. The results showed that, with a lightly enriched uranium, criticality could be reached. This experiment was the first practical step toward the light-water reactor.

After World War II and with the availability of enriched uranium, new reactor concepts became feasible. In 1946, Eugene Wigner and Alvin Weinberg proposed and developed the concept of a reactor using enriched uranium as a fuel, and light water as a moderator and coolant. This concept was proposed for a reactor whose purpose was to test the behavior of materials under neutron flux. This reactor, the Material Testing Reactor (MTR), was built in Idaho at INL and reached criticality on March 31, 1952. For the design of this reactor, experiments were necessary, so a mock-up of the MTR was built at ORNL, to assess the hydraulic performances of the primary circuit and then to test its neutronic characteristics. This MTR mock-up, later called the Low Intensity Test Reactor (LITR), reached criticality on February 4, 1950 and was the world's first light-water reactor.

=== Pressurized water reactors ===
Immediately after the end of World War II the United States Navy started a program under the direction of Captain (later Admiral) Hyman Rickover, with the goal of nuclear propulsion for ships. It developed the first pressurized water reactors in the early 1950s, and led to the successful deployment of the first nuclear submarine, the USS Nautilus (SSN-571).

The Soviet Union independently developed a version of the PWR in the late 1950s, under the name of VVER. While functionally very similar to the American effort, it also has certain design distinctions from Western PWRs.

=== Boiling water reactor ===
Researcher Samuel Untermyer II led the effort to develop the BWR at the US National Reactor Testing Station (now the Idaho National Laboratory) in a series of tests called the BORAX experiments.

=== PIUS reactor ===
PIUS, standing for Process Inherent Ultimate Safety, was a Swedish design designed by ASEA-ATOM. It is a concept for a light-water reactor system. Along with the SECURE reactor, it relied on passive measures, not requiring operator actions or external energy supplies, to provide safe operation. No units were ever built.

=== OPEN100 ===
In 2020, the Energy Impact Center announced publication of an open-sourced engineering design of a pressurized water reactor capable of producing 300 MWth/100 MWe of energy called OPEN100.

== Overview ==
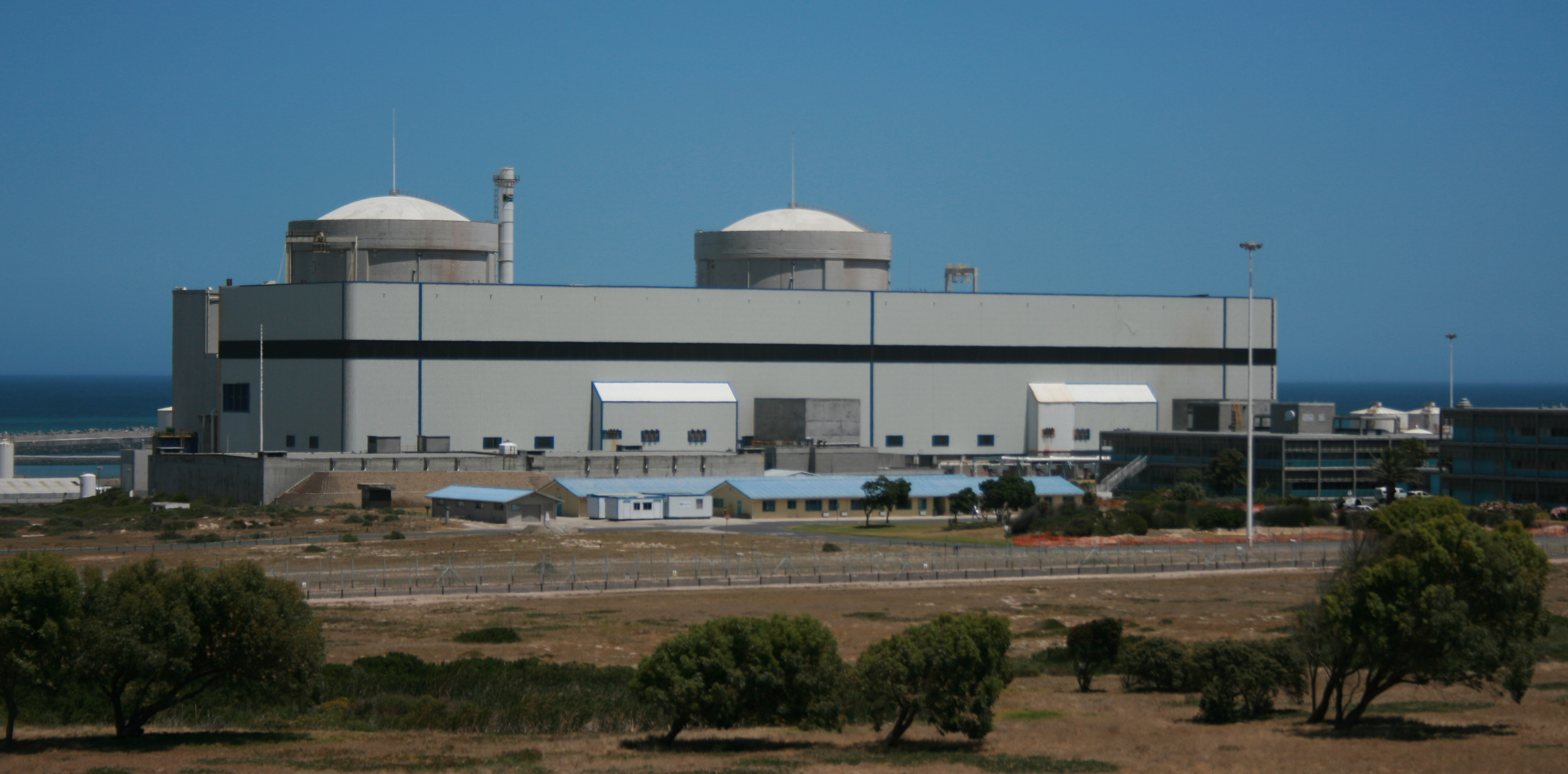
The Koeberg nuclear power station, consisting of two pressurized water reactors fueled with uranium

The family of nuclear reactors known as light-water reactors (LWR), cooled and moderated using ordinary water, tend to be simpler and cheaper to build than other types of nuclear reactors; due to these factors, they make up the vast majority of civil nuclear reactors and naval propulsion reactors in service throughout the world as of 2009. LWRs can be subdivided into three categories – pressurized water reactors (PWRs), boiling water reactors (BWRs), and supercritical water reactors (SCWRs). The SCWR remains hypothetical as of 2009; it is a Generation IV design that is still a light-water reactor, but it is only partially moderated by light water and exhibits certain characteristics of a fast neutron reactor.

The leaders in national experience with PWRs, offering reactors for export, are the United States (which offers the passively safe AP1000, a Westinghouse design, as well as several smaller, modular, passively safe PWRs, such as the Babcock & Wilcox MPower, and the NuScale MASLWR), the Russian Federation (offering both the VVER-1000 and the VVER-1200 for export), the Republic of France (offering the AREVA EPR for export), and Japan (offering the Mitsubishi Advanced Pressurized Water Reactor for export); in addition, both the People's Republic of China and the Republic of Korea are both noted to be rapidly ascending into the front rank of PWR-constructing nations as well, with the Chinese being engaged in a massive program of nuclear power expansion, and the Koreans currently designing and constructing their second generation of indigenous designs. The leaders in national experience with BWRs, offering reactors for export, are the United States and Japan, with the alliance of General Electric (of the US) and Hitachi (of Japan), offering both the Advanced Boiling Water Reactor (ABWR) and the Economic Simplified Boiling Water Reactor (ESBWR) for construction and export; in addition, Toshiba offers an ABWR variant for construction in Japan, as well. West Germany was also once a major player with BWRs. The other types of nuclear reactor in use for power generation are the heavy water moderated reactor, built by Canada (CANDU) and the Republic of India (AHWR), the advanced gas cooled reactor (AGCR), built by the United Kingdom, the liquid metal cooled reactor (LMFBR), built by the Russian Federation, the Republic of France, and Japan, and the graphite-moderated, water-cooled reactor (RBMK or LWGR), found exclusively within the Russian Federation and former Soviet states.

Though electricity generation capabilities are comparable between all these types of reactor, due to the aforementioned features, and the extensive experience with operations of the LWR, it is favored in the vast majority of new nuclear power plants. In addition, light-water reactors make up the vast majority of reactors that power naval nuclear-powered vessels. Four out of the five great powers with nuclear naval propulsion capacity use light-water reactors exclusively: the British Royal Navy, the Chinese People's Liberation Army Navy, the French Marine nationale, and the United States Navy. Only the Russian Federation's Navy has used a relative handful of liquid-metal cooled reactors in production vessels, specifically the Alfa class submarine, which used lead-bismuth eutectic as a reactor moderator and coolant, but the vast majority of Russian nuclear-powered boats and ships use light-water reactors exclusively. The reason for near exclusive LWR use aboard nuclear naval vessels is the level of inherent safety built into these types of reactors. Since light water is used as both a coolant and a neutron moderator in these reactors, if one of these reactors suffers damage due to military action, leading to a compromise of the reactor core's integrity, the resulting release of the light-water moderator will act to stop the nuclear reaction and shut the reactor down. This capability is known as a negative void coefficient of reactivity.

Currently offered LWRs include the following:

- ABWR
- AP1000
- APR-1400
- CPR-1000
- EPR
- VVER

=== LWR statistics ===
As of 2022, 379 out of 441 power reactors worldwide were light water reactors and 45 out of 51 under construction were of the light water reactor design. 306 reactors were Pressurized Light-Water Moderated and Cooled Reactors, 61 were Boiling Light-Water Cooled and Moderated Reactors, and 12 were Light-Water Cooled, Graphite Moderated Reactors. Their total combined net electrical capacity was 361,888 MW.

== Reactor design ==
The light-water reactor produces heat by controlled nuclear fission. The nuclear reactor core is the portion of a nuclear reactor where the nuclear reactions take place. It mainly consists of nuclear fuel and control elements. The pencil-thin nuclear fuel rods, each about 12 feet (3.7 m) long, are grouped by the hundreds in bundles called fuel assemblies. Inside each fuel rod, pellets of uranium, or more commonly uranium oxide, are stacked end to end. The control elements, called control rods, are filled with pellets of substances like hafnium or cadmium that readily capture neutrons. When the control rods are lowered into the core, they absorb neutrons, which thus cannot take part in the chain reaction. On the converse, when the control rods are lifted out of the way, more neutrons strike the fissile uranium-235 or plutonium-239 nuclei in nearby fuel rods, and the chain reaction intensifies. All of this is enclosed in a water-filled steel pressure vessel, called the reactor vessel.

In the boiling water reactor, the heat generated by fission turns the water into steam, which directly drives the power-generating turbines. But in the pressurized water reactor, the heat generated by fission is transferred to a secondary loop via a heat exchanger. Steam is produced in the secondary loop, and the secondary loop drives the power-generating turbines. In either case, after flowing through the turbines, the steam turns back into water in the condenser.

Animated diagram of a boiling water reactor

Animated diagram of a pressurized water reactor

The water required to cool the condenser is taken from a nearby river or ocean. It is then pumped back into the river or ocean, in warmed condition. The heat can also be dissipated via a cooling tower into the atmosphere. The United States uses LWR reactors for electric power production, in comparison to the heavy water reactors used in Canada.

=== Control ===
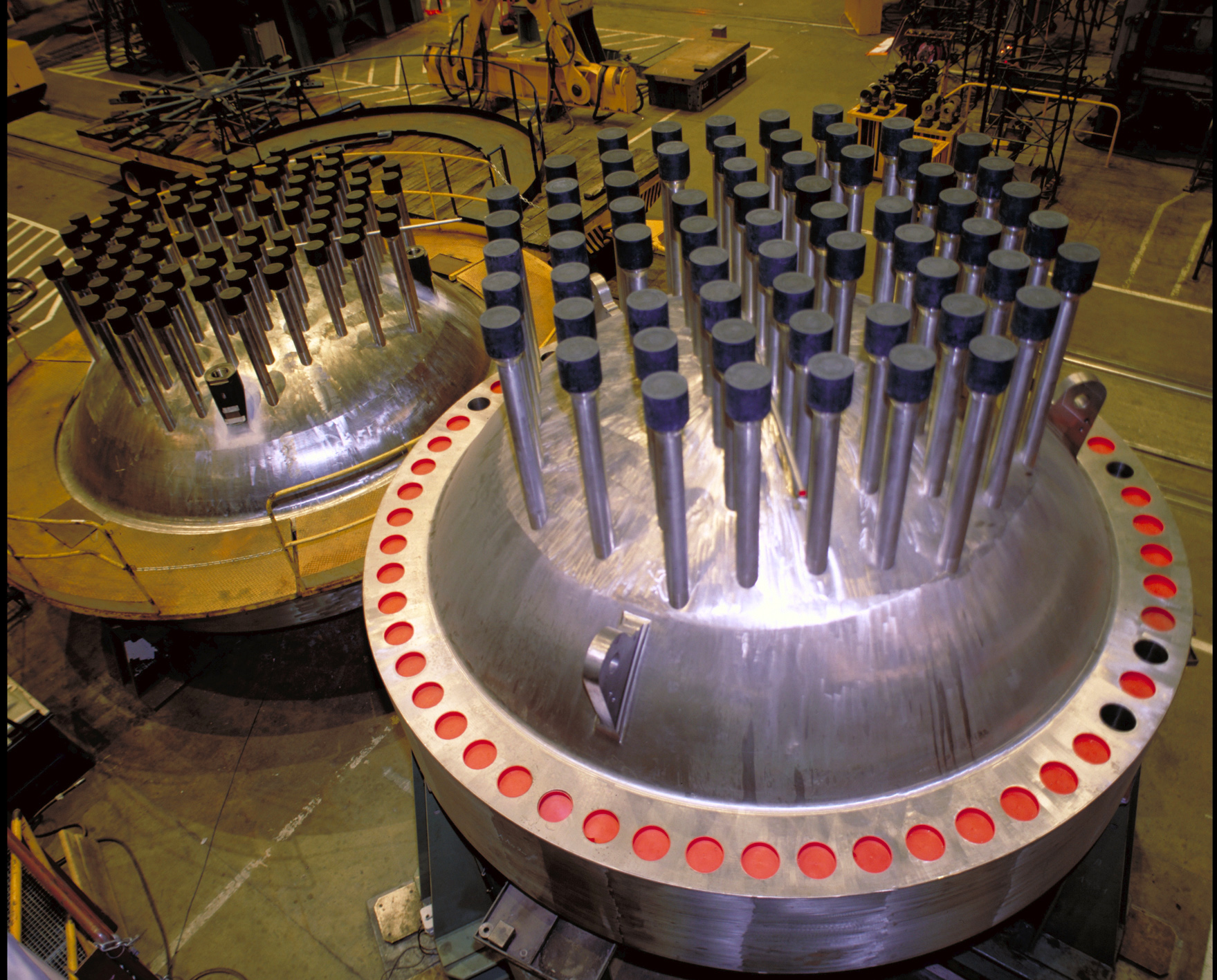
A pressurized water reactor head, with the control rods visible on the top

Control rods are usually combined into control rod assemblies — typically 20 rods for a commercial pressurized water reactor assembly — and inserted into guide tubes within a fuel element. A control rod is removed from or inserted into the central core of a nuclear reactor in order to control the number of neutrons which will split further uranium atoms. This in turn affects the thermal power of the reactor, the amount of steam generated, and hence the electricity produced. The control rods are partially removed from the core to allow a chain reaction to occur. The number of control rods inserted and the distance by which they are inserted can be varied to control the reactivity of the reactor.

Usually there are also other means of controlling reactivity. In the PWR design a soluble neutron absorber, usually boric acid, is added to the reactor coolant allowing the complete extraction of the control rods during stationary power operation ensuring an even power and flux distribution over the entire core. Operators of the BWR design use the coolant flow through the core to control reactivity by varying the speed of the reactor recirculation pumps. An increase in the coolant flow through the core improves the removal of steam bubbles, thus increasing the density of the coolant/moderator with the result of increasing power.

=== Coolant ===
The light-water reactor also uses ordinary water to keep the reactor cooled. The cooling source, light water, is circulated past the reactor core to absorb the heat that it generates. The heat is carried away from the reactor and is then used to generate steam. Most reactor systems employ a cooling system that is physically separate from the water that will be boiled to produce pressurized steam for the turbines, like the pressurized-water reactor. But in some reactors the water for the steam turbines is boiled directly by the reactor core, for example the boiling-water reactor.

Many other reactors are also light-water cooled, notably the RBMK and some military plutonium-production reactors. These are not regarded as LWRs, as they are moderated by graphite, and as a result their nuclear characteristics are very different. Although the coolant flow rate in commercial PWRs is constant, it is not in nuclear reactors used on U.S. Navy ships.

=== Fuel ===
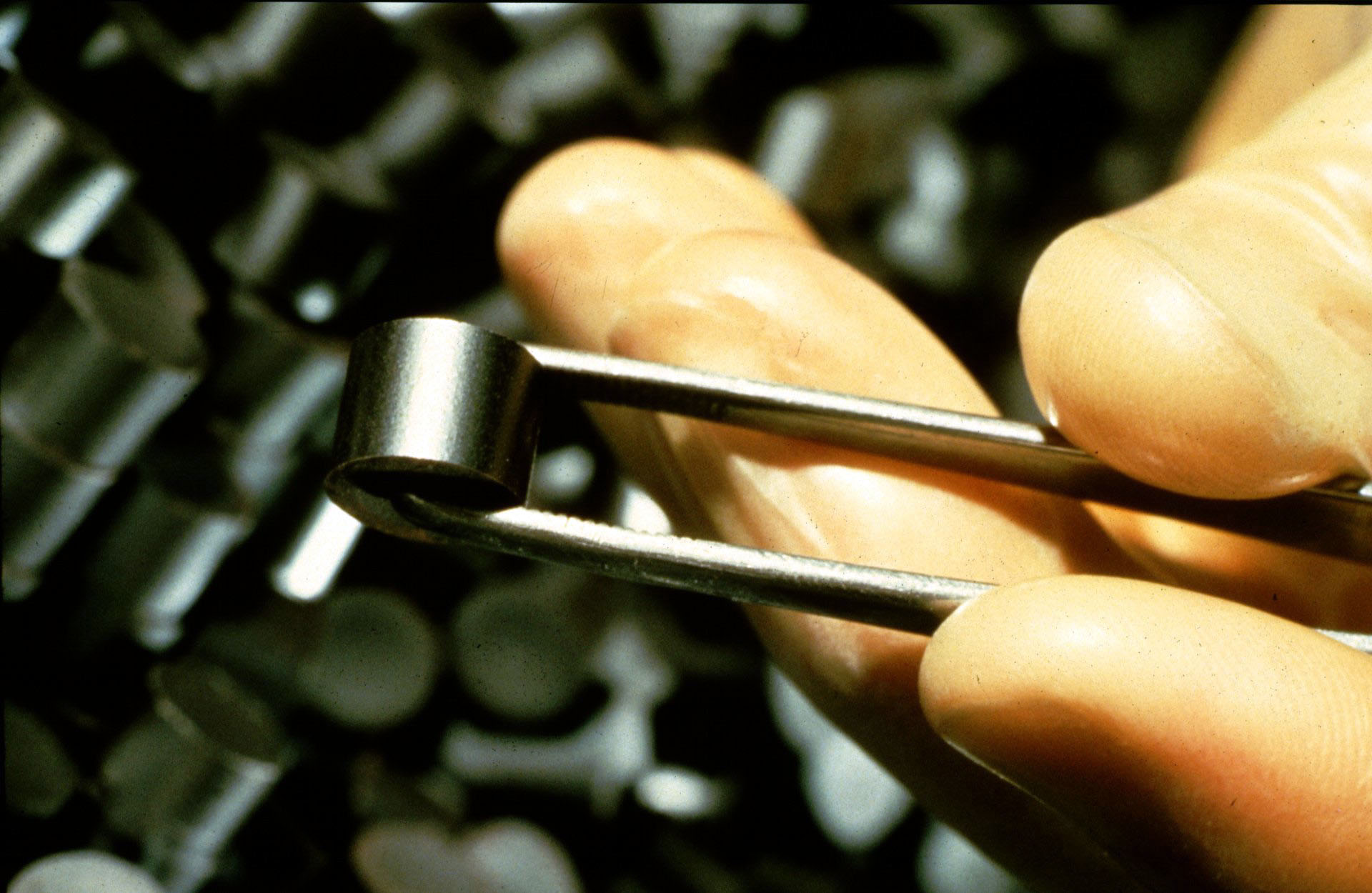
A nuclear fuel pellet

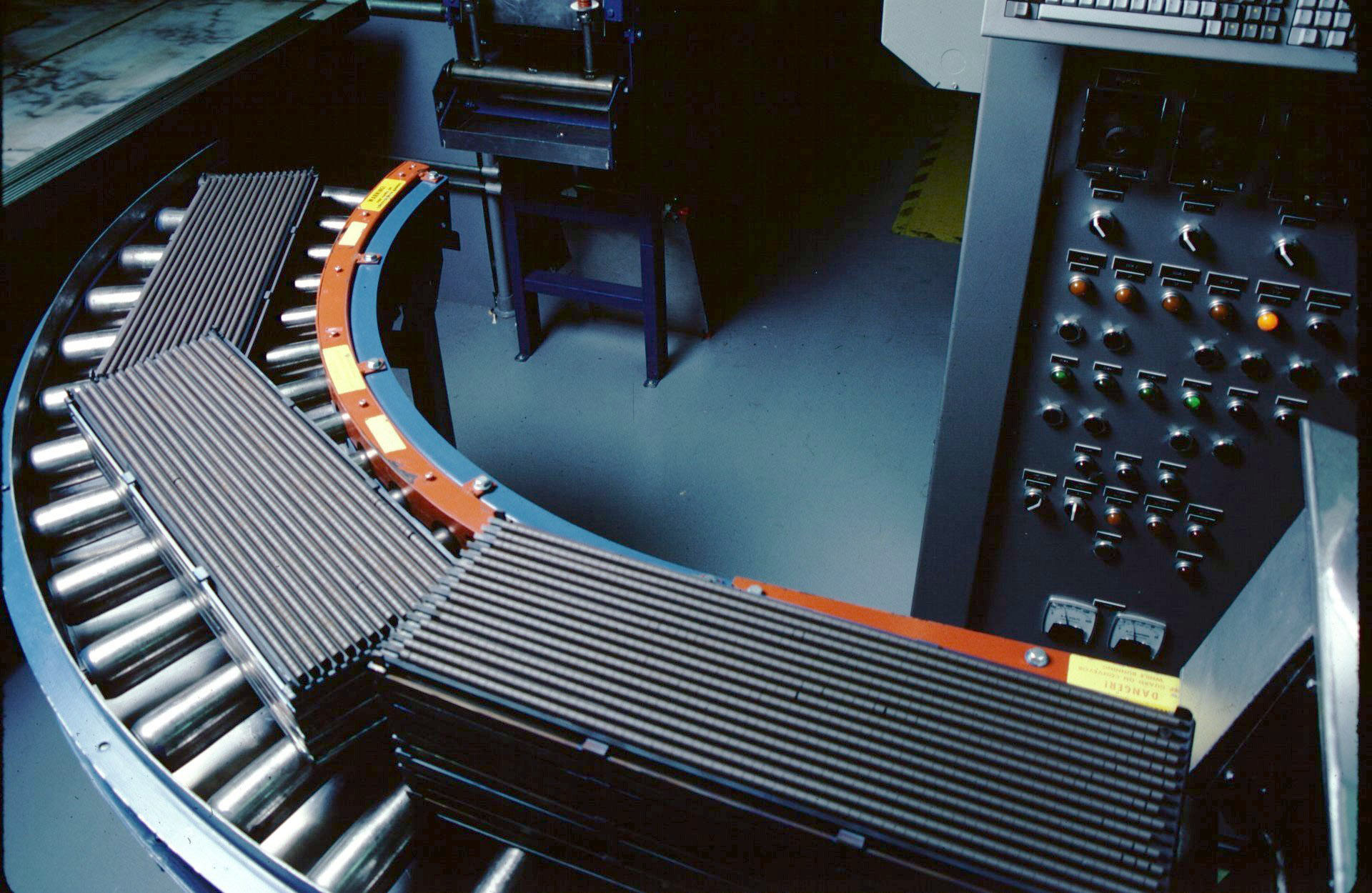
Nuclear fuel pellets that are ready for fuel assembly completion

The use of ordinary water makes it necessary to do a certain amount of enrichment of the uranium fuel before the necessary criticality of the reactor can be maintained. The light-water reactor uses uranium 235 as a fuel, enriched to approximately 3 percent. Although this is its major fuel, the uranium 238 atoms also contribute to the fission process by converting to plutonium 239; about one-half of which is consumed in the reactor. Light-water reactors are generally refueled every 12 to 18 months, at which time, about 25 percent of the fuel is replaced.

The enriched UF_{6} is converted into uranium dioxide powder that is then processed into pellet form. The pellets are then fired in a high-temperature, sintering furnace to create hard, ceramic pellets of enriched uranium. The cylindrical pellets then undergo a grinding process to achieve a uniform pellet size. The uranium oxide is dried before inserting into the tubes to try to eliminate moisture in the ceramic fuel that can lead to corrosion and hydrogen embrittlement. The pellets are stacked, according to each nuclear core's design specifications, into tubes of corrosion-resistant metal alloy. The tubes are sealed to contain the fuel pellets: these tubes are called fuel rods.

The finished fuel rods are grouped in special fuel assemblies that are then used to build up the nuclear fuel core of a power reactor. The metal used for the tubes depends on the design of the reactor – stainless steel was used in the past, but most reactors now use a zirconium alloy. For the most common types of reactors the tubes are assembled into bundles with the tubes spaced precise distances apart. These bundles are then given a unique identification number, which enables them to be tracked from manufacture through use and into disposal.

Pressurized water reactor fuel consists of cylindrical rods put into bundles. A uranium oxide ceramic is formed into pellets and inserted into zirconium alloy tubes that are bundled together. The zirconium alloy tubes are about 1 cm in diameter, and the fuel cladding gap is filled with helium gas to improve the conduction of heat from the fuel to the cladding. There are about 179-264 fuel rods per fuel bundle and about 121 to 193 fuel bundles are loaded into a reactor core. Generally, the fuel bundles consist of fuel rods bundled 14x14 to 17x17. PWR fuel bundles are about 4 meters in length. The zirconium alloy tubes are pressurized with helium to try to minimize pellet cladding interaction which can lead to fuel rod failure over long periods.

In boiling water reactors, the fuel is similar to PWR fuel except that the bundles are "canned"; that is, there is a thin tube surrounding each bundle. This is primarily done to prevent local density variations from affecting neutronics and thermal hydraulics of the nuclear core on a global scale. In modern BWR fuel bundles, there are either 91, 92, or 96 fuel rods per assembly depending on the manufacturer. A range between 368 assemblies for the smallest and 800 assemblies for the largest U.S. BWR forms the reactor core. Each BWR fuel rod is back filled with helium to a pressure of about three atmospheres (300 kPa).

=== Moderator ===
A neutron moderator is a medium which reduces the velocity of fast neutrons, thereby turning them into thermal neutrons capable of sustaining a nuclear chain reaction involving uranium-235. A good neutron moderator is a material full of atoms with light nuclei which do not easily absorb neutrons. The neutrons strike the nuclei and bounce off. After sufficient impacts, the velocity of the neutron will be comparable to the thermal velocities of the nuclei; this neutron is then called a thermal neutron.

The light-water reactor uses ordinary water, also called light water, as its neutron moderator. The light water absorbs too many neutrons to be used with unenriched natural uranium, and therefore uranium enrichment or nuclear reprocessing becomes necessary to operate such reactors, increasing overall costs. This differentiates it from a heavy water reactor, which uses heavy water as a neutron moderator. While ordinary water has some heavy water molecules in it, it is not enough to be important in most applications. In pressurized water reactors the coolant water is used as a moderator by letting the neutrons undergo multiple collisions with light hydrogen atoms in the water, losing speed in the process. This moderating of neutrons will happen more often when the water is denser, because more collisions will occur.

The use of water as a moderator is an important safety feature of PWRs, as any increase in temperature causes the water to expand and become less dense; thereby reducing the extent to which neutrons are slowed down and hence reducing the reactivity in the reactor. Therefore, if reactivity increases beyond normal, the reduced moderation of neutrons will cause the chain reaction to slow down, producing less heat. This property, known as the negative temperature coefficient of reactivity, makes PWRs very stable. In event of a loss-of-coolant accident, the moderator is also lost and the active fission reaction will stop. Heat is still produced after the chain reaction stops from the radioactive byproducts of fission, at about 5% of rated power. This "decay heat" will continue for 1 to 3 years after shut down, whereupon the reactor finally reaches "full cold shutdown". Decay heat, while dangerous and strong enough to melt the core, is not nearly as intense as an active fission reaction. During the post shutdown period the reactor requires cooling water to be pumped or the reactor will overheat. If the temperature exceeds 2200 °C, cooling water will break down into hydrogen and oxygen, which can form a (chemically) explosive mixture. Decay heat is a major risk factor in LWR safety record.

== See also ==
- Nuclear power
- Heavy water reactor
- List of nuclear reactors
- Light-water reactor sustainability
- Breeder Reactor
