= Idaho National Laboratory =

Laboratory in Idaho Falls, Idaho, United States

Coordinates: 43°32′00″N 112°56′41″W

- Motto: The energy of innovation
- Established: 1949; 77 years ago
- Research type: nuclear energy, national security, energy, and environment
- Budget: approx. $1 billion (2010)
- Director: John Wagner
- Staff: approx. 5,700 (2023)
- Location: Idaho Falls, Idaho, U.S. and a large area to the west
- Campus: 890 sq mi (2,310 km^{2})
- Affiliations: U.S. Department of Energy
- Operating agency: Battelle Energy Alliance
- Website: inl.gov
- Former acronyms: INEEL, INEL, ERDA, NRTS

Location in the United States
Location in Idaho, west of Idaho Falls

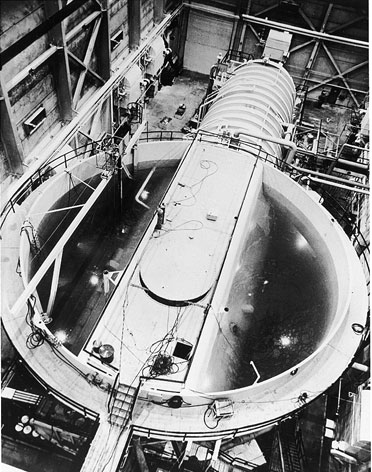
Prototype of core for USS Nautilus (SSN-571)

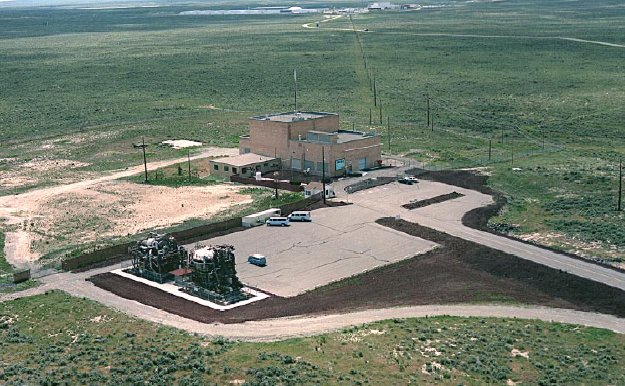
Experimental Breeder Reactor Number 1 in Idaho, the first reactor to generate a usable amount of electricity

Idaho National Laboratory (INL) in the western United States is one of the national laboratories of the U.S. Department of Energy, and is currently managed by the Battelle Memorial Institute. Historically, the lab in eastern Idaho has been involved with nuclear research, although the laboratory does other research as well. Much of the current knowledge of nuclear reactor behavior was discovered at this remote facility. John Grossenbacher, a former INL director, said, "The history of nuclear energy for peaceful application has principally been written in Idaho". The present facility resulted from the 2005 merger of two neighboring laboratories, the National Engineering and Environmental Laboratory, and the Idaho site of the western branch of Argonne National Laboratory (Argonne-West).

Various organizations have built more than 50 reactors at what is commonly called "the Site", including the ones that gave the world its first usable amount of electricity from nuclear power and the power plant for the world's first nuclear submarine. Although many are now decommissioned, these facilities are the largest concentration of reactors in the world.

Located on a 890-square-mile (2,310 km^{2}) complex in the remote high desert of eastern Idaho, it is between Arco to the west, Idaho Falls and Blackfoot to the east, and Atomic City to the south. Nearby geologic feature Big Southern Butte is to the southwest. The laboratory employs approximately 5,700 people.

== History ==
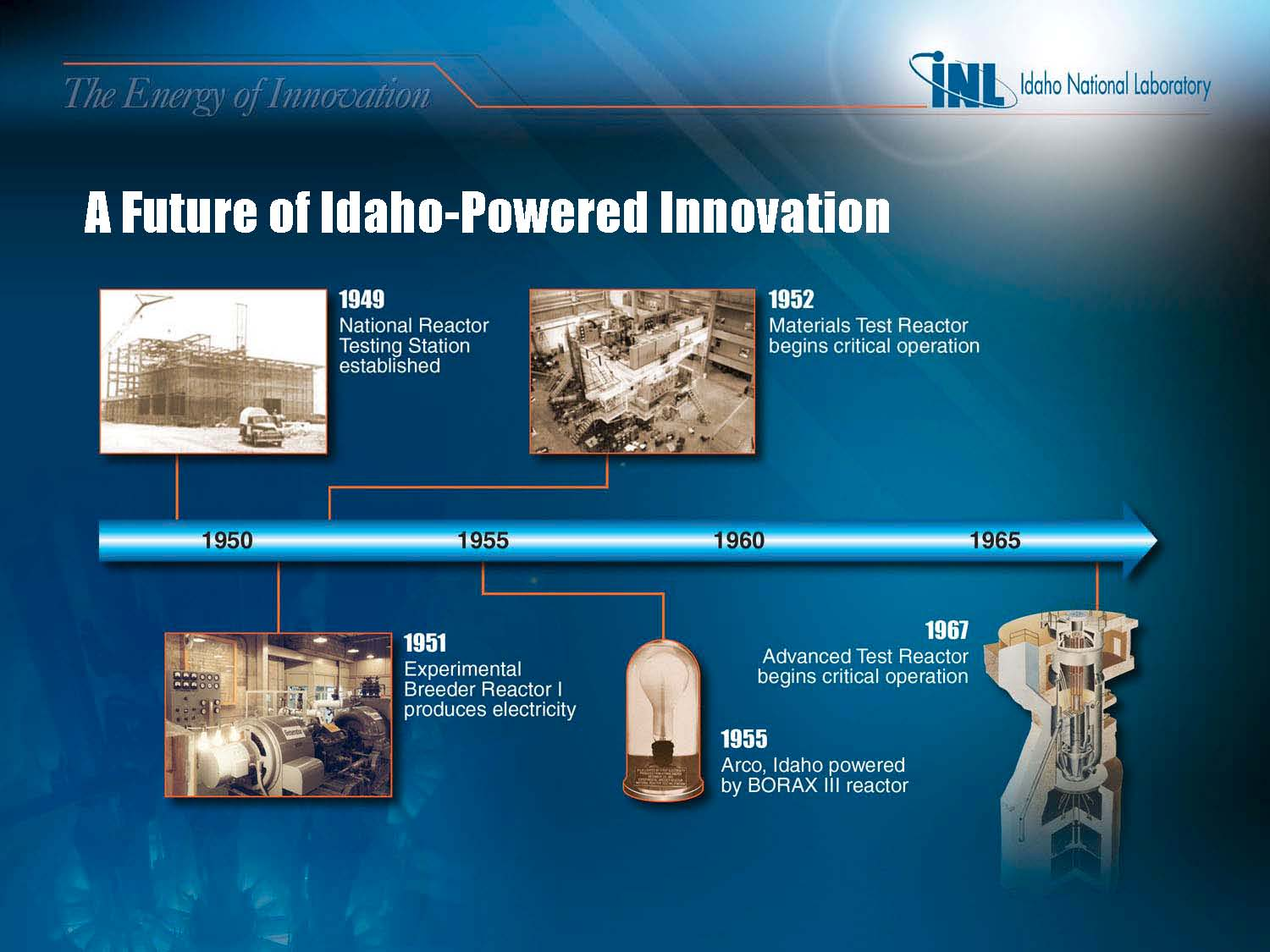
Timeline of INL events

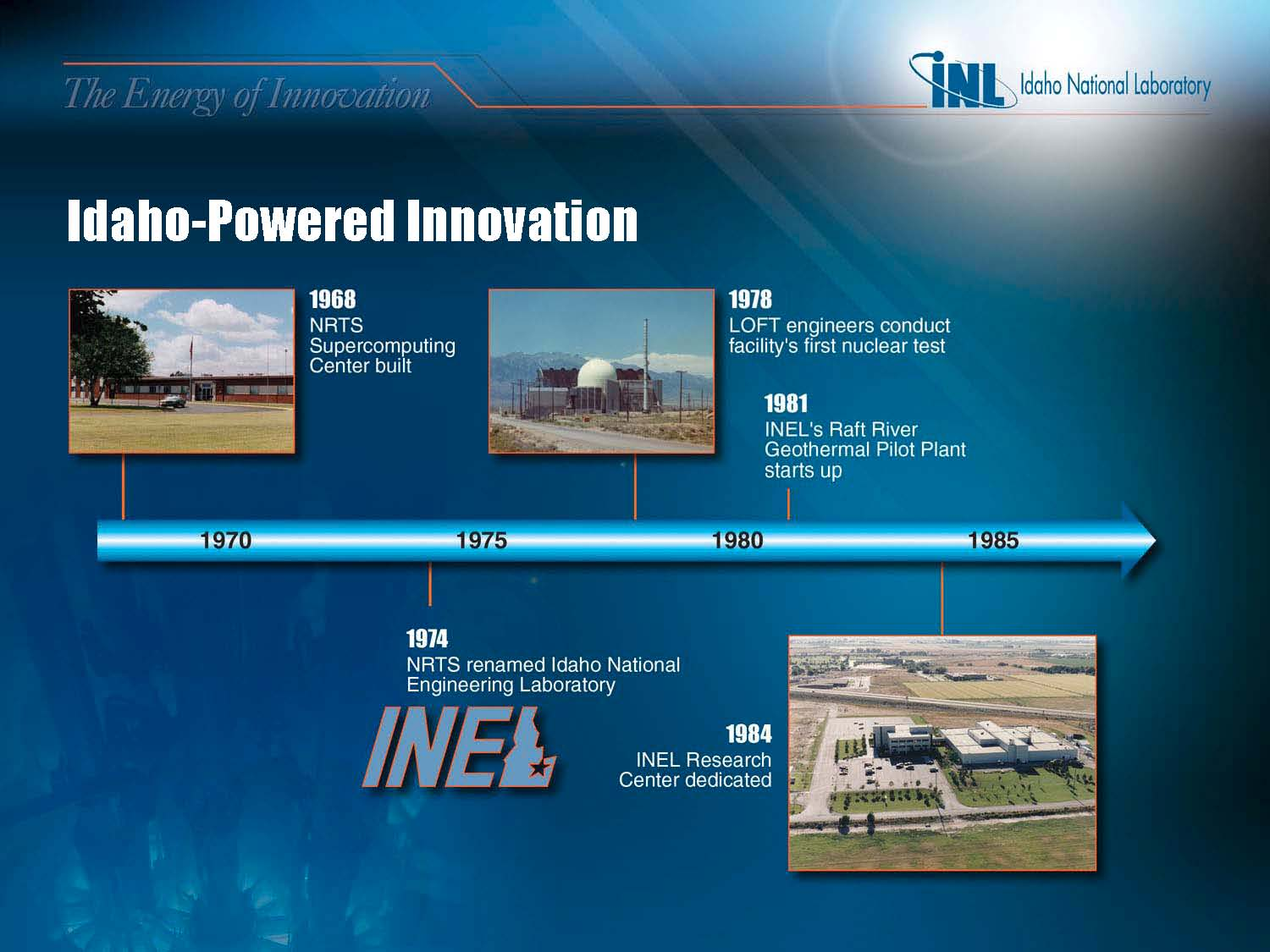
Timeline continued

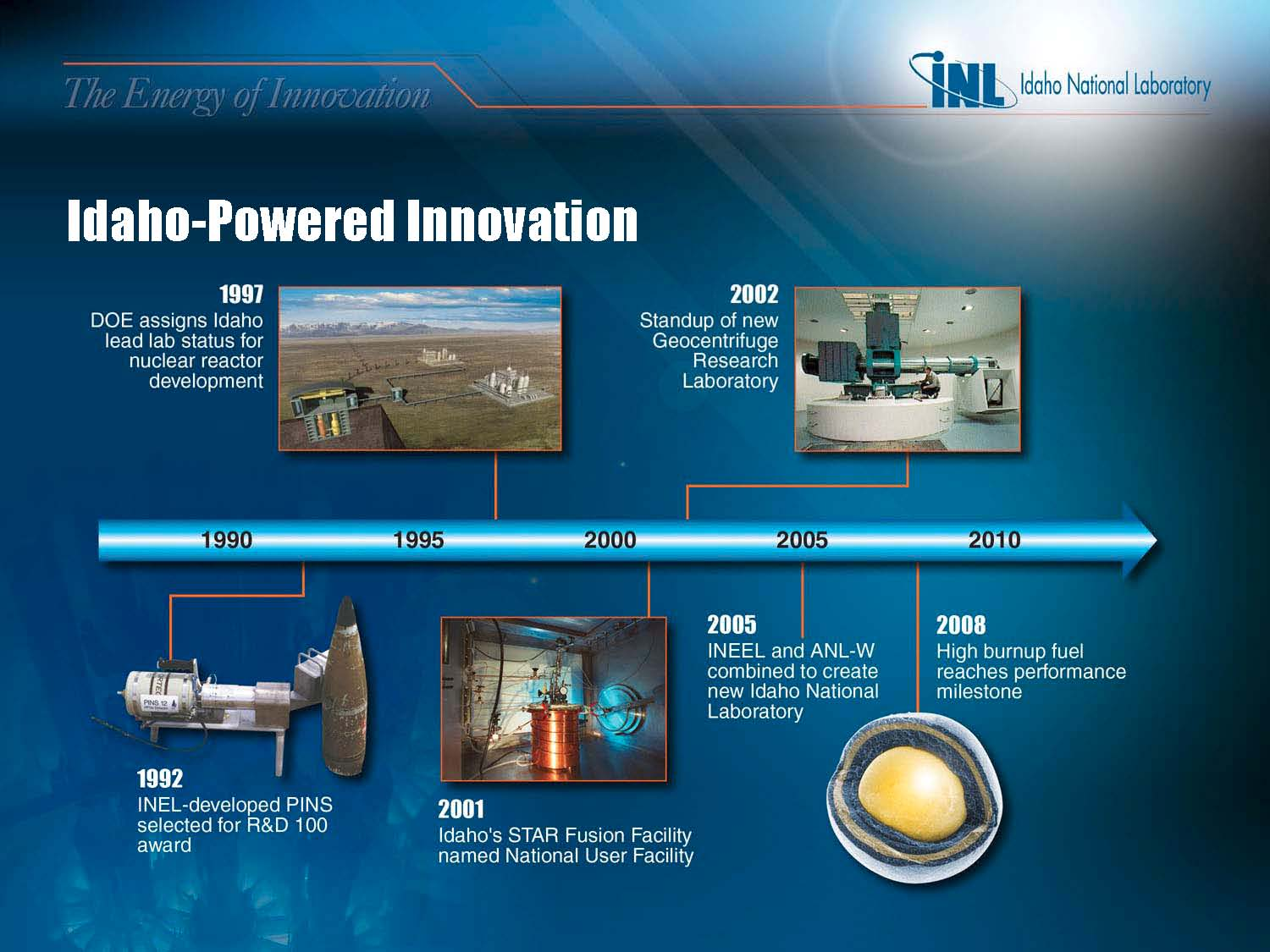
Timeline continued

The Idaho National Laboratory in southeastern Idaho began its life as a U.S. government artillery test range in the 1940s. Shortly after the Japanese attacked Pearl Harbor, the U.S. military needed a safe location for performing maintenance on the Navy's most powerful turreted guns. The guns were brought in via rail to near Pocatello, Idaho, to be re-sleeved, rifled and tested. As the Navy began to focus on post-World War II and Cold War threats, the types of projects worked on in the Idaho desert changed, too. Perhaps the most well-known was the building of the prototype reactor for the world's first nuclear-powered submarine, the USS Nautilus.

In 1949, the federal research facility was established as the National Reactor Testing Station (NRTS). In 1975, the United States Atomic Energy Commission (AEC) was divided into the Energy Research and Development Administration (ERDA) and the Nuclear Regulatory Commission (NRC). The Idaho site was renamed the Idaho National Engineering Laboratory (INEL) in 1974. After two decades as INEL, the name was changed again to the Idaho National Engineering and Environmental Laboratory (INEEL) in 1997. As of 2026, 55 nuclear reactors have been built and operated by various organizations at the facility for testing; with four maintained and operated as test reactors.

On February 1, 2005, Battelle Energy Alliance took over operation of the lab from Bechtel, merged with Argonne National Laboratory-West, and the facility name was changed to "Idaho National Laboratory" (INL). At this time the site's clean-up activities were moved to a separate contract, the Idaho Cleanup Project, which is currently managed by the Idaho Environmental Coalition, LLC. Research activities were consolidated in the newly named Idaho National Laboratory.

According to AP news reports in April 2018, a single barrel of "radioactive sludge" ruptured while being prepared for transport to the Waste Isolation Pilot Plant in Southeast New Mexico for permanent storage. The 55-gallon barrel that ruptured is part of the badly-documented radioactive waste from the Rocky Flats Plant near Denver.

== Access ==
In the Snake River Plain, INL is primarily high desert with scrub vegetation, with most of the area specifically being a Sagebrush steppe. A number of facilities and complexes are scattered throughout the area; the average elevation of the complex is 5,000 feet (1,520 m) above sea level. INL is accessible by U.S. Route 20 and U.S. Route 26, but most of the area (except Experimental Breeder Reactor I) is restricted to authorized personnel and requires appropriate security clearance. The town of Atomic City is on the INL's southern border, and the Craters of the Moon National Monument is to the southwest.

== Research ==
=== Nuclear Energy Projects ===
==== Next Generation Nuclear Plant (NGNP) ====
One part of this program to develop improved nuclear power plants is the "Next Generation Nuclear Plant" or NGNP, which would be the demonstration of a new way to use nuclear energy for more than electricity. The heat generated from nuclear fission in the plant could provide process heat for hydrogen production and other industrial purposes, while also generating electricity. And the NGNP would use a high-temperature gas reactor, which would have redundant safety systems that rely on natural physical processes more than human or mechanical intervention.

INL worked with private industry to develop the NGNP between 2005 and 2011. It was commissioned to lead this effort by the United States Department of Energy as a result of the Energy Policy Act of 2005. Since 2011, the project has languished and funding for it ceased. The design for this reactor is currently owned by Framatome.

==== Fuel Cycle Research & Development (FCRD) ====
The Fuel Cycle Research & Development program aims to help expand nuclear energy's benefits by addressing some of the issues inherent to the current life cycle of nuclear reactor fuel in the United States. These efforts strive to make nuclear energy's expansion safe, secure, economic and sustainable.

Currently, the United States, like many other countries, employs an "open-ended" nuclear fuel cycle, whereby nuclear power plant fuel is used only once and then placed in a repository for indefinite storage. One of the primary FCRD goals is to research, develop and demonstrate ways to "close" the fuel cycle so fuel is reused or recycled rather than being shelved before all of its energy has been used. INL coordinates many of the FCRD's national research efforts, including:

- Continuing critical fuel cycle research and development (R&D) activities
- Pursuing the development of policy and regulatory framework to support fuel cycle closure
- Developing deployable technologies
- Establishing advanced modeling and simulation program elements
- Implementing a science-based R&D program

==== Light Water Reactor Sustainability (LWRS) program ====
The Light Water Reactor Sustainability Program supports national efforts to do the research and gather the information necessary to demonstrate whether it is safe and prudent to apply for extensions beyond 60 years of operating life.

The Program aims to safely and economically extend the service lives of the more than 100 electricity-generating nuclear power plants in the United States. The program brings together technical information, performs important research and organizes data to be used in license-extension applications.

==== Advanced Test Reactor National Scientific User Facility (ATR NSUF) ====
INL's Advanced Test Reactor is a research reactor located approximately 50 miles (80 km) from Idaho Falls, Idaho.

The Department of Energy named Advanced Test Reactor (ATR) a National Scientific User Facility in April 2007. This designation opened the facility to use by university-led scientific research groups and gives them free access to the ATR and other resources at INL and partner facilities. In addition to a rolling proposal solicitation with two closing dates each year, INL holds an annual "Users Week" and summer session to familiarize researchers with the user facility capabilities available to them.

==== Nuclear Energy University Programs (NEUP) ====
DOE's Nuclear Energy University Programs provide funding for university research grants, fellowships, scholarships and infrastructure upgrades.

For example, in May 2010, the program awarded $38 million for 42 university-led R&D projects at 23 United States universities in 17 states. In FY 2009, the program awarded about $44 million to 71 R&D projects and more than $6 million in infrastructure grants to 30 U.S. universities and colleges in 23 states. INL's Center for Advanced Energy Studies administers the program for DOE. CAES is a collaboration between INL and Idaho's three public research universities: Idaho State University, Boise State University and University of Idaho.

==== Multiphysics Methods Group (MMG) ====
The Multiphysics Methods Group (MMG) is a program at Idaho National Laboratory (under the United States Department of Energy) begun in 2004. It uses applications based on the multiphysics and modeling framework MOOSE to simulate complex physical and chemical reactions inside nuclear reactors . The ultimate goal of the program is to use these simulation tools to enable more efficient use of nuclear fuel, resulting in lower electricity costs and less waste products.

The MMG focuses on problems within nuclear reactors related to its fuel and how heat is transferred inside the reactor. "Fuel degradation" refers to how uranium pellets and the rods they are encased in (several rods bundled together is what makes a "fuel assembly") eventually wear out over time due to high heat and irradiation inside a reactor. The group states three main objectives: "The mission of the MMG is to support the INL goal to advance the U.S. nuclear energy endeavor by:

- Furthering the state of computational nuclear engineering
- Developing a robust technical basis in multidimensional multiphysics analysis methods
- Developing the next generation of reactor simulation codes and tools"

The work done by the group directly supports programs such as the Light Water Reactor Sustainability Program's research into advanced nuclear fuels.

=== National and Homeland Security ===
INL's National and Homeland Security division focuses on two main areas: protecting critical infrastructures such as electricity transmission lines, utilities and wireless communications networks, and preventing the proliferation of weapons of mass destruction.

==== Control systems cybersecurity ====
Idaho National Laboratory (INL) has conducted vulnerability assessments and developed technologies related to infrastructure resilience. In collaboration with industry partners, the laboratory conducts work on electric grid reliability, control systems cybersecurity, and physical security systems.

INL conducts advanced cyber training and oversees simulated competitive exercises for national and international customers. The lab supports cyber security and control systems programs for the departments of Homeland Security, Energy and Defense. INL staff members are frequently asked to provide guidance and leadership to standards organizations, regulatory agencies and national policy committees.

In January 2011, it was reported by The New York Times that the INL was allegedly responsible for some of the initial research behind the Stuxnet virus, which allegedly crippled Iran's nuclear centrifuges. The INL, which teamed up with Siemens, conducted research on the P.C.S.-7 control system to identify its vulnerabilities. According to the Times, that information would later be used by the American and Israeli governments to create the Stuxnet virus.

The Times article was later disputed by other journalists, including Forbes blogger Jeffrey Carr, as being both sensational and lacking verifiable facts. In March 2011, Vanity Fair's magazine cover story on Stuxnet carried INL's official response, stating, "Idaho National Laboratory was not involved in the creation of the Stuxnet worm. In fact, our focus is to protect and defend control systems and critical infrastructures from cyber threats like Stuxnet and we are all well recognized for these efforts. We value the relationships that we have formed within the control systems industry and in no way would risk these partnerships by divulging confidential information."

==== Nuclear nonproliferation ====
Building on INL's nuclear mission and legacy in reactor design and operations, the lab's engineers are developing technology, shaping policy and leading initiatives to secure the nuclear fuel cycle and prevent the proliferation of weapons of mass destruction.

Under the direction of the National Nuclear Security Administration, INL and other national laboratory scientists are leading a global initiative to secure foreign stockpiles of fresh and spent highly enriched uranium and return it to secure storage for processing. Other engineers are working to convert U.S. research reactors and build new reactor fuels that replace highly enriched uranium with a safer, low-enriched uranium fuel. To protect against threats from the dispersal of nuclear and radiological devices, INL researchers also examine radiological materials to understand their origin and potential uses. Others have applied their knowledge to the development of detection technologies that scan and monitor containers for nuclear materials.

The laboratory's expansive desert location, nuclear facilities and wide range of source materials provide an ideal training location for military responders, law enforcement and other civilian first responders. INL routinely supports these organizations by leading classroom training, conducting field exercises and assisting in technology assessments.

=== Energy and environmental projects ===
==== Advanced Vehicle Testing Activity ====
INL's Advanced Vehicle Testing Activity gathers information from more than 4000 plug-in-hybrid vehicles. These vehicles, operated by a wide swath of companies, local and state governments, advocacy groups, and others are located all across the United States, Canada and Finland. Together, they have logged a combined 1.5 million miles worth of data that are analyzed by specialists at INL.

Dozens of other types of vehicles, like hydrogen-fueled and pure electric cars, are also tested at INL. This data will help evaluate the performance and other factors that will be critical to widespread adoption of plug-in or other alternative vehicles.

==== Bioenergy ====
INL researchers are partnering with farmers, agricultural equipment manufacturers and universities to optimize the logistics of an industrial-scale biofuel economy. Agricultural waste products—such as wheat straw; corncobs, stalks or leaves; or bioenergy crops such as switchgrass or miscanthus—could be used to create cellulosic biofuels. INL researchers are working to determine the most economic and sustainable ways to get biofuel raw materials from fields to biorefineries.

==== Robotics ====
INL's robotics program researches, builds, tests and refines robots that, among other things, clean up dangerous wastes, measure radiation, scout drug-smuggling tunnels, aid search-and-rescue operations, and help protect the environment.

These robots roll, crawl, fly, and go under water, even in swarms that communicate with each other on the go to do their jobs.

==== Biological Systems ====
The Biological Systems department is housed in 15 laboratories with a total of 12,000 square feet (1,100 m^{2}) at the INL Research Center in Idaho Falls. The department engages in a wide variety of biological studies, including studying bacteria and other microbes that live in extreme conditions such as the extremely high temperature pools of Yellowstone National Park. These types of organisms could boost the efficiency of biofuels production. Other studies related to uncommon microbes have potential in areas such as carbon dioxide sequestration and groundwater cleanup.

==== Hybrid energy systems ====
INL is pioneering the research and testing associated with hybrid energy systems that combine multiple energy sources for optimum carbon management and energy production. For example, a nuclear reactor could provide electricity when certain renewable resources are not available, while also providing a carbon-free source of heat and hydrogen that could be used, for example, to make liquid transportation fuels from coal.

==== Nuclear waste processing ====
In mid-2014, construction of a new liquid waste processing facility, the Integrated Waste Treatment Unit (IWTU), was nearing completion at INTEC on the INL site. It will process approximately 900,000 gallons of liquid nuclear waste using a steam reforming process to produce a granular product suitable for disposal. The facility is the first of its kind and based on a scaled prototype. The project is a part of the Department of Energy's Idaho Cleanup Project aimed at removing waste and demolishing old nuclear facilities at the INL site.

==== Safety and Tritium Applied Research ====
In May 2022, CNBC reported the Safety and Tritium Applied Research (STAR) program has been set up to looking into the production and safety protocols for working with tritium, the fuel that many startups are working on to commercialize fusion power.

=== Interdisciplinary projects ===
The Instrumentation, Control and Intelligent Systems (ICIS) program at Idaho National Laboratory (INL) conducts research in safeguards, control system security, sensor technologies, and robotics. The research relates to energy security and homeland security." ICIS research in resilient control systems includes work on human systems, security, and complex interdependencies.

== Outreach ==
=== Scholarships and grants ===
INL supports science, technology, engineering and math (STEM) education in classrooms across the state. Each year, the lab invests nearly $500,000 in Idaho teachers and students. Funding goes toward scholarship programs for high school graduates, technical college students and teachers who want to integrate more hands-on science activities into their lessons. INL also provides thousands of dollars' worth of classroom grants to teachers seeking to upgrade their science equipment or lab infrastructure.

=== Internships ===
The lab hires more than 300 interns each summer to work alongside laboratory employees. INL is listed by Vault, the online job resource site, as one of the best places in the U.S. to get an internship Internships are offered to high school, undergraduate, graduate and post-graduate students in applicable fields including science, engineering, math, chemistry, business, communication and other fields.

=== Small business outreach ===
In addition to subcontracting more than $100 million worth of work from Idaho's small businesses, INL technologies are often licensed to new or existing companies for commercialization. In the past 10 years, INL has negotiated roughly 500 technology licenses. And INL technology has spawned more than 40 start-up companies since 1995.

Small businesses that contract with the lab can participate in a Department of Energy program designed to enhance their capabilities. INL has worked with a variety of small businesses in this mentoring capacity, including International Management Solutions and Portage Environmental.

== Facilities ==
=== Advanced Test Reactor (ATR) complex ===
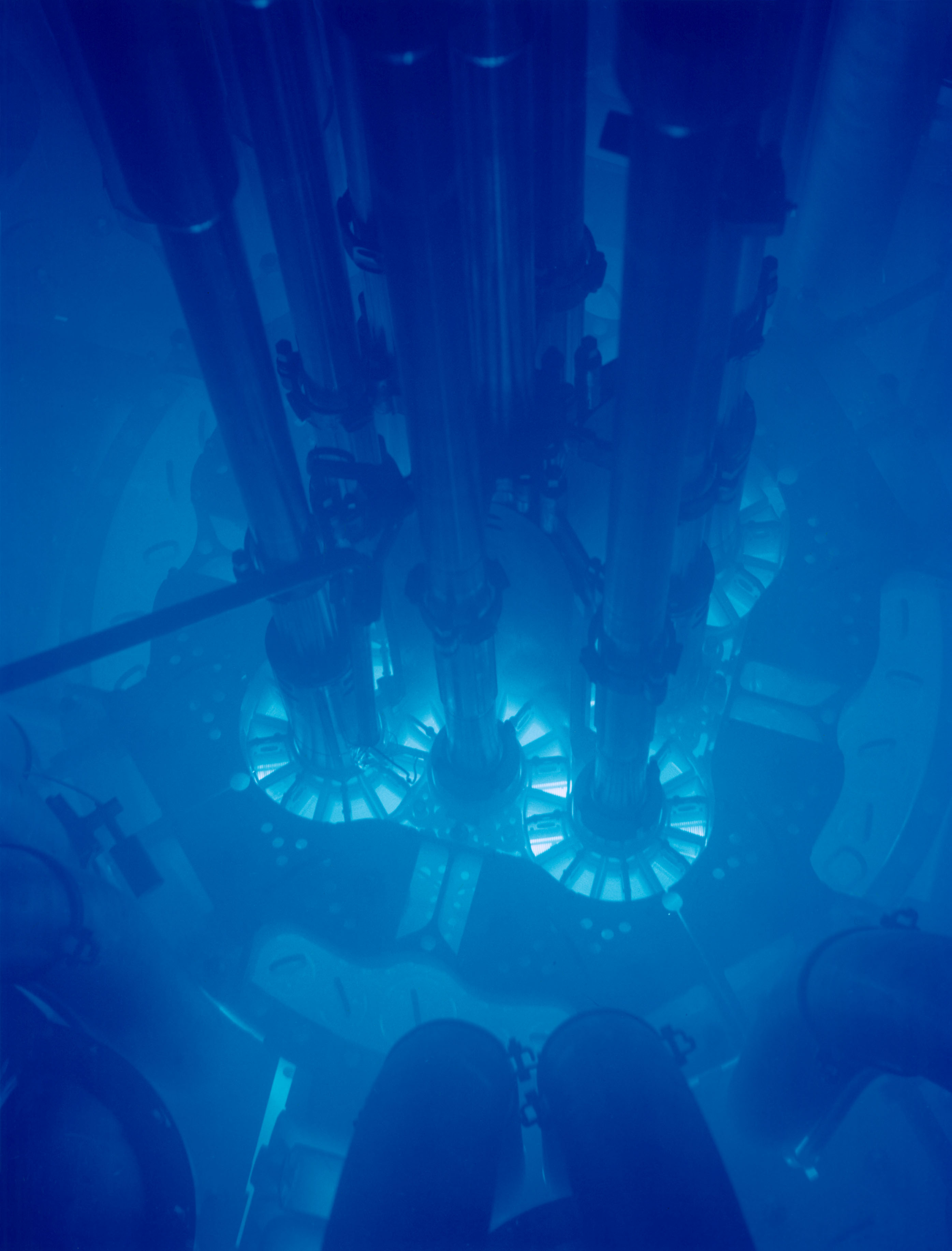
The core of the ATR

INL's Advanced Test Reactor is much smaller than the more common electricity-producing reactors—the reactor vessel measures 12 feet (3.7 m) across and 36 feet (11 m) high, with the core a mere 4 feet (1.2 m) tall and 50 inches (130 cm) across, and it does not generate electricity. As a special feature, it allows scientists to simultaneously test materials in multiple unique experimental environments. Research scientists can place experiments in one of the more than 70 test positions in the reactor. Each can generate unique experimental conditions.

Some have called the reactor a "virtual time machine", for its ability to demonstrate the effects of several years of radiation on materials in a fraction of the time.

The ATR allows scientists to place a variety of materials in an environment with specified intensities of radiation, temperature, and pressure. Specimens are then removed to examine how the time in the reactor affected the materials. The U.S. Navy is the facility's primary user, but the ATR also produces medical isotopes that can help treat cancer patients and industrial isotopes that can be used for radiography to x-ray welds on items such as skyscrapers, bridges and ship holds.

Many ATR experiments focus on materials that could make the next generation of nuclear reactors even safer and longer lasting.

=== Materials and Fuels Complex (MFC) ===
==== Hot Fuel Examination Facility ====
A video tour of the Hot Fuel Examination Facility at the Idaho National Laboratory

The Hot Fuel Examination Facility (HFEF) gives INL researchers and other scientists the ability to examine and test highly radioactive irradiated reactor fuel and other materials.

HFEF provides 15 workstations known as hot cells. For windows, each cell has leaded glass panes layered 4 feet (1.2 m) thick and separated by thin layers of oil. Remote manipulators allow users to maneuver items inside the hot cell using robotic arms. Special filtered exhaust systems keep indoor and outdoor air safe. At these stations, scientists and technicians can better determine the performance of irradiated fuels and materials. Scientists can also characterize materials destined for long-term storage at the Waste Isolation Pilot Plant in New Mexico.

==== Space and Security Power Systems Facility ====
The New Horizons mission to Pluto, which launched in 2006, is powered by a device fueled at the INL Space and Security Power Systems Facility. The Radioisotope Thermoelectric Generator (RTG) uses nonfissionable nonweapons-grade plutonium to produce heat and electricity for deep space missions such as this one.

Using the RTG on the New Horizons mission is a more practical power source for the satellite than solar panels because the satellite will travel to such a great distance that energy from the sun would provide insufficient power for the craft. Work on the project started in late 2004 and ended with the January 2006 successful rocket launch. The team implemented the fueling, testing and delivery of the RTG for the Pluto New Horizons mission and for the next Mars rover.

==== Fuel Conditioning Facility ====
INL's Fuel Conditioning Facility uses electrolysis to separate certain components from used nuclear fuel rods. Unlike traditional aqueous reprocessing techniques, which dissolve the fuel rods in acid, "pyroprocessing" melts the rods and uses electricity to separate components such as uranium and sodium out of the mix. INL is using this technique to remove the sodium metal from Experimental Breeder Reactor II (EBR-II) fuel rods so they can be safely stored in a national repository.

===== Transient Reactor Test Facility (TREAT) =====
The Transient Reactor Test Facility (TREAT) is a reactor designed specifically to test new reactor fuels and materials.

==== Radiochemistry Lab ====
The Radiochemistry Lab is a facility that includes one radiation instrumentation lab, two actinide chemistry labs, and other labs for both radiological and non-radiological research.

=== Critical Infrastructure Test Range Complex (CITRC) ===
INL's Critical Infrastructure Test Range Complex (CITRC), operated by INL, is a utility-scale electric power grid test bed. The electric grid is an operational, commercially fed system that provides power to all of INL's key research facilities on its sprawling, 890-square-mile (2,300 km^{2}) desert site; and includes: seven substations, a 24/7 staffed dispatch and control center, 61 miles of 138 kV transmission lines, and multiple distribution circuits at 15 kV, 25 kV and 35 kV. Sections of the grid can be isolated and reconfigured for integrated testing and demonstration of state of the art power systems, components and smart grid technologies.

In addition, INL owns and operates a communications network designed to research and test cellular, mobile and emerging Internet communication protocols and technology, with both fixed and mobile 3-G platforms that allow testing and demonstration within a range of experimental frequencies in a low-background environment.

=== Research and Education Campus in Idaho Falls ===
==== Center for Advanced Energy Studies (CAES) ====
This is a partnership between INL and Idaho's three public research universities—Idaho State University, University of Idaho, and Boise State University. Its researchers, who have access to each partner institution's equipment and infrastructure, have competed for and won millions of dollars in national funding for their projects. The center's laboratories are equipped with research instruments and tools, including a Local Electrode Atom Probe (LEAP) and a Computer Assisted Virtual Environment (CAVE).

==== Matched Index of Refraction (MIR) facility ====
The Matched Index of Refraction facility is the largest such facility in the world. Using light mineral oil, the facility allows researchers to use fused quartz models built to scale to study the flow of liquids inside and around objects with complicated geometries, such as the core of a nuclear reactor. The facility is basically a giant loop through which the mostly transparent oil is pumped at variable speeds. Special lasers perform "Doppler velocimetry", that produces a three-dimensional image allowing inspection of an object's flow properties. Observers can also watch the flow themselves through the polycarbonate viewing panes near the laser equipment.

==== Geocentrifuge ====
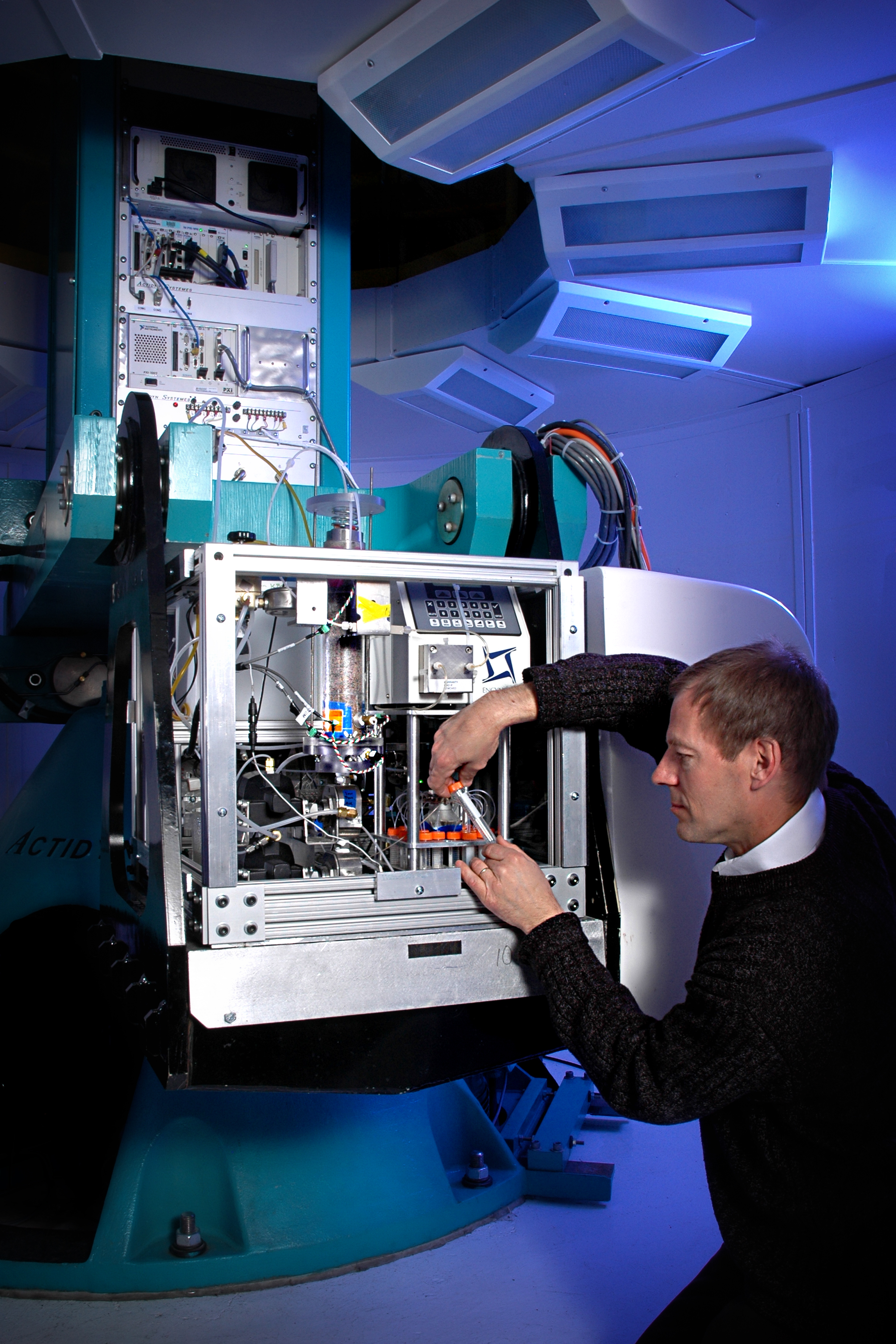
A scientist works on the large geocentrifuge of the Geocentrifuge Research Laboratory at the Idaho National Laboratory.

INL's geocentrifuge helps researchers, among other efforts, improve models of how liquids and contaminants move through engineered caps and barriers used in underground waste disposal facilities.

The INL centrifuge is one of fewer than 25 geocentrifuges larger than two meters (about 6 feet) in the United States. The centrifuge, located next to the INL Research Center in Idaho Falls, can be operated remotely by computer and is capable of applying 130 times the force of earth's gravity on a sample.

Many of the experiments that use the geocentrifuge require it to run for hundreds of hours in order to correctly simulate several years' worth of gravitational effects. The payload is monitored by an onboard computer and can be relayed to a remote monitoring station outside the centrifuge's chamber where technicians can observe developments.

== Earlier projects ==
=== Experimental Breeder Reactor I (EBR-I) ===
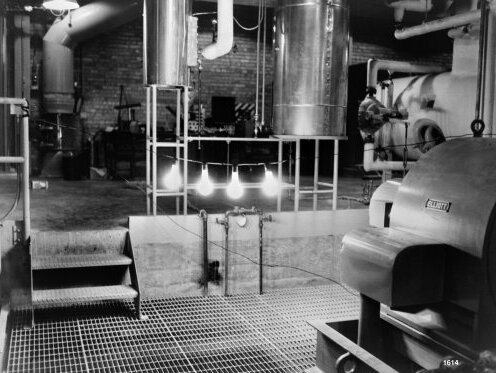
The first four bulbs lit by electricity from nuclear power hung near the generator on the second floor of EBR-I

In the early afternoon of December 20, 1951, Argonne National Laboratory scientist Walter Zinn and a small crew of assistants witnessed a row of four light bulbs light up in a nondescript brick building in the eastern Idaho desert. Electricity from a generator connected to Experimental Breeder Reactor I (EBR-I) flowed through them. This was the first time that a usable amount of electrical power had ever been generated from nuclear fission.

Only days afterward, the reactor produced all the electricity needed for the entire EBR complex. One ton of natural uranium can produce more than 40 million kilowatt-hours of electricity—this is equivalent to burning 16,000 tons of coal or 80,000 barrels of oil.

More central to EBR-I's purpose than just generating electricity, however, was its role in proving that a reactor could create more nuclear fuel as a by-product than it consumed during operation. In 1953, tests verified that this was the case. The site of this event is memorialized as a Registered National Historic Landmark, open to the public every day Memorial Day through Labor Day.

=== Experimental Breeder Reactor II (EBR-II) ===
From 1969 to 1994, Argonne National Laboratory's EBR-II produced nearly half of the electricity needed for test site operations.

In 1964, Experimental Breeder Reactor II and the nearby Fuel Conditioning Facility proved the concept of fuel recycling and passive safety characteristics. So-called "passive" safety includes systems that rely on natural physics laws such as gravity rather than systems that require mechanical or human intervention.

In a landmark test on April 3, 1986, such systems in EBR-II demonstrated that nuclear power plants could be designed to be inherently safe from severe accidents.

De-commissioning of EBR-II began in October 1994 with the removal of the 637 fuel assemblies.

=== Loss of Fluid Test (LOFT) facility ===
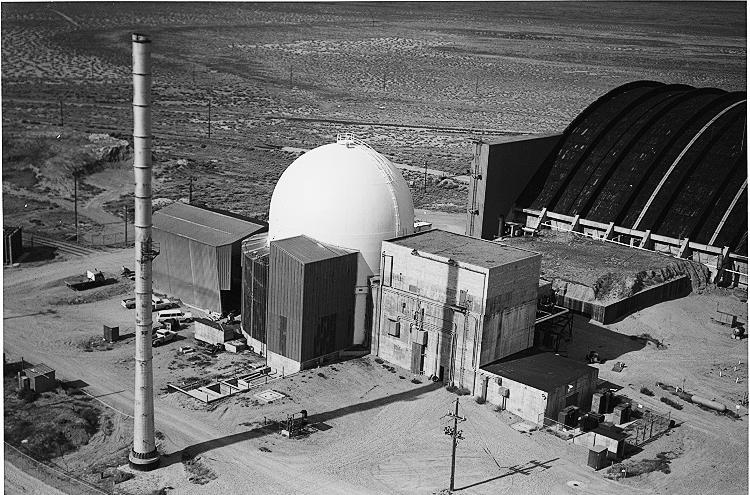
The Loss-of-Fluid-Test reactor

The world's first Loss-of-Fluid-Test reactor started up at INL on March 12, 1976. It repeatedly simulated loss-of-coolant accidents that could potentially occur in commercial nuclear power plants. Many safety designs for reactors around the world are based on these tests. LOFT experiments helped accident recovery efforts after the Three Mile Island accident in 1979.

=== Test Area North ===
In 1949, an area on the fringe of the NRTS property named "Test Area North", or TAN, was developed by the U.S. Air Force and the Atomic Energy Commission to support the Aircraft Nuclear Propulsion program's attempt to develop a nuclear-powered aircraft. The program's Heat Transfer Reactor Experiments (HTRE) were conducted here in 1955 by contractor General Electric, and were a series of tests to develop a system of transferring reactor-heated air to a modified General Electric J47 jet engine. The planned aircraft, the Convair X-6, was to be test flown at TAN, and a large hangar with radiation shielding was built on the site. The program was cancelled, however, before the accompanying 15,000-foot (4,600 m) runway could be built.

=== Naval Reactors Facility (NRF) ===
In the early 1950s, the very first full-scale prototype nuclear plant for shipboard use, called S1W Prototype, was constructed to test the feasibility of using nuclear power aboard submarines. It was the predecessor to a similar nuclear plant of S2W design installed in the first nuclear-powered ship, the submarine USS Nautilus (SSN-571). Later, two more prototype plant facilities, A1W and S5G, were built at this location called the Naval Reactors Facility (NRF for short). There is also an Expended Core Facility (ECF for short) also at NRF and administrative buildings/facilities. NRF's chemistry lab was located at the S1W prototype. By now, the prototype plants for shipboard use development have been shut down. Only the Expended Core Facility / Dry Storage Area is in use.

=== Materials Test Reactor (MTR) ===
When the nuclear industry was just getting started in the early 1950s, it was difficult to predict exactly how different kinds of metals and other materials would be affected by being used in a reactor for prolonged periods of time. MTR was a research reactor jointly designed by Argonne and Oak Ridge National Laboratories that operated until 1970 and provided important data, helping researchers make nuclear power reactors safer and longer lasting.

=== BORAX experiments ===
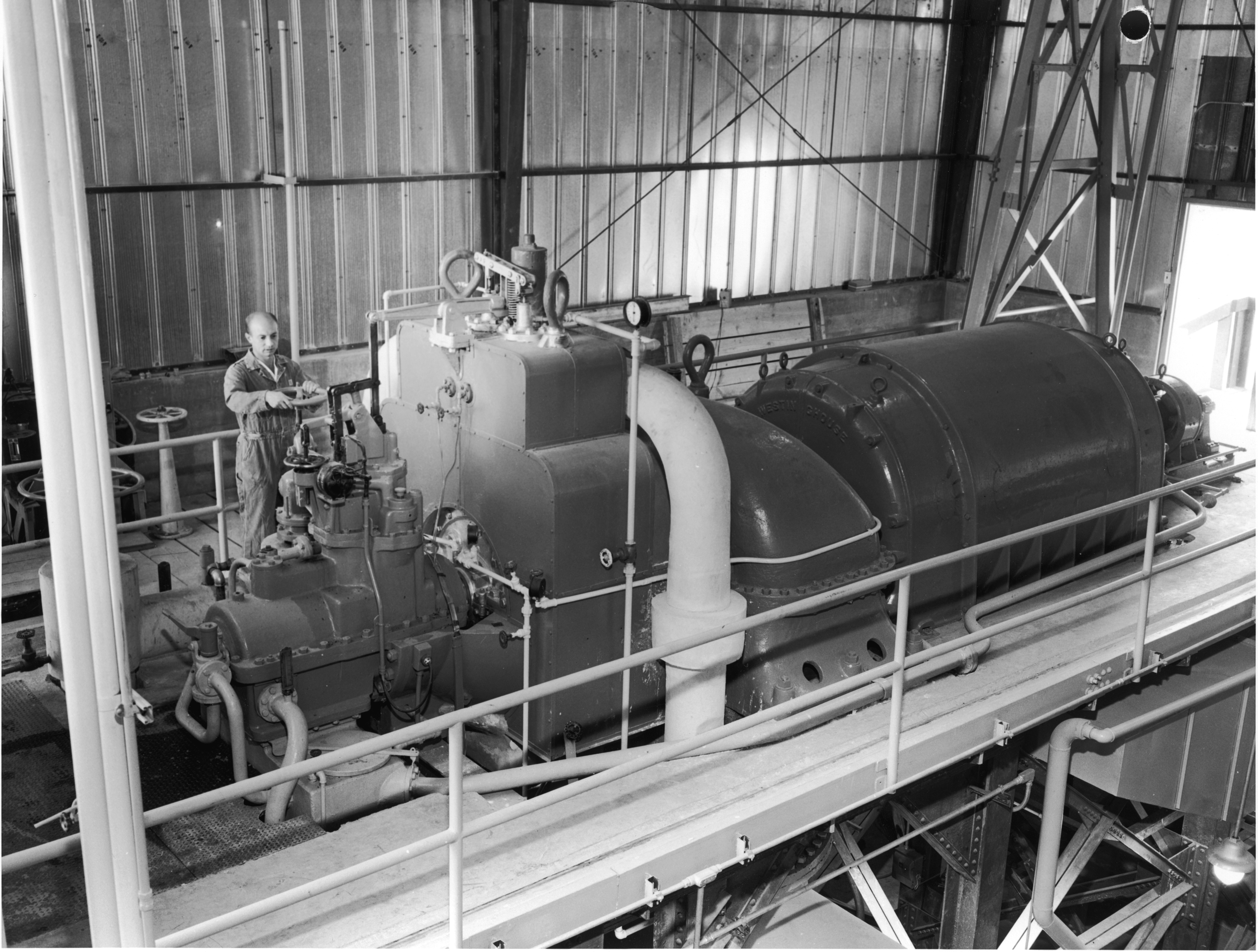
The BORAX III reactor

The Boiling Water Reactors (BORAX) experiments were five reactors built between 1953 and 1964 by Argonne National Laboratory. They proved that the boiling water concept was a feasible design for an electricity-producing nuclear reactor. The BORAX III reactor was also the first in the world to power a community (Arco, Idaho) on July 17, 1955.

=== Other sites ===
The Idaho Chemical Processing Plant chemically processed material from used reactor cores to recover reusable nuclear material. It is now called the Idaho Nuclear Technology and Engineering Center.

The Materials Test Area tested materials' exposure to reactor conditions. The Materials Test Area is part of the Advanced Test Reactor Complex.

The Information Operations and Research Center and the Shelley-New Sweden Park and Ride lot is one of fourteen Federal properties listed for disposal by the Public Buildings Reform Board in their 2019 recommendations.

== Incidents and accidents ==
=== 1961 fatal incident ===
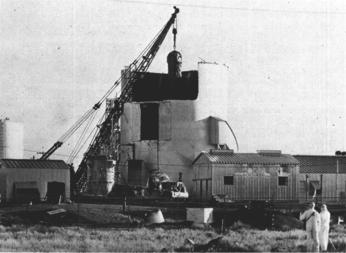
The SL-1 reactor vessel being removed from the reactor building. It had jumped over 9 feet (2.7 m) during the accident.

On January 3, 1961, the only fatal nuclear reactor incident in the U.S. occurred at the NRTS. An experimental reactor called SL-1 (Stationary Low-Power Plant Number 1) was destroyed when a control rod was pulled too far out of the reactor, leading to a near-instantaneous prompt-critical power excursion and steam explosion. The reactor vessel jumped up 9 feet 1 inch (2.77 m). The concussion and blast killed all three military enlisted personnel working on the reactor. Due to the extensive radioactive isotope contamination, all three were buried in lead coffins. The events are the subject of two books, one published in 2003, Idaho Falls: The Untold Story of America's First Nuclear Accident, and another, Atomic America: How a Deadly Explosion and a Feared Admiral Changed the Course of Nuclear History, published in 2009.

=== "Plutonium-related" container leak ===
On the afternoon of November 8, 2011, in the Zero Power Physics Reactor (ZPPR), a container leaked "plutonium-related" materials, when it was opened by one of the workers. All 17 workers at the incident were immediately taken to have testing done by the Idaho Cleanup Project in the form of whole-body counts (scanning the body for any internal radiation exposure) and were required to submit urine and fecal samples to further test for internal radioisotopes. Six of them proved to be exposed to "low-level-radiation", two of them fairly extensively. All workers were kept under close observation afterwards with repeated whole-body counts and urine and fecal sampling. The Idaho National Laboratory insisted that no radioactivity leaked outside the facility.

=== 2018 radioactive waste "drum breach" accidents ===
In April 2018, four canisters of depleted uranium sludge suddenly overpressurized and ejected their lids at a US Department of Energy facility at Idaho National Laboratory. The waste had originated from the now-decommissioned Rocky Flats weapons plutonium production plant. In 2018, anthropologist Vincent Ialenti conducted fieldwork in Idaho exploring the accident's root causes. Comparing the accident to a 2014 drum breach accident at the WIPP nuclear waste repository in New Mexico, Ialenti attributed Idaho's drum breaches to "systemic incentives to speed up waste-cleanup projects beyond their organizational capacity, without commensurately expanding their safety or oversight mechanisms."

=== 2023 data breach ===
In November 2023 hacktivist group SiegedSec breached the Oracle HR system of the Idaho National Laboratory and posted information of 45,047 former and current employees on their Telegram channel. The group demanded the laboratory research the creation of female cat-human hybrids, "catgirls", in exchange for the removal of the post containing the stolen data.

== Directors ==
No.	Image	Director	Term start	Term end	Refs.
1		Paul Kearns	October 2003	February 2005	
2		John Grossenbacher	February 2005	September 30, 2015	
3		Mark Peters	October 1, 2015	December 10, 2020	
4		John Wagner	December 11, 2020	present	

== See also ==
- Lemhi Pass thorium
- NuScale Power
