= Helium-3 surface spin echo =

Helium-3 surface spin echo (HeSE) is an inelastic scattering technique in surface science that has been used to measure microscopic dynamics at well-defined surfaces in ultra-high vacuum. The information available from HeSE complements and extends that available from other inelastic scattering techniques such as neutron spin echo and traditional helium-4 atom scattering (HAS).

== Principles ==
The experimental principles of the HeSE experiment are analogous to those of neutron spin echo, differing in details such as the nature of the probe/sample interactions that give rise to scattering. In outline, a polarized ^{3}He beam is created by a supersonic expansion followed by a spin-filtering stage (polariser). The helium scatters from the experimental sample and is detected at the end of the beamline after another spin-filtering stage (analyser). Before and after the scattering process, the beam passes through magnetic fields that precess the probe spins in the usual sense of a spin echo experiment. The raw data of the experiment are the spin-resolved scattered helium intensities as a function of the incoming magnetic field integral, outgoing field integral and any other variable parameters relevant to specific experiments, such as surface orientation and temperature. In the most general kind of scattering-with-precession experiment, the data can be used to construct the 2D 'wavelength intensity matrix' for the surface scattering process, i.e. the probability that a helium atom of a certain incoming wavelength scatters into a state with a certain outgoing wavelength.

Conventional 'spin echo' measurements are a common special case of the more general scattering-with-precession measurements, in which the incoming and outgoing magnetic field integrals are constrained to be equal. The polarization of the outgoing beam is measured as a function of the precession field integral by measuring the intensity of the outgoing beam resolved into different spin states. The spin echo case is referred to as a type of 'tilted projection measurement'. Spin echo measurements are an appropriate tilted projection for quasi-elastic measurements of surface dynamics because the raw data are closely related to the intermediate scattering function (ISF), which in many cases can be interpreted in terms of standard dynamical signatures.

== Applications ==
The surface processes that HeSE can measure can be broadly divided into elastic, quasielastic and inelastic processes. Measurements in which the predominant signal is elastically scattered include standard helium diffraction and the measurement of selective adsorption resonances. Quasielastic measurements generally correspond to measurements of microscopic surface diffusion in which the Doppler-like energy gain and loss of the helium atoms is small compared to the beam energy. More strongly inelastic measurements can provide information about energy loss channels on the surface such as surface phonons.

=== Microscopic diffusion ===
HeSE has been used to study the diffusion rates and mechanisms of atoms and molecules ('adsorbates') at surfaces. A non-exhaustive list of the research themes associated with HeSE diffusion measurements include: nuclear quantum effects in the surface diffusion of atomic hydrogen; benchmarking the adsorbate/surface free energy landscape; energy exchange ('friction') between adsorbates and the surface; pairwise and many-body inter-adsorbate interactions.

=== Selective adsorption resonances ===
HeSE has been used to construct empirical helium-surface scattering potentials through the measurement of selective adsorption resonances (bound state resonances) on the clean LiF(001) surface and the hydrogenated Si(111) surface.
