= Romania and weapons of mass destruction =

Romania started pursuing nuclear technology, according to some scholars, as early as 1967. In the 1980s, during the long rule of Nicolae Ceaușescu, Romania had a secret program intended to develop nuclear weapons, violating its word on the Treaty on the Non-Proliferation of Nuclear Weapons of 1970. The program ended after the Romanian Revolution of 1989. Romania is considered free of weapons of mass destruction, using nuclear power only for civilian purposes.

== Nuclear program ==
Socialist Republic of Romania
- Nuclear program start date: 1978
- First nuclear weapon test: None
- First thermonuclear weapon test: None
- Last nuclear test: None
- Largest yield test: None
- Total tests: None
- Peak stockpile: None
- Current stockpile: None
- Deployed warheads: None
- Total deployed warhead megatonnage: None
- Maximum missile range: None
- NPT party: Yes

Romania (as the Romanian People's Republic) started a nuclear research program in 1949, focusing on radioactive isotopes in medicine and industry. Some have interpreted Romania's actions to have a dual purpose, as the military program began in 1978, jointly operated with the program for the first power plant. The WMD research program (Programul Dunărea, meaning Danube Program) was conducted at the Atomic Physics Institute in Măgurele, under the strict supervision of the Securitate.

According to Mihai Bălănescu, the former director of the research institute, the program had three departments: one worked on nuclear weapons, one on medium-range missiles, and a third on chemical and biological weapons.

The defection of Securitate general Ion Mihai Pacepa in 1978 was, according to Lucia Hossu Longin, at least in part related to the order given to him by Ceaușescu, to obtain the technology for a certain element needed in the development of nuclear weapons. According to Ionuț Purica, former director of the Nuclear and Radioactive Waste Agency, Romania had 26 kg of plutonium from the Măgurele reactor in the 1980s. This was enough to manufacture six nuclear bombs using about 4 kg for each.

Also in 1978, Romania purchased R-17 Elbrus (Scud-B) missile systems to replace the former R-11 Zemlya (Scud-A). All rockets had conventional warheads, as according to the treaties concluded with the USSR, nuclear warheads could only be delivered in times of war. Other tactical ballistic missiles in service with Romania included the 2K6 Luna, purchased in 1962, and the 9K52 Luna-M, purchased in 1982. All systems were retired by 1998.

In July 1989, Hungarian Foreign Minister Gyula Horn accused Romania of posing military threats to Hungary through its nuclear and medium-range missile programs. Horn claimed that high-level Romanian officials announced that Romania was capable of building such weapons, but the Romanian Government denied those claims.

Other scholars have claimed that Romania was pursuing nuclear technology as a hedge, such that it could muster a weapon should the need arise.

== Anti-nuclear rallies ==
Despite this secret program, Ceaușescu's government organized massive rallies against nuclear proliferation. At one such rally in December 1981, he addressed a crowd of 300,000, arguing that both the East and West should "stop those who are preparing atomic war." He also urged the US and USSR to end the arms race which had led to the placement of medium-range missiles in Europe, saying that only by stopping this race could "humanity ... be saved from a catastrophe".

In 1989, Ceaușescu claimed that Romania had the technology to build nuclear weapons, but that he remained "firmly resolved to fight against nuclear weapons".

== Deals with other countries ==
For the early Soviet nuclear tests, Romania provided uranium through the Sovromcuarț. The Sovrom functioned as a means for the USSR to exploit Romania's resources. Between 1952 and 1960, a total of 17,288 tons of uranium ore were delivered to the Soviet Union.

During Nicolae Ceaușescu's rule, Romania was involved in negotiations with multiple states on the open market of nuclear technology and materials. After 1989, it was revealed that in 1986, the Ceaușescu Government improperly diverted a supply of 14 tonnes of heavy water to India. Heavy water is an important ingredient in the creation of nuclear weapons, and the shipment to India was another violation of the Nuclear Non-Proliferation Treaty. "In addition to playing Britain and France off against each other in the mid-1960s, Romania negotiated for nuclear power plants with Canada, Italy, Sweden, the United States, and West Germany." It engaged in negotiations with France and the US, pitting one against the other to obtain better nuclear technology and less strict conditions, as they did with other countries.

== After the 1989 revolution ==
After the 1989 Romanian Revolution, Romania announced to the International Atomic Energy Agency (IAEA) that it had 100 mg of plutonium separated in 1985 at the Pitești Nuclear Research Institute. It allowed the IAEA full access to its facilities for inspection and monitoring. According to a 1992 article in Nucleonics Week, the plutonium was made using a TRIGA research reactor, given to Romania by the United States in the 1970s.

In 2003, Romania handed over to the IAEA 15 kg of highly enriched uranium fuel for the research reactor.

With the closure of the Soviet reactor from Măgurele in 2002, 23,7 kg of spent enriched uranium was returned to Russia in 2009. Another 30 kg of enriched uranium was returned to the United States from the Mioveni (Pitești) Nuclear Research Institute. A second reactor existed at Măgurele under the name "La Baracă". It also had to be closed and is currently used only for educational purposes.

=== American weapons in Romania ===
Following the failed 2016 Turkish coup attempt, it was reported by the news website Euractiv that over 20 B61 nuclear bombs were moved from Incirlik Air Base to the Deveselu Military Base in Romania. These claims were strongly denied by the Romanian Ministry of Foreign Affairs. Furthermore, the director of non-proliferation studies at the Middlebury Institute of International Studies Jeffrey Lewis stated that the Deveselu base does not have the WS3 vaults needed to store the weapons.

== See also ==
- Radu (weapon)
