= Traian Trestioreanu =

- Self-portrait sketch
- Born: June 9, 1919; Ploiești, Kingdom of Romania
- Died: August 28, 1972 (aged 53); Doicești, Socialist Republic of Romania
- Known for: painter, sketcher, and muralist

Traian Trestioreanu (June 9, 1919, Ploiești – August 28, 1972, Doicești) was a Romanian painter, sketcher, and muralist.

== Education ==
Trestioreanu studied at the Academy of Fine Arts in Bucharest, where his teachers included the painter Camil Ressu.

== Career ==
Beginning in 1955, Trestioreanu worked as a restorer of church murals. In 1970, he restored the interior paintings of a wooden church in Târgu Mureș.

Trestioreanu died in 1972 while restoring a church in Doicești, Dâmbovița County.
