= NuScale Power =

American nuclear technology company

NuScale Power Corporation

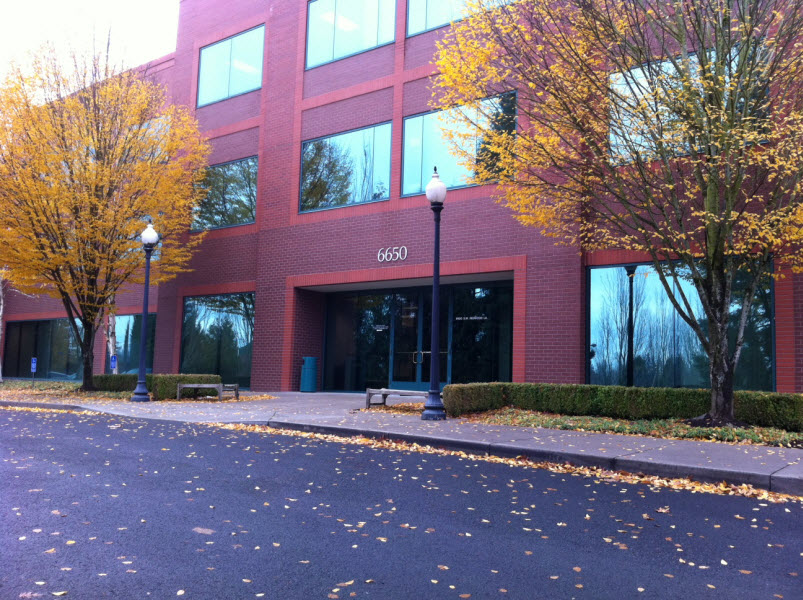
- Headquarters in Tigard, Oregon
- Type: Public
- Traded as: NYSE: SMR
- Industry: Nuclear power
- Founded: 2007; 19 years ago in Corvallis, Oregon, U.S.
- Founders: Paul G. Lorenzini; José Reyes
- Headquarters: Tigard, Oregon, U.S.
- Key people: John Hopkins (President & CEO)
- Revenue: ▲US$11.8 million (2022)
- Net income: ▼ −US$142 million (2022)
- Total assets: ▲US$349 million (2022)
- Total equity: ▲US$277 million (2022)
- Number of employees: 329 (2024)
- Website: nuscalepower.com

NuScale Power Corporation is a publicly traded American company that markets its proposed designs for small modular reactors (SMRs). It is headquartered in Tigard, Oregon.

NuScale designed two models, based on the concept of light-water reactors (LWRs), that were certified by the US Nuclear Regulatory Commission (NRC). The 50 MW_{e} NuScale US600 was in January 2023 the first SMR design certified by the NRC. The 77 MW_{e} model NuScale US460 was approved in May 2025. A series of modules can be integrated into a larger power plant.

The company had an agreement to build reactors in Idaho by 2030, but it was canceled in 2023 due to the estimated cost having increased from $3.6 billion to $9.3 billion for the original VOYGR power plant. As of 2025, the company has a number of contracts under negotiation around the world, including Romania and Tennessee.

== History ==
NuScale was founded based on research conducted by a team of nuclear scientists at Oregon State University (OSU) and funded by the United States Department of Energy (DOE) beginning in 2000. Full-scale prototype testing was performed at the Idaho National Laboratory (INL) OSU researchers, headed by José N. Reyes Jr. developed a prototype SMR in 2007, which NuScale Power used to develop its first NRC approved power module. Much of the research was performed at OSU's Multi-Application Small Light Water Reactor (MASLWR) test facility starting in 2007, with full-scale prototype testing performed in Idaho at the INL in 2013. DOE funded the research from 2000 to 2003.

The same year Oregon State University constructed its one-third-scale reactor test facility (MASLWR), the university founded NuScale Power. Joint research between OSU and NuScale soon followed. As compensation for past research, OSU offered researchers opportunities to exchange patents for an equity stake in the new company. NuScale's first round in funding came in January 2008. The next month it began seeking certification with the NRC.

By 2011, NuScale had raised $35 million and had 100 employees in Tigard; Richland, Washington; and Corvallis, Oregon. NuScale was the first to submit SMR plans to the NRC and the first to gain approval. It was evaluated by a consortium of utility companies called Energy Northwest.

=== Funding difficulties and rebound ===
In January 2011, NuScale's largest investor, Kenwood Group, was investigated by the U.S. Securities and Exchange Commission (SEC) and later pleaded guilty to operating a Ponzi scheme. The SEC investigation was not related to Kenwood's dealings with NuScale, but Kenwood's assets were frozen just as NuScale was expecting additional funding. The company started making staffing and pay cuts as executives looked for new funding sources and most of the company's employees were laid off.

That September, NuScale obtained a loan to re-hire 60 employees. In October, Fluor Corporation acquired a majority interest in the company for $3.5 million and promised almost $30 million in working capital. According to The Energy Daily, Fluor's investment saved the company, which had been "financially marooned" by its prior investor. A separate agreement gave Fluor the rights to construct NuScale-based power plants.

In August 2012, Rolls-Royce Holdings said it would support NuScale's commercialization efforts and help it obtain funding from DOE's funding opportunity announcement. In December 2012, co-founder Paul G. Lorenzini was replaced by John Hopkins as CEO. It was not funded in the first DOE's round. In the second round in December 2013, NuScale won up to $226 million in "cost-sharing" funding to share the expense of obtaining government approval, through the SMR Licensing Technical Support program. This was followed by an agreement in May 2014 for up to $217 million in funding over a five-year period, whereby DOE would match private funding.

In September 2020, the U.S. Department of Energy reported that it had provided more than $400 million since 2014 to support the NuScale development and that of other earlier stage domestic SMR designs.

=== Stock Exchange and partnerships ===
In December 2021, the Fluor Corporation reported that it had invested over $600 million in NuScale since 2011, and that NuScale was expected to go public in 2022 with Fluor owning about 60% of the stock. In May 2022, NuScale completed a merger with the special-purpose acquisition company (SPAC), Spring Valley Acquisition Corp, raising $380 million of investment. NuScale Power Corporation then listed on the New York Stock Exchange.

In September 2022, NuScale entered into an alliance with ENTRA1 Energy and the private asset management firm Habboush Group to commercialize the NuScale SMR. In May 2025, the relationship was described as "ENTRA1 Energy is NuScale's partner and independent power plant development platform, which holds the global exclusive rights to the commercialisation, distribution, and deployment of NuScale's SMRs." ENTRA1 and NuScale own a joint venture company, ENTRA1 NuScale LLC.

== Reactor designs ==
=== Development and US regulation ===
The development of NuScale's VOYGR power plants, to be powered by NuScale Power Modules, was subsidized by the U.S. Department Energy, along with other domestic SMR concepts. In January 2018, the NRC agreed that the passive safety features allow NuScale's SMR design to operate safely without back-up power. In August 2020, the NRC issued a final safety evaluation report, certifying the design as having met safety requirements. In January 2023, the NRC certified NuScale's 50 MW_{e} design for use in the US. The module is registered as NuScale US600; a standard design with 12 connected modules will have a total capacity of 600 MW_{e}.

However, the module and plant designs were resubmitted to the NRC in January 2023 for an adapted 77 MW_{e}, the model NuScale US460. In its acceptance review of the application, the NRC identified a number of sufficiency issues in the application, and requested supplemental information be supplied before NRC staff could accept the application for docketing and detailed technical review. The supplemental information was supplied in July 2023, and the NRC estimated the evaluation would be complete in July 2025. In May 2025, NuScale successfully obtained NRC-US licensing for their 77 MWe module and the two new plant configurations.

VOYGR power plants will be named after the number of modules they have. For example one with four modules VOYGR-4 and one with twelve VOYGR-12.

==== NuScale Power Module ====
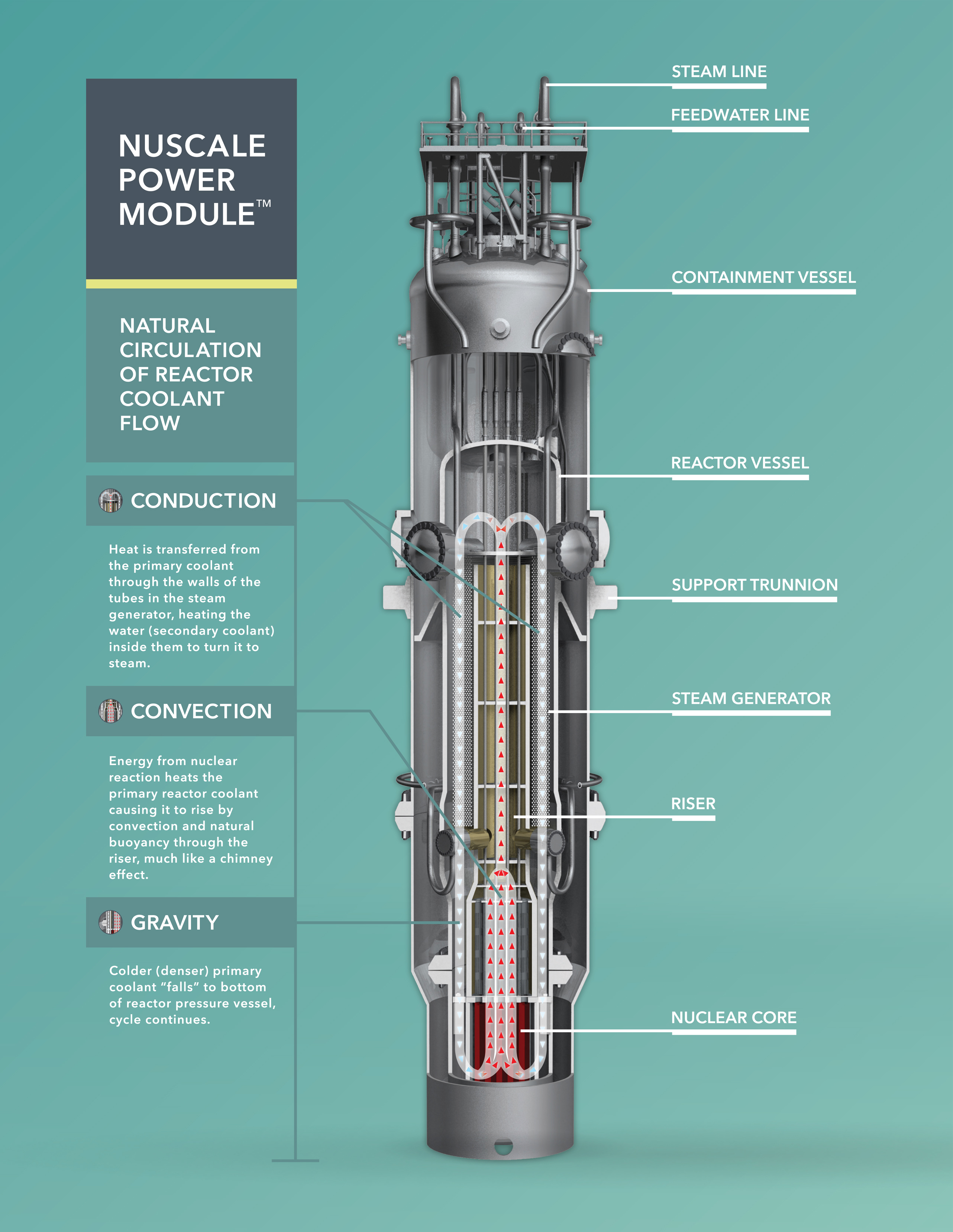
A diagram of a NuScale SMR module

NuScale SMR designs are based on the concept of light-water reactors (LWRs) with pressurized water-cooled reactor technology. The first Power Module design for plants with up to 12 modules, would be 9 feet (2.7 m) in diameter and 65 feet (20 m) tall, weighing 650 short tons (590 metric tons). The module is pre-fabricated, delivered by rail, barge or truck and assembled on-site.

In normal operating conditions, the module's containment-vessel-pressure remains near vacuum, which eliminates convection and provides simpler heat transfer conditions. The effect also reduces component corrosion and improves instrumentation reliability.

The reactor modules would be installed in the reactor pool in individual bays separated by concrete walls. During refueling, the entire reactor is moved underwater through a transfer channel to a connected pool, which contains the refueling equipment. There is also an extra reactor bay for maintenance or possible storage of a spare module. At a 12-reactor plant, the bays are arranged in two rows of six reactors with the transfer channel centrally located between rows.

The latest NRC approved power module delivers 77 MWe (gross), or about 73.5 MWe (net), (Note: Previously 45, 50, then 60 MWe) and require refueling with standard 4.95 percent low-enriched uranium-235 fuel every two years. NuScale reactors take 1% of the space of a conventional reactor and generate 77 MWe. The design uses light water for cooling and power generation as in conventional nuclear plants. Water is heated by the nuclear core, located at the base of the module. Heated water flows up the riser, then down over steam generators. As heat is transferred, the water cools and becomes denser, sinking to the bottom of the module, and the cycle is repeated. The heat creates steam that drives a small dedicated turbine generator producing electricity.

NuScale's design does not rely on powered water pumps or circulatory equipment. NuScale Power Modules are designed to shut down and cool indefinitely during most accidents. (Note: Most sources say indefinitely, but NBC News reported 30 days.) The devices are intended to be installed in a below-ground pool to absorb earthquake shocks, with a concrete lid over the pool. In the event that power is lost for normal cooling systems, the water in the pool absorbs heat and boils. The pool stores enough water to safely cool the latest 77 MWe module core for at least 72 hours without needing manual replenishment. For a 12-module configuration, the modules would be stored individually in submerged storage wells on the floor of a shared 75-foot deep, 10-million-gallon reservoir, and covered by a concrete barrier. A natural convection coolant loop would be relied upon to feed all of the modules used in a plant. The patented system is claimed to be capable of delivering additional fresh water to each reactor vessel without powered pumps in the event of an emergency.

=== Comparisons ===
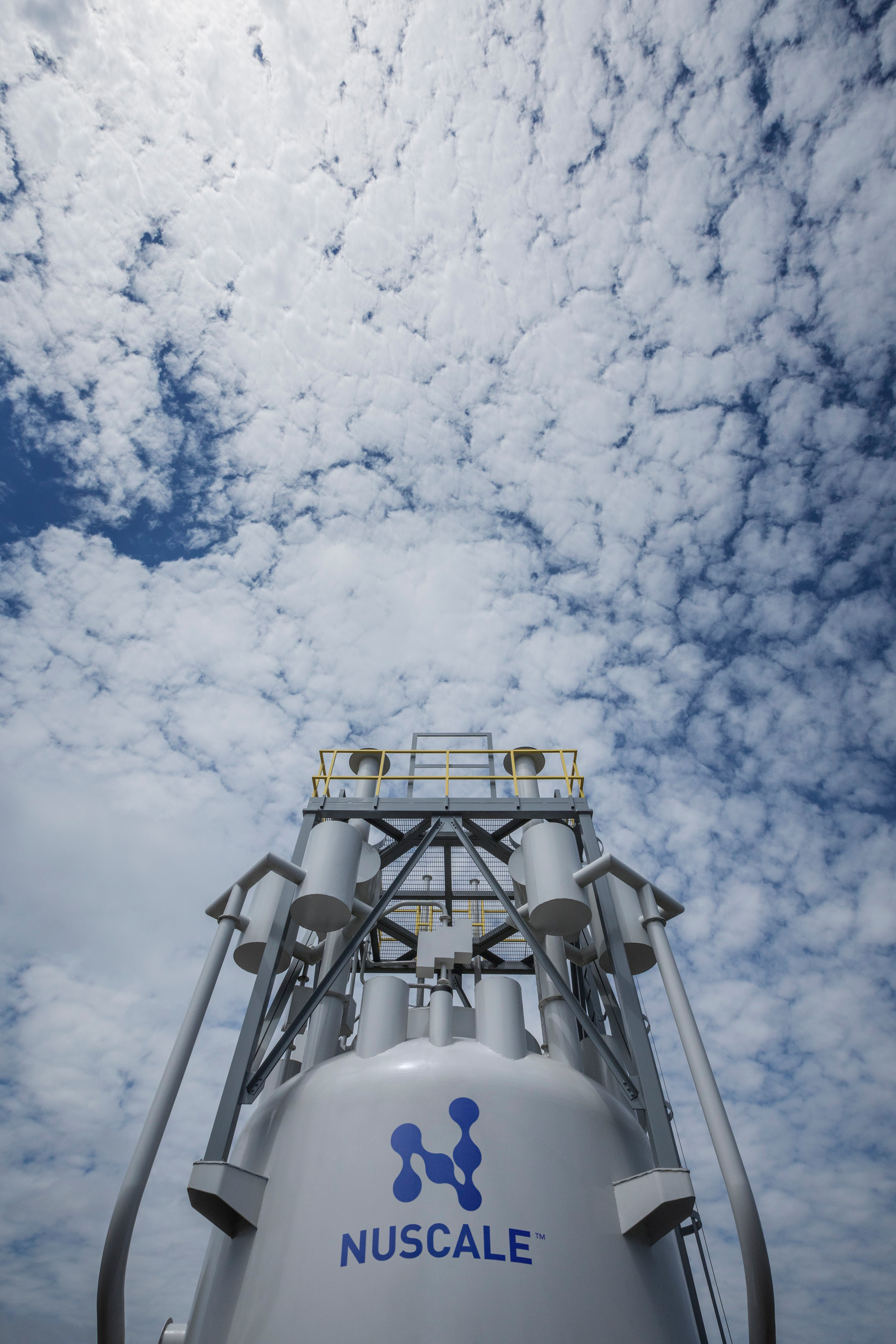
Full-scale mockup of the upper one-third of the NuScale Power Module

NuScale is expected to be the first US SMR to market because it is similar to the systems used in conventional power plants. The company estimates a twelve-unit NuScale plant would cost $4,200 (an earlier estimate was $5,000) per kilowatt. In comparison, the Energy Information Administration in 2013 estimated overnight costs to be $4,700 per kilowatt for conventional nuclear power, $4,600 for a carbon sequestration coal plant and $931 at a gas-fired plant or in excess of $1,800 for a gas-fired plant with carbon sequestration (all 2011 dollars). David Mohre, executive director of NRECA's Energy and Power Division, said SMRs like NuScale's are ideal for rural towns that need small power plants.

NuScale power plants are expected to take less time, materials and space to construct than other power sources and can be expanded incrementally to meet growing power needs. With the steam generators internal to the movable steel reactor assembly, the SMR does not have a large concrete secondary containment building as used in large PWRs. There is a single control room for up to 12 reactors. One disadvantage of the design is that the reactors lie in a large pool of water, for emergency cooling, and this pool requires much more reinforced concrete per MWe produced than a conventional nuclear reactor building, adding considerably to cost.

New Scientist reported peer‑reviewed analysis from Stanford University that assessed nuclear waste production from SMR reactors and concluded that "SMR performed worse on nearly all of our metrics compared to standard commercial reactors". The results of the study were rejected by NuScale as based on outdated information.

=== Safety concerns ===
In March 2020, a panel of independent experts from the NRC's Advisory Committee on Reactor Safeguards (ACRS) claimed to find reactor design flaws. The main issue was that in the event of an emergency shutdown condensed steam returning to the reactor vessel would be low in boron and might not absorb enough neutrons. NuScale modified its design to ensure that more boron would spread to the returning water. ACRS was concerned that operators could accidentally add deboronated water to the core. The panel found other problems: the steam generator could be prone to damaging vibrations. However, on July 29 ACRS recommended that the safety evaluation report be issued and the reactor be certified.

== Operations ==
NuScale has offices in Tigard, Oregon; Corvallis, Oregon; Charlotte, North Carolina; and Rockville, Maryland. Its headquarters are in Tigard, while its factory is in Corvallis. It maintains a test facility at Oregon State University and in Italy.

== Projects ==
=== Carbon Free Power Project, Idaho ===
In November 2014, NuScale announced it would build what it expected to be the first US SMR at the Idaho National Laboratory. The plant was for Utah Associated Municipal Power Systems (UAMPS), a subdivision of the Government of Utah, on the Carbon Free Power Project (CFPP). UAMPS operates power plants in Wyoming, New Mexico, California, and Utah, selling to local utilities. The DOE could provide supporting funds of about $140 million/year over 10 years, awaiting more Congressional support.

The company submitted designs to the NRC in January 2017 for a 12 reactor power plant producing 570 MWe at a build cost under $3 billion. In 2020, DOE approved a $1.355 billion cost-share award.

As of 2021, eight cities had withdrawn from CFPP. In July 2021, the proposal was downsized to 6 reactors, and the expected electricity price increased to $58/MWh (¢5.8/kWh).

In April 2022, Doosan Enerbility was contracted to begin manufacturing reactor components for CFPP. Doosan Enerbility expected to reach full-scale production at their plant in Changwon, South Korea, in the second half of 2023.

In January 2023, CFPP approved a new Budget and Plan of Finance, establishing a target price of $89/MWh (¢8.9/kWh) after an estimated $30/MWh generation subsidy from the 2022 Inflation Reduction Act (IRA). The projected build cost had increased to $9.3 billion for 462 MWe generation capacity from $3.6 billion for 720 MWe in 2020. $4.2 billion of the cost would be covered by the DOE and IRA support, leaving $5.1 billion of acquisition and construction costs to be covered by UAMPS members.

In November 2023, UAMPS announced it was unlikely that the project would have enough subscription to continue due to cost increases, and UAMPS and NuScale jointly decided to cancel the project. POWER magazine reported that the project had received $232 million of DOE financial support by the time it was cancelled.

Following the cancellation, NuScale laid off 154 of its staff (28%) as part of "taking steps to transition from R&D to commercialization".

=== Doicești, Romania ===
In November 2021, NuScale announced its intent to build with Nuclearelectrica its first reactors in Romania by 2028.

On December 28, 2022, Romanian company RoPower Nuclear contracted for Front-End Engineering and Design. The location was expected to be at Doicești Power Station, a former thermal power station. RoPower is a joint venture between Nuclearelectrica and Nove Power & Gas.

On July 25, 2024, RoPower Nuclear and Fluor Corporation signed the second stage Front-End Engineering and Design (FEED 2) contract, for the planned SMR project in Romania which will provide updated cost estimate and other analysis for a final investment decision. The Export–Import Bank of the United States approved a $98 million loan to RoPower Nuclear to support this design study, which would support 400 US jobs.

In February 2026, Nuclearelectrica made a decision in principle to invest in a 6-module NuScale SMR, subject to devising a funding plan. The Romanian Prime Minister Ilie Bolojan estimated the cost at $6–$7 billion and said "the complexity of such projects and the technology being in early days, I estimate we will not see the investment immediately." RoPower Nuclear will only pay for the first reactor module with NuScale responsible for the other five until the first module demonstrates full operation, which is planned for July 2033.

=== Other plans ===
In March 2012, NuScale signed an agreement with DOE that allowed NuScale and two partners to build and operate a NuScale-based nuclear power plant at a Savannah River site in South Carolina. The following month, Energy Northwest said it had no immediate plans to construct a nuclear power plant, but had evaluated all the available SMR technologies and identified NuScale as the best available option.

In July 2013, NuScale announced an effort to demonstrate NuScale reactors in the western United States, called Program WIN (Western Initiative for Nuclear), with plans to build the first NuScale-based power plant there by 2024.

In February 2022, NuScale and mining conglomerate KGHM announced a contract to construct an SMR in Poland by 2029. In April 2023, an application for a decision-in-principle to permit the project was submitted to the Polish government.

In August 2024, Nuclear Power Ghana and Regnum Technology Group signed an agreement to build a 12-module nuclear power plant in Ghana during the US-Africa Nuclear Energy Summit in Nairobi, Kenya. In January 2025, an SMR simulator training centre was opened in Ghana, to train and educate the next generation in operating future civil nuclear reactors.

In June 2025, NuScale announced new research findings showing how their plants can be used in clean water, reverse osmosis and hydrogen generation applications. Simulations showed a single NuScale Power Module could yield approximately 150 million gallons of clean water per day without generating carbon dioxide. 12 NPMs would be able to provide desalinated water for a city of 2.3 million residents and 200 metric tons of hydrogen per day or a surplus of power to provide 400,000 homes with electricity.

== See also ==
- ARC-100 Sodium Cooled Uranium Reactor, seeking Canadian regulatory licensing.
- BREST Uranium-Plutonium Lead-Cooled Reactor, under construction in Russia
- HTR-PM High-temperature gas-cooled, commissioned for operation in China
- List of small modular reactor designs
- TMSR-LF1 Thorium Molten-Salt Reactor, under construction in China
