= Doicești Power Station =

Power plant in Dâmbovița County, Romania

Doiceşti Power Station
- Country: Romania
- Location: Doicești
- Coordinates: 45.0029°N 25.3972°E
- Status: Decommissioned
- Commission date: 1953
- Owners: Nova Power&Gas

Power generation
- Units cancelled: 2 x 250 MW
- Units decommissioned: 6 x 20 MW; 2 x 200 MW

The Doiceşti Power Station was a large thermal power plant located in Doicești, with seven generation groups, six of twenty MW each and two of 200 MW resulting in a total electricity generation capacity of 520 MW. It used Lignite as main fuel supplemented by Natural gas .

The chimney used by the 200 MW units was 208 metres tall. It was demolished to clear the site for the new project using a Small modular reactor.

== Operations ==
Unit	Commissioned	Capacity(MW)	Status
Doicești - 1		20	decommissioned
Doicești - 2		20	decommissioned
Doicești - 3		20	decommissioned
Doicești - 4		20	decommissioned
Doicești - 5		20	decommissioned
Doicești - 6		20	decommissioned
Doicești - 7		200	decommissioned
Doicești - 8	-	200	decommissioned
Doicești - 9	-	250	cancelled
Doicești - 10	-	250	cancelled

== Extension plans ==
In 2011 Termoelectrica, the owner of the powerplant, and China Huadian Engineering agreed to build two new units of 250 MW each. The extension was cancelled in 2014 after the dissolution of Termoelectrica.

In 2023, Doicești was selected to implement NuScale Power VOYGR-6 model of a nuclear power plant that will deploy six SMRs of 77 MW each with a total capacity of 462 MW. For this project Nuclearelectrica formed a new company RoPower, with equal shares with the plant owner Nova Power&Gas. RoPower signed the contract with NuScale Power for phase 1 of front-end engineering and design.

In February 2026, Nuclearelectrica made a decision in principle to invest in a 6-module NuScale SMR generating 462 MWe, subject to devising a funding plan. The Romanian Prime Minister Ilie Bolojan estimated the cost at $6-$7 billion and said "the complexity of such projects and the technology being in early days, I estimate we will not see the investment immediately."
