= Radu (weapon) =

Romanian radiological weapon

Radu was, according to Ion Mihai Pacepa, a radiological weapon used against dissenters and critics by Nicolae Ceaușescu's Securitate. "Radu" is a masculine Romanian name and, in this context, is a reference to "radiation". The supposed weapon was intended to lead to cancer which would result in death within months after the exposure.

According to Pacepa, it was created by the Securitate's "Service K" in spring 1970, using radioactive materials it received from the KGB. The Romanian "Service K", founded in 1950s by the Soviets using the KGB model, was tasked with creating excuses to eliminate political prisoners whom they considered dangerous to the regime's power. This included monitoring them with microphones and trying to frame them by deceiving them into making self-compromising statements. The same Pacepa claimed the service was also in charge of discreetly murdering political prisoners and making it appear like a suicide or natural death.

Historian Mihai Pelin claimed in a book on Radio Free Europe, Melița și Eterul, that there was no such weapon, but others, such as RFE journalist Nestor Ratesh, argue that Pelin also claimed the Securitate was not involved in the 1981 RFE bombing, a position that was allegedly contradicted by Romanian president Ion Iliescu.

== See also ==
- Romania and weapons of mass destruction
