= 1-K pot =

Cryogenic device

A 1-K pot (i.e. 1-kelvin pot) is a cryogenic device used to attain temperatures down to approximately 1 kelvin.

The 1-K pot is a small vessel in a cryogenic system that is filled with liquid helium. Usually it is a few cubic centimeters in size with a pickup-tube extending into the primary liquid helium bath of the dewar. When a vessel containing liquid helium is connected to a vacuum pump, the vapor pressure above the liquid surface drops, thereby allowing the more energetic helium molecules to evaporate out of the liquid. As the particles evaporate and are pumped away from the liquid, they carry heat energy with them, so the remaining fluid tends to cool. This technique is known as evaporative cooling.

At atmospheric pressure, ^{4}He (the more abundant isotope of helium) liquefies at 4.2 K. By employing evaporative cooling, temperatures down to 1 K can be easily produced. While this technique is fairly simple to operate, it is inefficient for large helium baths because about 50% of the liquid helium must evaporate to attain to the lowest temperatures. If only a small volume needs to be cooled to 1 K, the 1-K pot is used. Only the surface of the small 1-K pot is pumped, leaving the rest of the liquid helium bath at atmospheric pressure.

While this method is commonly used in simple cryogenic systems to cool objects down to 1 K, it is also fairly popular in more complicated cryogenic systems to bootstrap to lower temperatures. For example, in a helium-3 refrigerator, condensed ^{3}He (a rare isotope of helium) is evaporatively cooled and can attain temperatures as low as 200 mK. But the ^{3}He must be condensed to a liquid first, and a 1-K pot is typically used for this purpose.

Another example is a dilution refrigerator, where a mixture of ^{3}He and ^{4}He forms a phase boundary in a mixing chamber and can cool down to a few millikelvins. Dilution refrigerators typically use a 1-K pot to condense the ^{3}He/^{4}He mixture.
