= Danube Program =

Romanian nuclear weapons program

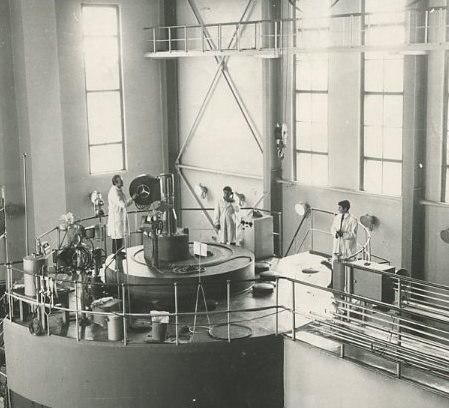
The Măgurele nuclear reactor

Map of countries which had nuclear weapon research projects, or nuclear weapons

The Danube Program (Romanian: Programul Dunărea) was a secret Romanian project to develop their own nuclear weapons. The project began in 1978, and lasted until 1989.

== History ==
In 1970 the Socialist Republic of Romania ratified the Nuclear Non-Proliferation Treaty, which banned them from developing and building their own nuclear weapons. However, from 1978 until 1989, Romania had a nuclear weapons program, including plutonium extraction facilities. The program started concomitantly with the project for the first nuclear power plant of Romania. It was carried out in secrecy at the Atomic Physics Institute from Măgurele, where a VVR-S-60 research reactor had been built between the years 1955 and 1957 by a joint Romanian-Soviet team. From 1980, the reactor used S-36 type highly enriched nuclear fuel.

In 1992, after the Romanian Revolution, the new government reported the infraction to the International Atomic Energy Agency voluntarily, who then reported it to the UN Security Council. The Măgurele reactor was shut down in 1997 and closed in 2002, with the used enriched uranium returned to Russia in 2009 and 2012.

== Materials ==
Romania acquired Highly Enriched Uranium (HEU) from United States of America's Atoms for Peace program, which gave highly enriched uranium to many countries. The project also made use of a TRIGA nuclear reactor, that had been given to them by the United States, to create plutonium from the HEU. Although the project succeeded in creating plutonium, it did not actually construct any nuclear bombs, although it is estimated that with the materials the project had, they could have made up to 240 plutonium bombs, assuming that 10 kilograms (22 lb) of plutonium would be used for every bomb.

According to Ionuț Purica, former director of the Nuclear and Radioactive Waste Agency, 26 kilograms (57 lb) of plutonium were extracted from the Măgurele reactor in the 1980s. With this amount, Romania could have manufactured six nuclear bombs.

== See also ==
- Romania and weapons of mass destruction
