= Cernavodă Nuclear Power Plant =

Nuclear power plant in Romania

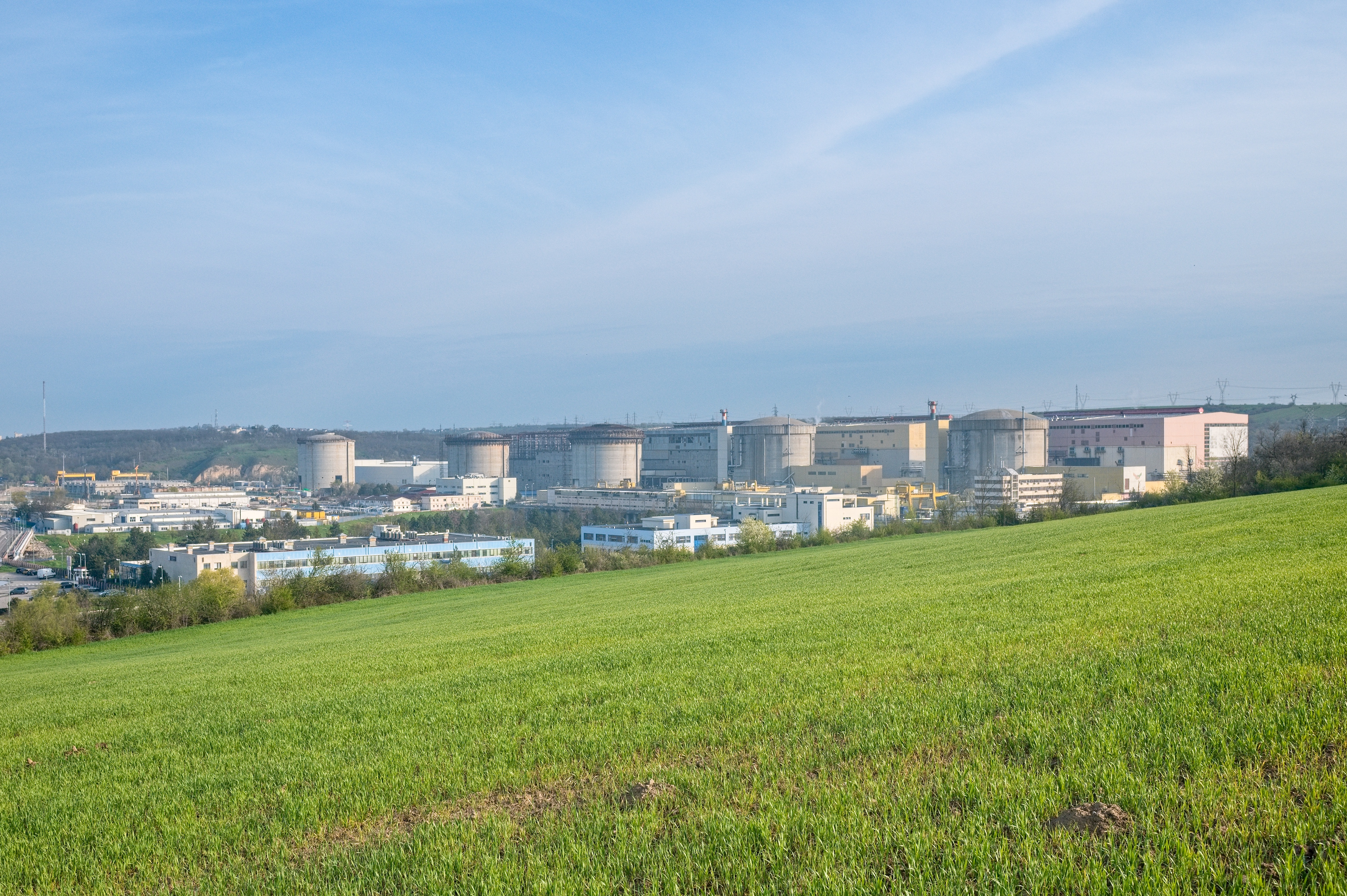
- The Cernavodă Nuclear Power Plant
- Country: Romania
- Coordinates: 44°19′20″N 28°03′26″E
- Status: Operational
- Construction began: Unit 1: 1 July 1982; Unit 2: 1 July 1983; Unit 3: 9 February 1984; Unit 4: 15 August 1985; Unit 5: 12 May 1987
- Commission date: Unit 1: 2 December 1996; Unit 2: 31 October 2007
- Operator: Nuclearelectrica

Nuclear power station
- Reactor type: CANDU PHWR
- Reactor supplier: AECL
- Thermal capacity: 2 × 2180 MW_{th}

Power generation
- Units operational: 2 × 706.5 MW
- Make and model: CANDU 6
- Units planned: 2 × 706.5 MW (suspended construction)
- Units cancelled: 1 × 655 MW (cancelled at 2.8% complete)
- Nameplate capacity: 1413 MW
- Capacity factor: 92.90% (2017); 92.05% (lifetime) 94.7%
- Annual net output: 10,580 GWh (2017)

External links
- Website: nuclearelectrica.ro/cne/
- Commons: Related media on Commons

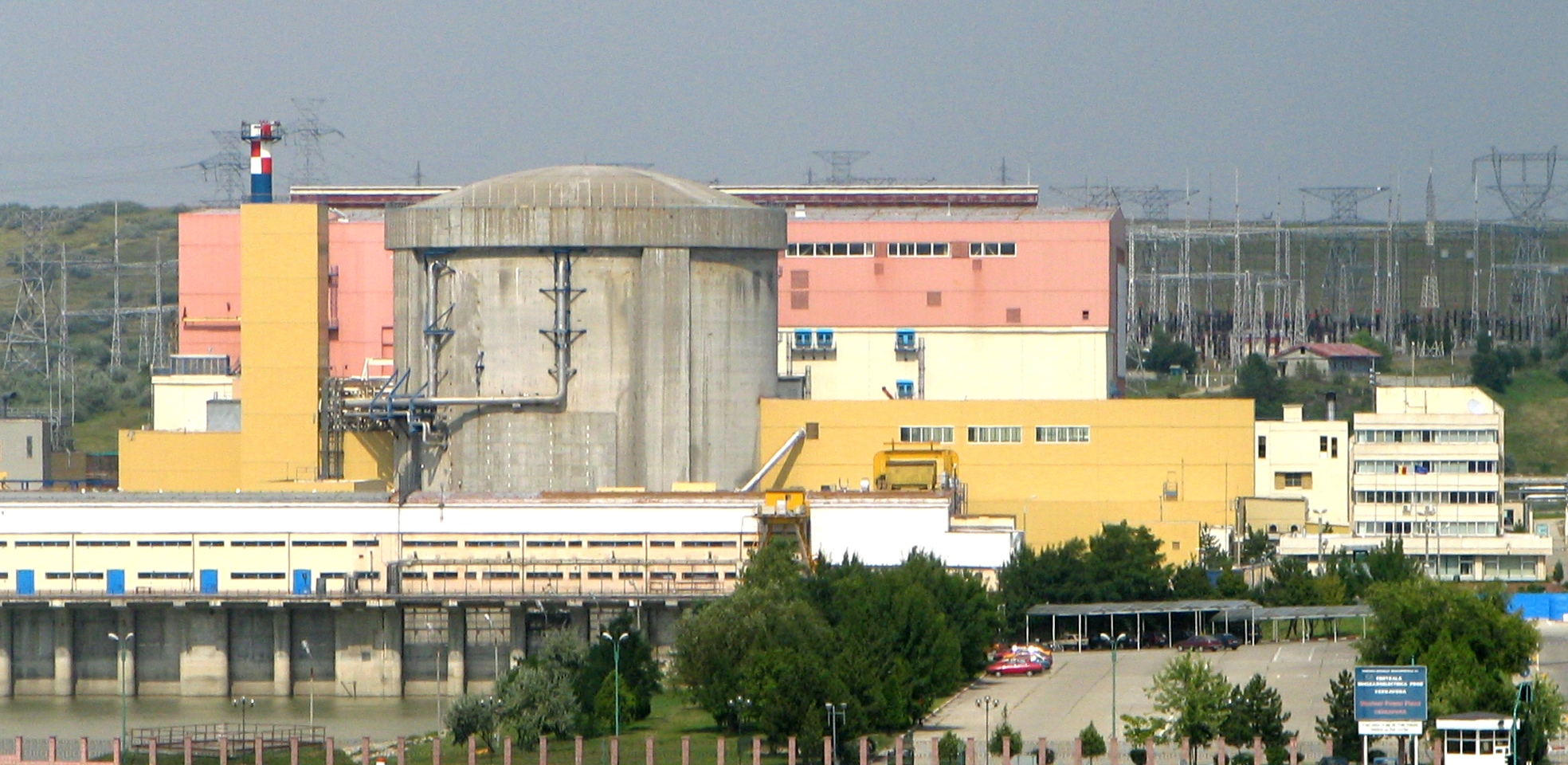
Unit 1

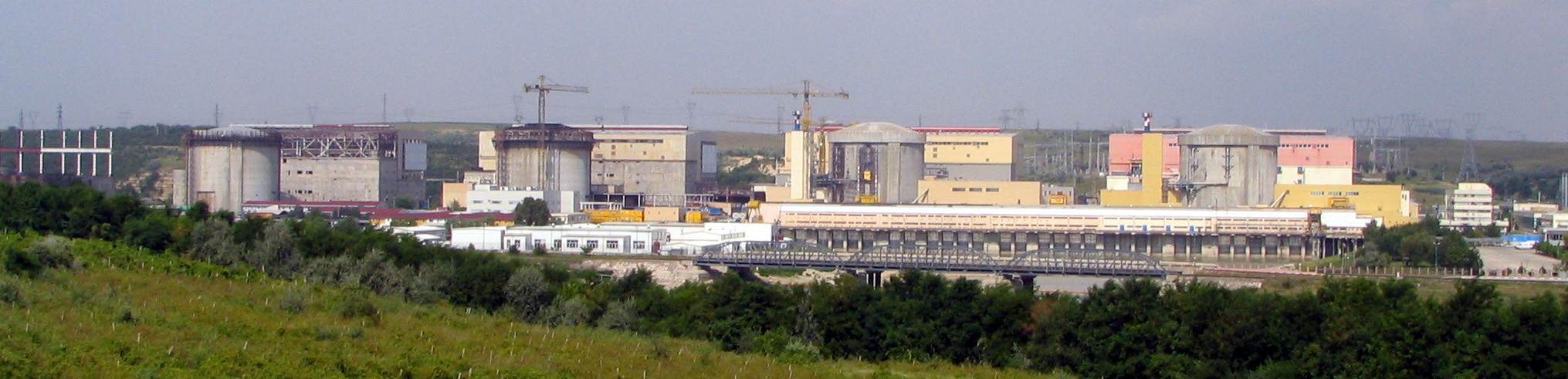
The nuclear power plant in 2006. At the time, only Unit One, on the far right, was in commercial operation. Unit two came into operation in 2007.

The Nuclear Power Plant in Cernavodă (Romanian: Centrala Nucleară de la Cernavodă) is the only nuclear power plant in Romania. It produces around 20% of the country's electricity. It uses CANDU reactor technology from AECL, using heavy water produced at Drobeta-Turnu Severin as its neutron moderator and as its coolant agent.

By using nuclear power, Romania is able to reduce its greenhouse gas emissions by over 10 million tonnes each year. CNE-INVEST is responsible for the preservation of Units 3–5.

== History ==
During the Communist era, the idea of building a nuclear power plant arose. A first plan to build the power plant on the Olt River with Soviet technology was rejected by Nicolae Ceaușescu as he wanted the country to remain independent of the USSR and avoid potential "energy blackmail". Before the project started, a team of Romanian researchers traveled to the United States in 1968 for an American Nuclear Society conference where they requested approval for the transfer of Canadian nuclear technology to Romania. The United States Atomic Energy Commission approved this request in 1970, and the feasibility study for the future power plant was completed in 1976.

The project began in 1978, the same year as the military nuclear program, and the power plant was designed in Canada by Atomic Energy of Canada Limited in the 1980s. The initial plan was to build four units, and schedule their startup from 1985 onward. A fifth unit was subsequently planned on the direct orders of Communist leader Nicolae Ceaușescu during a visit to the site. The plant's originally planned units 1 to 4 are in a neat line and unit 5 is offset due to the local geology. Units 1 and 2 are currently operational. Three more partially completed CANDU reactors exist on the same site, part of a project discontinued at the fall of the Ceaușescu regime, their work being halted since 1 December 1990.

Due to the low water levels of the Danube caused by the 2026 European heatwaves, Unit 1 was preemptively shut down on 28 July 2026. To prevent Unit 2 from shutting down, the Romanian Naval Forces carried out a controlled detonation of the Pârjoaia rock formation to redirect water on the Old Danube arm which provides the cooling water to the power plant. Four barges loaded with rocks resulted from the detonation were also sunk on the Bala branch to further redirect water towards the power plant. Despite these measures, low water required the shutdown of Unit 2 in August 2026.

== Reactors ==
=== Unit 1 ===
Unit 1, a CANDU 6-type, was finished in 1996 and produces 706.5 MW of electricity. Its scheduled startup would have been circa 1985, had it not been for the economic factors at the time.

It was commissioned and began operating at full power in 1996 and has had capacity factors of 90 percent since 2005.

In 2019 planning was progressing for a modernisation scheme for 30 years of plant life, to be carried out by Korea Hydro & Nuclear Power who have experience of CANDU modernisation at Wolseong. A refurbishment outage is expected from December 2026 and December 2028. Optimisation work was decided in 2022 to be done by Candu Energy Inc.

=== Unit 2 ===
A consortium of AECL and Ansaldo Nucleare of Italy, along with Nuclearelectrica (SNN) SA, Romania's nuclear public utility, was contracted in 2003 to manage the construction of the partially completed Unit 2 power plant and to commission it into service.

Four years later, Unit 2, another CANDU 6-reactor, achieved criticality on 6 May 2007 and was connected to the national grid on 7 August. It began operating at full capacity on 12 September 2007, also producing 705,6 MW.

Unit 2 was officially commissioned on 5 October 2007. With two units active, CNE-Cernavodă Station became the third largest power producer in the country.

=== Future expansion ===
==== Units 3 and 4 ====
Units 3 and 4 were expected to be CANDU 6 reactors with a similar design to Unit 2 and will each have a capacity of ~700 MW. The project was estimated to take up to six years after the contracts are signed.

A 2006 feasibility study carried out by Deloitte and Touche determined that the most economically viable scenario was to build the two reactors at the same time, with the cost estimated at €2.3 billion.

On 20 November 2008, Nuclearelectrica, ArcelorMittal, ČEZ, GDF Suez, Enel, Iberdrola, and RWE agreed to set up a joint company dedicated to the completion, commissioning and operation of Units 3 and 4. The company named Energonuclear was registered in March 2009.

20 January 2011, GDF Suez, Iberdrola and RWE pulled out of the project, following ČEZ which had already left in 2010, citing "Economic and market-related uncertainties surrounding this project, related for the most part to the present financial crisis, are not reconcilable now with the capital requirements of a new nuclear power project". That left Nuclearelectrica with large majority share in the project, prompting a search for other investors. In November 2013, China General Nuclear Power Group (CGN) signed an agreement to invest in the project at an undisclosed level. Shortly thereafter, ArcelorMittal and Enel announced plans to sell their stakes.

In 2016 the Romanian government gave support for the creation of a joint venture led by CGN to progress the project. In November 2015 Nuclearelectrica and CGN signed a memorandum of understanding regarding the construction, operation and decommissioning of Cernavoda 3 and 4. However, in January 2020 the government under Ludovic Orban decided to abandon the proposal.

In October 2020, new plans were launched with cooperation from the United States, Canada, and France. The two reactors are expected to become functional in 2030 and 2031, respectively.

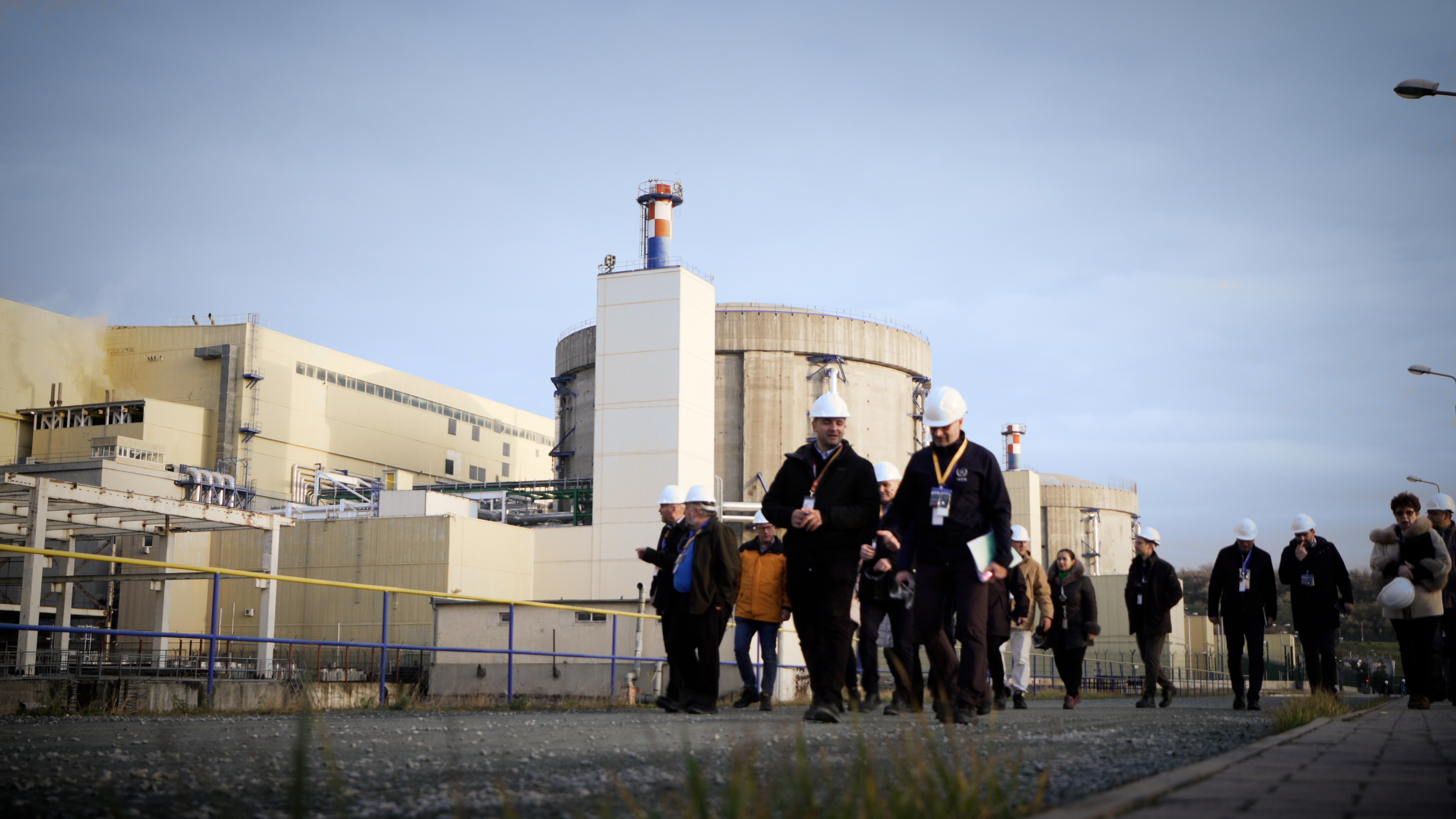
December 2024, International Atomic Energy Agency (IAEA) mission to advise on facility security

In November 2024, an engineering, procurement, and construction (EPC) contract to finish Units 3 and 4 was signed by a joint venture consisting of Fluor, AtkinsRéalis, Ansaldo Nucleare, and Sargent & Lundy Energie. The contract was signed at the 2024 United Nations Climate Change Conference (COP29) and is worth €3.2 billion.

==== Unit 5 ====
There are currently no plans to complete Unit 5 at this time. However, the possibility of finishing construction remains.

== Tritium removal facility ==
In June 2024, construction work began on the tritium removal facility at Cernavodă. The facility, built by Nuclearelectrica with Korea Hydro & Nuclear Power, will use technology developed in Romania and will become the third such facility in the world and the first in Europe. The project was started in 2023 after the contract worth $200 million was signed.

== Incidents ==
- In mid-2003, the sole operating reactor at the time had to be closed, because of a lack of cooling water. It was brought back online after roughly 2–3 months.
- On 8 April 2009, the second reactor of the Romania's Cernavodă NPP was shut down due to a malfunction which led to electrical outages.
- On 30 May 2009, Unit 1 was shut down following a water pipe crack. The Cernavodă NPP's second unit was undergoing an overhaul, so it was not producing any electricity.
- On 16 January 2010, the first unit was shut down due to steam leakage.
- On 4 May 2026, Unit 2 was forced to shut down due to a fault in a power transformer. This came shortly before the planned outage at Unit 1 on May 10th, putting both plants offline for multiple weeks.
- In July 2026, Unit 1 had to be shut down due to low water in the Danube. Unit 2 was shut down in August 2026 for the same reason.

== See also ==
- Energy in Romania
- Nuclear power in Romania
- Atucha Nuclear Power Plant - another heavy water reactor whose construction was completed after decades of interruption
