= Selective adsorption =

In surface science, selective adsorption is the effect when minima associated with bound-state resonances occur in specular intensity in atom-surface scattering.

In crystal growth, selective adsorption refers to the phenomenon where adsorbing molecules attach preferentially to certain crystal faces.

An example of selective adsorption can be demonstrated in the growth of Rochelle salt crystals. If copper ions are added to solution during the growth process, some crystal faces will slow down as copper apparently becomes a barrier to adsorption. However, by then adding sodium hydroxide to the solution, the preferred crystal faces will change once again.

== Discovery ==
Pronounced intensity minima were first observed in 1930 by Theodor Estermann, Otto Frisch, and Otto Stern, during a series of gas-surface interaction experiments attempting to demonstrate the wave nature of atoms and molecules. The phenomenon has been explained in 1936 by John Lennard-Jones and Devonshire in terms of resonant transitions to bound surface states.

== Significance ==
The selective adsorption binding energies can supply information on the gas-surface interaction potentials by yielding the vibrational energy spectrum of the gas atom bound to the surface. Starting from the 1970s, it has been extensively studied, both theoretically and experimentally. Energy levels measured with this technique are available for many systems.
