= Nuclear power in Romania =

Nuclear power stations in Romania (view)
Active plants
Future plants

Nuclear power in Romania provides around 20% of its electricity, with two nuclear reactors commencing operations in 1996 and 2007. In 2020, Romania generated a total of 56.1 TWh of electricity. The generation mix was composed of hydro (28%), nuclear (20%), natural gas (15%), coal (17%), wind (12%), solar (3%), and biofuels and waste (less than 1%). The Romanian government strongly supports nuclear energy. In 2025, nuclear power produced 21% of the country’s electricity.

== Cernavodă nuclear plant ==
In 1977 the Romanian Government signed a contract with AECL to build a five unit nuclear power plant in Cernavodă using Canadian CANDU reactor technology. The heavy water reactor design uses heavy water (produced at Drobeta-Turnu Severin) as its neutron moderator and water from the Danube for cooling. Construction started on the five reactors in 1980.

Currently the plant has two fully operational reactors and another three reactors that are partially finished. Unit One took 16 years to build, completed in 1996. It produces 705.6 MW of electricity. Unit Two took 27 years to build, achieving initial criticality in 2007 and produces 706 MW of electricity. Unit Three and Unit Four were expected to be operational by the year 2015 (thirty-five years after the start of construction) and the total electricity production of the units was to be around 1,500 MW. The total cost of the units is expected to be around US$6 billion. On 7 March 2008, Nuclearelectrica, ArcelorMittal, CEZ, Electrabel, Enel, Iberdrola and RWE agreed to set up a company dedicated to the completion, commissioning and operation of Units 3 and 4. The company was expected to be registered in May 2008.

=== Expansion of Cernavodă nuclear plant ===
In 2002 and 2006, Romania made efforts to complete units 3 and 4, respectively. The cost estimate put completion of both reactors at €2.5 billion, with seven companies investing into the project, including the state-run Societatea Națională Nuclearelectrica. The six other companies include ArcelorMittal, CEZ, Electrabel, ENEL, Iberdrola, and RWE. With investment from all these companies, unit 3 would be completed in 2014 and unit 4 in 2015. In March 2008, the Romanian government suggested that it might build another four-unit power plant by 2020. The company that operates and maintains the power plant is Nuclearelectrica.

On 20 January 2011, GDF Suez, Iberdrola and RWE pulled out of the project, following ČEZ which had already left in 2010, citing "Economic and market-related uncertainties surrounding this project, related for the most part to the present financial crisis, are not reconcilable now with the capital requirements of a new nuclear power project".

In November 2015 Nuclearelectrica and the China General Nuclear Power Group signed a memorandum of understanding regarding the construction, operation and decommissioning of Cernavodă 3 and 4.

In February 2020 the prime minister announced that the country would no longer partner with CGN for the project. In October 2020 it was announced that the United States would finance the construction of units 3 and 4, as well as the refurbishment programme of unit 1. In March 2021 Nuclearelectrica stated it expected to commission unit 3 by 2031, starting construction in about 2024. The largely-new reactors will be updated versions of the CANDU 6, but not the full EC6 version, since the concrete structures are already built. Unit 3 was reported to be 52% completed and 30% for unit 4, though in 2017 the reported figures were 15% and 14%. They would have an operating lifetime of 30 years with the possibility of a 25-year extension. Some 1000 tonnes of heavy water have been produced and are in storage.

The partner for Nuclearelectrica in the construction will be from the United States, NuScale Power, with an American, Canadian and French consortium undertaking the construction.

== Nuclear waste ==
In Romania, spent nuclear fuel is first kept at reactor sites for 6-10 years. It's then transferred to Cernavodă's Dry Storage Facility (DICA), using AECL's Macstor system, designed for 50 years of storage. The country is also constructing a repository at Saligny for low- and intermediate-level waste and operates a national repository for industrial low-level waste at Baita Bihor since 1985. Established under the Nuclear Act of 1996, the National Commission for Nuclear Activities Control (CNCAN) regulates Romania's nuclear safety and operations, ensuring compliance with International Atomic Energy Agency (IAEA) standards and overseeing licensing and safeguards.

== Energy production ==
Nuclear electricity production in Romania (TWh).
| | Nuclear | Total consumption | Percentage |
|---|---|---|---|
| 1996 | 0.91 | 58.06 | 1.57% |
| 1997 | 5.13 | 54.65 | 9.39% |
| 1998 | 4.90 | 51.14 | 9.58% |
| 1999 | 4.81 | 48.51 | 9.92% |
| 2000 | 5.22 | 49.65 | 10.51% |
| 2001 | 5.04 | 51.30 | 9.82% |
| 2002 | 5.11 | 52.18 | 9.79% |
| 2003 | 4.54 | 52.42 | 8.66% |
| 2004 | 5.27 | 53.99 | 9.76% |
| 2005 | 5.28 | 56.91 | 9.28% |
| 2006 | 5.63 | 62.69 | 8.98% |
| 2007 | 7.09 | 54.45 | 13.02% |
| 2008 | 10.34 | 58.95 | 17.54% |
| 2009 | 10.82 | 52.52 | 20.6% |
| 2010 | 10.71 | 54.98 | 19.48% |
| 2011 | 10.81 | 56.95 | 18.98% |
| 2012 | 10.56 | 54.38 | 19.42% |
| 2013 | 10.70 | 53.99 | 19.82% |
| 2014 | 10.75 | 58.14 | 18.49% |
| 2015 | 10.71 | 61.80 | 17.33% |
| 2016 | 10.39 | 60.76 | 17.1% |
| 2017 | 10.58 | 59.94 | 17.65% |
| 2018 | 10.46 | 60.81 | 17.2% |
| 2019 | 10.37 | 56.15 | 18.47% |
| 2020 | 10.58 | 53.14 | 19.91% |
| 2021 | 10.40 | 56.31 | 18.47% |
| 2022 | | | 19.35% |
| 2023 | | | 18.92% |

== See also ==
- List of commercial nuclear reactors § Romania
- Energy in Romania
