= Doicești =

- Commune
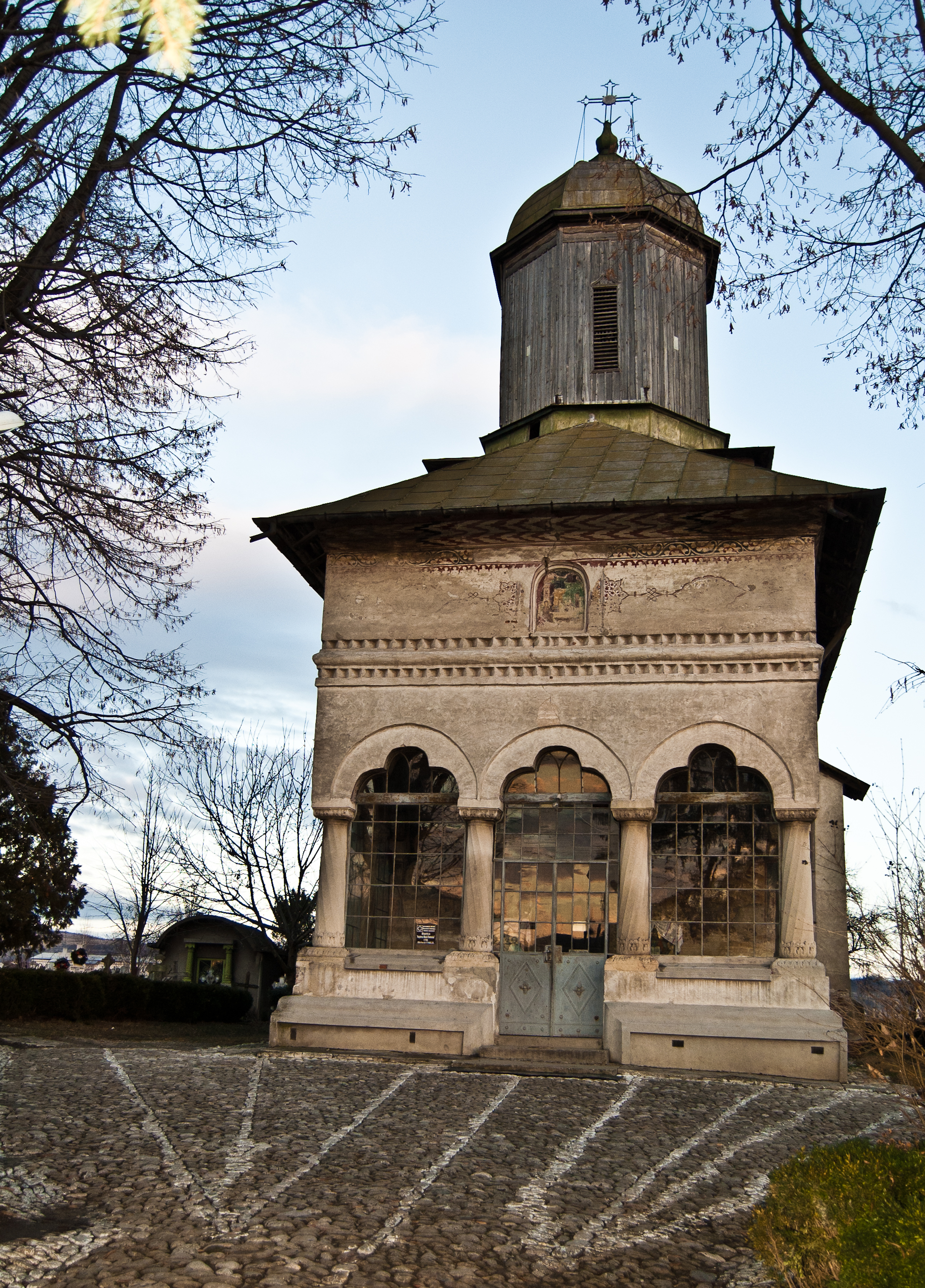
- Church of the Nativity of the Virgin Mary in Doicești

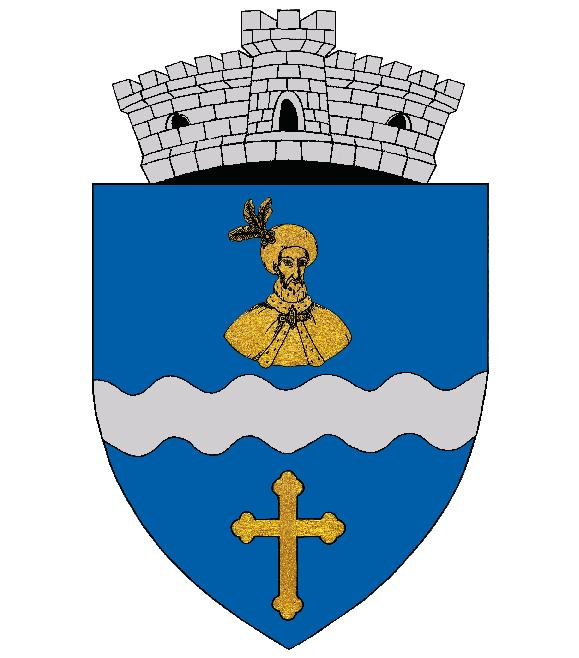
- Coat of arms

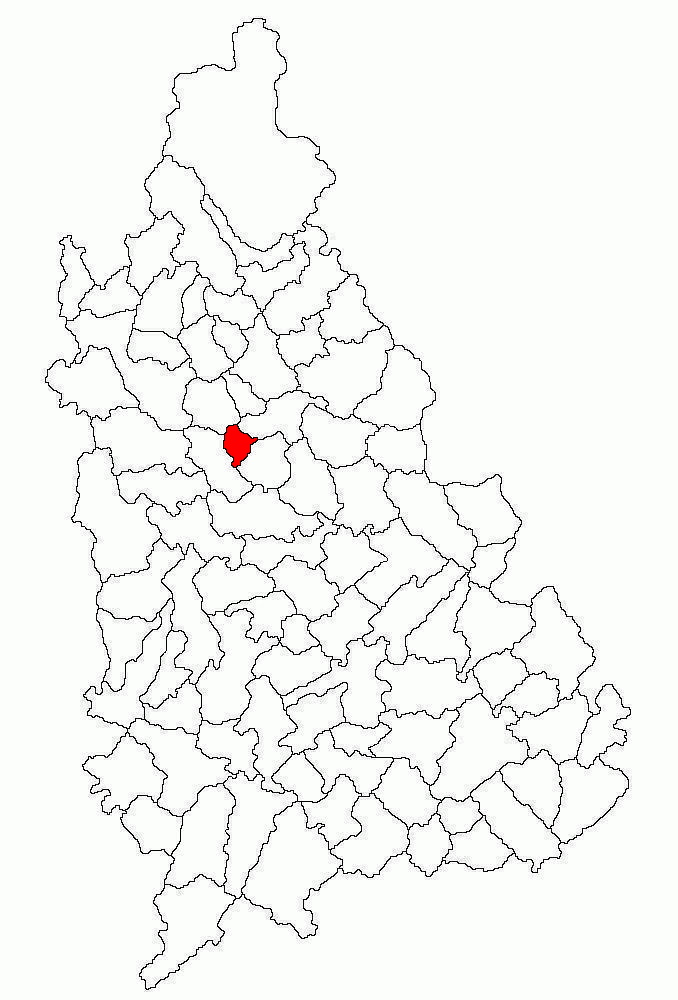
- Location in Dâmbovița County

- Location in Romania
- Coordinates: 44°59′N 25°24′E
- Country: Romania
- County: Dâmbovița

Government
  - Mayor (2020–2024): Cozmin-Petruț Stana (PSD)
- Area: 10.98 km^{2} (4.24 sq mi)
- Elevation: 337 m (1,106 ft)
- Population (2021-12-01): 4,224
  - Density: 384.7/km^{2} (996.4/sq mi)
- Time zone: UTC+02:00 (EET)
  - Summer (DST): UTC+03:00 (EEST)
- Postal code: 137095
- Area code: +(40) 245
- Vehicle reg.: DB
- Website: www.primariadoicesti.ro

Doicești is a commune in Dâmbovița County, Muntenia, Romania, with a population of 4,224 people as of 2021. It is composed of a single village, Doicești.

== Points of interest ==
- Doicești Power Station
