= Nuclearelectrica =

Romanian nuclear energy company

Nuclearelectrica S.A.

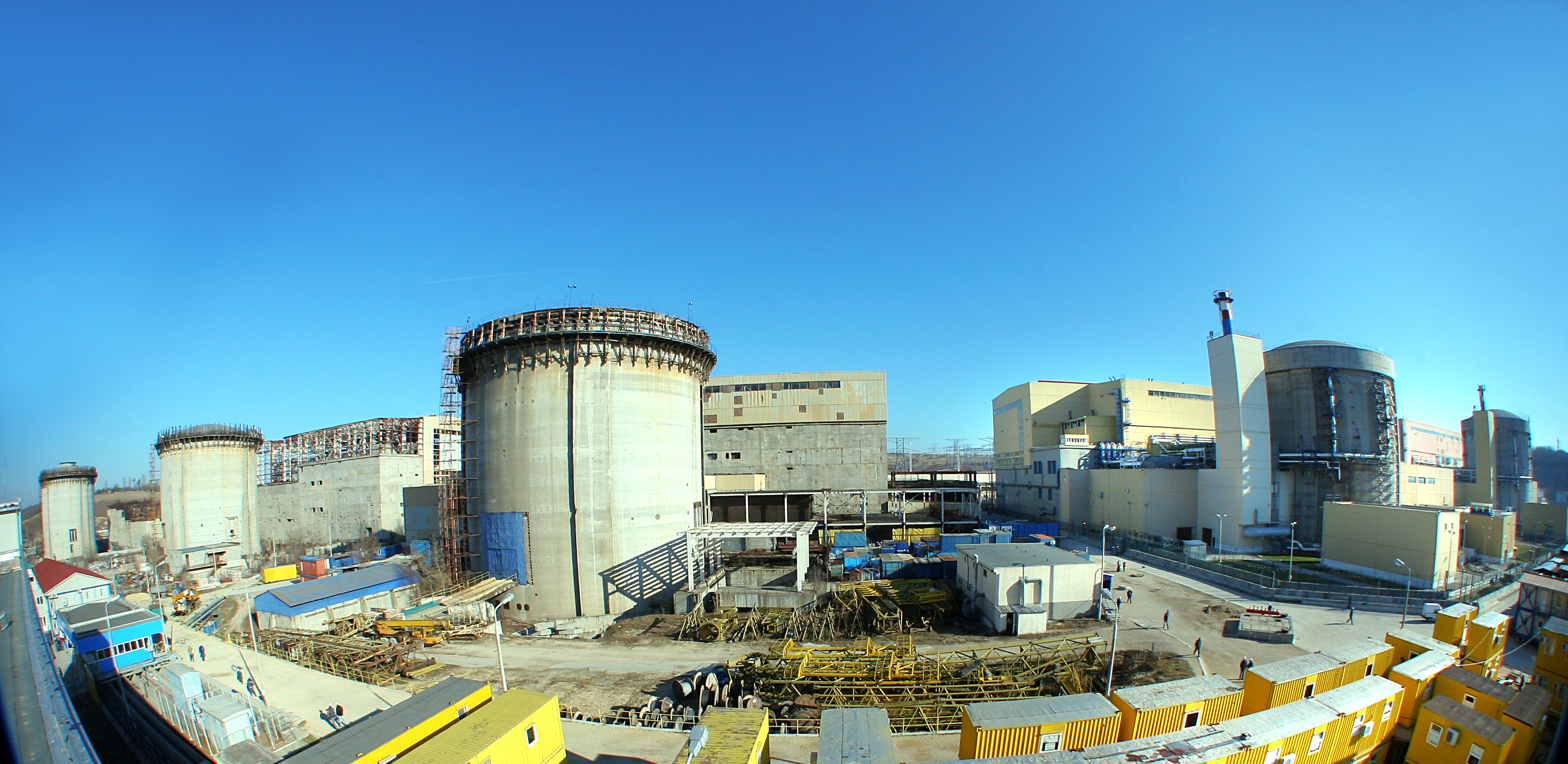
- Company type: Majority state owned company - 82,49% owned by the Romania state through the Ministry of Energy, 17.50% other shareholders
- Traded as: BVB: SNN
- Industry: Electricity
- Founded: 1998
- Headquarters: Bucharest, Romania
- Number of employees: 2200
- Website: www.nuclearelectrica.ro

SN "Nuclearelectrica" S.A. (SNN) is a partially state-owned Romanian nuclear energy company incorporated in 1998 by the reorganization of RENEL. The company is under the authority of the Ministry of Energy, and the state has 82.49% of the shares and other shareholders - 17.50% after listing the company at the stock exchange in 2013.

The field of activity of Nuclearelectrica is the manufacture of electricity, thermal energy and nuclear fuel. Nuclearelectrica is the only producer of nuclear energy in Romania.

The company has two branches:

- CNE Cernavodă branch, operates Units 1 and 2 at CNE Cernavoda and auxiliary services;
- The Nuclear Fuel Plant (FCN) of Pitești.

SNN also has 100% of the shares of project company Energonuclear, incorporated in order to implement the project for Units 3 and 4 of CNE Cernavodă.

The Cernavodă Nuclear Power Plant was designed with an initial profile of five reactors with Canadian technology, of CANDU type, with installed power of approximately 700 MW each. Until now (December 2020), 2 units have been built. Unit 1, which became commercially operational in 1996, and Unit 2, which became commercially operational in 2007, collectively ensure approximately 18% of the energy necessities of the country. The power plant began construction during the Nicolae Ceaușescu era and had several delays for various reasons. There are often proposals to finish construction of the partially built units 3, 4 and 5 either in cooperation with Candu Energy (current owner of CANDU technology patents and marketing rights) or some other pressurized heavy water reactor manufacturer. A contract between Candu Energy and EnergoNuclear, a partially owned subsidiary of Nuclearelectrica set up in 2009 to determine the future of Cernavodă units 3 and 4, to finish construction of those reactors was finally signed in late 2021.

The nuclear fuel plant Pitești FCN manufactures nuclear fuel bundles of type CANDU 6 that are necessary for the operation and production of electricity in Units 1 and 2 at Cernavodă, and in the future by doubling the production capacity, it will provide nuclear fuel also for units 3 and 4.

By the Resolution of the General Assembly of Shareholders of SNN of November 2013, the termination of the works at Unit 5 as a nuclear unit and changing its destination in order to use the existing structures in other activities of SNN.

The development of Units 3 and 4 of CNE Cernavodă is part of the energy strategy of Romania until 2030, with year 2050 as a reference, and from the National Integrated Plan in the Field of Energy and Climate Change, as nuclear energy represents a pillar of decarbonization and ensuring the energy independence of Romania.

Also, SNN is implementing the project of refurbishing Unit 1, a project which involves the extension of the lifecycle of the unit by another 30 years, under the same nuclear safety conditions.

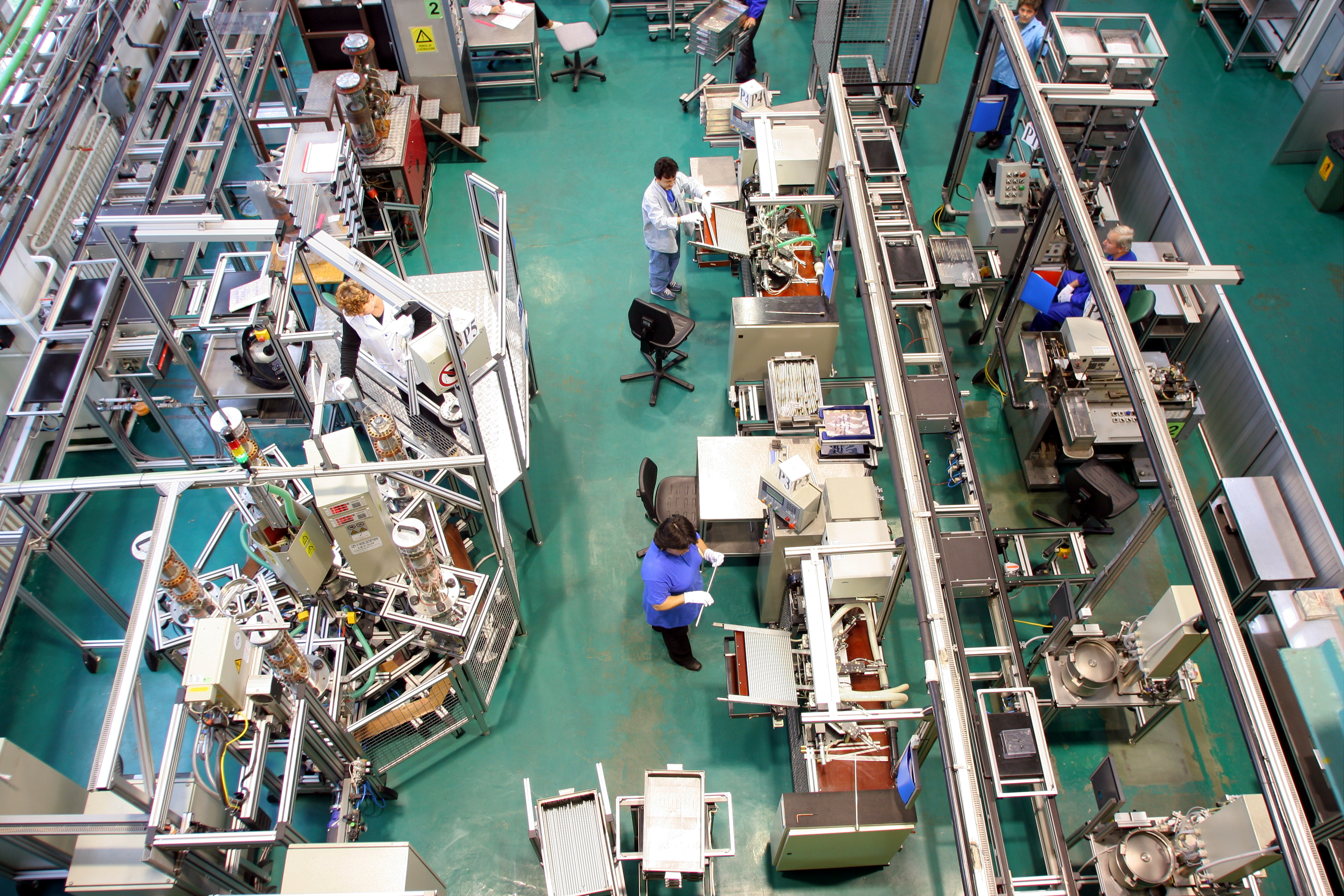
Pitești Nuclear Fuel Plant

== See also ==
- Energy in Romania
- Nuclear power in Romania
