= Savannah River Site =

US Department of Energy reservation in South Carolina

Savannah River Site
- Aiken, Allendale and Barnwell in South Carolina; Near Augusta, Georgia in United States
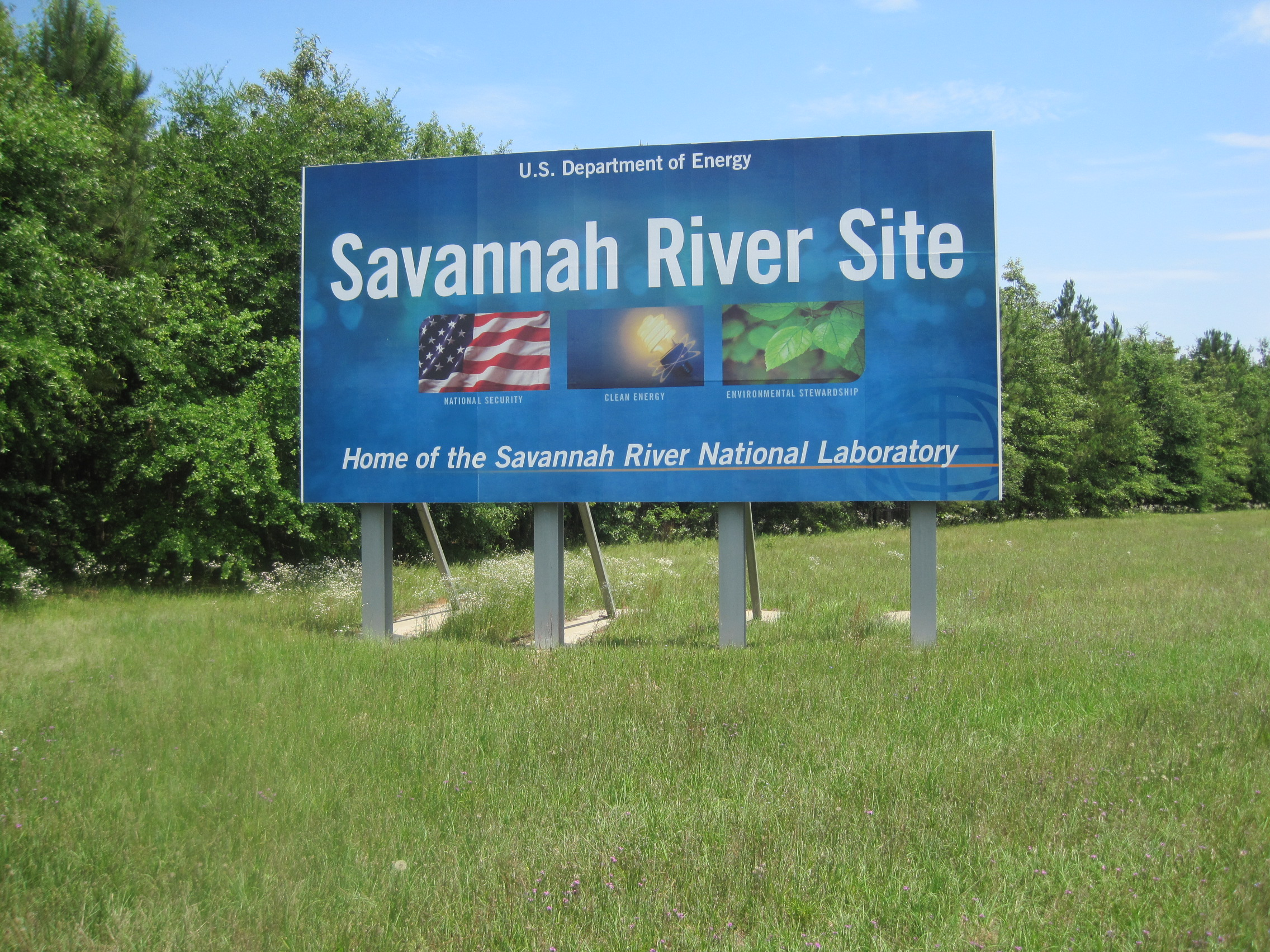
- Sign at the entrance to the Savannah River Site

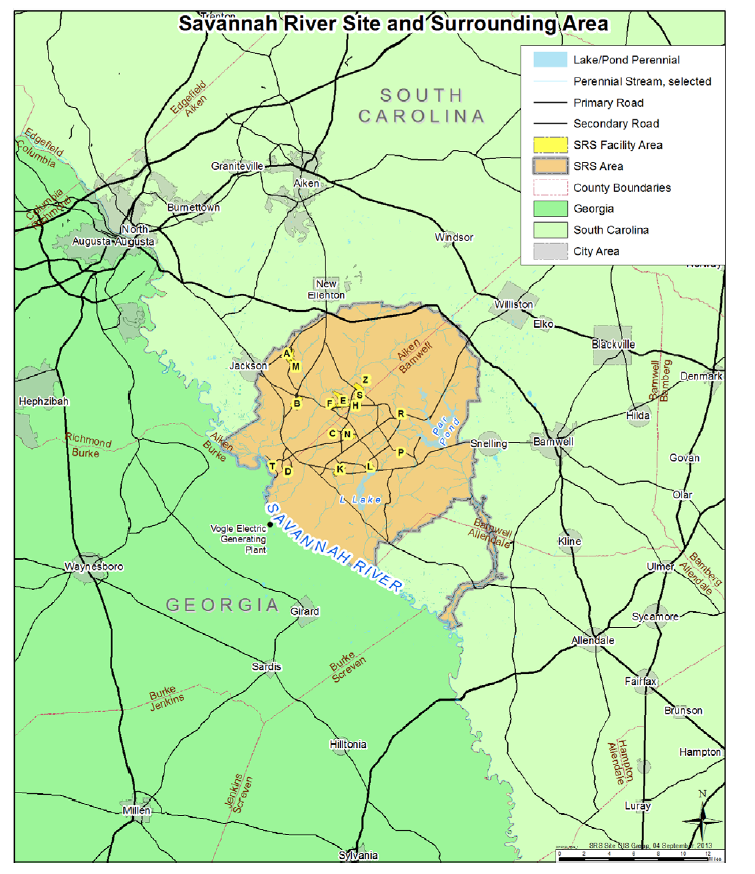
- Map of the Savannah River Site, showing the locations of the various lettered areas

Site information
- Type: Nuclear materials production and processing facilities
- Owner: Government of the United States
- Operator: United States Department of Energy
- Controlled by: National Nuclear Security Administration
- Open to the public: No
- Status: Active
- Defining authority: United States Geological Survey (For geography, ground waters, terrains and mapping)
- Website: srs.gov

Location
- Map showing location of the site Savannah River Site (the United States)
- Coordinates: 33°15′N 81°39′W
- Area: 310 sq mi (800 km^{2})

Site history
- Built: 1951
- In use: 1989–present

Test information
- Remediation: 1981–present

The Savannah River Site (SRS), formerly the Savannah River Plant, is a United States Department of Energy (DOE) industrial complex located in South Carolina, United States, on land in Aiken, Allendale and Barnwell counties adjacent to the Savannah River. It lies 25 miles (40 km) southeast of Augusta, Georgia. The site was built during the 1950s to produce plutonium and tritium for nuclear weapons. It covers 310 square miles (800 km^{2}) and employs more than 10,000 people.

The SRS is owned by the DOE. The management and operating contract is held by Savannah River Nuclear Solutions LLC (SRNS) and the Integrated Mission Completion contract by Savannah River Mission Completion (SRMC). A major focus is cleanup activities related to work done in the past for American nuclear buildup. Currently none of the reactors on-site are operating, although two of the reactor buildings are being used to consolidate and store nuclear materials.

SRS is also home to the Savannah River National Laboratory and the United States' only operating radiochemical separations facility. Its tritium facilities are the United States' sole source of tritium, an important ingredient in nuclear weapons. The United States' only mixed oxide (MOX) manufacturing plant was being built at SRS. It was intended to convert legacy weapons-grade plutonium into fuel suitable for commercial nuclear power plants, but construction was terminated in February 2019.

== Savannah River Plant ==
The Savannah River Plant (SRP) facilities were built in the 1950s on the Savannah River in Aiken and Barnwell counties South Carolina, about 20 miles (32 km) southeast of Augusta, Georgia. Their function was to produce materials used in the fabrication of nuclear weapons, primarily tritium and plutonium, by irradiating target materials with neutrons in nuclear reactors. Five heavy-water reactors were built on the site. Other facilities at the plant included two chemical separation plants, a heavy water extraction plant, a nuclear fuel and target fabrication facility and waste management facilities.

The contract to build and operate the plant was given to DuPont. The contract, which was signed on 30 September 1953, was a cost-plus-fixed-fee one, with the fee set at one dollar. Construction of the first reactor at the Savannah River Plant, R Reactor, was begun in June 1951, and was completed in July 1953, twenty-five months later. R Reactor became operational in December 1953. P, L, and K Reactors followed in February, July and October 1954, respectively, and the fifth reactor, C Reactor, went critical in February 1955. The first irradiated fuel was discharged, from R Reactor, in March 1955.

As the operators became more familiar with the reactors, they found that the power levels could be increased. C Reactor was built with twelve heat exchangers, but the others had only six due to limited supplies of heavy water and a shortage of heat exchangers. In 1956, the number of heat exchangers was increased to twelve on all five reactors, and the power output was increased from 378 MW to 2,250 MW. This in turn meant that the cooling water, which was discharged back into the Savannah River, was hotter. A 2,600-acre (1,100 ha) cooling pond, known as the P and R (or Par) Pond, was constructed in 1958 to allow water to cool before being discharged. P and R Reactors also drew on Par Pond for cooling water, thereby saving pumping costs and making more river water available to the other reactors.

Production of plutonium for defense programs ceased in 1988, and by the end of the year all five reactors had been shut down.

== Management ==
By the late 1980s, the terms of the original contract with DuPont no longer satisfied Congress. In particular, there was disatisfaction with the part of the contract that held that DuPont was not liable for damages in the event of an accident or litigation. DuPont felt that this was only fair, as the firm was operating the plant on a non-profit basis, and had accepted the contract only out of a sense of corporate patriotism, but Congress pressed for the contract to be revised. In 1987, DuPont notified the United States Department of Energy (DOE) that it would not continue to operate and manage the site when the latest extension expired in 1989.

The DOE put the contract out to tender. The Savannah River Plant would be operated for a profit of between $26 and $40 million (equivalent to between $70 and $100 million in 2025). The Price-Anderson Act provided liability protection for the operator. There were two bids: one from Westinghouse Electric with Bechtel, and one from a consortium headed by Martin Marietta with EG&G and United Engineers and Constructors. On 8 September 1988, DOE announced that the contract had been awarded to the Westinghouse Savannah River Company, a subsidiary of Westinghouse Electric created to run the SRP. Westinghouse assumed control of the SRP on 1 April 1989, and one of its first actions was to rename the facility the Savannah River Site (SRS), reflecting the fact that there were several plants on the site and the primary focus had shifted from production of nuclear weapons to other missions. Existing employees were guaranteed continued employment, and the work force grew to 22,800 and the budget to $2.2 billion in 1991 (equivalent to $5.7 billion in 2025), twice what it had been in 1989.

On the one hand, there was public pressure not to restart the reactors; on the other, there was a pressing need for tritium. A Westinghouse safety review in April 1989 found that K, L and P reactors could all be restarted, but attention was focused on K Reactor. In May 1990, Energy Secretary James D. Watkins announced that K Reactor would be restarted in December, followed by P Reactor in March 1991 and L Reactor in September 1991. South Carolina law now required that water discharged into the river be no warmer than 90 °F (32 °C). To meet this requirement, a 447-foot (136 m) cooling tower was built at a cost of $90 million (equivalent to $212.7 million in 2025).

In December 1991, one of K Reactor's heat exchangers sprung a leak and 150 pounds (68 kg) of tritiated water was released into the river. Public utilities downstream closed their inputs until the contaminated water had passed. K Reactor went critical on 8 June 1992, but only for a test run. P Reactor was shut down permanently in February 1991. L Reactor, which was on standby, was ordered to be shut down permanently without the possibility of restart in April 1993, and in November 1993, Energy Secretary Hazel R. O'Leary announced that K Reactor would not be restarted.

In 1995, DOE announced that it would seek an open selection process for the SRS contract, which was up for renewal. However, the only bid received was from the Westinghouse Savannah River Company. In addition to its partner Bechtel, Westinghouse now also brought in Babcock & Wilcox and British Nuclear Fuels. In a visit in 2004, Secretary of Energy Spencer Abraham designated the Savannah River National Laboratory (SRNL), one of twelve DOE national laboratories. In 1997, the United States and Russia entered into an agreement aimed at halting the production of weapon-grade plutonium. Under the terms of the agreement, Russia's three active plutonium-producing reactors were to be converted to eliminate their capacity to produce weapons-grade plutonium by 2000. The agreement also prohibited the United States and Russia from restarting plutonium producing reactors that had already been shut down.

The contract was to be re-bid in 2006, but the DOE extended it for 18 months to June 2008. DOE decided to issue two new contracts: one for management and operations (M&O) and one for liquid waste. Savannah River Nuclear Solutions (SRNS) – a Fluor partnership with Honeywell – and Huntington Ingalls Industries (formerly part of Northrop Grumman) – submitted a proposal in June 2007 for the new M&O Contract. On 9 January 2008, it was announced that SRNS had won the M&O contract, with a 90-day transition period commencing on 24 January 2008. Savannah River Remediation (SRR) was awarded the contract for the Liquid Waste Operations.

In 2012, the M&O contract was extended by 38 months to 2016. In 2021, DOE awarded the new Integrated Mission Completion Contract to Savannah River Mission Completion, an LLC comprising BWX Technologies, Amentum's AECOM, and Fluor. Transition from the Liquid Waste Operations contract to the Integrated Mission Completion Contract was completed in early 2022. In 2025, 13,510 people were employed on the site. As of 2020, the economic impact of SRS was estimated to be $2.2 billion per year (equivalent to $2.4 billion in 2025) in the surrounding region.

On October 28, 2026, a fire broke out at the Savannah River National Laboratory, prompting officials to declare a site area emergency at the Savannah River Site. Firefighters extinguished the fire later that day, and officials lifted the emergency declaration at 9:45 p.m. Officials reported no detectable radiological contamination outside the affected facility. One employee sustained minor injuries and was taken to a hospital. Officials temporarily restricted incoming traffic, and nearby air, rail, and river traffic were also limited. Employees not directly involved in emergency response or shutdown operations were instructed to shelter in place as a precaution.

== Environmental remediation ==
Decades of nuclear material production for defense purposes, along with the site's historical waste disposal practices, have led to significant environmental contamination, the accumulation of large quantities of nuclear waste and surplus nuclear materials requiring disposal, and the need to safely decommission numerous disused facilities. Disposal techniques, such as the use of seepage basins for liquid waste and underground tanks for high-level radioactive materials, directly contaminated soil, groundwater, and surface water. This contamination posed substantial risks to the health and safety of surrounding communities and local ecosystems. Soil contamination was particularly widespread, with over 90 acres (36 ha) in D Area affected by coal ash disposal, the burial of soil contaminated following the 1966 Palomares incident in Spain, and the presence of radioactive iodine-129 near fuel processing facilities. Furthermore, the site's location adjacent to the Savannah River, a major regional water source, presented a clear pathway for contaminants to migrate downstream, potentially impacting water quality for numerous communities and ecosystems. Consequently, recognizing these risks, the decommissioning of nuclear facilities and the environmental remediation of contaminated areas became imperative by the end of the 1980s.

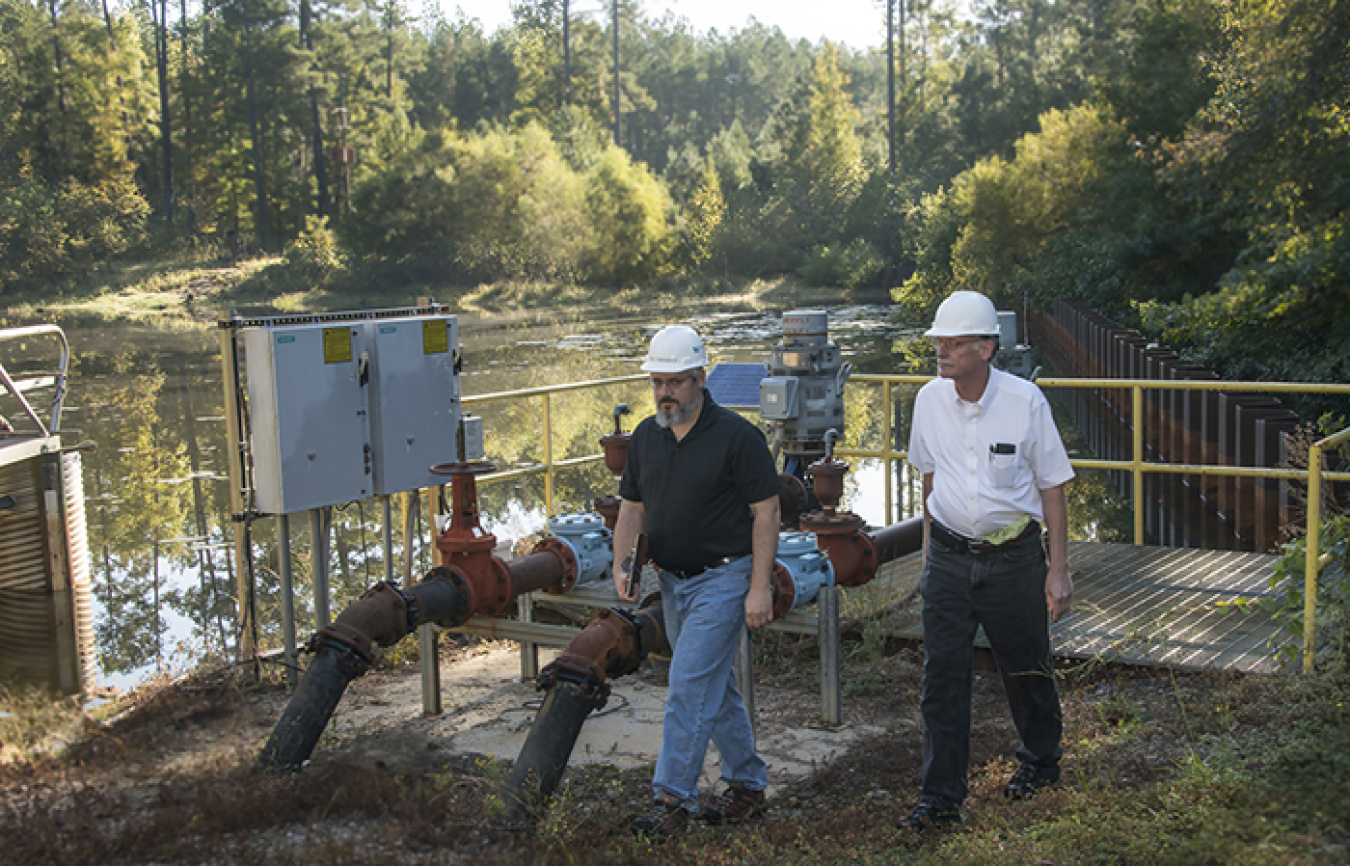
SRNS engineers George Blount and Jeff Thibault inspect equipment used to remove low-level groundwater contamination.

In 1981, environmental monitoring disclosed the presence of trichloroethylene and tetrachloroethylene in groundwater near the M Area settling basin. These were non-radioactive solvents normally used by the dry cleaning industry but employed at the SRP as a degreaser. The basin had overflowed and contaminated the surrounding area, including Lost Lake, a wetland in a shallow depression. The organic chemicals were removed from the groundwater by pumping and treating the water. Heavy sludge and contaminated soil was dumped in the M Area settling basin, which was then capped with dense clay and covered with soil and grass. The process was completed in 1991 at a cost of $5.8 million (equivalent to $13.7 million in 2025) from the Resource Conservation and Recovery Act (RCRA).

In the process, Lost Lake was drained, the vegetation and that of 160 feet (50 m) around was pulled up and burned, and the contaminated soil was replaced with soil cleaned with one of four treatments. About 150 plants of ten different species were planted around Lost Lake, which was allowed to refill, and aquatic vegetation was planted. Between 1993 and 1996, scientists from Westinghouse, the Savannah River Ecology Laboratory and the Savannah River Forest Station of the United States Forest Service observed the amphibians gradually recolonizing Lost Lake; eventually 15 of the 16 species originally present returned. An Effluent Treatment Facility began operations in October 1988 to treat low-level radioactive waste water from the F and H Area separations facilities. In 1989, the SRS was included on the National Priorities List and became a superfund site, regulated by the Environmental Protection Agency (EPA). Two years later, the mixed waste management facility, where waste containing lead and cadmium was disposed of until 1986, became the first site facility to be closed and certified under the provisions of RCRA. Construction began on a Consolidated Incineration Facility in 1993. In 1996, DWPF introduced radioactive material into a borosilicate glass vitrification process. F Canyon (Note: The chemical separations plants were known as "canyons". Two were built, one in the F Area and one in the H Area.) was restarted and began stabilizing nuclear materials.

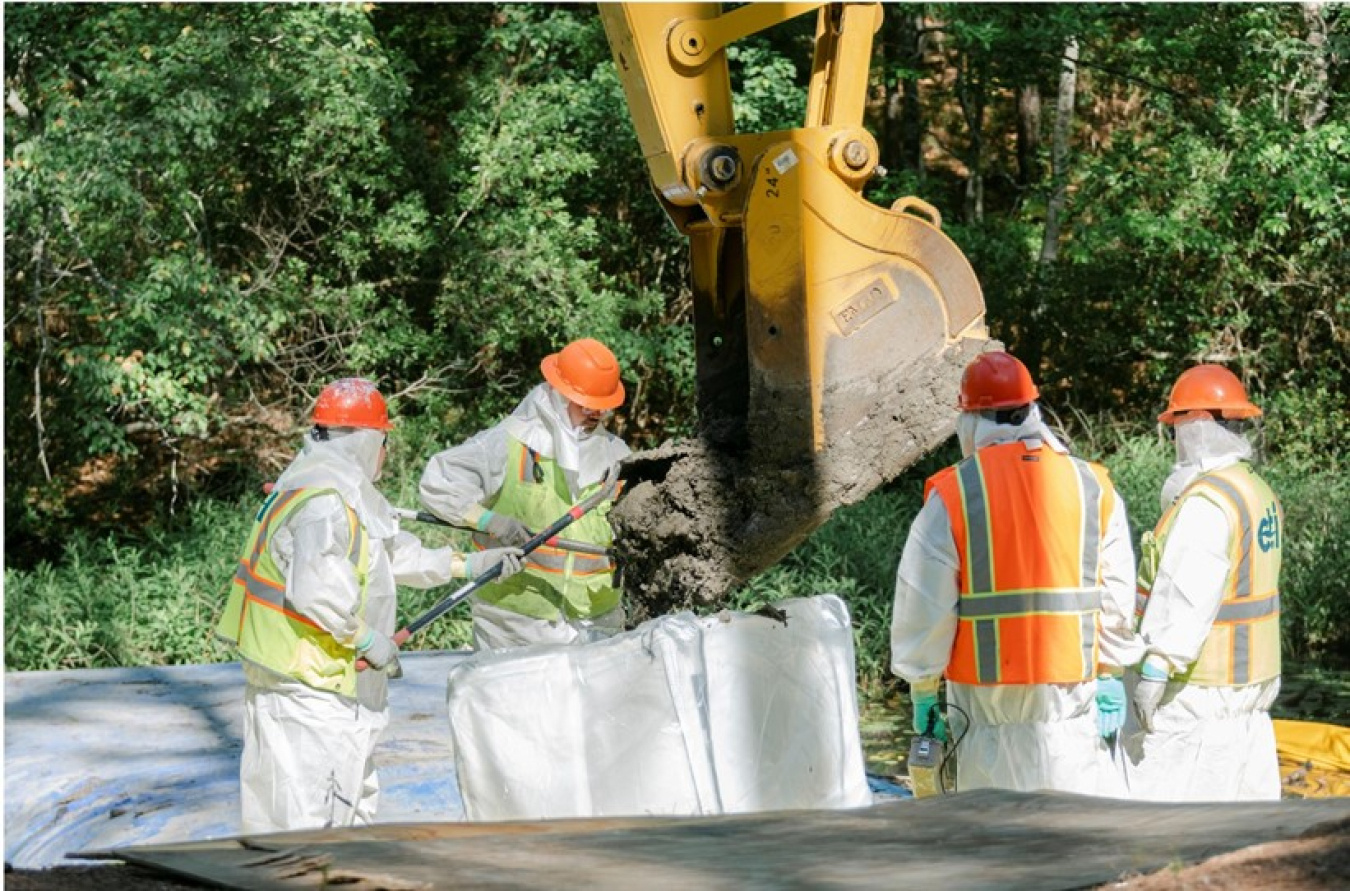
Workers place contaminated sediment from the excavation area for the Lower Three Runs project into sacks for disposal.

The first high-level radioactive waste tanks were closed in 1997, and in 2000, the K-Reactor building was converted to the K Area Materials Storage Facility. Transuranic waste was contained and sent by truck and by rail to the Department of Energy (DOE) Waste Isolation Pilot Plant (WIPP) Project in New Mexico, with the first shipments beginning in 2001. The F Canyon and FB Line facilities completed their last production run in 2002. M Area closure was completed in 2010, with the P and R Areas following in 2011. On 3 July 2025, a worker discovered a wasp nest measuring 1,667 becquerels (45,100 pCi) of beta and gamma radiation. The nest was built in F-Area, next to liquid waste storage tank 17. Subsequently, three more nests were found. The nests were sprayed to kill the wasps, then bagged as nuclear waste, though no individual wasps were ever found. The report did not say where the contamination came from, only that it was "legacy radioactive contamination not related to a loss of contamination control". It was implied that the contaminant was tritium. Because wasps only fly a few hundred feet on average from their nest over their lifetime, it was deemed unlikely that any of them left the facility. Savannah River Site Watch, a local watchdog group, was highly critical of the report, calling it "at best incomplete". It also criticized the report for not documenting the type of wasp nest, as that would help explain the source of contamination.

== Major facilities and operations ==
=== MOX fuel fabrication facility ===
In September 2000, the United States and Russia signed the Plutonium Management and Disposition Agreement. This agreement initially called for each country to dispose of 34 metric tons of surplus weapon-grade plutonium by converting it into mixed oxide fuel (MOX fuel) that can be irradiated once through in commercial nuclear power reactors or, in the case of the United States, to immobilize part of its plutonium in glass or ceramic, as well, for direct disposal in a deep geological repository. In the United States, both strategies would convert the surplus weapon-grade plutonium into forms that would meet the "Spent Fuel Standard" introduced by the National Academy of Sciences in 1994, meaning that the plutonium would be difficult to acquire and rendered unattractive for weapons use.

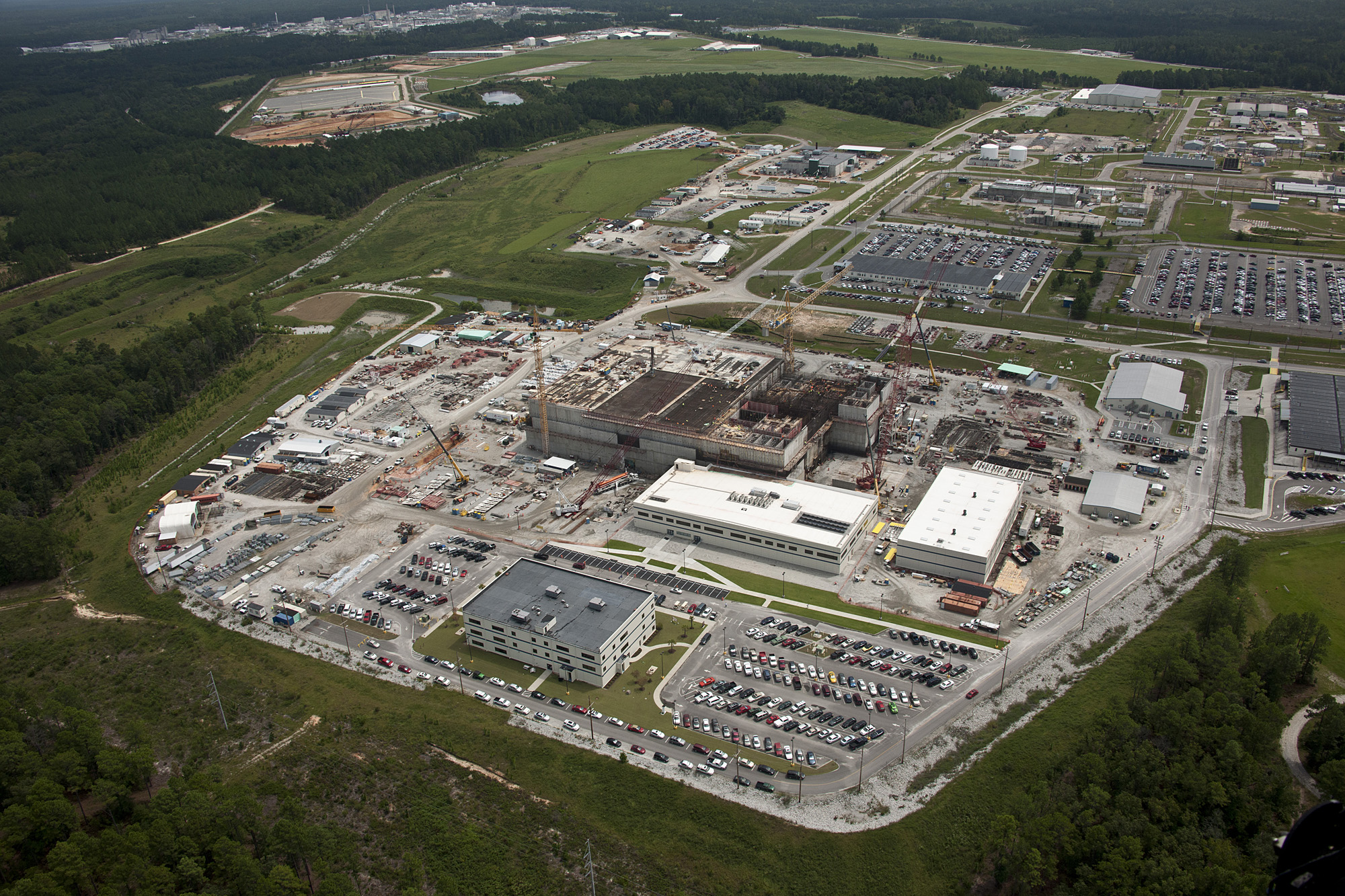
Aerial view of the NNSA Mixed Oxide (MOX) construction site in September 2012. The facility was never completed.

The Savannah River Site was selected in 2007, with operations slated to begin in 2016, as the location of three new plutonium facilities for: MOX fuel fabrication; pit disassembly and conversion; and plutonium immobilization. On 1 August 2007, construction officially began on the MOX facility, which was expected to cost $4.86 billion (equivalent to $7.55 billion in 2025). Following startup testing, the facility expected to process up to 3.5 metric tons of plutonium oxide each year.

In 2010, the agreement was amended to change the initially agreed disposition methods. Russia would instead use the MOX fuel route in its fast-neutron reactors BN-600 and BN-800. The Russian Federation met its obligations, completed its processing facility and commenced processing of plutonium into MOX fuel with experimental quantities produced in 2014 for a cost of about $200 million (equivalent to $300 million in 2025), reaching industrial capacity in 2015. The United States decided to fully committing itself to the MOX fuel route.

The cost of the Savannah River Site MOX plant quickly escalated. The initial cost estimate in 2014 was $18.6 billion (equivalent to $25 billion in 2025); within a year this had blown out to $21.3 billion and a report by the National Nuclear Security Administration (NNSA) estimated the total cost over a 20-year life cycle for the MOX plant to be $27.2 billion (equivalent to $37 billion in 2025) if the annual funding cap was increased to $500 million or $29.8 billion (equivalent to $41 billion in 2025) if it were increased to $375 million. The Obama administration and first Trump administration proposed cancelling the project, but Congress continued to fund construction.

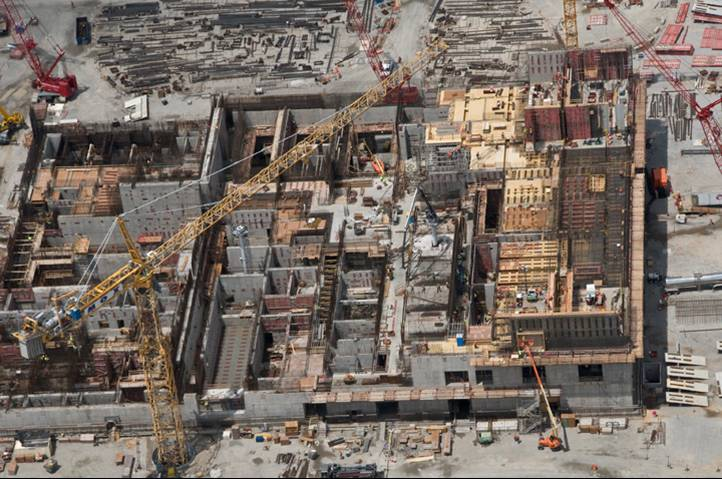
NNSA's Mixed Oxide Fuel Fabrication Facility under construction in 2010.

The Aiken Chamber of Commerce filed a lawsuit against the federal government claiming they have become a dumping ground for unprocessed weapons grade plutonium for the indefinite future and demanding previously agreed upon payment of contractual non-delivery fines. The federal government filed a motion to dismiss that was granted in February 2017. In 2018, the state of South Carolina similarly sued the federal government over the termination of the project, arguing that the DOE had not prepared an environmental impact statement concerning the unanticipated long-term storage of plutonium in the state and that the government had failed to follow the statutory provisions concerning obtaining a waiver to cease construction on the facility. In January 2019, the Fourth Circuit Court of Appeals rejected South Carolina's suit for lack of standing; in October 2019, the U.S. Supreme Court rejected the state of South Carolina's petition of certiorari, thereby allowing the lower court's ruling to stand and the federal government to terminate construction.

In May 2018, Energy Secretary Rick Perry informed Congress he had effectively ended the about 70% complete project. Perry stated that the cost of a dilute and dispose approach to the plutonium will cost less than half of the remaining lifecycle cost of the MOX plant program. Russia had suspended its implementation of the agreement in October 2016, citing delays in the United States' implementation. In February 2019, the Nuclear Regulatory Commission (NRC) granted a request to terminate the plant's construction authorization.

After six years of litigation over plutonium moved to the site, South Carolina Attorney General Alan Wilson announced on 31 August 2020 that the federal government agreed to pay the state $600 million. Wilson described this as "the single largest settlement in South Carolina's history". The federal government also agreed to remove the remaining 9.5 metric tons of plutonium stored at the site by 2037. At a town hall meeting at USC-Aiken on 20 August 2021, South Carolina Governor Henry McMaster led a discussion on how to spend $525 million of that amount.

=== Savannah River Plutonium Processing Facility ===
The unfinished MOX fuel fabrication facility was repurposed to construct the Savannah River Plutonium Processing Facility (SRPPF) to produce at least 50 war reserve plutonium pits per year at the Savannah River Site, with surge capacity to meet NNSA's requirement of 80 pits annually following a two-site strategy with SRS producing no fewer than 50 pits and Los Alamos National Laboratory no fewer than 30 pits. The dismantlement and removal of equipment installed by the MOX project was completed in June 2024. The new facility is expected to open in 2032.

=== Tritium stockpile management ===
Tritium must be replenished continually because it decays exponentially at the rate of about 5.48% per year. (Note: The first-order radioactive decay equation is N(t)=N_{0} e^{-λt}, where N(t) is the number of nuclei remaining after time t, N_{0} the initial number of nuclei and λ the decay constant. For a radioisotope with a half-life T_{1/2} of about 12.33 years, the decay constant λ is equal to ln(2)/T_{1/2}≈ 0.05621 yr^{−1}. With t=1 year, the fraction of nuclei remaining is e^{-λ×1 yr} ≈ e^{-0.05621}≈ 0.9452, representing a yearly decay of approximately 5.48%.) The SRS tritium facilities manage the stockpile by recycling tritium from decommissioned warheads and extracting tritium from target rods. At first, these rods were irradiated at SRS, but later in commercial nuclear power reactors operated by the Tennessee Valley Authority (TVA). Several production-scale methods for separation of tritium from other hydrogen isotopes were used at SRS. These included thermal diffusion (1957–1986), fractional absorption (1964–1968), cryogenic distillation (1967–2004) and, since 1994, thermal cycling absorption process (TCAP), a metal hydride based hydrogen isotope separation system.

Increasingly stringent safety and environmental requirements necessitated the replacement of facilities in operation since 1955 in order to maintain tritium production. The decision was taken in the early 1980s to build a new tritium handling facility, the Replacement Tritium Facility (RTF). The efficient TCAP process, invented in 1980s at SRS, was chosen in 1984 as the isotope separation system for the new facility. Its construction began in 1987 and became operational on 9 April 1994, replacing completely the 1950s tritium handling facilities in 2004. The modernization of the tritium facilities at SRS continued by essentially expanding RTF into the Tritium Extraction Facility (TEF) at a cost of $507 million (equivalent to $809.71 million in 2025) Construction commenced in July 2000, and the TEF commenced operations in 2006.

With the production reactors shut down, there was concern that the nuclear weapons stockpile would become inert through loss of tritium. One possibility was a new production reactor (NPR), but in November 1991 the NPR was postponed for two years due to the end of the Cold War. The following year it was postponed to 1995, and ultimately was never built. The possibility of producing tritium using a linear accelerator, an idea that had already been rejected in 1952, was considered but never implemented.

One source of tritium is recycled nuclear weapons, many of which had to be dismantled due to post-Cold War era limitations treaties and agreements. Canisters of tritium are routinely returned to the SRS for processing. Each contains three gases: tritium, deuterium, and helium-3, the decay product of tritium and a neutron poison. A 400 W laser is used to cut a tiny hole through which the heated gases escape. The gas mixture is then passed over a metal hydride bed to harvest the helium-3. The tritium and deuterium are then separated using the thermal cycling absorption process (TCAP). Another source of tritium was required, and DOE turned to the TVA. Tritium producing burnable absorber rods (TPBARs) were sent to the TVA for irradiation in its commercial Watts Bar Nuclear Plant and Sequoyah Nuclear Plant and sent subsequently for processing to the TEF at SRS.

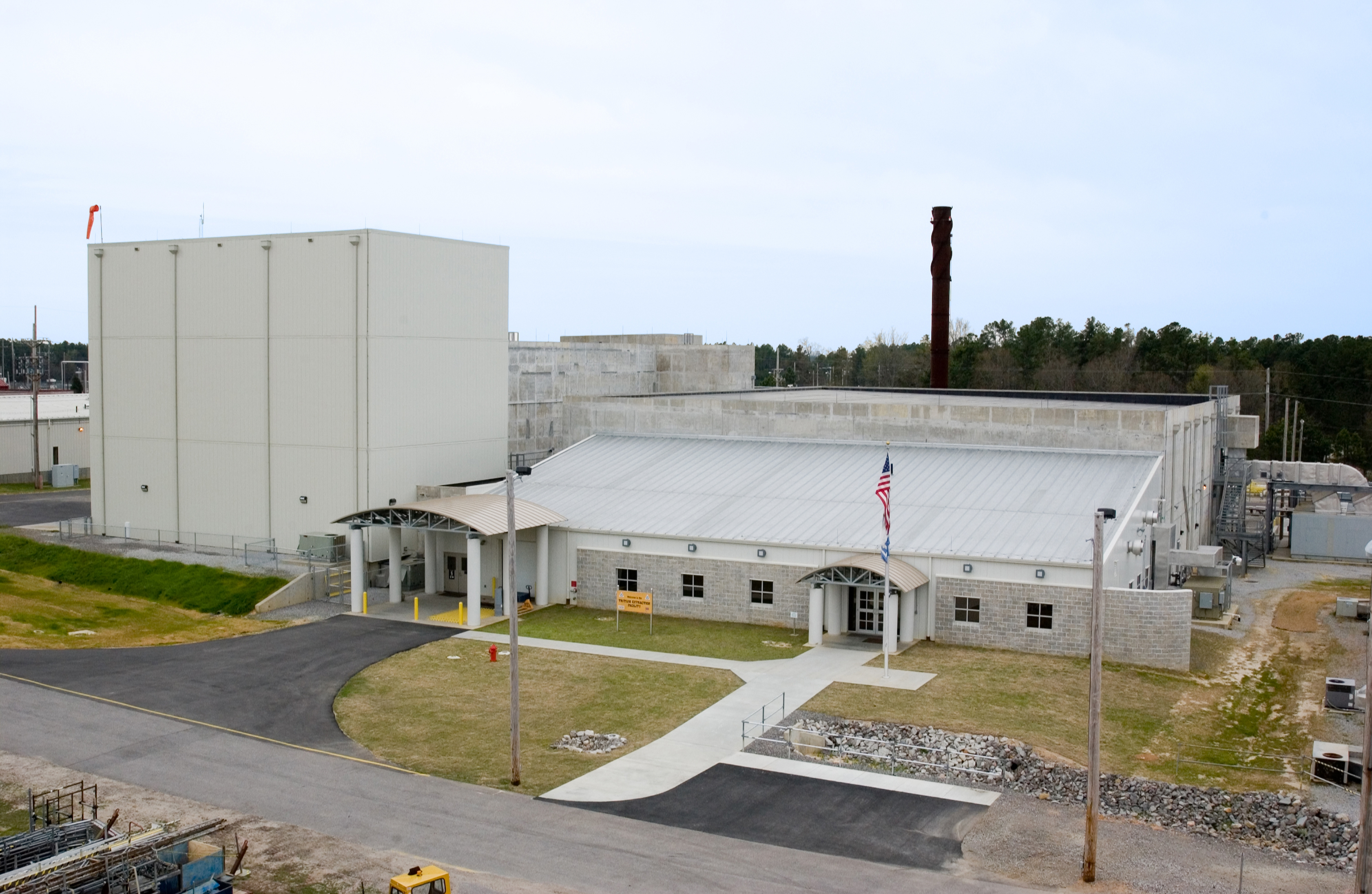
Tritium Extraction Facility

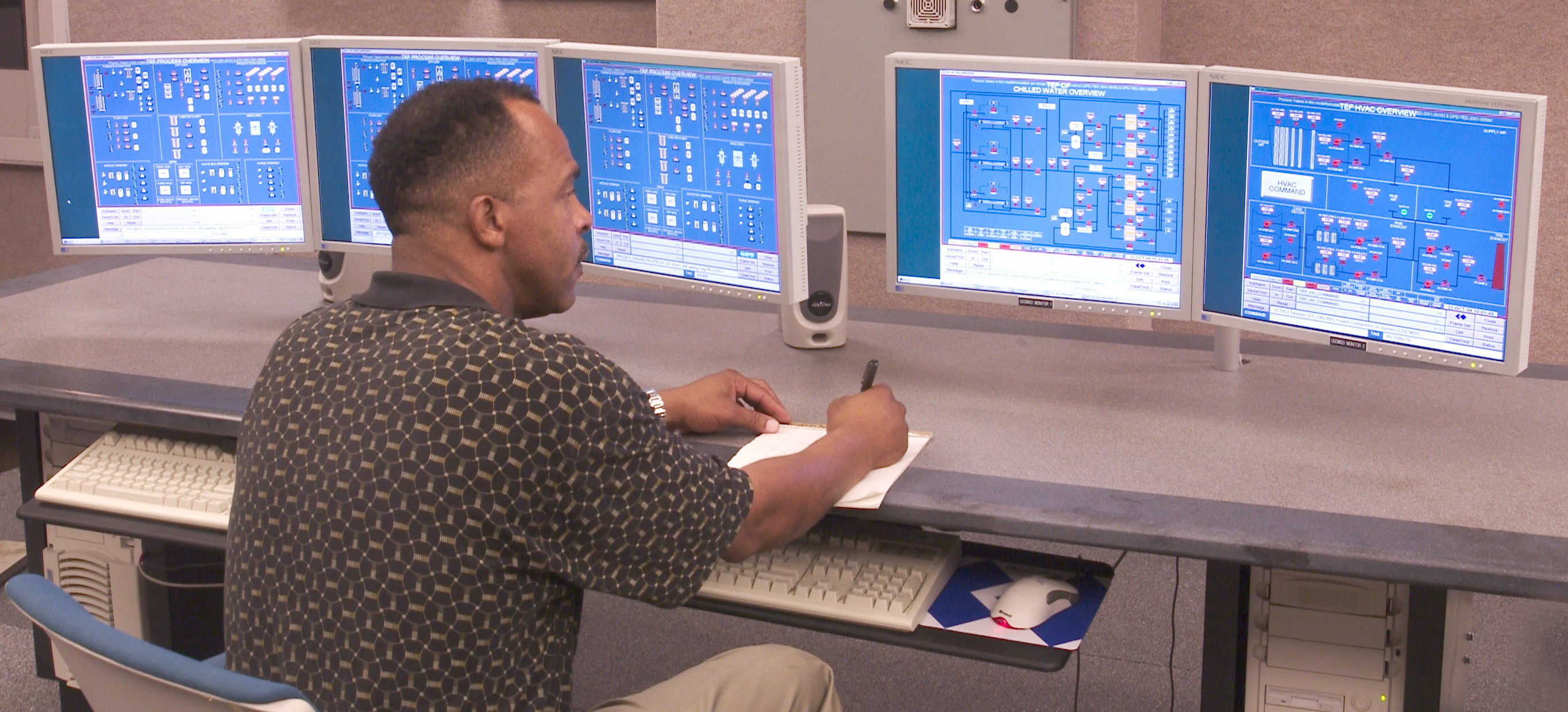
Control room

=== H Canyon nuclear materials disposition ===
H Canyon is the sole operational, industrial-scale, nuclear reprocessing facility in the United States. At the end of the Cold War, its mission shifted towards non proliferation and environmental remediation by processing and downblending weapon-grade nuclear materials, like high-enriched uranium or plutonium, for final disposition.

Spent fuel rods are dissolved in nitric acid and the chemical separation occurs in radiologically shielded facilities. It can also process spent nuclear fuel or "uranium liquid", also known as Target Residue Material, from third countries like for example, from the Chalk River Laboratories in Canada, as part of the Global Threat Reduction Initiative launched in 2004 by the National Nuclear Security Administration to expand efforts similar to the Cooperative Threat Reduction program beyond the former Soviet Union.

== Waste management and disposition ==
=== F-area and H-area tank farms ===
The production and processing of strategic materials generated about 160 million US gal (610,000 m^{3}) of liquid radioactive waste that have been concentrated by evaporation to preserve tank space to a volume estimated, in November 2005, at 36.4 million US gal (138,000,000 L). It is stored in 51 carbon-steel tanks, built between 1951 and 1981, and grouped into two tank farms in the F-area and H-area. Evaporation began at F Area in 1960, and H Area in 1963. Evaporator water, containing low levels of radioactivity, was discharged to the F and H Area seepage basins until in 1990, it was rerouted to the Saltstone Facility. As of 2025, the tanks are being emptied and decommissioned under the regulatory oversight of the Nuclear Regulatory Commission.

The legacy nuclear waste consists of approximately 2.6 million US gal (9,800,000 L) of sludge, composed primarily of insoluble metal hydroxide solids that settled at the bottom of the tanks; and approximately 33.8 million US gal (128,000,000 L) of salt waste, which is composed of concentrated soluble salt solution (supernate) and crystallized saltcake. This waste is being treated and further reduced in volume in the Salt Waste Processing Facility. The most radioactive part is sent to the DWPF for vitrification, while the remaining salt residues are grouted and sent to the Saltstone Disposal Facility for disposal.

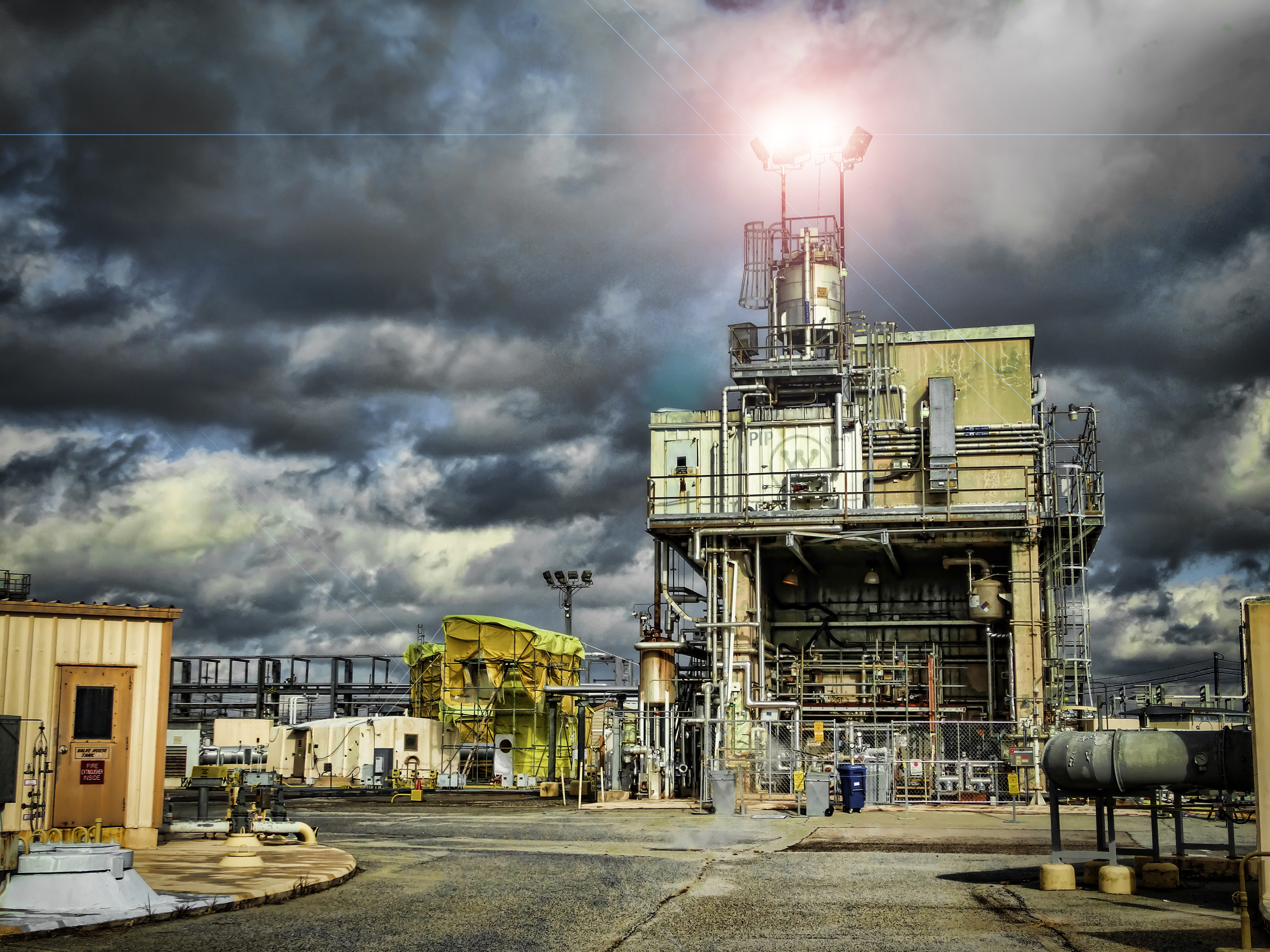
2F Evaporator taken at F-Tank Farm

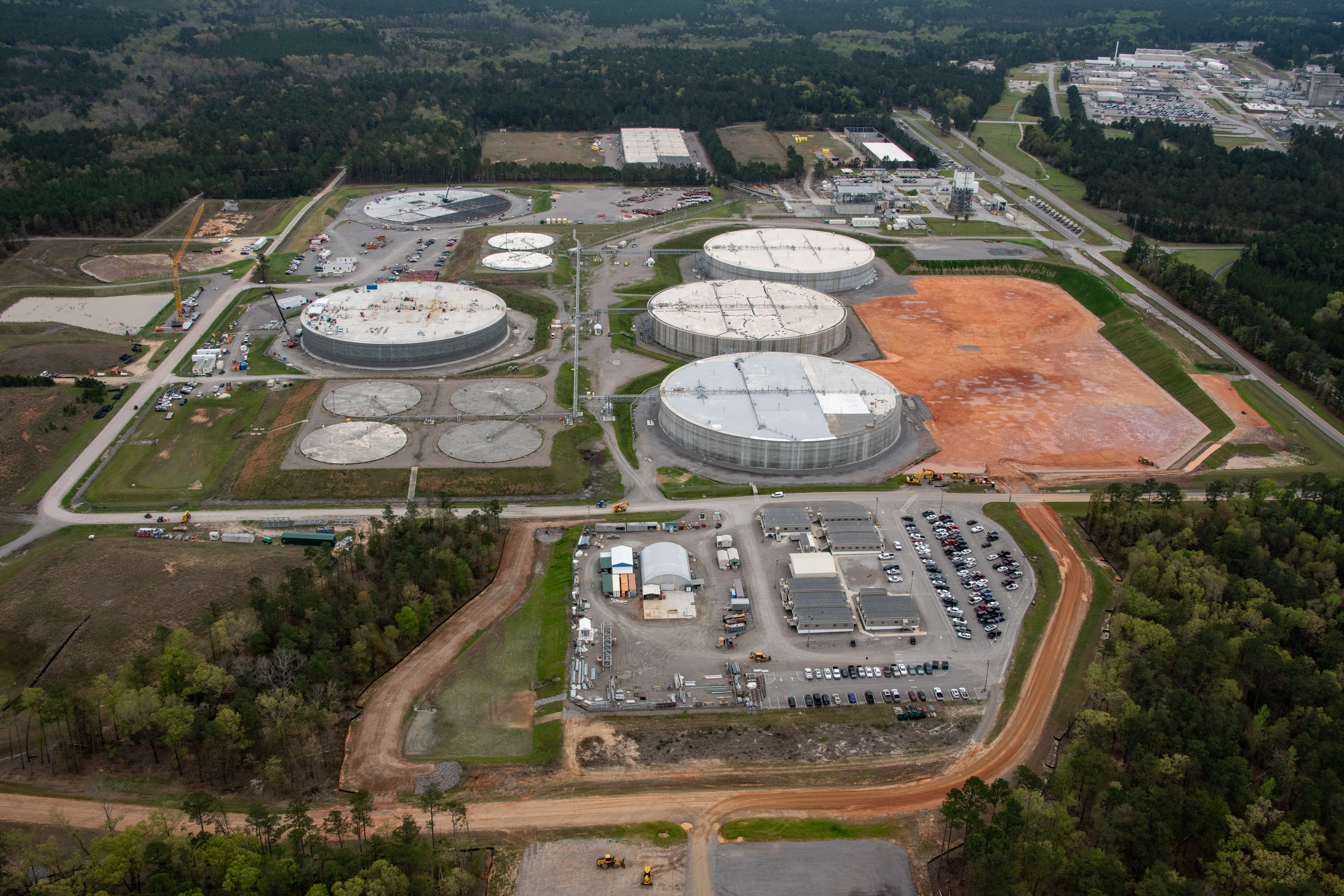
Aerial view of the Saltstone Disposal facility

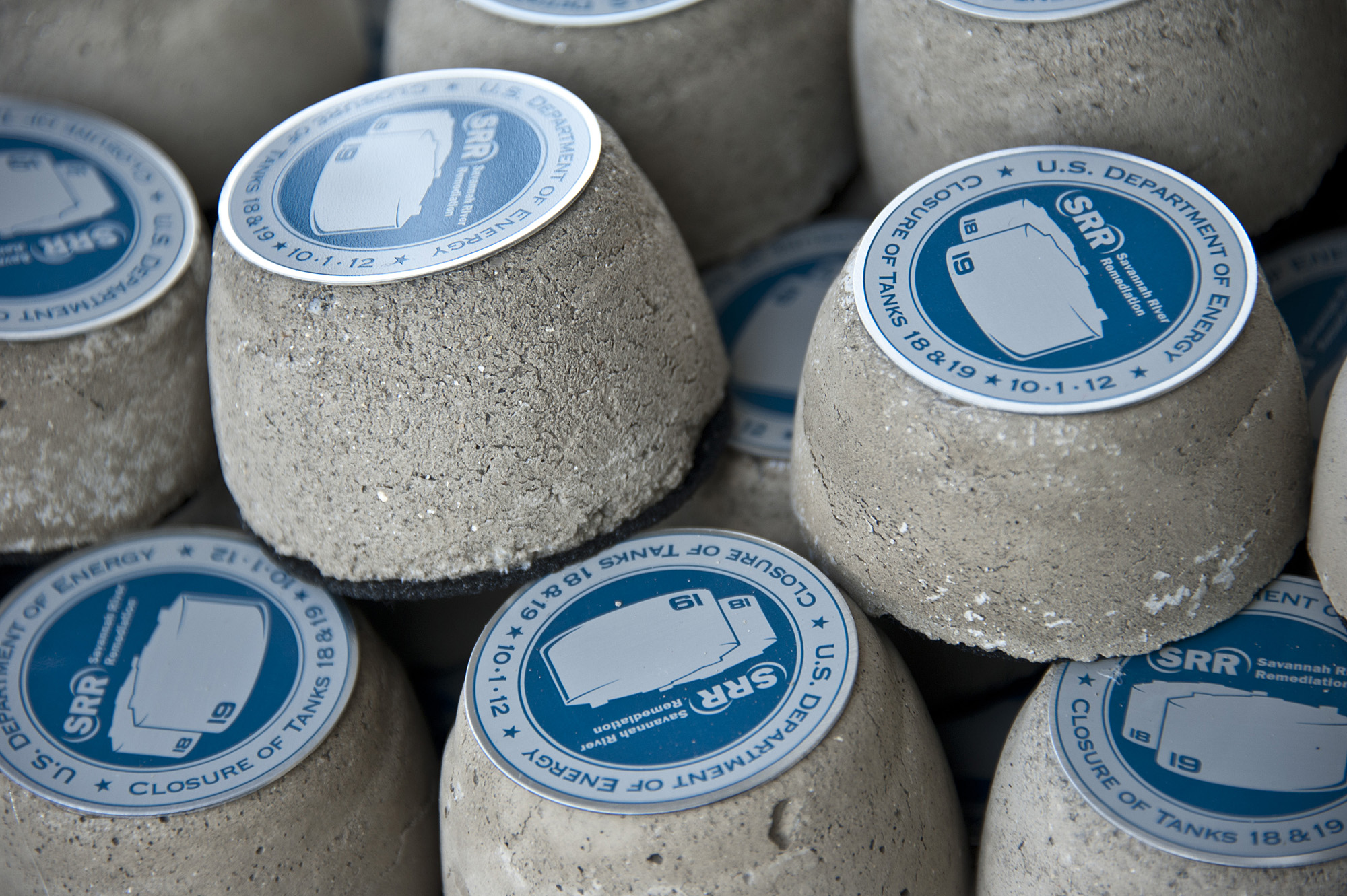
Commemorative paper weights made from the same type of grout that goes into the waste tanks

=== Defense Waste Processing Facility (DWPF) ===
In the late 1960s, the SRNL began research to find a suitable solution for the management and disposal of liquid, highly radioactive waste generated at the SRP. The first waste was vitrified on a laboratory scale in 1972. By the mid-1970s, SRP began planning and designing America's first vitrification plant to immobilize the high-level radioactive waste stored in the SRP waste tank farms in borosilicate glass. After evaluating other methods, DOE choose vitrification for the long term management option for SRP waste in 1982 and pursued the development the Defense Waste Processing Facility (DWPF).

In 1987, DOE projected the DWPF to cost an estimated $1.2 billion (equivalent to $3 billion in 2025) and to begin vitrifying waste in September 1989. By January 1992, costs had escalated up to $2.1 billion (equivalent to $5 billion in 2025) and the start of vitrification operations was scheduled for June 1994. Construction began on 4 November 1983, and the facility commenced operation in March 1996.

The highly radioactive slurry is mixed with glass-forming chemicals in a 65-short-ton (59 t) Joule-heated ceramic melter at 2,100 °F (1,150 °C). The molten borosilicate glass is poured into canisters and solidifies, thereby immobilizing the waste for thousands of years. Each canister is 10 ft (3.0 m) in height and 2 ft (0.61 m) in diameter, with an empty weight of around 1,000 lb (450 kg). The process of filling a single canister typically requires one day, after which the total weight increases to approximately 5,000 lb (2,300 kg).

To complete its vitrification of the legacy nuclear waste, DWPF is projected to produce 7,800 canisters. The canisters containing vitrified high-level nuclear waste are currently temporarily stored in two Glass Waste Storage Buildings (GWSB) until a federal repository is identified. The first, GWSB-1, started storing canisters in May 1996 with space for 2,262. This was later doubled through modifications that allowed one canister to be stored safely on top of another. A second installation, GWSB-2 commenced operation in July 2010 with a capacity of 2,340 canisters. A 2020 engineering evaluation found changes for double stacking to increase capacity to 4,680 containers to be practical at GWSB-2 as well, thereby saving the $100 million cost of a third GWSB. Work commenced on the required modifications in December 2024.

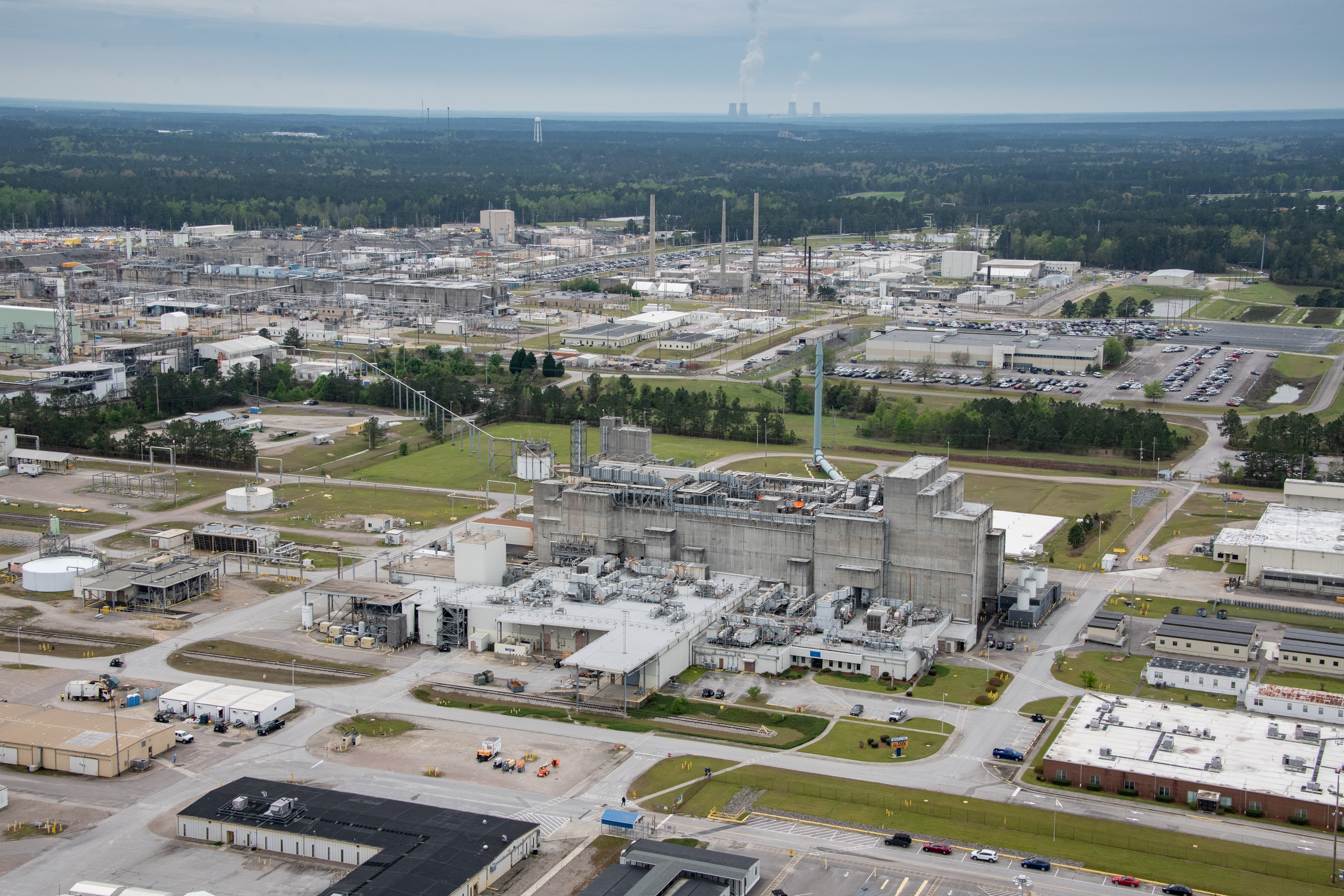
Aerial view of the Defense Waste Processing Facility (DWPF)

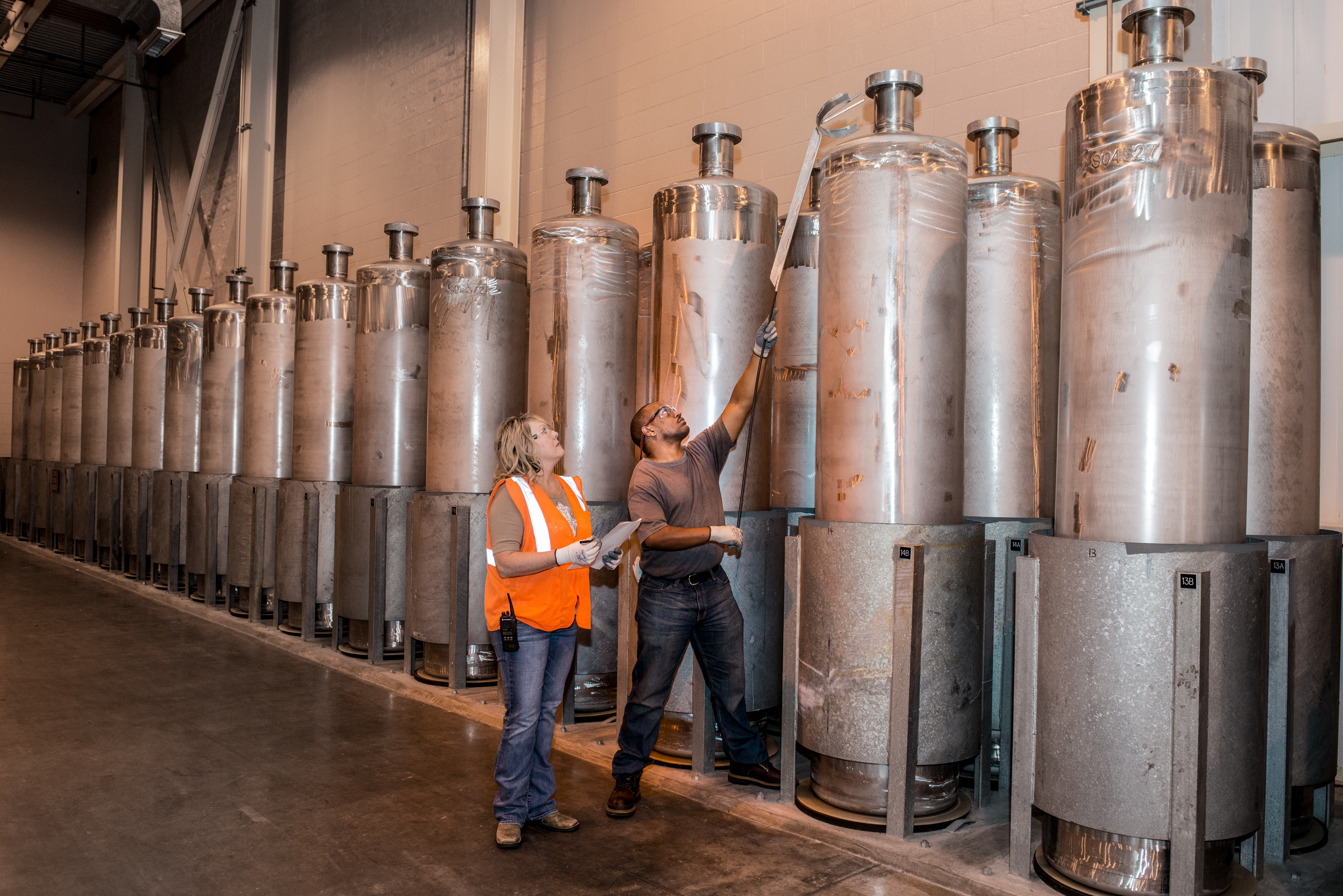
Empty canisters.

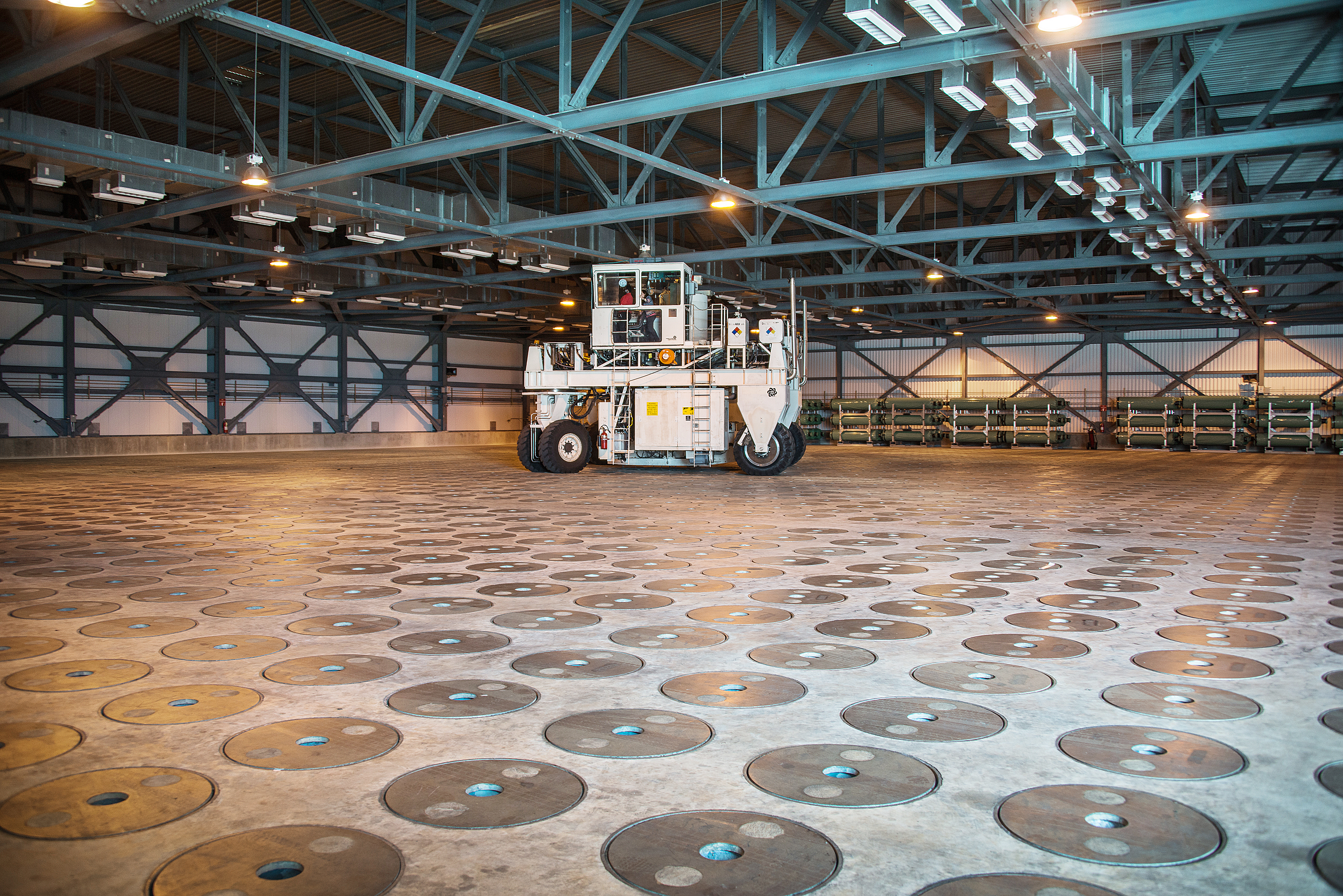
Borosilicate glass is mixed with the waste, heated in a melter until molten, and poured into stainless steel canisters (in the floor here) to harden.

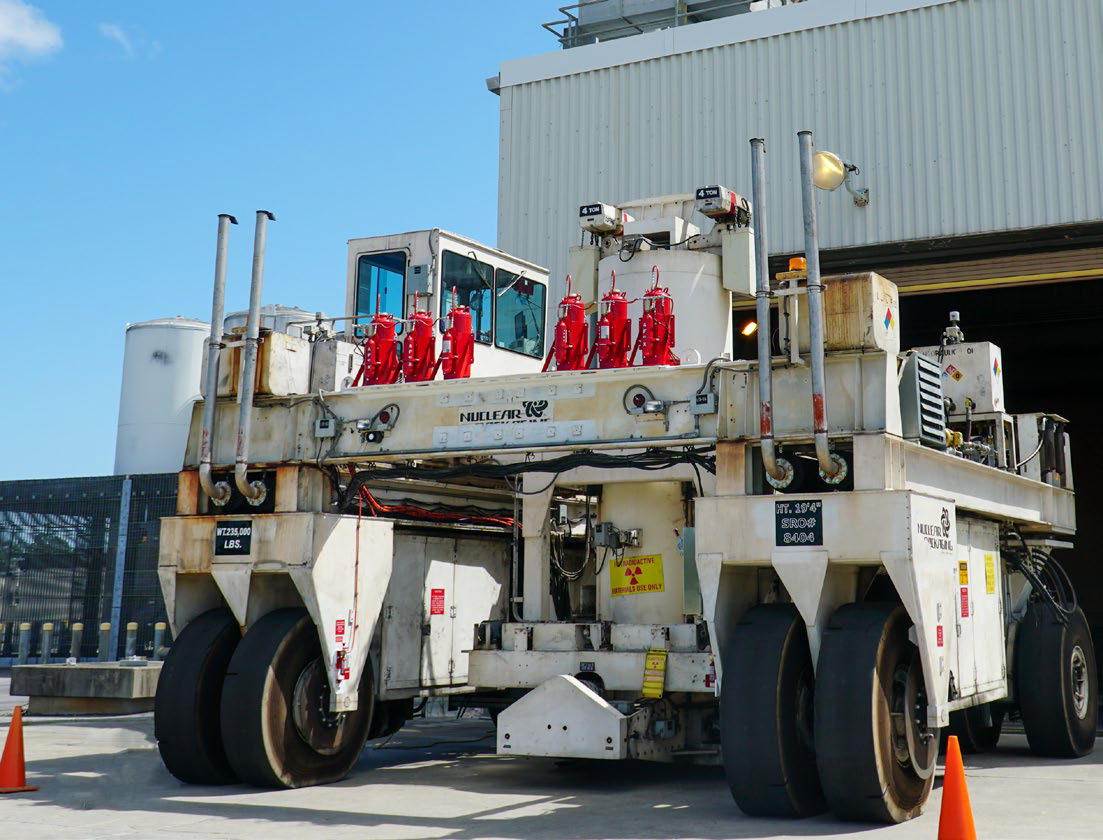
The Shielded Canister Transporter is used to move filled canisters to storage

=== Salt Waste Processing Facility (SWPF) ===
The Salt Waste Processing Facility separates and concentrates highly radioactive caesium-137, strontium-90, and selected actinides from the less radioactive salt solutions removed from the liquid legacy nuclear waste stored in large underground double walled storage tanks located in F-Area and H-Area tank farms. Initially estimated at $982.5 million in 2009 (equivalent to $1,474 million in 2025), the SWPF cost escalated in 2014 to $2.3 billion (equivalent to $3 billion in 2025). Operational since 2021, the SWPF use specific processes that have been developed at Oak Ridge National Laboratory and Argonne National Laboratory using annular centrifugal contactors. The concentrated waste is sent over, as a slurry, to the nearby DWPF for vitrification. The remainding decontaminated salt solution is sent to the nearby Saltstone Production Facility.

=== Saltstone Facility ===
The development of saltstone, a cement-based waste form for disposal of low-level radioactive salt waste, primarily sodium nitrate, started at SRS in the 1980s. The Saltstone Facility has been operational since 1990. It is located in the Z-Area approximately 6.2 miles (10.0 km) from the site boundary. It consists of the Saltstone Production Facility (SPF) and the Saltstone Disposal Facility (SDF). SPF receives and treats the salt solution from the DWPF to produce saltstone grout by mixing it with fly ash, furnace slag, and Portland cement. The saltstone grout form is pumped to large pre-constructed concrete structures at the SDF serving as final disposal units, known as Saltstone Disposal Units.

=== E Area Low-level Waste Facility (ELLWF) ===
The E Area Low-level Waste Facility (ELLWF) uses approximately 100 acres (40 ha) for active disposal operations. Most low-level radioactive waste disposed at the ELLWF is generated at various SRS facilities, although ELLWF also receives waste from the U.S. Naval Reactors program. The waste is stored in vaults and trenches. By 2010, about 7 million cu ft (200 thousand m^{3}) of low level waste had been stored at the ELLWF, representing about 40 percent of capacity, although another 100 acres (40 ha) was still available for development.

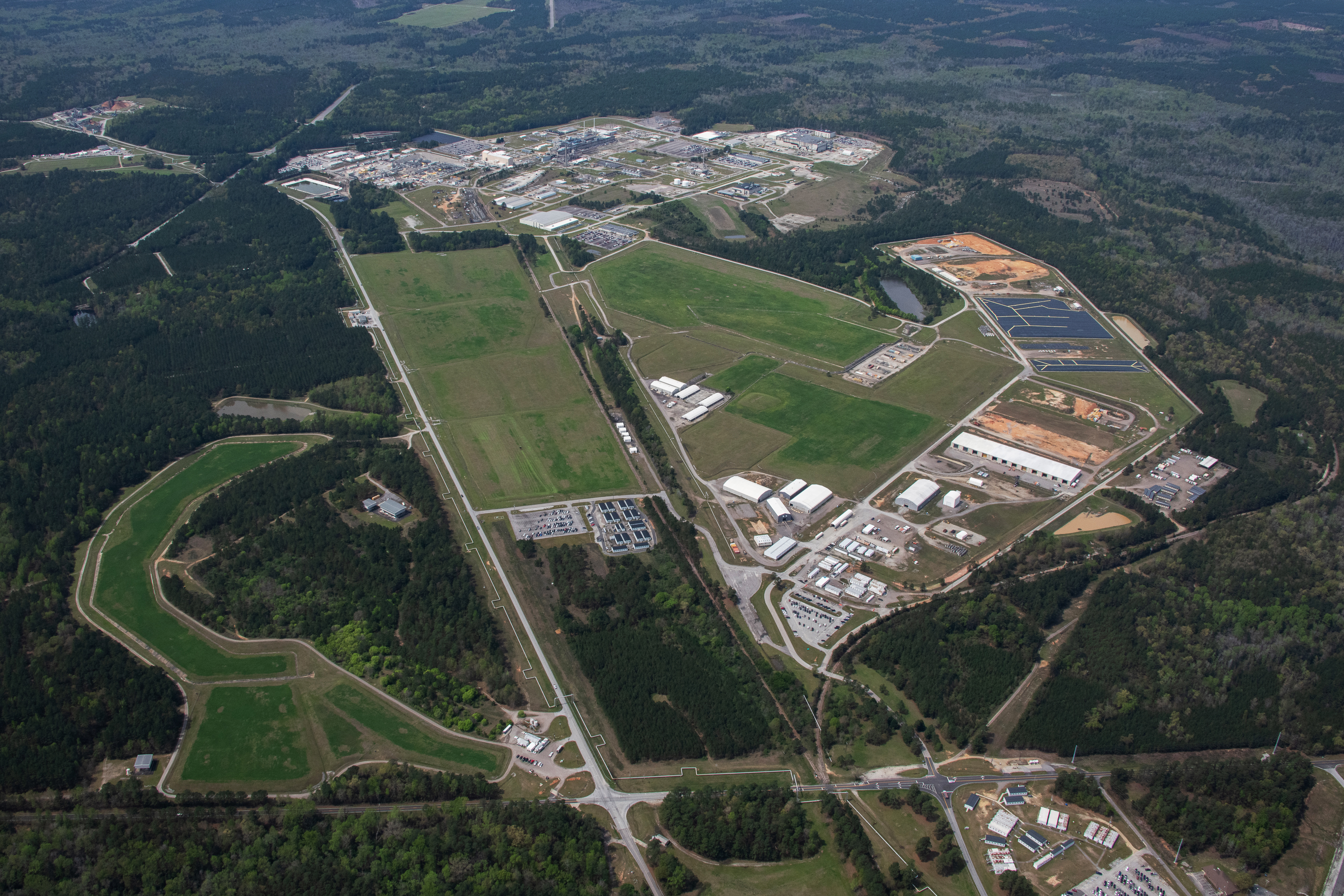
Aerial view of the E Area Burial Ground

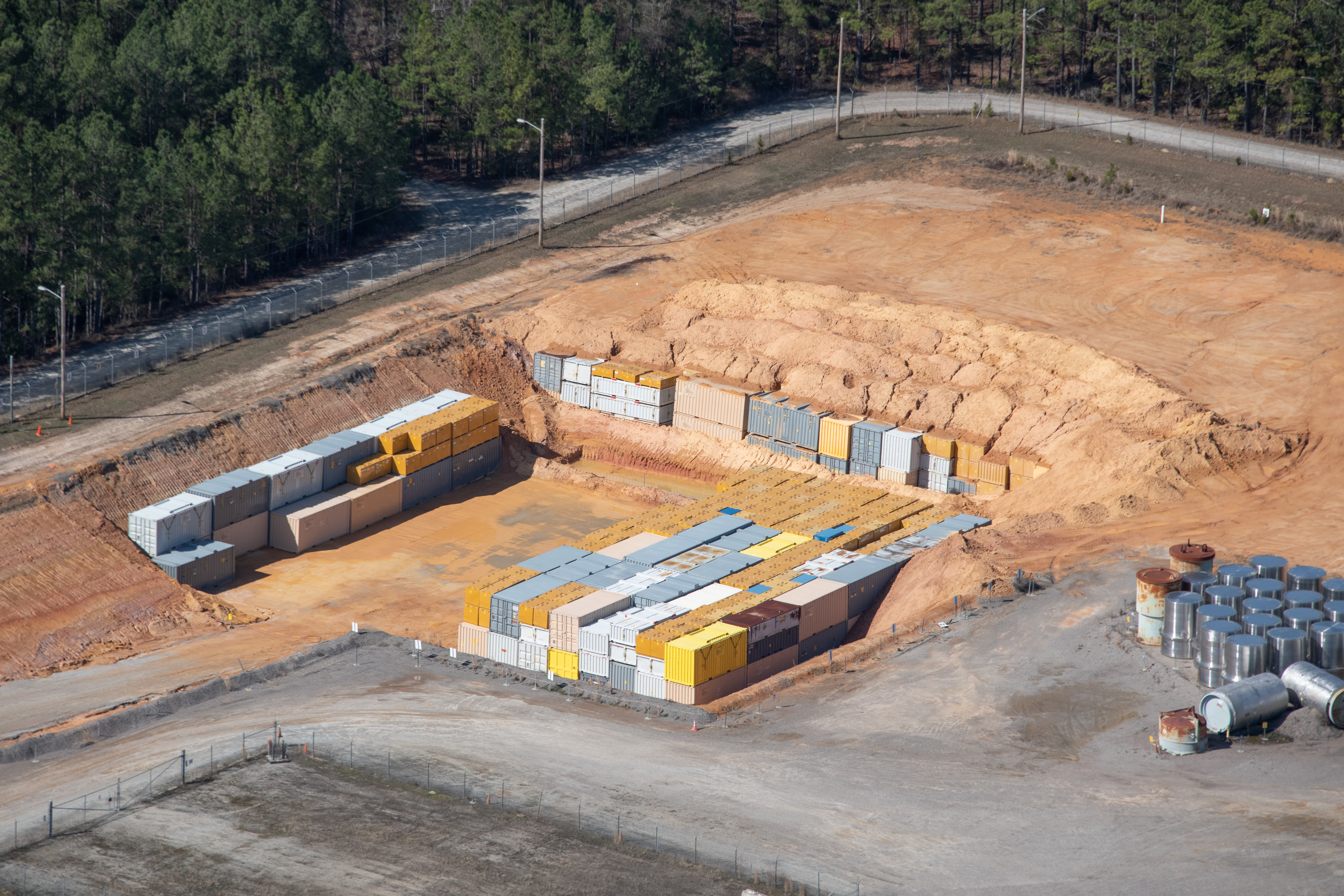
Disposition of low-level waste in the E Area

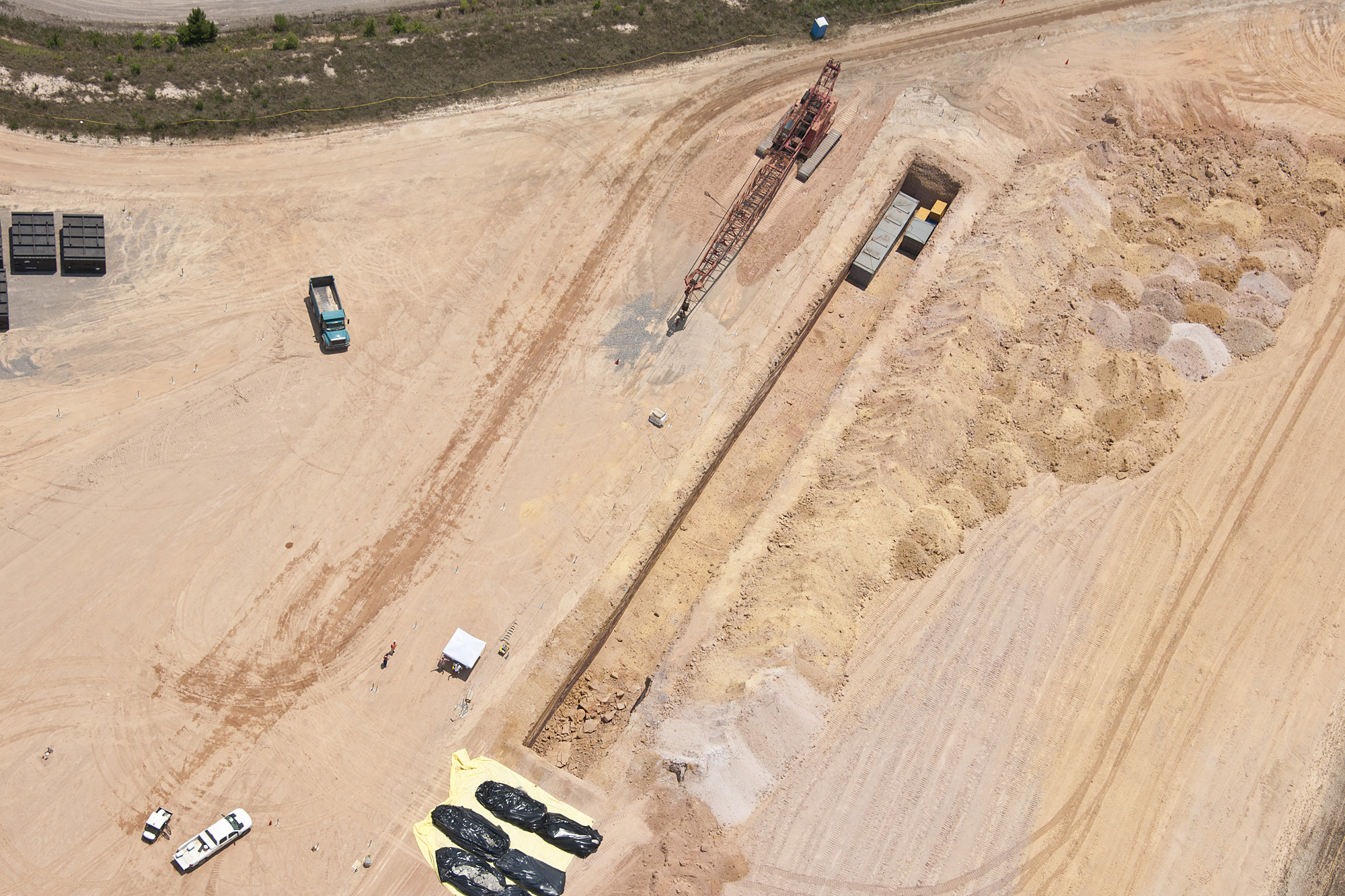
Slit trenches for the disposition of low-level waste

=== Effluent Treatment Facility (ETF) ===
The Effluent Treatment Facility (ETF) began operations in October 1988 to treat low-level radioactive waste water from the F and H Area Separations facilities. It treats low-level radioactive water originating from the separation and waste management facilities, associated laboratories, the Savannah River National Laboratory, and environmental cleanup activities. The facility removes chemical contaminants (heavy metals, organics, corrosives) and radiological contaminants (like caesium) before releasing the treated water into Upper Three Runs Creek, which flows into the Savannah River.

Constructed between January 1987 and its operational startup in October 1988 at a cost of $55 million, the ETF was engineered to meet environmental regulations under RCRA and NPDES considering that Savannah River downstream from SRS is utilized for drinking water. Its design adapted existing wastewater treatment technologies for radioactive use. The facility has a design processing capacity of 100,000 to 250,000 US gallons (380,000 to 950,000 L) per day and a maximum permitted capacity of 430,000 US gallons (1,600,000 L) per day.

=== Isotope production program ===
SRS continues to play a strategic role in recovering rare isotopes like plutonium-244 and curium from targets, irradiated from the 1960s through the 1980s in its production reactors, for fundamental research and nuclear nonproliferation research. The 65 unprocessed targets irradiated for the production of californium-252 were kept in storage at SRS for decades until their strategic value was finally recognized. These targets contain the world's supply of unseparated plutonium-244 and other heavy actinides. In 2001, this unseparated plutonium-244 was recognized as a National Resource material. The total inventory is estimated to be of about 20 grams of plutonium-244 among the 65 targets. This valuable feedstock for producing new heavier actinides are economically irreplaceable. Since 2015, the DOE is funding a program to recover the plutonium-244 and other transplutonium elements.

SRS is also the main supplier of helium-3, an important isotope of helium due to its significant role in neutron detection applications, especially following the September 11 terrorist attacks, and fundamental research. Since 2001, annual demand has far exceeded annual production in the United States and Russia, leading to a reduction of the helium-3 stockpile worldwide. Helium-3 is a valuable commodity, and sold for between $2,000 and $2,500 per liter in 2020 (equivalent to $2,000 to $3,000 in 2025). To maintain the tritium stockpile, helium-3 needs to be extracted on a daily basis and stored in pressurized cylinders at SRS. To further purify it and remove trace amounts of tritium and other impurities, these cylinders are shipped to a nuclear facility of Linde plc in New Jersey. As of February 2011, helium-3 inventory at SRS was estimated to be around 31,000 liters, with an additional yearly supply of 8,000 to 10,000 liters harvested from the tritium stockpile.

== Security ==
The 1979 Iran hostage crisis gave rise to concerns about Islamic terrorism. DuPont had always been in charge of all aspects of Savannah River Plant operations, including security, but balked at taking special measures to confront the terrorist threat. The DOE then engaged the services of Wackenhut Services Incorporated (WSI) to provide security support services at the SRP. Security was tightened around the reactors, separations area and fuel manufacturing area. On 23 August 1983, Centerra-SRS, a subsidiary of Centerra Group, assumed responsibility for security services. A paramilitary organisation, it supplies a variety of protective services. In 2017, Centerra-SRS was acquired by Constellis, continuing to operate as Centerra, a Constellis company. In January 2023, the U.S. Department of Energy awarded Centerra a new security services contract for the Savannah River Site, valued at approximately $1 billion over a potential ten-year period.

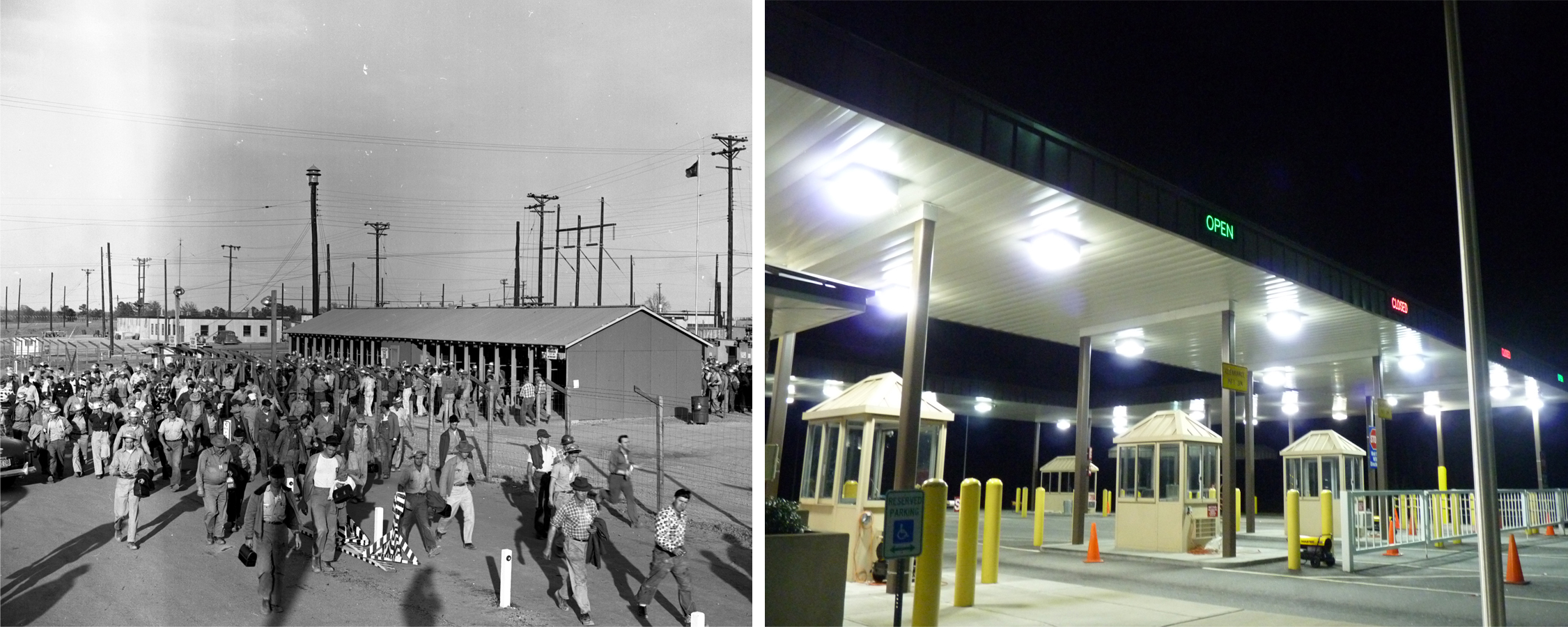
Main gate in the 1950s (left) and 2010s (right). Originally, DuPont hired and trained individuals to serve on their own security force. From 1979, the WSI-SRS Team guarded the gates.

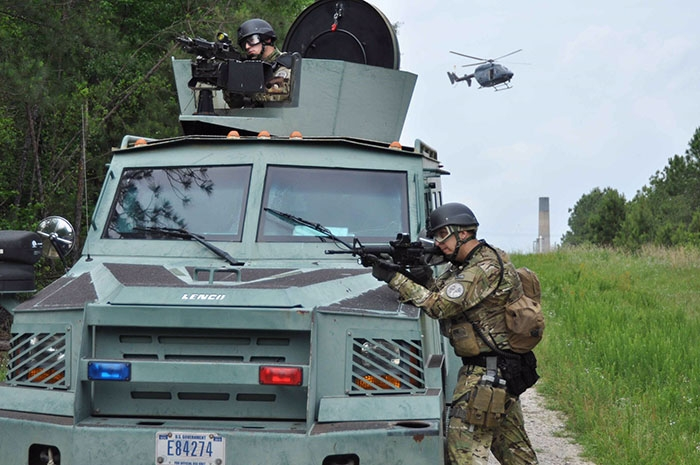
Special response team and aviation operations elements of the SRS protective force, shown here conducting a training exercise in 2016.

== Sources ==
- Carlisle, Rodney P.; Zenzen, Joan M. (2019). Supplying the Nuclear Arsenal: American Production Reactors, 1942–1992. Baltimore, Maryland: Johns Hopkins University Press. ISBN 978-1-4214-3590-9. OCLC 1325858668.
- Hewlett, Richard G.; Duncan, Francis (1969). Atomic Shield, 1947–1952 (PDF). A History of the United States Atomic Energy Commission. Vol. II. University Park, Pennsylvania: Pennsylvania State University Press. ISBN 0-520-07187-5. OCLC 3717478. Archived (PDF) from the original on 7 April 2021.
- Randall, Chris T.; Papouchado, Lou M.; Marra, Sharon L. (17 May 2000). "The Defense Waste Processing Facility, from Vision to Reality". In Reinig, Bill (ed.). 50 Years of Excellence in Science and Engineering at the Savannah River Site (PDF). Savannah River Site, Aiken, South Carolina: Westinghouse Savannah River Company. pp. 213–220. OSTI 754224. Archived (PDF) from the original on 19 August 2024.
- Reed, Mary Beth; Swanson, Mark T.; Gaither, Steven; Joseph, J. W.; Henry, William R. (2002). Strack, Barbara Smith (ed.). Savannah River Site at Fifty (PDF). Washington, D.C.: Department of Energy. ISBN 978-0-16-067182-1. OCLC 50648911. Archived (PDF) from the original on 24 May 2025.
- Reed, Mary Beth (24 March 2010). Reactor on – Thematic Study of Savannah River's Five Reactor Area (PDF) (Report). Savannah River Site Cold War Historic Property Documentation. Stone Mountain, Georgia: New South Associates. Technical Report 1743. Archived (PDF) from the original on 4 November 2023.
- Wike, Lynn D.; Martin, F. Douglas; Gladden, John B. (17 May 2000). "Lost Lake Found—Restoration of a Carolina Bay Wetland". In Reinig, Bill (ed.). 50 Years of Excellence in Science and Engineering at the Savannah River Site (PDF). Savannah River Site, Aiken, South Carolina: Westinghouse Savannah River Company. pp. 303–308. OSTI 754224. Archived (PDF) from the original on 19 August 2024.
