= BN-Reactor =

Coordinates: 56.8416°N 61.3224°E

The BN-reactor is a type of sodium-cooled fast breeder reactor built in Russia from the company OKBM Afrikantov. Two BN-reactors are to date (2015) the only commercial fast breeder reactors in operation worldwide.

== BN-350 ==
The BN-350 is the first prototype of the series, in operation between 1973 and 1999 for electricity production (150MW) and desalination.

== BN-600 ==
The BN-600 is a commercial reactor with 600MW electrical power. In operation since 1980 with an availability factor of over 74% it is together with Phénix one of the most successful fast breeder reactors ever built.

== BN-800 ==
The BN-800 is the newest reactor of this type, with a planned electrical output of 880MW. It became first critical in 2015, electricity production was planned starting in 2017, but began in December 2015.

== BN-1200 ==
The BN-1200 is a 1200MW reactor project planned to reach the safety and efficiency goals of the Generation IV.

== See also ==
- Generation IV reactor
- BN-350 reactor
- BN-600 reactor
- BN-800 reactor
- BN-1200 reactor
