= PMDA =

PMDA may refer to:

- Pharmaceuticals and Medical Devices Agency, a Japanese governmental organization, similar in function to the Food and Drug Administration (FDA) in the US
- Plutonium Management and Disposition Agreement, an agreement between the United States and Russia signed in 2000
- Pyromellitic dianhydride, an organic compound (an Isobenzofuran)
