= Beloyarsk Nuclear Power Station =

Nuclear power station in Russia

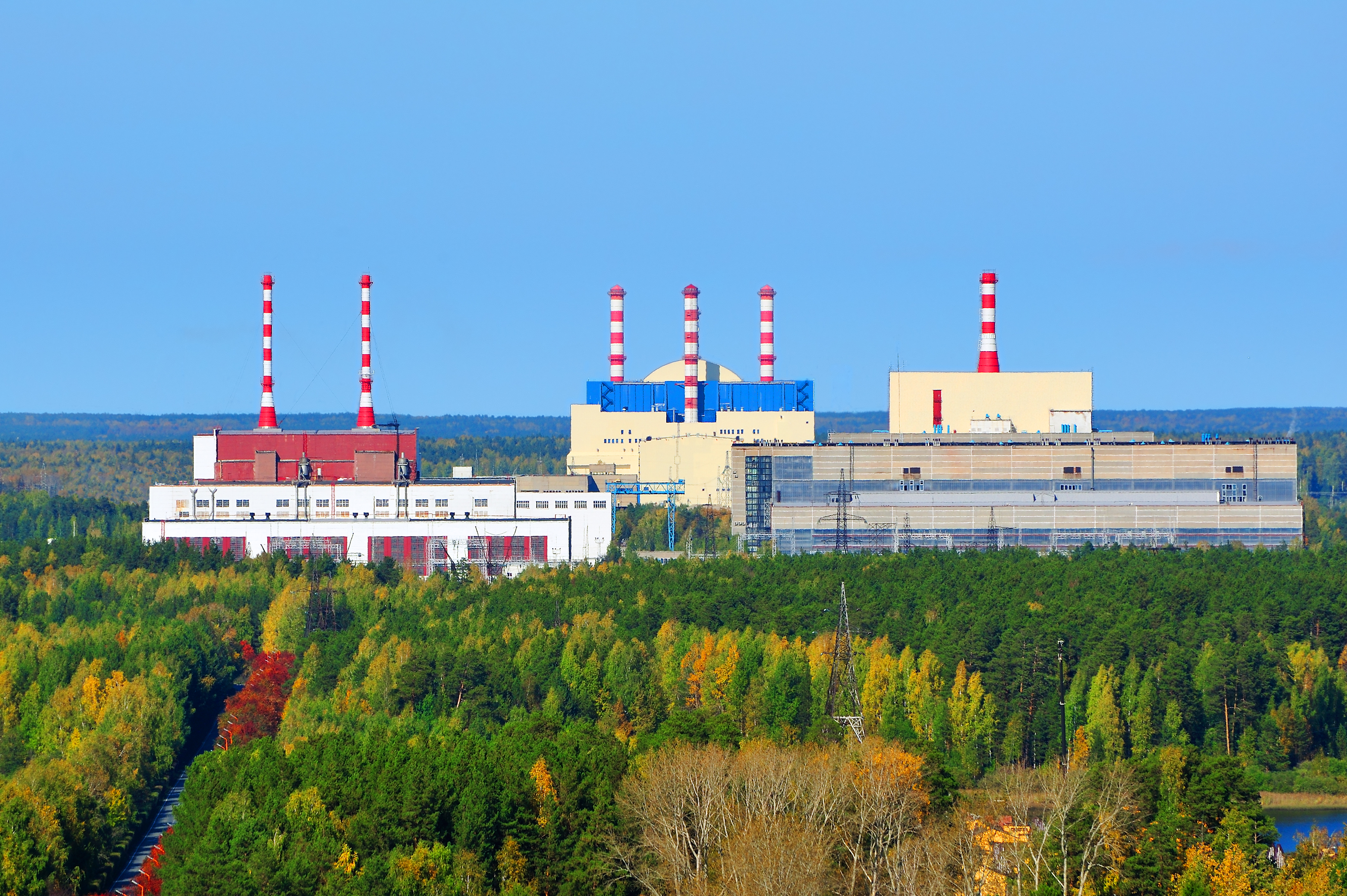
- The Beloyarsk Nuclear Power Plant
- Official name: Белоярская АЭС
- Country: Russia
- Coordinates: 56°50′30″N 61°19′21″E
- Status: Operational
- Construction began: 1958
- Commission date: 26 April 1964
- Decommission date: Unit 1 1983, Unit 2 1989
- Owner: Rosenergoatom
- Operator: Rosenergoatom

Nuclear power station
- Reactor type: Units 1 AMB 100, Unit 2 AMB 200 (LWGR), Units 3 and 4 SBR
- Reactor supplier: OKBM Afrikantov
- Cooling source: Pyshma River

Power generation
- Units operational: 1 × 600 MW (Unit 3); 1 × 885 MW (Unit 4)
- Units planned: 1 × 1220 MW
- Units decommissioned: 1 × 108 MW (Unit 1); 1 × 160 MW (Unit 2)
- Nameplate capacity: 1485 MW
- Annual net output: 10,100 GW·h

External links
- Website: www.rosenergoatom.ru/en/npp/beloyarsk-npp/
- Commons: Related media on Commons

The Beloyarsk Nuclear Power Station (NPS; Russian: Белоярская атомная электростанция им. И. В. Курчатова []) was the third of the Soviet Union's nuclear plants. It is situated by Zarechny in Sverdlovsk Oblast, Russia. Zarechny township was created to service the station, which is named after the Beloyarsky District. The closest city is Yekaterinburg.

== Early reactors ==
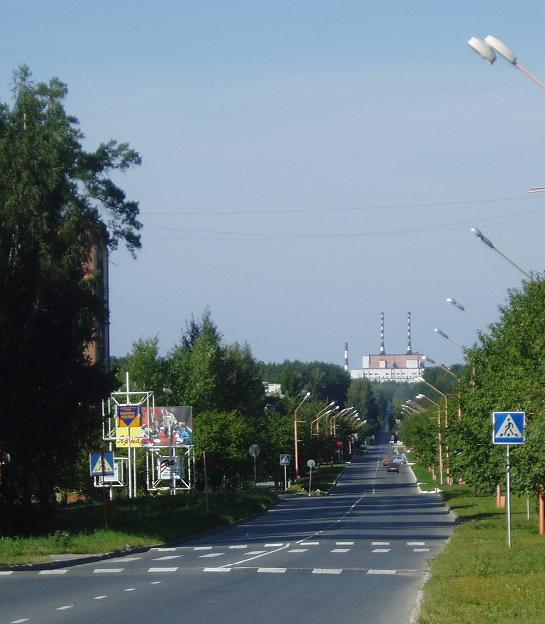
Units 1 and 2

Two earlier reactors were constructed at Beloyarsk: an AMB-100 reactor (operational 1964–1983) and an AMB-200 reactor (operational 1967–1989).

The first unit used 67 tons of uranium enriched to 1.8%, while the second unit used 50 tons of uranium enriched to 3.0%. The first unit had an indirect steam cycle, while the second had a direct one.

Although they were comparable in power to the Shippingport Atomic Power Station, the Soviet planners regarded the Beloyarsk reactors as prototypes. Their main novelty was the use of superheated steam ran through a standard turbine thus resulting in a better efficiency compared to the earlier Obninsk pilot plant. The first Beloyarsk unit produced about 285 MW heat of which about 100 MW were converted to electricity. The second unit, which used two turbines, had a similar conversion efficiency of about 36%.

== Later reactors ==
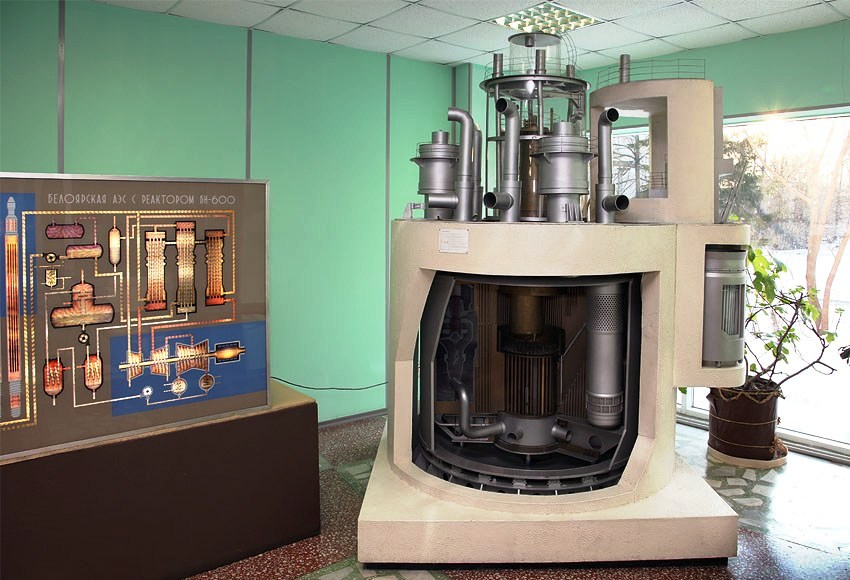
Cutaway model of the BN-600 reactor

Two reactors are now in operation: a BN-600 fast breeder reactor, generating 600 MWe gross and a BN-800 fast breeder reactor, generating 885 MWe gross. The BN-800 is the largest fast neutron power reactor in service in the world. Three turbines are connected to the BN-600 reactor. The BN-600 reactor core is 1.03 metres (41 in) tall and has a diameter of 2.05 metres (81 in). It has 369 fuel assemblies, each consisting of 127 fuel rods with an enrichment of 17–26% ^{235}U. In comparison, typical enrichment in other Russian reactors is in the range of 3–4% ^{235}U. BN-600 reactors use liquid sodium as a coolant. The station lacks a containment building.

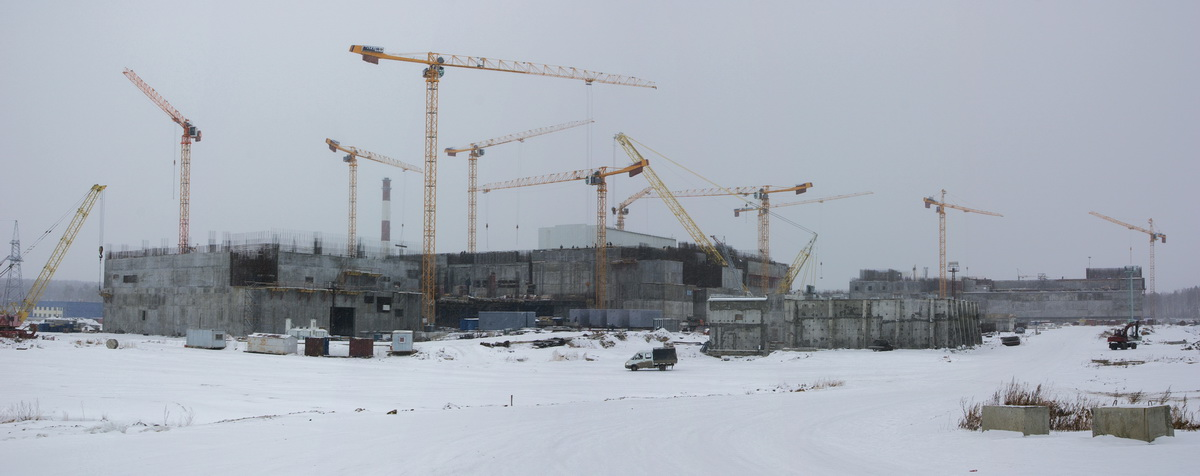
Construction of the BN-800 reactor

Construction started on the larger BN-800 fast breeder reactor in 1987. Protests halted progress in 1988, but work resumed in 1992 following an order by President Boris Yeltsin. Financial difficulties resulted in slow progress. Construction costs have been estimated at 1 trillion rubles and the new reactor was expected to be finished in 2012–2015. The BN-600, which began operating in 1980, was originally planned to be decommissioned in 2010, but has been life-extended to 2040.

On 27 June 2014, controlled nuclear fission started in the BN-800 fast breeder reactor. The newest reactor helps to close the nuclear fuel cycle and to achieve a fuel cycle without or with less nuclear waste. Russia was, at the date, the only country that operates fast neutron reactors for energy production. However issues detected during low power operation required further fuel development work. On 31 July 2015, the unit again achieved minimum controlled power again, at 0.13% of rated power. Commercial operations are expected to start before the end of 2016, now with a power rating of 789 MWe. In December 2015, Unit 4 was connected to the national grid.

Unit	Type	El. Output (MW)	Start of project	First criticality	Shut down
1	AMB-100	108	1958-06-01	1964-04-26	1983-01-01
2	AMB-200	160	1962-01-01	1967-12-29	1990-01-01
3	BN-600	600	1969-01-01	1980-04-08	2040 est.
4	BN-800	885	1987	2014-06-27	2056 est.
5	BN-1200	1,220	2027 est.	2035 est.	

== See also ==
- Nuclear power in Russia
