= BN-1200 reactor =

Fast breeder nuclear reactor under development in Russia

BN-1200
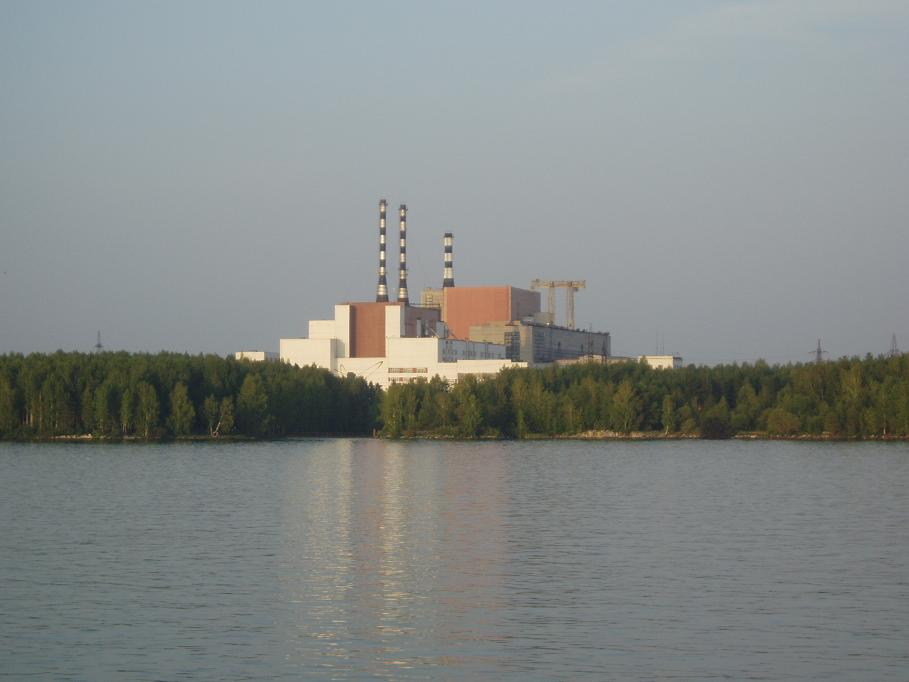
- Generation: Generation IV
- Reactor concept: Fast breeder reactor
- Status: preparation stage for construction
- Location: Zarechny, Sverdlovsk Oblast

Main parameters of the reactor core
- Fuel (fissile material): U+Pu nitride fuel
- Neutron energy spectrum: Fast
- Primary coolant: Liquid sodium

Reactor usage
- Power (thermal): 2900 MW_{th}
- Power (electric): 1220 MW_{e} gross

The BN-1200 reactor is a sodium-cooled fast breeder reactor project, under development by OKBM Afrikantov at Beloyarsk Nuclear Power Station in Zarechny, Russia. The BN-1200 is based on the earlier BN-600 and especially BN-800, with which it shares a number of features. The reactor's name comes from its electrical output, nominally 1220 MWe.

The initial BN-1200 project was rejected in 2015 due to the lack of competitive advantage in the market (vs the usual PWR type reactors). By 2024 the design was updated to get it more competitive and now it is called BN-1200M. Since 2022 the rising prices of uranium have made sodium-cooled fast reactors even more attractive.

== Background ==
Fast reactors of the BN series use a core running on enriched fuels including highly (80%) or medium (20%) enriched uranium or plutonium. This design produces many neutrons that escape the core area. These neutrons create additional reactions in a "blanket" of material, normally natural or depleted uranium or thorium, where new plutonium- or ^{233}U, respectively, atoms are formed. These atoms have distinct chemical behavior and can be extracted from the blanket through reprocessing. The resulting plutonium metal can then be mixed with other fuels and used in conventional reactor designs.

For the breeding reaction to produce more fuel than it uses, neutrons released from the core must retain significant energy. Additionally, as the core is very compact, the heating loads are high. These requirements led to the use of a liquid sodium coolant, as this is an excellent conductor of heat, and is largely transparent to neutrons. Sodium is highly reactive, and careful design is needed to build a primary cooling loop that can operate safely. Alternate designs use lead.

Although the plutonium produced by breeders is useful for weapons, more traditional designs, notably the graphite-moderated reactor, generate plutonium more easily. However, these designs deliberately operate at low energy levels for safety reasons, and are not economic for power generation. The breeder's ability to produce more new fuel than was spent while also producing electricity makes it economically interesting (it uses 99% of uranium energy, instead of 1%). However, to date the low cost of uranium fuel has made this unattractive, as it is four times cheaper than the BN600.

== History ==
=== Previous designs ===
The government began experiments with breeders in the 1960s. In 1973, the first prototype of a power-producing reactor was constructed, the BN-350 reactor, which operated until 1999.

BN-600 reactor is a pool type LMFBR reactor which went into operation in 1980 and will continue to run until 2040 at Beloyarsk Nuclear Power Station. In the first 24 years of operations, there have been 12 water-into-sodium leaks in the steam generators, routinely addressed by isolating the faulty module with gate valves.

Construction of BN-800 (a pool type LMFBR reactor) began in 1984, but after Chernobyl disaster was put on hold, later in 1990-s the construction was frozen due to economic situation, in 2006 the construction was started again. The plant reached its full power production in August 2016.

A similar reactor, Superphénix, operated in France from 1985 until 1998.

=== Design concept ===
The design features a breeding ratio of 1.15, surpassing the BN-800's breeding ratio of 1. Both oxide and nitride fuels are being evaluated for its core. The refuelling period will be 330 days, unlike the BN-800, which has a 180-day interval.

The World Nuclear Association lists the BN-1200 as a commercial reactor, in contrast to its predecessors.

== Construction ==
In April 2025, the licence for the construction of a BN-1200M at Beloyarsk Nuclear Power Station was issued. By July 2025, the preparatory phase for construction had commenced. Site clearance work has been taking place in 2026.

== See also ==
- BN-350 reactor
- BN-600 reactor – Russian sodium-cooled fast breeder reactor
- BN-800 reactor – Russian fast breeder nuclear reactor, operating since 2016
- BREST-300 - generation IV lead-cooled fast reactor, in construction since 2020
- Generation IV reactor
