= Steam generator (nuclear power) =

Heat exchanger used for converting water

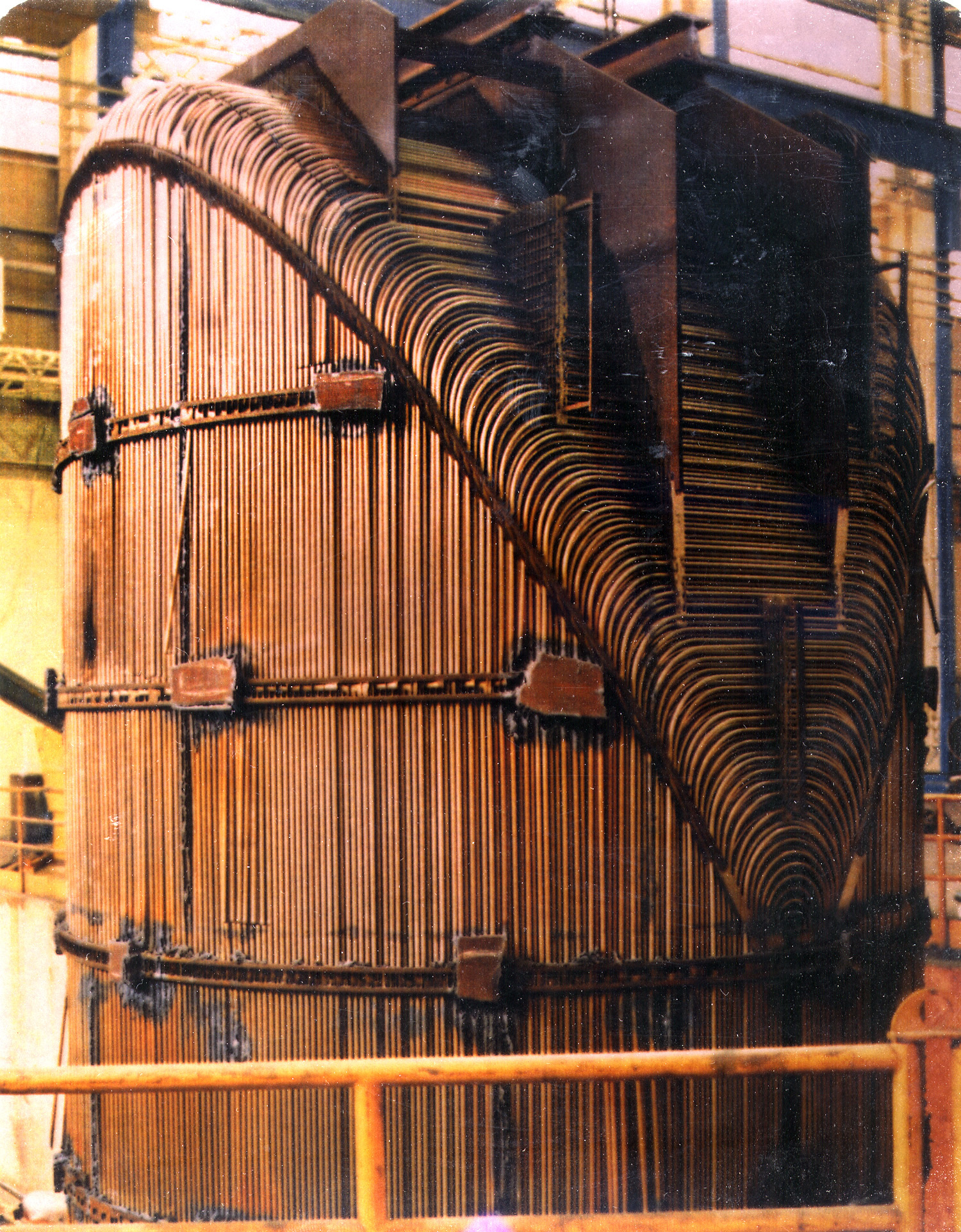
The inverted U-tube bundle of a Combustion Engineering steam generator.

A steam generator (aka nuclear steam raising plant ('NSRP')) is a heat exchanger used to convert water into steam from heat produced in a nuclear reactor core. It is used in pressurized water reactors (PWRs), between the primary and secondary coolant loops. It is also used in liquid metal cooled reactors (LMRs), pressurized heavy-water reactors (PHWRs), and gas-cooled reactors (GCRs).

In typical PWR designs, the primary coolant is high-purity water, kept under high pressure so it cannot boil. This primary coolant is pumped through the reactor core where it absorbs heat from the fuel rods. It then passes through the steam generator, where it transfers its heat (via conduction through metal) to lower-pressure water which is allowed to boil.

== Purpose ==
Unlike PWRs, boiling water reactors (BWRs) do not use steam generators. The primary coolant is allowed to boil directly in the reactor core, and the steam is simply passed through a steam turbine. While theoretically simple, this has a downside for maintenance. While passing through the core, primary coolant water is subjected to high neutron flux. This activates oxygen and dissolved nitrogen in the water. The major reaction is: an atom of oxygen-16 absorbs 1 neutron and emits 1 proton, becoming nitrogen-16. Nitrogen-16 has a 7-second half-life and produces a gamma ray when it decays back to oxygen-16. The 7-second half-life is long enough for the water to circulate out of the reactor. In a BWR, this means that the water may be in the steam turbine when it releases its gamma rays. Although no long-lived radioisotopes are produced by this reaction, the gamma radiation means that humans cannot be present in a BWR's turbine hall during reactor operation and for a short time afterwards.

By contrast, in a PWR, the steam generator separates the activated primary coolant water from the secondary coolant which passes through the steam turbine. Thus, humans can freely access a PWR's turbines and other steam plant components during operation. This reduces maintenance cost and improves up-time.

== Description ==
Vertical recirculating-type steam generator (typical of Westinghouse and Combustion Engineering-designed reactors) and components.

In commercial power plants, there are two to four steam generators per reactor; each steam generator can measure up to 70 feet (21 m) in height and weigh as much as 800 tons. Each steam generator can contain anywhere from 3,000 to 16,000 tubes, each about .75 inches (19 mm) in diameter. The coolant (treated water), which is maintained at high pressure to prevent boiling, is pumped through the nuclear reactor core. Heat transfer takes place between the reactor core and the circulating water and the coolant is then pumped through the primary tube side of the steam generator by coolant pumps before returning to the reactor core. This is referred to as the primary loop.

That water flowing through the steam generator boils water on the shell side (which is kept at a lower pressure than the primary side) to produce steam. This is referred to as the secondary loop. The secondary-side steam is delivered to the turbines to make electricity. The steam is subsequently condensed via cooled water from a tertiary loop and returned to the steam generator to be heated once again. The tertiary cooling water may be recirculated to cooling towers where it sheds waste heat before returning to condense more steam. Once-through tertiary cooling may otherwise be provided by a river, lake, or ocean. This primary, secondary, tertiary cooling scheme is the basis of the pressurized water reactor, which is the most common nuclear power plant design worldwide.

In other types of reactors, such as the pressurised heavy water reactors of the CANDU design, the primary fluid is heavy water. Liquid metal cooled reactors such as the Russian BN-600 reactor use a liquid metal, such as sodium, as the primary coolant. These also use heat exchangers between primary metal coolant and the secondary water coolant, and thus their secondary and tertiary cooling is similar to a PWR.

A steam generator's heat-exchange tubes have an important safety role, because they separate radioactive and non-radioactive fluid systems. (The primary coolant becomes briefly radioactive from its exposure to the core, and also has trace amounts of longer-lived radioactive isotopes dissolved in it, such as dissolved atoms of iron from pipes.) Because the primary coolant is at higher pressure, a ruptured heat-exchange tube would cause primary coolant to leak into the secondary loop. Typically this would require the plant to shut down for repair. To avoid such primary-secondary leaks, steam generator tubes are periodically inspected by eddy-current testing, and individual tubes can be plugged to remove them from operation. As with many nuclear components, mechanical engineers determine the inspection frequency using the known rates of corrosion and crack propagation in the material. If an inspection finds that a tube wall is thin enough that it might corrode through before the next scheduled inspection, the tube is plugged. (Plugging a tube is typically easier than attempting to repair it. There are many small heat-exchange tubes, and steam generators are designed with excess tubes to allow some to be plugged.)

Entire steam generators are often replaced in plant mid-life, which is a major undertaking. Most U.S. PWR plants have had steam generators replaced.

=== History ===
The nuclear powered steam generator originated in the development of propulsion systems for the first nuclear submarine, the USS ‘‘Nautilus’’ (SSN-571). The reactor plant for the submarine was designed by the Westinghouse Electric Company. Babcock & Wilcox (B&W), which had maintained a relationship with the U.S. Navy since the late 19th century and had contributed to the Manhattan Project during World War II, established its Atomic Energy Division in 1953 to provide primary system nuclear power components to the ‘‘Nautilus’’ under subcontract with Westinghouse. At that time, B&W was internationally recognized for its expertise in high pressure boilers and steam generators.Outline History of Nuclear Energy, World Nuclear Association (2014)

Following the authorization of peaceful nuclear reactors for commercial electricity generation, power companies began applying this technology to civilian power plants. In 1960, Westinghouse built one of the first commercial nuclear power plants in the United States, the Yankee Rowe Nuclear Power Station, which utilized nuclear powered steam generators and had an electrical output of 100 MWe. By comparison, some modern plants exceed 1100 MWe in output.

Babcock & Wilcox also played a major role in early commercial nuclear power development, manufacturing components for the Shippingport Atomic Power Station in Pennsylvania, constructed in 1956 to 1957, the first full scale peacetime nuclear power plant in the United States. Other companies, including Combustion Engineering and General Electric, were likewise involved in advancing nuclear steam supply systems and developing steam generator technology for commercial nuclear power applications.

== Types ==
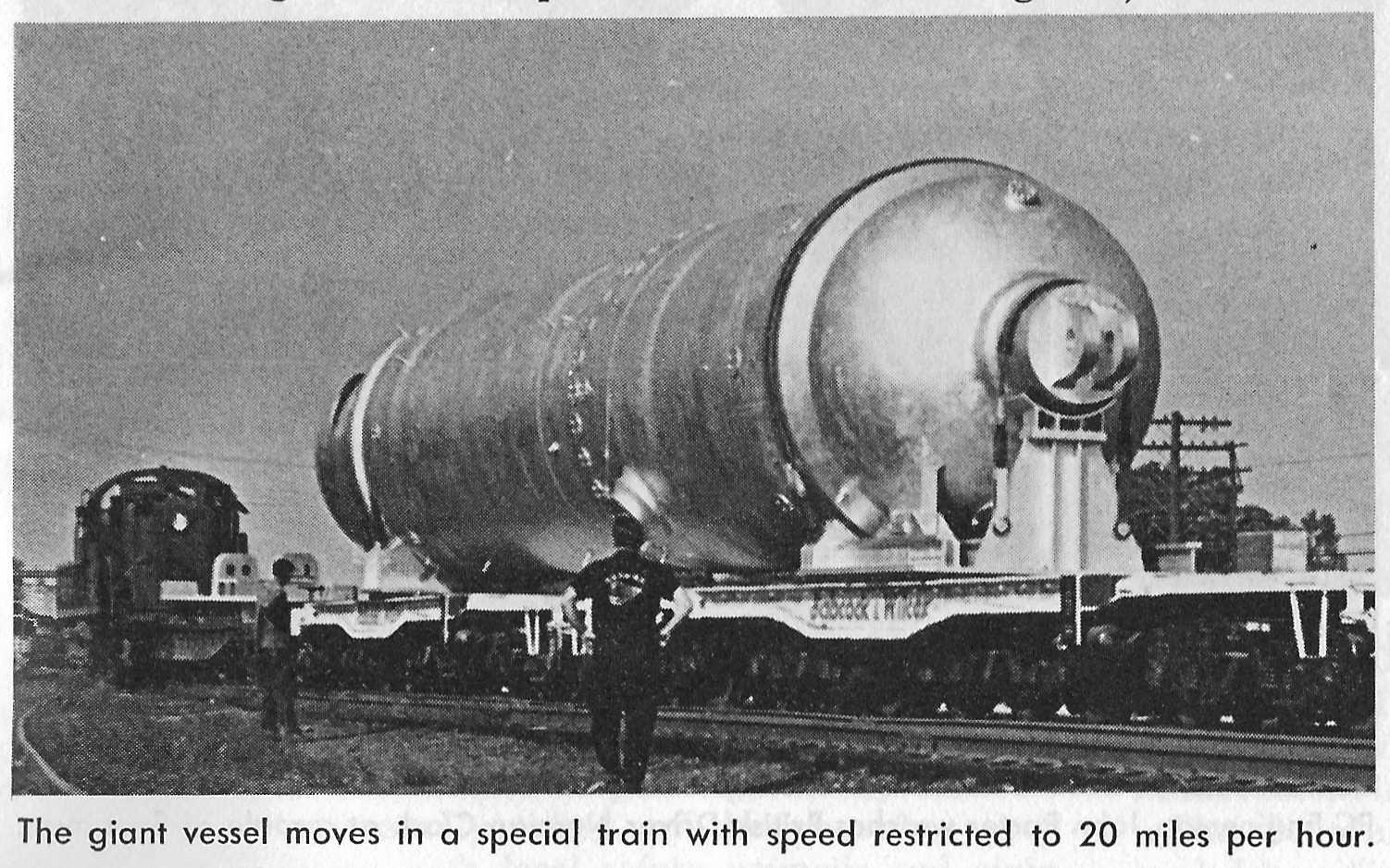
This Babcock & Wilcox nuclear steam generator moved in a special train (restricted to 20 mph) via the Penn Central Railroad and Southern Railway from Barberton, Ohio to a Duke Energy site in Oconee, S.C. This generator weights 1,140,000 lbs and is a record shipment for the Railroad at that time (1970).

A once-through steam generator

A VVER steam generator

Westinghouse and Combustion Engineering designs have vertical U-tubes with inverted tubes for the primary water. Canadian, Japanese, French, and German PWR suppliers use the vertical configuration as well. Russian VVER reactor designs use horizontal steam generators, which have the tubes mounted horizontally. Babcock & Wilcox plants (e.g., Three Mile Island) have smaller steam generators that force water through the top of the OTSGs (once-through steam generators; counter-flow to the feedwater) and out the bottom to be recirculated by the reactor coolant pumps. The horizontal design has proven to be less susceptible to degradation than the vertical U-tube design.

=== Materials and construction ===
The materials that make up the turbine and pipes of a nuclear powered steam generator are specially made and specifically designed to withstand the heat and radiation of the reactor. The water tubes also have to be able to resist corrosion from water for an extended period of time. The pipes that are used in American reactors are made of Inconel, either Alloy 600 or Alloy 690. Alloy 690 is made with extra chromium and most facilities heat treat the metal to make it better able to resist heat and corrosion. The high nickel content in Alloy 600 and Alloy 690 make them well suited for resisting acids and high degrees of stress and temperature.

=== Degradation ===
The annealed, or heat treated, Alloy 600 was prone to tube denting and thinning due to water chemistry. Plants that used the Alloy 600 in their water tubes therefore had to install new water chemistry controllers and change the chemicals they put in the water. Due to this, pipe thinning has been taken care of, but on rare occasions, tube denting still occurs, causing leaks and ruptures. The only way to prevent this is regular maintenance and check-ups, but this forces the reactor to shut down. In some cases, plants replaced their Alloy 600 tubes with Alloy 690 tubes and a few plants were shut down. To prevent future problems, manufacturers of steam turbines for nuclear power plants have improved their fabrication techniques and used other materials, such as stainless steel, to prevent tube denting.

== Typical operating conditions ==
Steam generators in a "typical" PWR in the USA have the following operating conditions:

Side	Pressure (absolute)	Inlet temperature	Outlet temperature
Primary side (tube side)	15.5 MPa (2,250 psi)	315 °C (599 °F) (liquid water)	275 °C (527 °F) (liquid water)
Secondary side (shell side)	6.2 MPa (900 psi)	220 °C (428 °F) (liquid water)	275 °C (527 °F) (saturated steam)

== Tube material ==
Various high-performance alloys and superalloys have been used for steam generator tubing, including type 316 stainless steel, Alloy 400, Alloy 600MA (mill annealed), Alloy 600TT (thermally treated), Alloy 690TT, and Alloy 800Mod.

== See also ==
- Nuclear power plant
- Power station
- Steam turbine
