= BN-600 reactor =

Russian sodium-cooled fast breeder reactor

Coordinates: 56°50′30″N 61°19′21″E

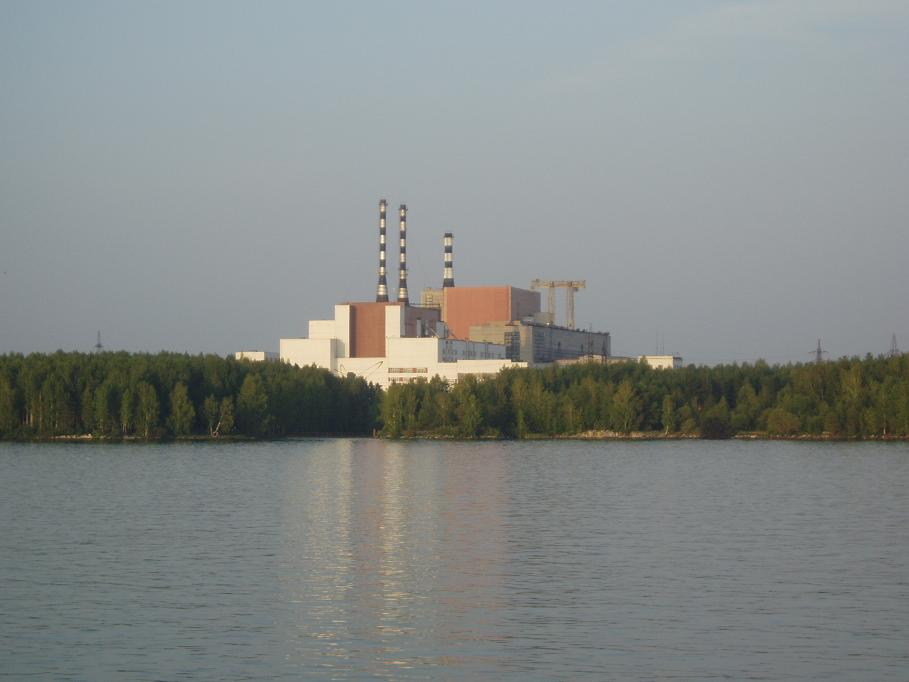
Main building of Beloyarsk Nuclear Power Station as seen from the Beloyarskoye Reservoir near Zarechny, Sverdlovsk Oblast, Russia. Beloyarsk has the largest fast breeder reactor, the (BN-600), at 600 MW it is the second-most powerful breeder in the world. Construction of a second breeder reactor, the BN-800 reactor, was completed in 2016.

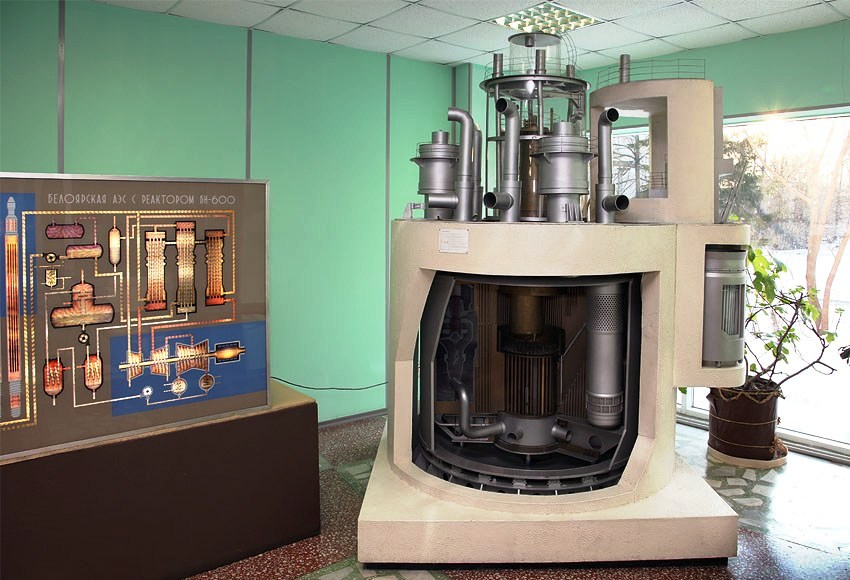
A cutaway model of the reactor. The core, that is the nuclear fuel at the heart of the reactor has dimensions of 2 meters in height by 0.75 meters in diameter, similar to the BN-800 reactor.

The BN-600 reactor is a sodium-cooled fast breeder reactor, built at the Beloyarsk Nuclear Power Station, in Zarechny, Sverdlovsk Oblast, Russia. It has a 600 MWe gross capacity and a 560 MWe net capacity, provided to the Middle Urals power grid. It has been in operation since 1980 and represents an improvement to the preceding BN-350 reactor. In 2014, its larger sister reactor, the BN-800 reactor, began operation.

The plant is a pool type LMFBR, where the reactor, coolant pumps, intermediate heat exchangers and associated piping are all located in a common liquid sodium pool. The reactor system is housed in a concrete rectilinear building and provided with filtration and gas containment.

In the first 24 years of operations, there have been 12 water-into-sodium leaks in the steam generators, routinely addressed by isolating the faulty module with gate valves. These incidents did not have off-site impact, did not generate radioactive material (sodium in the secondary circuit is not neutron-activated) and were not reported to IAEA, since they were deemed to have no impact on safety.

As of 2022, the cumulative "energy Availability factor" recorded by the IAEA was 76.3%.

The reactor core is 1.03 metres (3 ft 5 in) tall with a diameter of 2.05 metres (6 ft 9 in). It has 369 fuel assemblies, mounted vertically; each consists of 127 fuel rods enriched to between 17–26% ^{235}U. In comparison, normal enrichment in other Russian reactors is between 3–4% ^{235}U. The control and scram system is composed of 27 reactivity control elements including 19 shimming rods, two automatic control rods, and six automatic emergency shut-down rods. On-power refueling equipment allows for charging the core with fresh fuel assemblies, repositioning and turning the fuel assemblies within the reactor, and changing control and scram system elements remotely.

The unit employs a three-circuit coolant arrangement; sodium coolant circulates in both the primary and secondary circuits. Water and steam flow in the third circuit. The sodium is heated to a maximum of 550 °C (1,022 °F) in the reactor during normal operations. This heat is transferred from the reactor core via three independent circulation loops. Each has a primary sodium pump, two intermediate heat exchangers, a secondary sodium pump with an expansion tank located upstream, and an emergency pressure discharge tank. These feed a steam generator, which in turn supplies a condensing turbine that turns the generator.

There is much international interest in the fast-breeder reactor at Beloyarsk. Japan has its own prototype fast-breeder reactors. The operation of the reactor is an international study in progress; Russia, France, Japan, and the United Kingdom currently participate.

The reactor is expected to operate up until 2040.

== See also ==
- Generation IV reactor
- BN-Reactor
- BN-350 reactor – Deactivated fast breeder reactor in Aktau, Kazakhstan
- BN-800 reactor – Russian fast breeder nuclear reactor, operating since 2016
- BN-1200 reactor – Fast breeder nuclear reactor under development in Russia
- MBIR – Fast neutron research reactor
- Prototype Fast Breeder Reactor – Indian fast breeder nuclear reactor design
