= BN-800 reactor =

Russian fast breeder nuclear reactor, operating since 2016

BN-800
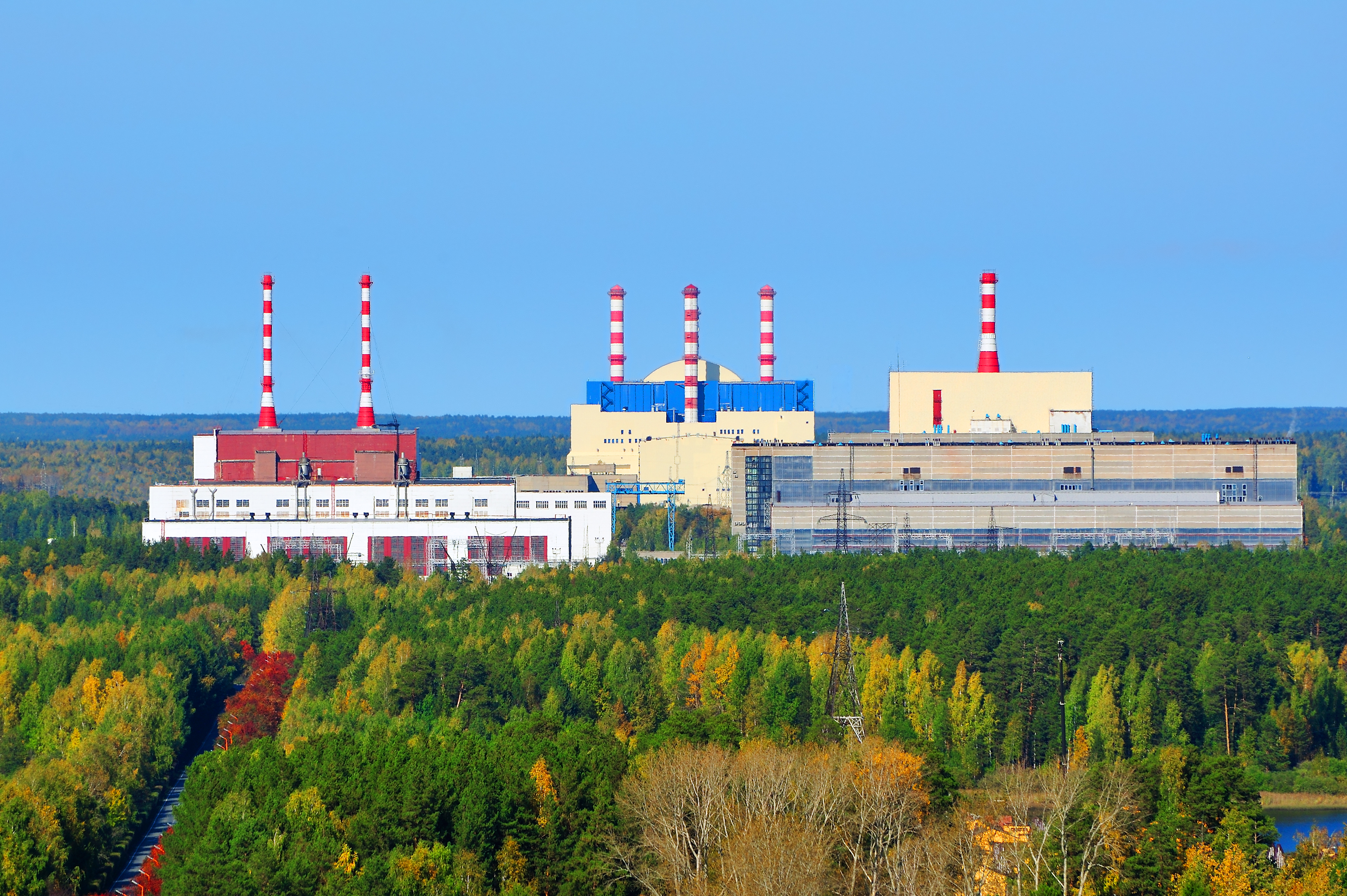
- Generation: Generation IV
- Reactor concept: Fast breeder reactor
- Status: Operational
- Location: Zarechny, Sverdlovsk Oblast, Russia

Main parameters of the reactor core
- Fuel (fissile material): Uranium-plutonium mixed oxide (MOX)
- Fuel state: Solid
- Neutron energy spectrum: Fast
- Primary coolant: Liquid sodium

Reactor usage
- Power (thermal): 2100 MW_{th}
- Power (electric): 820 MW_{e} net 885 MW_{e} gross

The BN-800 reactor (Russian: реактор БН–800) is a sodium-cooled fast breeder reactor, built at the Beloyarsk Nuclear Power Station, in Zarechny, Sverdlovsk Oblast, Russia. The reactor is designed to generate 880 MW of electrical power. The plant was considered part of the weapons-grade Plutonium Management and Disposition Agreement signed between the United States and Russia. A 2014 study examined using BN-800 to dispose of plutonium by consuming it as reactor fuel. The plant reached its full power production in August 2016. According to Russian business journal Kommersant, the BN-800 project cost 140.6 billion rubles (roughly 2.17 billion dollars).

== Design ==
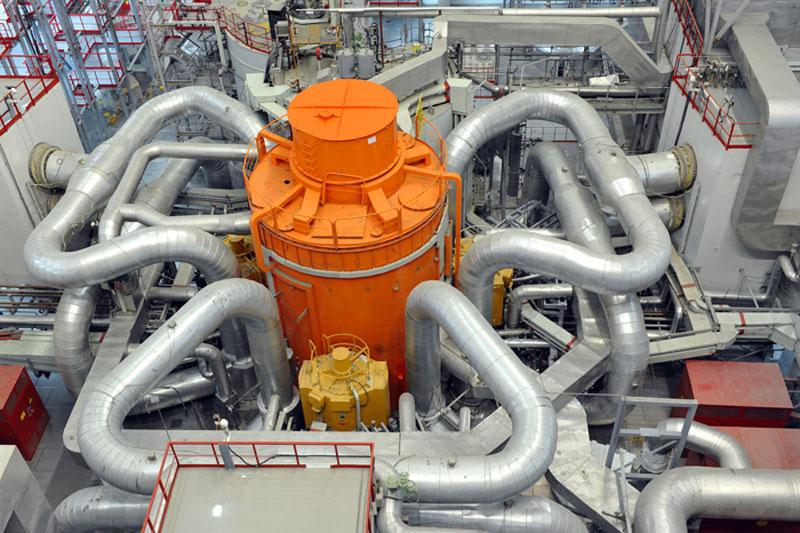
The BN-800 reactor

The plant is a pool-type liquid-metal-cooled fast breeder reactor (LMFBR), in which the reactor, coolant pumps, intermediate heat exchangers and associated piping are all located in a common liquid sodium pool. This is similar to the general design of EBR-II, which went into service in 1963, but is otherwise significantly different. For example, EBR-II used metallic fuel, whereas BN-800 uses oxide fuel. The design of this plant was started in 1983 and was completely revised in 1987 after the Chernobyl disaster and to a somewhat lesser degree in 1993, according to the new safety guidelines. After the second revision, output power was increased by 10% to 880 MW due to the increased efficiency of the power generator steam turbines.

The reactor core is, in size and mechanical properties, very similar to the BN-600 reactor core, but the fuel composition is not. While BN-600 uses medium-enriched uranium dioxide, this plant burns mixed uranium–plutonium fuel, helping to reduce the weapons-grade plutonium stockpile and provide information about the functioning of the closed uranium-plutonium fuel cycle, which does not require plutonium separation or other chemical processing.

The unit employs a three-circuit coolant arrangement; sodium coolant circulates in both the primary and secondary circuits. Water and steam flow in the third circuit. This heat is transferred from the reactor core via several independent circulation loops. Each is composed of a primary sodium pump, two intermediate heat exchangers, a secondary sodium pump with an expansion tank located upstream, and an emergency pressure discharge tank. These feed a steam generator, which in turn supplies a condensing turbine that turns the generator.

Many infrastructure facilities were designed to accommodate both the BN-800 and a proposed BN-1200 reactor.

== History ==
Construction started in 1983 as Unit 4 at the Beloyarsk nuclear power plant. It was put on hold after Chernobyl. It resumed in 2006 and BN-800 achieved minimum controlled power in 2014, but issues led to further fuel development work. On 31 July 2015, the unit achieved minimum controlled power again – 0.13% of rated power. The reactor was connected to the grid in December 2015 and achieved full power for the first time in August 2016. Commercial operation began on 31 October 2016.

In September 2000, the United States and Russia signed the Plutonium Management and Disposition Agreement, under which each country would dispose of at least 34 metric tons of surplus weapons-grade plutonium.

In 2016, the Obama administration proposed ending construction of the US MOX Fuel Fabrication Facility. The construction contract was terminated in October 2018. The administration proposed that the US share of plutonium be diluted with non-radioactive material and disposed of in the underground WIPP facility. However, the dilution could be reversed, and the material reconverted into weapons-grade plutonium.

On 3 October 2016, Russian president Vladimir Putin ordered the agreement to be suspended because the US did not meet its obligations.

In January 2020, the reactor began operating with a new batch of uranium–plutonium mixed-oxide (MOX) fuel. Its initial core already contained MOX alongside uranium oxide.

Rosenergoatom's 2026 operating review describes the transition from a hybrid core to a full MOX core during 2020–2023, with full MOX loading completed in 2023.

== Plutonium disposal ==
The BN-800 could be used to close the fuel cycle. The core load of 15 tons of material consists mostly of U-238 and about 20.5% plutonium. This could be taken from reprocessed spent nuclear fuel assemblies.

== See also ==
- Generation IV reactor
- BN-Reactor
- BN-350 reactor – Deactivated fast breeder reactor in Aktau, Kazakhstan
- BN-600 reactor – Russian sodium-cooled fast breeder reactor
- BN-1200 reactor – Fast breeder nuclear reactor under development in Russia
- Integral Fast Reactor – Nuclear reactor design
