= Plutonium Management and Disposition Agreement =

2000 nuclear agreement

The Plutonium Management and Disposition Agreement is an agreement between the United States and Russia signed in 2000, wherein both nations agreed to dispose of significant fractions of their "excess" (beyond what they need for their nuclear weapons) weapons-grade plutonium. An amended version was signed in April 2010 and went into effect in July 2011.

The US has about 90 tons of weapons-capable plutonium, while Russia has 128 tons. The US declared 60 tons as excess, while Russia declared 50 tons excess. The two sides agreed that each would eliminate 34 tons.

The agreement regulates the conversion of non-essential plutonium into mixed oxide (MOX) fuel used to produce electricity. Both sides were required to render 34 tons of weapons grade plutonium, into reactor grade plutonium alongside reaching the spent fuel standard, that is mixed with the other more highly irradiating products within spent fuel, making the plutonium relatively inaccessible and unattractive for weapons use.

In 2007, the US began constructing the Mixed Oxide Fuel Fabrication Facility (MFFF) on the Savannah River Site. For financial reasons, US president Barack Obama stopped construction of the MFFF in 2016 and proposed that the plutonium be diluted with non-radioactive material and disposed in the underground WIPP facility. However, the dilution could be reversed, and the material reconverted into weapons-grade plutonium.

By 2015, Russia was on track and had begun producing MOX fuel at its own MOX facility, for its fast reactor, the BN-800.

On October 3, 2016, Russian president Vladimir Putin ordered the agreement to be suspended because the US did not meet their obligations. In 2016, Sergey Kirienko, director general of Rosatom, stated that they had built their MOX plant for $136 million in 2.5 years.

In May 2018, Energy Secretary Rick Perry informed Congress he had effectively ended the about 70% complete MFFF project. Perry stated that the cost of a dilute and dispose approach to the plutonium will cost $20 billion, less than half of the remaining lifecycle cost of the MOX plant program ($49 billion).
