= Lead-cooled fast reactor =

Fast-neutron nuclear reactor cooled by molten lead

Lead cooled fast reactor scheme

The lead-cooled fast reactor is a nuclear reactor design that uses molten lead or lead-bismuth eutectic as its coolant. These materials can be used as the primary coolant because they have low neutron absorption and relatively low melting points. Neutrons are slowed less by interaction with these heavy nuclei (thus not being neutron moderators) so these reactors operate with fast neutrons.

The concept is generally similar to sodium-cooled fast reactors, and most liquid-metal fast reactors have used sodium instead of lead. Few lead-cooled reactors have been constructed, except for the Soviet submarine K-27 and the seven Soviet Alfa-class submarines (though these were beryllium-moderated intermediate energy reactors rather than fast reactors). Some proposed new nuclear reactor designs are lead-cooled.

Fuel designs being explored for this reactor scheme include fertile uranium as a metal, metal oxide or metal nitride.

The lead-cooled reactor design has been proposed as a generation IV reactor. Plans for future implementation of this type of reactor include modular arrangements rated at 300 to 400 MWe, and a large monolithic plant rated at 1,200 MWe.

== Operation ==
Lead-cooled fast reactors operate with fast neutrons and molten lead or lead-bismuth eutectic coolant. Molten lead or lead-bismuth eutectic can be used as the primary coolant because especially lead, and to a lesser degree bismuth, have low neutron absorption and relatively low melting points. Neutrons are slowed less by interaction with these heavy nuclei (thus not being neutron moderators), and therefore help make this type of reactor a fast-neutron reactor. If a neutron hits a particle with a similar mass (such as hydrogen in a pressurized water reactor (PWR), it tends to lose kinetic energy. If it hits a much heavier atom such as lead, the neutron will "bounce off" without losing this energy. The coolant serves as a neutron reflector, returning some escaping neutrons to the core.

Smaller capacity lead-cooled fast reactors (such as SSTAR) can be cooled by natural convection, while larger designs (such as ELSY) use forced circulation in normal power operation, but will employ natural circulation emergency cooling. No operator intervention is required, nor pumping of any kind to cool the residual heat of the reactor after shutdown. The reactor outlet coolant temperature is typically in the range of 500 to 600 °C, possibly ranging over 800 °C with advanced materials for later designs. Temperatures higher than 800 °C are theoretically high enough to support thermochemical production of hydrogen through the sulfur-iodine cycle, although this has not been demonstrated.

The concept is generally very similar to sodium-cooled fast reactors, and most liquid-metal fast reactors have used sodium instead of lead. Few lead-cooled reactors have been constructed, except for some Soviet nuclear submarine reactors in the 1970s, but some proposed new nuclear reactor designs are lead-cooled, with one under construction.

== Fuel ==
Fuel designs being explored for this reactor scheme include fertile uranium as a metal, metal oxide or metal nitride.

== Small modular reactors ==
Reactors that use lead or lead-bismuth eutectic can be designed in a large range of power ratings. The Soviet Union was able to operate the Alfa-class submarines with a lead-bismuth cooled intermediate-spectrum reactor moderated with beryllium from the 1960s to 1998, which had approximately 30 MW of mechanical output for 155 MW thermal power (see below).

Other options include units featuring long-life, pre-manufactured cores, that do not require refueling for many years.

The lead-cooled fast reactor battery is a small turnkey-type power plant using cassette cores running on a closed fuel cycle with 15 to 20 years' refuelling interval, or entirely replaceable reactor modules. It is designed for generation of electricity on small grids (and other resources, including hydrogen production and desalinisation process for the production of potable water).

== Advantages of lead in fast reactors ==
The use of lead as a coolant has several advantages when compared to other methods for reactor cooling:

- Molten lead does not significantly moderate neutrons. Moderation occurs when neutrons are slowed down by repeated collisions with a medium. When the neutron collides with atoms that are much heavier than itself, almost no energy is lost in the process. Thus, the neutrons are not slowed down by lead, which ensures that the neutrons keep their high energy. This is similar to other fast reactor concepts, including the molten liquid sodium designs.
- Molten lead acts as a reflector for neutrons. Neutrons escaping the core of the reactor are to some extent directed back into the core, which allows a better neutron economy. This in turn enables more spacing between the fuel elements in the reactor, allowing better heat removal by the lead coolant.
- Lead undergoes almost no activation by neutrons. Thus, virtually no radioactive elements are created by absorption of neutrons by the lead. This is in contrast to the lead-bismuth eutectic which was used in other fast designs, including in Russian submarines. The bismuth-209 in this mixture (which has a lower melting point, 123.5 °C, than that of pure lead) is activated to form ^{210}Po, polonium-210, which is a dangerous alpha emitter.
- Although lead absorbs few neutrons, because of its high density (10.66 g/cm^{3}, for liquid at its melting point), lead is very effective at absorbing gamma rays and other less penetrating ionizing radiation (alpha and beta particles). This ensures that radiation outside the reactor is kept at a low level.
- In contrast to molten sodium metal, another metallic coolant used in fast reactors, lead does not have issues with flammability, and will solidify from a leak.
- The very wide temperature range at which lead remains liquid (up to 1400 K or 1126 °C) implies that any thermal excursions are absorbed without any pressure increase. In practice, the operational temperature will be kept at around 500 °C (932 °F) – 550 °C (1,022 °F), mainly because of the limitations of metallic alloys used in reactor structural components, such as their sensitivity to corrosion by a liquid metal (liquid metal embrittlement) and amalgam-driven metal dissolution (continuous Cr and Ni extraction from the stainless steel).
- As with all fast reactor designs, because of the high temperature and high thermal inertia, passive cooling is possible in emergency situations. Thus, no electrical pumping assistance should be required, natural convection being sufficient to remove residual heat after shutdown. To achieve this, reactor designs include dedicated passive heat removal systems that require no electrical power and no operator action.
- All fast reactor designs operate at substantial higher temperatures in the core than water cooled (and moderated) reactors. This allows a significantly higher thermodynamic efficiency in the steam generators. Thus, a larger portion of the nuclear fission energy can be converted into electricity. More than 40% efficiency is achievable in real conditions, compared to around 30% in water-cooled reactors.
- Similarly, as with all fast spectrum reactors, the coolant is not pressurized. This means that no pressure vessel is required, and the piping and ducts can be constructed with less pressure-resistant steel and alloys. Any leak in the primary coolant circuit will not be ejected at very high pressure.
- Lead has a high thermal conductivity (35 W/m・K) compared to that of water (0.58 W/m・K), which means that heat transport from the fuel elements to the coolant is efficient.
- Instead of regular refueling, the whole core can be replaced after many years of operation. Such a reactor is suitable for countries that do not plan to build their own nuclear infrastructure.

== Disadvantages ==
- Lead and lead-bismuth are very dense, increasing the weight of the system and therefore requiring more structural support and seismic protection, which increases building cost.
- While lead is cheap and abundant, bismuth is expensive and quite rare. Depending on its size, a grid-connected lead-bismuth reactor requires hundreds or thousands of tonnes of lead-bismuth.
- Solidification of lead-bismuth solution blocks the coolant circulation and immobilizes parts of the reactor control systems, rendering the reactor inoperable. However, lead-bismuth eutectic (LBE) has a comparatively lower melting temperature of 123.5 °C (254.3 °F), making melting a less difficult task. Lead has a higher melting point of 327.5 °С, but is often used as a pool type reactor where the large bulk of lead does not quickly freeze.
- By leaking and solidifying, the coolant may damage equipment (see Soviet submarine K-64) if no measures are taken to contain such leaks.
- Lead-bismuth produces polonium-210 from neutron activation of bismuth-209. This radioactive nuclide will dissolve in the lead-bismuth and is an alpha emitter with a half-life of 138.38 days. This can seriously complicate maintenance and pose a severe plant alpha-contamination risk. The alpha particle emitted by ^{210}Po has a high energy (~ 5.4 MeV). It is, therefore, highly radiotoxic in case of internal contamination of the body (inhalation and ingestion risks) because of its high ionization density severely damaging the cells affected in the contaminated tissues.
- The most challenging problems of liquid lead and LBE are the possible damage caused by erosion and corrosion to the fuel elements and reactor internals. Surface erosion is aggravated by the high density and associated kinetic energy of the liquid metal circulating at elevated speed in the reactor, especially if it would become contaminated by abrasive solid particles (oxides detached from metallic surfaces) or metallic debris. Corrosion is fuelled by the dissolution of metals present in alloys (e.g., Ni, Cr, released from stainless steel) in the liquid metal coolant (formation of liquid amalgam with precipitation of the dissolved metals at cold points) and the liquid metal embrittlement (LME) of the fuel claddings and structural materials of the reactor internals. To mitigate the corrosion problem, it is necessary to form a very thin and as dense as possible oxide film passivating the metallic surface. This could be achieved by accurately controlling the dissolved oxygen/metallic oxides in the metallic coolant. Insufficient oxygen level would expose the bare metallic surface to severe corrosion problems. At the same time, an O_{2} excess would generate thick porous oxide films prone to be detached from the metal surface and aggravating erosion and blocking problems. The corrosion rate also increases with temperature. Newly developed alloys, such as alumina forming austenitic steels (containing Al added as passivating agent), which maintain a protective oxide layer onto the surface of the metallic reactor components, are also being studied as candidate materials to attempt to mitigate corrosion problems.
- The high density of lead and LBE means that the fuel elements, control rods and mobile reactor components are all floating in the metallic coolant, complicating the engineering systems needed to handle them and avoid floating debris.
- Metallic coolants (Pb, LBE, Na) are opaque to visible light, seriously complicating the refueling and maintenance operations of the reactor, therefore requiring special systems to handle the fuel elements and the control rods safely. However, the design and operational experience already existing for sodium-cooled fast breeders could also be applied to lead-cooled fast reactors.
- Lead has a positive void coefficient, or void reactivity, meaning that as voids occur in the circulating coolant an increase in fertile fission and a decrease in the capture rate of all heavy nuclides results in reactivity increases as the void content inside the reactor increases, potentially leading to a positive feedback loop unless controlled by automatic mechanisms.

== By country ==
=== Belgium ===
The MYRRHA project (for Multi-purpose hYbrid Research Reactor for High-tech Applications) is aimed to contribute to design a future nuclear reactor coupled to a proton accelerator (so-called Accelerator-driven system, ADS). This could be a 'lead-bismuth-cooled, or a lead-cooled, fast reactor' with two possible configurations: sub-critical or critical. It could be a pool-, or a loop-type, reactor.

The project is managed by SCK CEN, the Belgian research center for nuclear energy. It is based on a first small prototype research demonstrator, the Guinevere system, derived from the zero-power reactor Venus existing at SCK CEN since the beginning of the 1960s and modified to host a bath of molten lead-bismuth eutectic (LBE) coupled to a small proton accelerator. In December 2010, MYRRHA was listed by the European Commission as one of 50 projects for maintaining European leadership in nuclear research in the next 20 years. In 2013, the project entered a further development phase when a contract for the front-end engineering design was awarded to a consortium led by Areva.

Aiming at a compact core with high power density (i.e. with a high neutron flux) to be able to operate as a materials testing reactor, the fuel to be used in the ADS MYRRHA must be highly enriched in a fissile isotope. A highly enriched MOx fuel with 30 – 35 wt. % of ^{239}Pu was first selected to obtain the desired neutronic performances. However, according to Abderrahim et al. (2005) "this choice should still be checked against the non-proliferation requirements imposed to new test reactors by the RERTR (Reduced Enrichment of fuel for Research Testing Reactors) program launched by US DOE in 1996". So, the fuel to be selected for MYRRHA also needs to respect the criteria of non-proliferation while keeping its neutronic performance. Moreover, such a highly enriched MOx fuel has never been industrially produced and poses severe technical and safety challenges in order to prevent any criticality accident during handling in the factory.

In 2009, under the auspices of the Nuclear Energy Agency (NEA, OECD), an international team of experts (MYRRHA International Review Team, MIRT) examined the MYRRHA project and delivered prudent recommendations to the Belgian government. Beside the technical challenges identified, they were also financial and economical risks related to the construction and exploitation costs expected to strongly increase when the project should enter a more detailed design stage. Long construction delays related to design complications, underestimated technical difficulties and insufficient budget are not uncommon for such a project. The limited participation of the Belgian State (40% of all the costs) and the uncertain benefits for the external project owners were also pointed out.

Because of recurrent financial shortcomings and also important uncertainties still subsisting in the reactor design (pool-, or loop-type, reactor?) and the choice still to be made for the liquid metal coolant (in LBE, ^{209}Bi is neutron activated producing the highly radiotoxic ⍺-emitting ^{210}Po) the front-end engineering design (FEED) activities had to be suspended and have not progressed beyond the preliminary stage. Quite surprisingly, the preliminary results of the FEED activities were published in a journal absolutely not related to the field of ADS or fast neutron reactor: the International Journal of Hydrogen Energy (IJHE) while there was never any question of producing hydrogen with MYRRHA. The choice of this journal to present the preliminary results of the FEED activities is disconcerting. The journal where the FEED activities were announced, Physics Procedia, is also discontinued. Beside continuously increasing costs and financial uncertainties, the project still has to address many technical challenges: severe corrosion issues (liquid metal embrittlement, amalgam-driven dissolution in the molten metal of Cr and Ni from the stainless steel used for the fuel claddings and reactor structure materials), operating temperature (metal solidification risks versus increased corrosion rate), nuclear criticality safety issues...

The mass inventory of the lead-bismuth eutectic (LBE) for the proposed pool-type design of MYRRHA considered in the preliminary FEED analyses of 2013-2015 represents 4500 tons metallic Pb-Bi. This would lead to the production of more than 4 kg of ^{210}Po during the reactor operations. After the first operating cycle, 350 g of ^{210}Po would already be formed in the LBE exposed to a high neutron flux of the order of 10^{15} neutrons・cm^{–2}・s^{–1}, typical for a materials testing reactor (MTR). This would correspond to an activity of 5.5 × 10^{16} becquerels, or 1.49 × 10^{6} curies of ^{210}Po, just for the first operation cycle. The presence of such a large ponderable quantity of highly radiotoxic ^{210}Po represents a considerable radiological safety challenge for the maintenance operations and the storage of the MYRRHA nuclear fuel. Because of the high volatility of ^{210}Po, the plenum space above the reactor could also become alpha-contaminated. As pointed out by Fiorito et al. (2018): "Some polonium will migrate to the cover gas in the reactor plenum and will diffuse outside the primary system when the reactor is opened for refueling or maintenance". All operations in ^{210}Po contaminated areas will require appropriate radiological protection measures much more severe than for the ^{239}Pu handling, or to be completely performed by remotely-operated robots. An envisaged mitigation strategy could consist into a continuous removal of polonium from LBE, but the considerable heat generated by ^{210}Po represents a major obstacle.

In 2023, based on interviews with key SCK CEN players and documents publicly available, Hein Brookhuis explored the interactions between the MYRRHA promoters and the Belgian media and political spheres to show how MYRRHA was developed in a narrative that made the project seems essential to the future of SCK CEN, the Belgian nuclear research center.

=== Italy/France ===
Paris based company newcleo is developing 30 MWe and 200 MWe lead-cooled small modular reactors for naval and land use. The first operational reactor is planned to be deployed in 2031 in France. By 2026 an electrical simulator of a liquid-lead cooled reactor named PRECURSOR is being built by ENEA and newcleo at the ENEA Research Center in Brasimone (Bologna, Italy).

=== Germany ===
The dual fluid reactor (DFR) project was initially developed by a German research institute, the Institute for Solid-State Nuclear Physics, in Berlin. In February 2021, the project was transferred to a newly founded Canadian company, Dual Fluid Energy Inc., to industrialize the concept. The DFR project attempts to combine the advantages of the molten salt reactor with these of the liquid metal cooled reactor. As a fast breeder reactor, the proposed DFR reactor is designed to burn both natural uranium or thorium, as well as transmutating and fissioning minor actinides. Due to the high thermal conductivity of the molten metal, the residual decay heat of a DFR reactor could be passively removed.

=== Italy/Romania ===
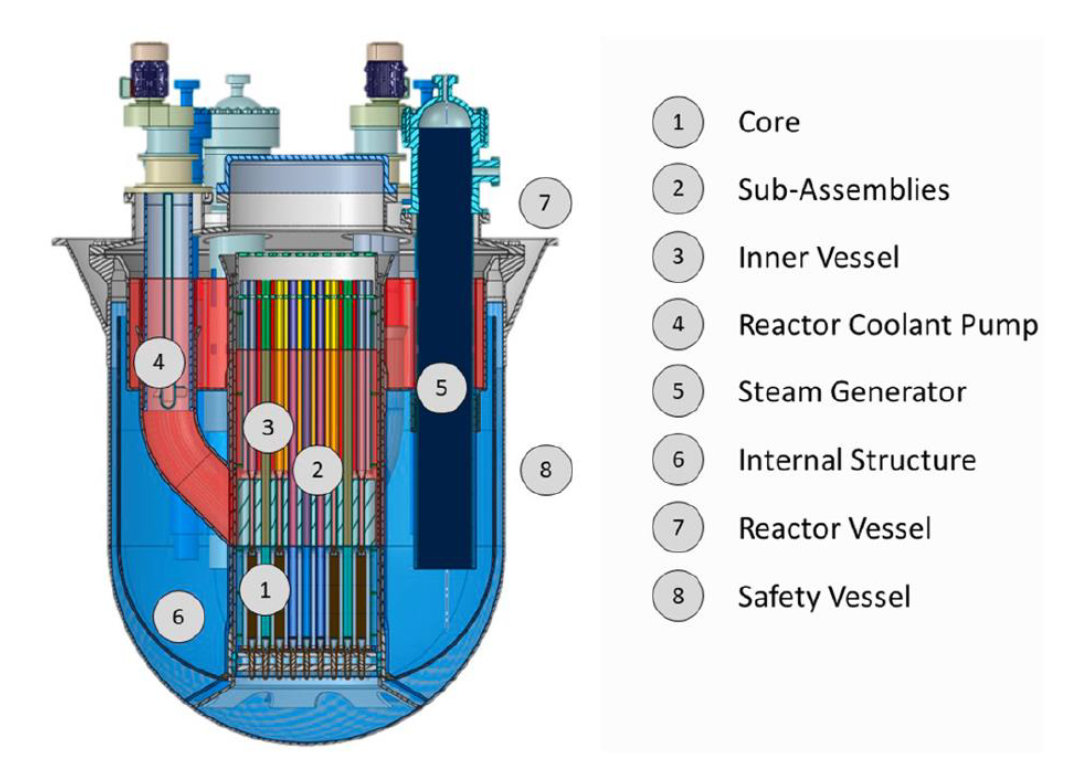
ALFRED IV Gen. Nuclear Reactor by Ansaldo Energia (Italy)

ALFRED (Advanced Lead Fast Reactor European Demonstrator) is a lead cooled fast reactor demonstrator designed by Ansaldo Energia from Italy, planned to be built in Mioveni, Romania. ATHENA, a molten lead pool used for research purposes, is going to be built in the same site as well.

=== Russia ===
Two types of lead-cooled reactor were used in Soviet Alfa-class submarines of the 1970s. The OK-550 and BM-40A designs were both capable of producing 155MWt. They were significantly lighter than typical water-cooled reactors and had an advantage of being capable to quickly switch between maximum power and minimum noise operation modes.. These included a beryllium moderator and were therefore not fast-neutron reactors, but rather intermediate-neutron reactors.

Construction of BREST-OD-300 has started on 8 June 2021. It is expected to start operation in 2026.

=== Sweden ===
The company Blykalla is in collaboration with KTH Royal Institute of Technology and Uniper developing the SEALER-55 (Swedish Advanced Lead Reactor) reactor, a 55 MW lead-cooled mass-produced reactor using uranium nitride as fuel. The Government of Sweden committed 720 million Swedish krona and started building a test facility in early 2025 for a lead-cooled prototype reactor. The reactor, called SEALER-E, is planned to be built by 2026 in collaboration with ABB. The first commercial nuclear reactor (SEALER-One) is planned to be built in Oskarshamn in with the hope of reaching criticality in 2029. Serial production of the SEALER-55 is planned to start in the early 2030s.

=== United States ===
The initial design of the Hyperion Power Module was to be of this type, using uranium nitride fuel encased in HT-9 tubes, using a quartz reflector, and lead-bismuth eutectic as coolant. The firm went out of business in 2018.

The Lawrence Livermore National Laboratory developed SSTAR was a lead-cooled design.

== See also ==
- Fast breeder reactor
- Fast neutron reactor
- Gas-cooled fast reactor
- Generation IV reactor
- Integral fast reactor
- Sodium-cooled fast reactor
