= Soviet submarine K-64 =

1969 Alfa-class submarine

- Alfa-class submarine (Project 705)

History

Soviet Union
- Laid down: 2 June 1968
- Launched: 22 April 1969
- Commissioned: 31 December 1971
- Decommissioned: 19 August 1974
- Out of service: 1972
- Fate: Suffered a major reactor accident, 1972. Deemed too extensive to repair and subsequently scrapped

General characteristics
- Class & type: Alfa-class submarine
- Displacement: 2,300 t (2,300 long tons) surfaced; 3,180 t (3,130 long tons) submerged
- Length: 81.4 m (267 ft 1 in)
- Beam: 9.5 m (31 ft 2 in)
- Draft: 7 m (23 ft 0 in)
- Installed power: 1 × nuclear reactor
- Propulsion: 1 × steam turbine; 1 shaft
- Speed: 14 kn (26 km/h; 16 mph) surfaced; 43 kn (80 km/h; 49 mph) submerged
- Test depth: 350 m (1,150 ft)
- Complement: 30
- Armament: 6 × 533 mm (21.0 in) torpedo tubes

K-64 was the lead ship of the Project 705 (NATO reporting name: Alfa class) nuclear-powered attack submarines of the Soviet Navy.

== Characteristics ==
The Project 705 "Lira" (Russian: Лира, lit. 'lyre', NATO: Alfa) had a double hull made out of titanium alloy and consisted of six compartments, along with an escape chamber for the crew, with a displacement of 2,300 tonnes (2,300 long tons) on the surface and 3,180 tonnes (3,130 long tons) while underwater. The submarine had a length of 81.4 metres (267 ft 1 in), a beam of 9.5 metres (31 ft 2 in), and a draft of 7 metres (23 ft 0 in). Its test depth was 350 m (1,150 ft). The submarine's power source was one 155-megawatt (208,000 hp) liquid metal cooled nuclear reactor that used a lead-bismuth alloy as the coolant. Two reactors types were used for the class, with Project 705 boats receiving the OK-550 reactor and those of the 705K variant using the BM-40A reactor. The reactor provided steam for the OK-7 steam turbine that produced 40,000 horsepower (30,000 kW) for the one propeller shaft. There were also two auxiliary propellers. This gave the submarine a speed of 14 knots (26 km/h; 16 mph) on the surface and 43 knots (80 km/h; 49 mph) while submerged. Its armament were six 533 mm (21.0 in) torpedo tubes with 12 reloads, which could fire normal torpedoes or RPK-2 Vyuga (NATO: SS-N-15 Starfish) anti-submarine missiles. The crew included 24 officers, 4 warrant officers, and 1 petty officer, for a total of 30.

== Fate ==
In 1972, the submarine suffered a major reactor problem in the form of a leak of liquid metal coolant. One of the complications the design had was the need to constantly keep the liquid metal in the reactor heated to at least 123.5C (254.3F) to prevent it from solidifying and freezing the reactor. The metal solidified on contact with the colder outside air, freezing and damaging internal components of the reactor. The submarine was removed from service and towed to Severodvinsk. At the dockyard, the damage to the reactor was deemed too extensive for repair and the decision was made to salvage as much as they could. K-64 was split in half, its bow section (including control spaces) was taken to Leningrad and used for training new Soviet submariners.
