= Hydrogen-moderated self-regulating nuclear power module =

The hydrogen-moderated self-regulating nuclear power module (HPM), also referred to as the compact self-regulating transportable reactor (ComStar), is a type of nuclear power reactor using hydride as a neutron moderator. The design is inherently safe, as the fuel and the neutron moderator is uranium hydride UH_{3}, which is reduced at high temperatures (500–800 °C) to uranium and hydrogen. The gaseous hydrogen exits the core, being absorbed by hydrogen-absorbing material such as depleted uranium, thus making it less critical. This means that with rising temperature the neutron moderation drops and the nuclear fission reaction in the core is dampened, leading to a lower core temperature. This means as more energy is taken out of the core the moderation rises and the fission process is stoked to produce more heat.

The concept for this type of nuclear reactor was developed by the scientists Otis Peterson and Robert Kimpland of the Los Alamos National Laboratory (LANL) in New Mexico. Dr. Otis G. Peterson received a Federal Laboratory Consortium Award in the notable technology development category for this reactor concept in 2002. This technology has since been licensed exclusively to Hyperion Power Generation, under a technology-transfer program and a co-operative research and development agreement (CRADA) with the Los Alamos National Laboratory.

The reactor shares some characteristics with the TRIGA research reactors, which are operated by research laboratories and universities around the world, as well as the SNAP-10A reactor, which was developed for space applications.

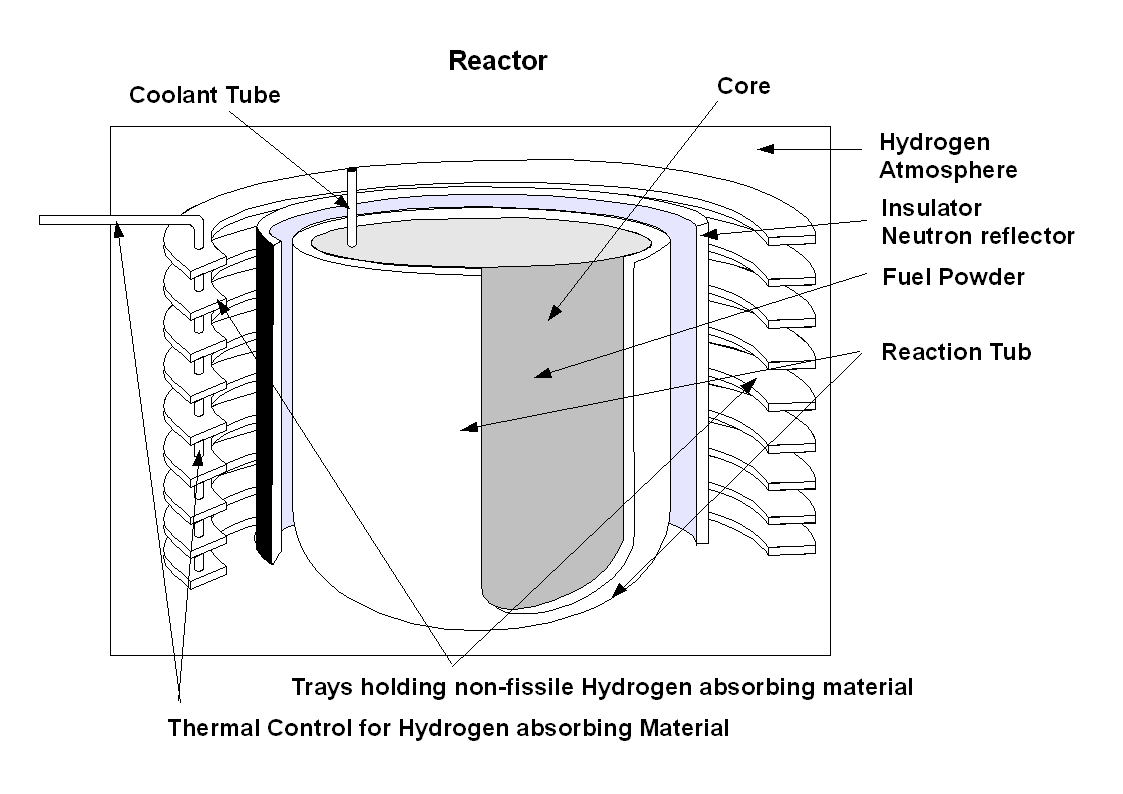
Schematic diagram of an HPM

== Characteristics ==
According to the patent application, the reactor has notable characteristics which set it apart from other reactor designs. It uses uranium hydride (UH_{3}) "low-enriched" to 5% uranium-235—the remainder is uranium-238—as the nuclear fuel, rather than the usual metallic uranium or uranium dioxide that composes the fuel rods of contemporary light-water reactors. In fact, within the application, the contemporary "rod"-based design with fuel rods and control rods is completely omitted from the proposed reactor design in favor of a "tub" design with passive heat pipes conducting heat to the heat exchanger running through the "tub" of granulated uranium hydride. The likely coolant to be used is potassium.

The reactor design in question begins producing power when hydrogen gas at a sufficient temperature and pressure is admitted to the core (made up of granulated uranium metal) and reacts with the uranium metal to form uranium hydride. Uranium hydride is both a nuclear fuel and a neutron moderator; apparently it, like other neutron moderators, will slow neutrons sufficiently to allow for fission reactions to take place; the U-235 atoms within the hydride also serve as the nuclear fuel. Once the nuclear reaction has started, it will continue until it reaches a certain temperature, approximately 800 °C (1,500 °F), where, due to the chemical properties of uranium hydride, it chemically decomposes and turns into hydrogen gas and uranium metal. The loss of neutron moderation due to the chemical decomposition of the uranium hydride will consequently slow—and eventually halt—the reaction. When temperature returns to an acceptable level, the hydrogen will again combine with the uranium metal, forming uranium hydride, restoring moderation and the nuclear reaction will start again.

This makes the reactor a self-regulating, dynamic system, as with a rise in temperature, nuclear reactivity will substantially decrease, and with a fall in temperature, nuclear reactivity will substantially increase. Thus, this reactor design is self-regulating, meltdown is impossible, and the design is inherently safe. From a safety point of view, the design leverages the technology used in the TRIGA reactor, which uses uranium zirconium hydride (UZrH) fuel and is the only reactor licensed by the U.S. Nuclear Regulatory Commission for unattended operation.

According to the reactor design specification, the uranium hydride core is surrounded by hydrogen-absorbing storage trays, made of depleted uranium or thorium. The storage trays can either desorb or absorb the hydrogen gas from the core. During normal operation (with the operating temperature being approximately 550 °C (1,000 °F)), the storage trays are kept at a temperature high enough to expel the hydrogen gas to the core. The storage trays are heated or cooled by means of heat pipes and an external thermal source. Thus, in a steady state, the uranium hydride core is slaved to the temperature of the storage trays. Other heat pipes, protruding from the uranium hydride core, deliver the nuclear-generated heat from the core to a heat exchanger, which in turn can be connected to a steam turbine-generator set, for the production of electricity.

The only hazards are those of all nuclear materials, namely those of radiation, but this is significantly mitigated by the fact that the reactor design is intended to be buried underground and only dug up for refueling every five years, at which point, assuming proper safeguards are used, exposure to radioactivity is a comparatively trivial concern. Spent fuel is also a concern, but this is mitigated due to certain technologies and advantages that make the design in question's used fuel more suitable for nuclear recycling. In particular, the patent application for the design indicates that using a thorium fuel cycle instead of a uranium fuel cycle with this type of reactor will allow far greater recycling potential than presently is found in standard used fuel. Furthermore, the uranium hydride has the capability of a high fuel burnup, of up to 50%, in contrast to a light-water reactor which usually achieves a burnup of 5%.

Reprocessing of spent fuel is simplified and more economical for the hydride reactor design, because the so-called process of zone refining can be used for separation.

Apparently, the proposed reactor design will be capable of supplying 27 MW_{e} of electric power or 70 MW_{th}, weigh 18–20 tons, measure approximately 1.5 meters in diameter, be mass-produced on an assembly line, and be capable of unattended, unrefueled operation for up to seven to ten years at a time. Costs are projected to be competitive with other established sources of energy, like coal, conventional nuclear, and natural gas.

No prototype of this type of reactor has been realized yet, although the nuclear processes have been modeled with MCNP. As the concept of a uranium hydride reactor is novel, further experimental work will be needed with regard to gas flow dynamics, materials selection and performance (especially with regard to hydrogen embrittlement and hydride pyrophoricity), radiation damage, and fission fragment buildup. A further challenge will be posed by the remote temperature control of the storage trays as well as cooling these trays when it may be necessary, so they absorb hydrogen from the core (absorption itself releases heat which first must be evacuated before more hydrogen can be absorbed by the storage trays).

== History ==
The HPM concept is based on work from the 1950s, when the University of California Radiation Laboratory (currently the Lawrence Livermore National Laboratory) required a small nuclear fission device as the ignition charge for a thermonuclear weapon. The aim was to produce an explosion powerful enough to ignite it, while using only the minimum amount of fissile material. This was tried in operation Upshot–Knothole, where hydrogen was used to reduce the critical mass. The test explosions codenamed Ruth and Ray used in the core uranium hydride. Ruth used the hydrogen isotope protium (^{1}H) and Ray used the hydrogen isotope deuterium (^{2}H or ^{2}D) as neutron moderators. The predicted yield was 1.5 to 3 kt TNT for Ruth and 0.5-1 kt TNT for Ray, however the tests produced only a yield of about 200 tons of TNT.

== Commercialization ==
The HPM technology was being developed and commercialized by Hyperion Power Generation, Inc. Hyperion was targeting the volume market for small to medium-sized applications in remote areas for industrial installations and residential installations serving 20,000 (typical US) to 100,000 (typical non-US) households. They claimed that the unit would be deliverable in a sealed container and would be mostly maintenance-free, as the unit was not to be opened on site. The company wanted to mass-produce the units in a factory, deliver them by truck, and take them back for re-processing after 5 to 10 years (depending on power drain).

However, in November 2009, Hyperion Power Generation decided to use a different lead-cooled fast reactor design for its power module, based on uranium nitride, citing the long development and regulatory licensing process for the uranium hydride reactor design.

Hyperion, then rebranded as Gen4 Energy, went out of business on the 1st of April 2018, after losing out on a second round of grants from the Department of Energy in January 2016.
