= Institute of Physics and Power Engineering =

Research institute in the USSR and Russia

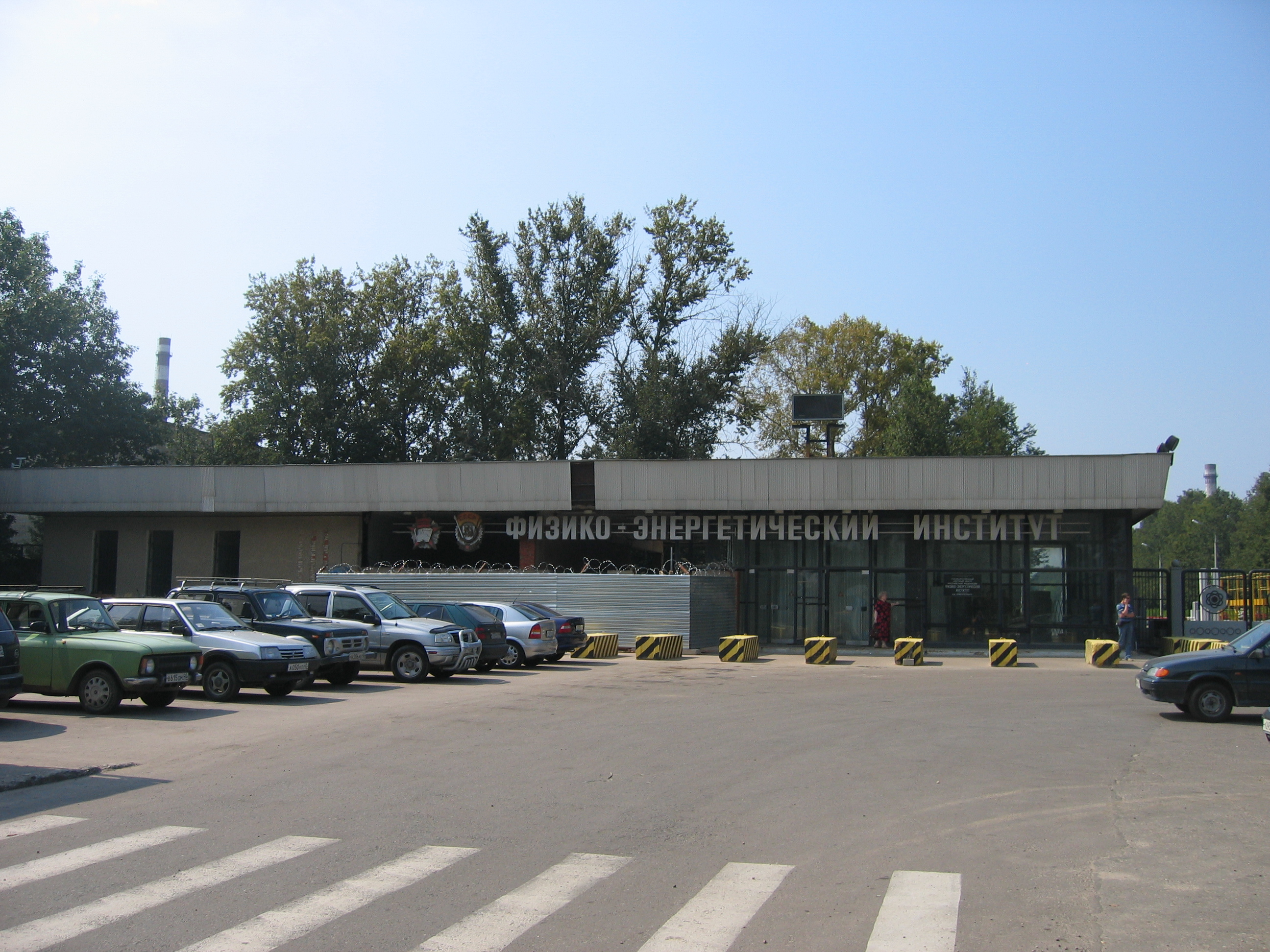
Building of the Institute of Physics and Power Engineering, 2008

Institute of Physics and Power Engineering (full name: I.I. Leypunsky Institute of Physics and Power Engineering, Russian: Государственный научный центр Российской Федерации Физико-энергетический институт, ГНЦ РФ-ФЭИ; IPPE) is a research and development institute in the field of nuclear technology located in Obninsk, Russia. It is a subsidiary of Rosatom.

== History ==
IPPE was established in May 1946 to develop nuclear power technology; it was preceded by First Research Institute Laboratory "V", established 1945, which developed into IPPE. The purpose of the Institute was the development of nuclear reactors and to solve scientific and engineering tasks in the field of nuclear power. The staff of the Institute had built the world's first nuclear power plant in Obninsk, AM-1 ("Атом Мирный", Russian for Atom Mirny, or "peaceful atom"), was commissioned at IPPE on 27 June 1954.

== Developments ==
During its existence the Institute has developed more than 120 different projects, including:

- the fast reactors BR-1, BR-2, BR-5, BR-10;
- the reactor BOR-60 in RIAR (Dimitrovgrad);
- the reactor BN-350 reactor for a nuclear power plant in Aktau (Kazakhstan);
- the reactor BN-600 reactor and BN-800 reactor for Beloyarsk NPP;
- the reactor SVBR-100 reactor;
- space Beech nuclear reactor and TOPAZ nuclear reactor;
- naval lead-bismuth liquid metal reactors: VT-1 reactor, BM-40A reactor, OK-550 reactorl
- mobile nuclear power plant - TES-3 (ТЭС-3)

== International Collaboration ==
The Institute collaborates with the leading scientific and research organizations of Russia, CIS and foreign countries. Among the most international projects can be named:

- involves on a large-scale project: FAIR | FAIR-Russia.
- the cooperation with France concerning the creation of fast reactors;
- joint research with the USA, France, Germany, and Japan concerning reusing ex-nuclear materials of the reactor BH-600;
- joint project development of the fast reactor CEFR with China;
- joint project development of the fast reactor KALIMER with South Korea;
- interested in FBNR project;
