= Soviet submarine K-27 =

Nuclear submarine of the Soviet Navy

History

Soviet Union
- Laid down: 15 June 1958
- Launched: 1 April 1962
- Commissioned: 30 October 1963
- Home port: Gremikha
- Fate: Scuttled on 6 September 1982 off the coast of Novaya Zemlya at 72°31′28″N 55°30′09″E

General characteristics
- Class & type: November-class submarine
- Displacement: 3,420 tons surface; 4,380 tons submerged
- Length: 109.8 m (360 ft 3 in)
- Beam: 8.3 m (27 ft 3 in)
- Draft: 5.8 m (19 ft 0 in)
- Propulsion: Two VT-1 nuclear reactors with lead-bismuth liquid-metal coolants, capable of producing about 73 megawatts apiece
- Speed: 14.7 knots (27.2 km/h; 16.9 mph) surface; 30.2 knots (55.9 km/h; 34.8 mph) submerged
- Range: Unlimited

Service record
- Part of: Soviet Northern Fleet: 17th submarine division

K-27 was the only nuclear submarine of the Soviet Navy's Project 645. It was constructed by placing a pair of experimental VT-1 nuclear reactors that used a liquid-metal coolant (lead-bismuth eutectic) into the modified hull of a Project 627A (November-class) vessel. A unique NATO reporting name was not assigned. On September 6, 1982, the Soviet Navy scuttled it in shallow water in the Kara Sea, contrary to the recommendation of the International Atomic Energy Agency.

== Launch and operations ==
The keel of K-27 was laid down on 15 June 1958 at Severodvinsk Shipyard No. 402. It was launched on 1 April 1962, and went into service as an experimental "attack submarine" on 30 October 1963. K-27 was officially commissioned into the Soviet Northern Fleet on 7 September 1965. K-27 was assigned to the 17th submarine division, headquartered at Gremikha.

The nuclear reactors of K-27 were troublesome from their first criticality, but the K-27 was able to engage in test operations for about five years. On 24 May 1968, the power output of one of her reactors suddenly dropped sharply; radioactive gases were released into her engine room; and the radiation levels throughout K-27 increased dangerously – by 1.5 grays per hour. This radiation consisted mostly of gamma rays and thermal neutrons, with some alpha radiation and beta radiation in addition – generated by the released radioactive gases such as xenon and krypton in her reactor compartment.

The training of the crew by the Soviet Navy had been inadequate, and these sailors did not recognize that their nuclear reactor had suffered from extensive fuel element failures. By the time they gave up their attempts to repair the reactor at sea, nine of the crewmen had accumulated fatal radioactive exposures.

About one-fifth of the reactor core had experienced inadequate cooling caused by uneven coolant flows. Hot spots in the reactor had ruptured, releasing nuclear fuel and nuclear fission products into the liquid-metal coolant, which circulated them throughout her reactor compartment.

K-27 was laid up in Gremikha Bay starting on 20 June 1968. The cooling-off of the reactors and various experimental projects were carried out aboard the submarine through 1973. These included the successful restarting of the starboard reactor up to 40% of maximal power production. Plans were considered to slice off the reactor compartment and replace it with a new one containing standard VM-A water-cooled reactors. The rebuilding or replacement of the nuclear reactor was considered to be too expensive, and also to be inappropriate because more modern nuclear submarines had already entered service in the Soviet Navy.

== Disposal ==
K-27 was officially decommissioned on 1 February 1979. During the summer of 1981 her reactor compartment was filled with a special solidifying mixture of furfuryl alcohol and bitumen, at Severodvinsk shipyard No. 893 "Zvezdochka", to seal the compartment and avoid pollution of the ocean with radioactive products.

K-27 was then towed to a special training area in the western Kara Sea, and scuttled on 6 September 1982, in a fjord at Stepovoy Bay at a depth of just 33 m (108 ft), near position 72°31'28"N., 55°30'09"E. off the northeastern coast of Novaya Zemlya. The bow sank, reaching the sea floor, while the stern remained afloat; a naval salvage tug rammed it to pierce the aft ballast tanks and complete the sinking. This scuttling was performed contrary to the International Atomic Energy Agency's requirement that nuclear-powered submarines and surface ships must be scuttled at depths not less than 3,000 m (9,800 ft).

The last scientific expedition of the Russian Ministry of Emergencies to the Kara Sea examined the site of the scuttling in September 2006. Numerous samples of the seawater, the seafloor, and the sealife were gathered and then analyzed. The final report stated that the radiation levels of the area were stable.

Lessons in nuclear submarine construction and safety learned from Project 645 were applied in Projects 705 and 705K – that produced the Soviet Alfa-class submarines. These were equipped with similar liquid-metal-cooled reactors.

=== Recovery plans ===
Although a joint Russian and Norwegian mission in 2012 did not find alarming levels of radioactivity in the water and soil surrounding the submarine, an urgent consideration pertains to the dismantling of the nuclear reactors should the submarine be raised. Because the reactors were cooled by liquid metals, the nuclear rods became fused with the coolant when the reactors were stopped and conventional methods cannot be used for disassembling the reactors. However, France's Alternative Energies and Atomic Energy Commission designed and donated special equipment for a dedicated dry-dock (SD-10) in Gremikha, which was used to dismantle the Alfa-class submarines that shared this design feature. However, since the last Alfa reactor was dismantled in 2011, this equipment is at risk.

In 2017, plans were again mooted to raise the submarine, by 2022. The Krylov State Research Center of Saint Petersburg announced that it was working on plans for a catamaran floating dock, capable of such heavy lifts from the seabed.

In March 2020, Russian President Vladimir Putin issued a draft decree for an initiative to lift the K-27 and K-159 and four reactor compartments from the Barents Sea.

== See also ==
- List of sunken nuclear submarines
