= SSTAR =

SSTAR or Sstar may refer to:

- Society for Sex Therapy and Research, a professional association
- Small, sealed, transportable, autonomous reactor, a former proposed nuclear reactor
- Sstar, a processor in IBM RS64 line
