= Gen4 Energy =

US company, 2012 to 2018

Hyperion Power Generation, Inc.
- Type: Private
- Industry: Nuclear power
- Founded: March 13, 2012; 14 years ago in Santa Fe, NM, USA
- Defunct: April 1, 2018
- Headquarters: Denver, Colorado
- Key people: Robert E. Prince, CEO; David Carlson, COO/Chief Nuclear Officer
- Website: "Gen4 Energy". gen4energy.com. Archived from the original on 2012-06-01. (original domain usurped by advertisers)

Gen4 Energy, Inc. (formerly Hyperion Power Generation, Inc.) was a privately held corporation formed to construct and sell several designs of relatively small (70 MW thermal, 25 MW electric) nuclear reactors, which they claimed would be modular, inexpensive, inherently safe, and proliferation-resistant. According to news coverage, these reactors could be used for heat generation, production of electricity, and other purposes, including desalination.

The company went out of business on the 1st of April 2018, after losing out on a second round of grants from the Department of Energy in January 2016.

== Early designs ==
Hyperion announced in November 2009 that, despite their continued intentions to pursue the self-moderated uranium hydride reactor, an improvement need for a licensable and deployable reactor were causing them to choose another LANL design for initial commercialization. They shifted focus to a more conventional Generation IV reactor design: a uranium nitride fueled, lead-bismuth cooled reactor. They believed that using a liquid-metal-cooled fast reactor would speed the time to commercialization over the uranium hydride, self-moderating design that had previously been publicly discussed.

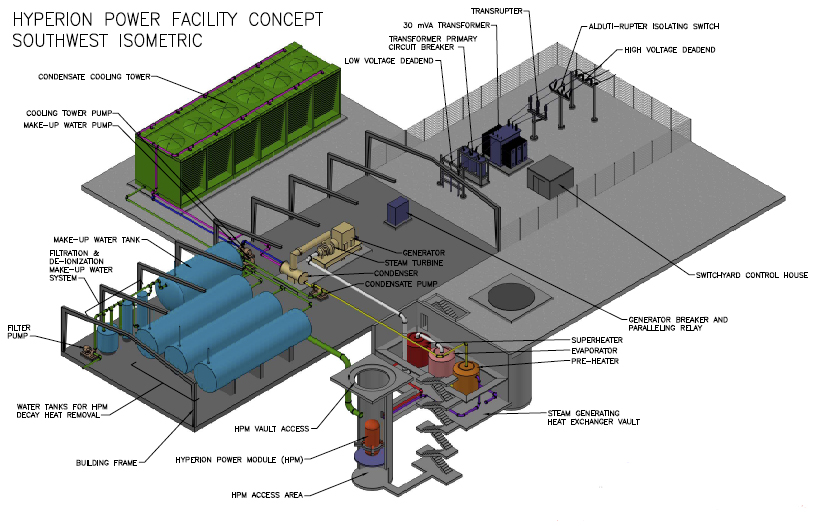
USNRC concept illustration of a Hyperion Power Module plant

According to Hyperion, the uranium nitride fuel incorporated in the design is generally similar in physical characteristics and neutronics to the standard ceramic uranium oxide fuel that is used at present in modern light water nuclear reactors. However, it has certain beneficial traits – higher thermal conductivity – and thus less retained heat energy – that make it preferable over oxide fuels when used at temperature regimes that are greater than the 250 to 300 °C (482 to 572 °F) temperatures found in light water reactors. By operating at higher temperatures, steam plants can operate at a higher thermal efficiency. The presentation by Hyperion at the ANS 2009 conference mentions the use of the Doppler inherent negative temperature coefficient of reactivity in this reactor as a means of control. Nuclear scientist Alexander Sesonske states that nitride fuels have both received very little development (as of 1973) and seem to have a very favorable combination of physical properties – especially in fast reactors. Whether this carries over to lead-bismuth cooled reactors is a question not answered in the reviewed literature, though the Soviet Union has worked with this type of reactor before in naval service; in particular, the Alfa class submarine – well known in the West for its high speed operation – was driven by such a lead-bismuth reactor which is known to have worked very effectively.

The Hyperion module has sufficient fuel for 3,650 full power days at 70 MWh, is capable of load following, and is meant to be built in pairs; one module can be at power, while another can be under installation or uninstallation at the same time.

Hyperion planned to use natural circulation of the lead-bismuth coolant through the reactor module as a means of primary cooling. Coolant temperatures within the primary loop should be approximately 500 °C (932 °F). Powered intermediate heat exchangers, also using lead-bismuth coolant, are located within the reactor and run an intermediate loop going to a third ex-reactor heat exchanger (the steam generator), where heat is transferred to the working fluid, heating it to approximately 480 °C (896 °F). Two schemes of power generation exist at this point: either using superheated steam or supercritical carbon dioxide to drive Rankine cycle or Brayton cycle turbines. In addition to the classical use of power generation, further uses for the heated working fluid can include desalinization, process heat, and district heating and cooling.

The thermal hydraulics of the lead-bismuth reactor are dictated by the high heat capacity and properties of the lead-bismuth eutectic coolant. This coolant is opaque to gamma radiation, but transparent to neutron flux; it melts at a low temperature, but does not boil until an extremely high temperature is reached; it does not greatly expand or contract when exposed to heat or cold; it has a high heat capacity; it will naturally circulate through the reactor core without pumps being required – whether during normal operation or as a means of residual decay heat removal; and it will solidify once decay heat from a used reactor has dropped to a low level.

== Competing designs ==
See List of small nuclear reactor designs

- NuScale
- Toshiba 4S
- mPower by Babcock & Wilcox Company
- TerraPower
