= VT-1 reactor =

Small nuclear fission reactor for naval propulsion cooled by a liquid metal

The VT-1 reactor was the nuclear fission reactor used in a pair to power the K-27 as part of the Soviet Navy's Project 645 Кит-ЖМТ. It is a liquid metal cooled reactor (LMR), using highly enriched uranium-235 fuel to produce 73 MW of power.

K-27 was a November-class first generation nuclear submarine, and the only one of its class fitted with liquid metal cooled reactors. However the seven-member Alfa class were subsequently fitted with liquid metal cooled reactors. Its usage in the K-27 led to a nuclear incident with 9 fatalities.

It was developed by OKB Gidropress in cooperation with IPPE.

== See also ==
- United States Naval reactors
- Naval Reactors
