= MYRRHA =

Design project of a nuclear reactor coupled to a proton accelerator

MYRRHA Reactor vessel, cutaway view

The MYRRHA (Multi-purpose hYbrid Research Reactor for High-tech Applications) is a design project of a nuclear reactor coupled to a proton accelerator. This makes it an accelerator-driven system (ADS). MYRRHA will be a lead-bismuth cooled fast reactor with two possible configurations: sub-critical or critical.

The project is managed by SCK CEN, the Belgian Centre for Nuclear Research. Its design will be adapted as a function of the experience gained from a first research project with a small proton accelerator and a lead-bismuth eutectic target: GUINEVERE.

MYRRHA is anticipated to be constructed in 2036, with a first phase (100 MeV LINAC accelerator) expected to be completed in 2026 if successfully demonstrated.

== Concept ==
In a traditional power-generating nuclear reactor, the nuclear fuel is arranged in such a way that the two or three neutrons released from a fission event will induce one other atom in the fuel to fission. This is known as criticality. To maintain this precise balance, a number of control systems are used like control rods and neutron poisons. In most such designs, a loss of control can lead to a runaway reaction, heating the fuel until it melts. Various feedback systems and active controls prevent this.

The concept behind a number of advanced reactor designs is to arrange the fuel so it is always below criticality. Under normal conditions, this would lead to it rapidly "turning off" as the neutron counts continue to fall. In order to produce power, some other source of neutrons has to be provided. In most designs, these are provided from a second much smaller reactor running on a neutron-rich fuel, like highly enriched uranium. This is the basis for the fast breeder reactor and similar designs. In order for this to work, the reactor generally has to use a coolant that has a low neutron cross-section, water will slow the neutrons down too much. Typical coolants for fast reactors are sodium or lead-bismuth.

In the accelerator driven reactor, these extra neutrons are instead provided by a particle accelerator. These produce protons which are shot into a target, normally a heavy metal. The energy of the protons causes neutrons to be knocked off the atoms in the target, a process known as neutron spallation. These neutrons are then fed into the reactor, making up the number needed to bring the reactor back to criticality. The MYRRHA design uses the lead-bismuth cooling fuel as the target, shooting the protons directly into the reactor core.

== Components ==
MYRRHA is a project presently under development of a research reactor aiming to demonstrate the feasibility of the ADS and the lead-cooled fast reactor concepts, with various research applications from spent-fuel irradiation to material irradiation testing. A linear accelerator is under development to provide a beam of fast protons that hits a spallation target, producing neutrons. These neutrons are necessary to keep the nuclear reactor running when operated in sub-critical mode, but to increase its versatility the reactor is also designed to operate in critical mode with fast neutron and thermal neutron zones.

=== Accelerator ===
The accelerator will accelerate protons to an energy of 600 MeV with a beam current of up to 4 mA. In subcritical mode, if the accelerator stops the reactor power drops immediately. To avoid thermal cycles the accelerator needs to be extremely reliable. MYRRHA aims at no more than 10 outages longer than three seconds per 100 days. A first prototype stage of the accelerator was started in 2020.

The accelerator and two targets are called Minerva, and construction was started in 2024.

=== ISOL@MYRRHA ===
The high reliability and intense beam current required for operating such a machine makes the proton accelerator potentially interesting for online isotope separation. Phase I of the project therefore also includes the design and feasibility study of ISOL@MYRRHA to investigate exotic isotopes.

=== Spallation target ===
The protons collide with a liquid lead-bismuth eutectic. The high atomic number of the target leads to a large number of neutrons via spallation.

=== Reactor ===
The pool type, or the loop type, reactor will be cooled by a lead-bismuth eutectic. Separated into a fast neutron zone and a thermal neutron zone, the reactor is planned to use a mixed oxide of uranium and plutonium (with 35 wt. % PuO_{2}).

Two operating modes are foreseen: critical and sub-critical.

In sub-critical mode, the reactor is planned to run with a criticality under 0.95: On average a fission reaction will induce less than one additional fission reaction, the reactor does not have enough fissile material to sustain a chain reaction on its own and relies on the neutrons from the spallation target. As additional safety feature the reactor can be passively cooled when the accelerator is switched off.

== See also ==
- ASTRID
- Fast breeder reactor
- Fast neutron reactor
- Gas-cooled fast reactor
- Generation IV reactor
- Integral Fast Reactor
- Sodium-cooled fast reactor
