= LCFR =

LCFR may refer to:

- Lead-cooled fast reactor, a type of fast neutron reactor
- Liberty City Free Radio, a radio station in the video game Grand Theft Auto: Liberty City Stories
- Liquid Chloride Fast Reactor, a type of molten salt reactor
