= Metal-induced embrittlement =

Embrittlement caused by diffusion of metal in a base metal

Metal-induced embrittlement (MIE) is the embrittlement caused by diffusion of metal, either solid or liquid, into the base material. Metal induced embrittlement occurs when metals are in contact with low-melting point metals while under tensile stress. The embrittler can be either solid (SMIE) or liquid (liquid metal embrittlement). Under sufficient tensile stress, MIE failure occurs instantaneously at temperatures just above melting point. For temperatures below the melting temperature of the embrittler, solid-state diffusion is the main transport mechanism. This occurs in the following ways:

- Diffusion through grain boundaries near the crack of matrix
- Diffusion of first monolayer heterogeneous surface embrittler atoms
- Second monolayer heterogenous surface diffusion of embrittler
- Surface diffusion of the embrittler over a layer of embrittler

The main mechanism of transport for SMIE is surface self-diffusion of the embrittler over a layer of embrittler that’s thick enough to be characterized as self-diffusion at the crack tip. In comparison, LMIE dominant mechanism is bulk liquid flow that penetrates at the tips of cracks.

== Examples ==
Studies have shown that Zn, Pb, Cd, Sn and In can embrittle steel at temperature below each embrittler’s melting point.

- Cadmium can embrittle titanium at temperatures below its melting point.
- Hg can embrittle zinc at temperatures below its melting point.
- Hg can embrittle copper at temperatures below its melting point.

== Mechanics and temperature dependence ==
Similar to liquid metal embrittlement, solid metal-induced embrittlement results in a decrease in fracture strength of a material. In addition, a decrease in tensile ductility over a temperature range is indicative of metal-induced embrittlement. Although SMIE is greatest just below the embrittler’s melting temperature, the range over which SMIE occurs ranges from 0.75 × T_{m} to T_{m}, where T_{m} is the melting temperature of the embrittler. The reduction in ductility is caused by formation and propagation of stable, subcritical intergranular cracks. SMIE produces both intergranular and transgranular fracture surfaces in otherwise ductile materials.

== Kinetics of crack onset and propagation via SMIE ==
Crack extension, as opposed to crack onset, is the rate determining step for solid induced-metal embrittlement. The main mechanism leading to solid metal induced embrittlement is multilayer surface self-diffusion of the embrittler at the crack tip. Propagation rate of a crack undergoing metal-induced embrittlement is a function of the supply of embrittler present at the crack tip. Crack velocities in SMIE are much slower than LMIE velocities. Catastrophic failure of a material via SMIE occurs as a result of the propagation of cracks to a critical point. To this end, the propagation of the crack is controlled by the transport rate and mechanisms of the embrittler at the tip of nucleated cracks. SMIE can be mitigated by increasing the tortuosity of crack paths such that resistance to intergranular cracking increases.

== Susceptibility ==
SMIE is less common that LMIE and much less common that other failure mechanisms such as hydrogen embrittlement, fatigue, and stress-corrosion cracking. Still, embrittlement mechanisms can be introduced during fabrication, coatings, testing or during service of the material components. Susceptibility for SMIE increases with the following material characteristics:

- Increase in strength of high-strength material
- Increasing grain size
- Materials with more planar-slip than wavy-slip
