= OKB Gidropress =

Russian state-owned nuclear reactor designer

OKB Gidropress JSC
- Type: Joint-stock company
- Founded: 1946
- Headquarters: Podolsk, Russia
- Products: Nuclear reactors
- Parent: Rosatom
- Website: www.gidropress.podolsk.ru

OKB Gidropress (Russian: ОКБ Гидропресс) is a Russian state construction office which works on the design, analysis, development, and production of nuclear power plant reactors, most notably the VVER range. OKB stands for experimental design bureau (опытно-конструкторское бюро, opytno-konstruktorskoe bjuro).

== History ==
The company was established by the decree of Council of People's Commissars of the USSR on January 28, 1946 by the order of the People’s Commissar of the USSR heavy engineering on February 1, 1946.

In 1958, under an OKB project, equipment was manufactured for “Stand 27/VT,” a land-based prototype of a liquid metal cooled reactor for Project 645 atomic submarines, built in Obninsk at the industrial site of the Institute of Physics and Power Engineering. In 1961, the creators of the stand were awarded the Lenin Prize.

== Reactors ==
A list of some reactors under her flagship or participation:

1. VVER and its variants
2. VKT-12
3. SVBR-10
4. SVBR-100
5. Angstrem
6. VT-1 reactor
7. BM-40A reactor
8. BREST-OD-300
9. BN-800 reactor
10. BN-1200 reactor
