= Embrittlement =

Loss of ductility of a material, making it brittle

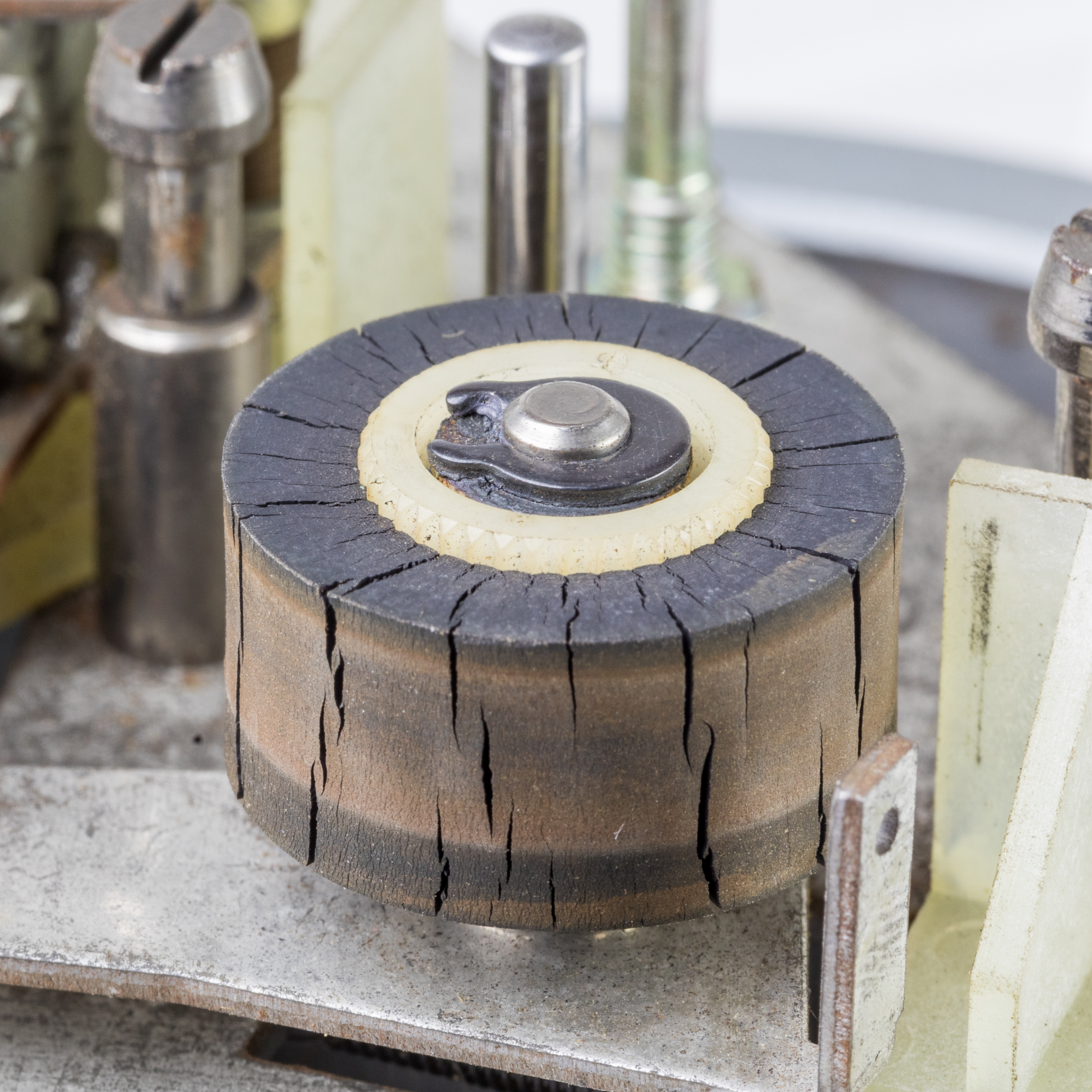
Embrittled pinch roller

Embrittlement is a significant decrease of ductility of a material, which makes the material brittle. Embrittlement is used to describe any phenomena where the environment compromises a stressed material's mechanical performance, such as temperature or environmental composition. This is oftentimes undesirable as brittle fracture occurs quicker and can much more easily propagate than ductile fracture, leading to complete failure of the equipment. Various materials have different mechanisms of embrittlement, therefore it can manifest in a variety of ways, from slow crack growth to a reduction of tensile ductility and toughness.

== Mechanisms ==
Embrittlement is a series complex mechanism that is not completely understood. The mechanisms can be driven by temperature, stresses, grain boundaries, or material composition. However, by studying the embrittlement process, preventative measures can be put in place to mitigate the effects. There are several ways to study the mechanisms. During metal embrittlement (ME), crack-growth rates can be measured. Computer simulations can also be used to enlighten the mechanisms behind embrittlement. This is helpful for understanding hydrogen embrittlement (HE), as the diffusion of hydrogen through materials can be modeled. The embrittler does not play a role in final fracture; it is mostly responsible for crack propagation. Cracks must first nucleate. Most embrittlement mechanisms can cause fracture transgranularly or intergranularly. For metal embrittlement, only certain combinations of metals, stresses, and temperatures are susceptible. This is contrasted to stress-corrosion cracking where virtually any metal can be susceptible given the correct environment. Yet this mechanism is much slower than that of liquid metal embrittlement (LME), suggesting that it directs a flow of atoms both towards and away from the crack. For neutron embrittlement, the main mechanism is collisions within the material from the fission byproducts.

== Embrittlement of metals ==
=== Hydrogen embrittlement ===
One of the most well discussed, and detrimental, embrittlement is hydrogen embrittlement in metals. There are multiple ways that hydrogen atoms can diffuse into metals, including from environment or during processing (e.g. electroplating). The exact mechanism that causes hydrogen embrittlement is still not determined, but many theories are proposed and are still undergoing verification. Hydrogen atoms are likely to diffuse to grain boundaries of metals, which becomes a barrier for dislocation motion and builds up stress near the atoms. When the metal is stressed, the stress is concentrated near the grain boundaries due to hydrogen atoms, allowing a crack to nucleate and propagate along the grain boundaries to relieve the built-up stress.

There are many ways to prevent or reduce the impact of hydrogen embrittlement in metals. One of the more conventional ways is to place coatings around the metal, which will act as diffusion barriers that prevents hydrogen from being introduced from the environment into the material. Another way is to add traps or absorbers in the alloy which takes into the hydrogen atom and forms another compound.

=== 475 °C embrittlement ===
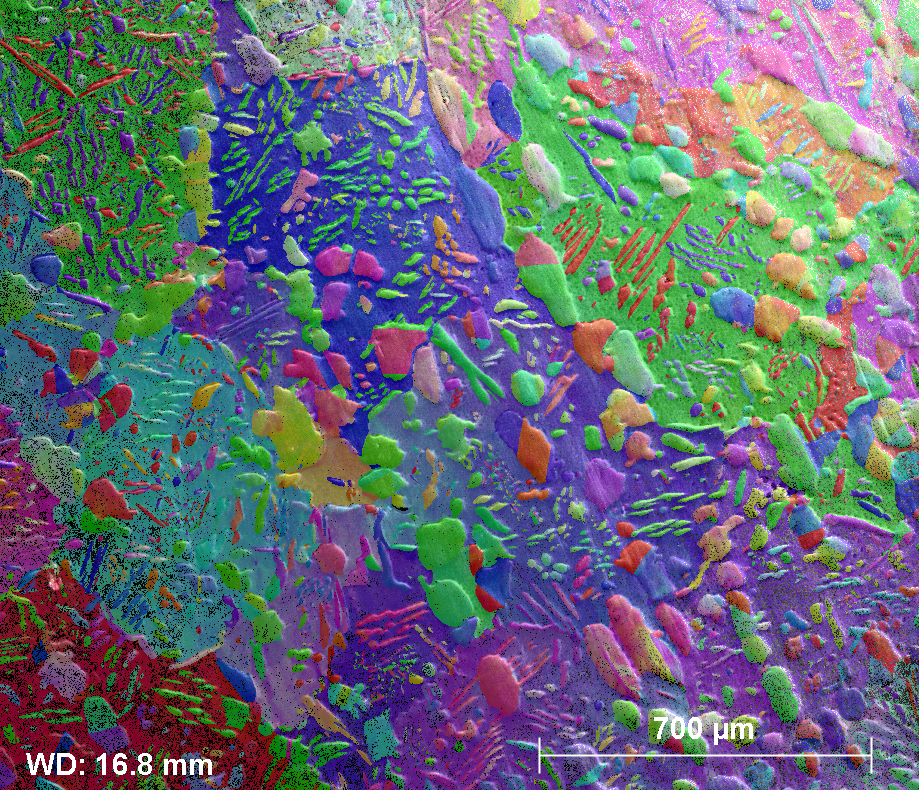
Electron backscatter diffraction map of 128hrs age hardened DSS with the ferrite phase formaing the matrix and austenite grains sporadically spread

Duplex stainless steel is widely used in industry because it possesses excellent oxidation resistance, but it can have limited toughness due to its large ferritic grain size and embrittlement tendencies at temperatures ranging from 280 to 500 °C, especially at 475 °C, where spinodal decomposition of the supersaturated solid ferrite solution into Fe-rich nanophase ($\acute{a}$) and Cr-rich nanophase ($\acute{a}\acute{}$), accompanied by G-phase precipitation, occurs, which makes the ferrite phase a preferential initiation site for micro-cracks.

=== Radiation embrittlement ===
Radiation embrittlement, also known as neutron embrittlement, is a phenomenon more commonly observed in reactors and nuclear plants as these materials are constantly exposed to a steady amount of radiation. When a neutron irradiates the metal, voids are created in the material, which is known as void swelling. If the material is under creep (under low strain rate and high temperature condition), the voids will coalesce into vacancies which compromises the mechanical strength of the workpiece.

=== Low temperature embrittlement ===
At low temperatures, some metals can undergo a ductile-brittle transition which makes the material brittle and could lead to catastrophic failure during operation. This temperature is commonly called a ductile-brittle transition temperature or embrittlement temperature. Research has shown that low temperature embrittlement and brittle fracture only occurs under these specific criteria:

1. There is enough stress to nucleate a crack.
2. The stress at the crack exceeds a critical value that will open up the crack (also known as Griffith's criterion for crack opening).
3. High resistance to dislocation movement.
4. There should be a small amount of viscous drag of dislocation to ensure opening of crack.

All metals can fulfill criteria 1, 2, 4. However, only BCC and some HCP metals meets the third condition as they have high Peierl's barrier and strong energy of elastic interaction of dislocation and defects. All FCC and most HCP metals have low Peierl's barrier and weak elastic interaction energy. Plastics and rubbers also exhibit the same transition at low temperatures.

Historically, there are multiple instances where people are operating equipment at cold temperatures that led to unexpected, but also catastrophic, failure. In Cleveland in 1944, a cylindrical steel tank containing liquefied natural gas ruptured because of its low ductility at the operating temperature. Another famous example was the unexpected fracture of 160 World War II liberty ships during winter months. The crack was formed at the middle of the ships and propagated through, breaking the ships in half quite literally.

Embrittlement temperatures
Material	Temperature [°F]	Temperature [°C]
Plastics
ABS	−270	−168
Acetal	−300	−184.4
Delrin	-275 to -300	-171 to -184
Nylon	-275 to -300	-171 to -184
Polytron	−300	−184.4
Polypropylene	-300 to -310	-184 to -190
Polytetrafluoroethylene	−275	−171
Rubbers
Buna-N	−225	−143
EPDM	-275 to -300	-171 to -184
Ethylene propylene	-275 to -300	-171 to -184
Hycar	-210 to -275	-134 to -171
Natural rubber	-225 to -275	-143 to -171
Neoprene	-225 to -300	-143 to -184
Nitrile	-275 to -310	-171 to -190
Nitrile-butadiene (ABS)	-250 to -270	-157 to -168
Silicone	−300	−184.4
Urethane	-275 to -300	-171 to -184
Viton	-275 to -300	-171 to -184
Metals
Zinc	−200	−129
Steel	−100	−73

=== Other types of embrittlement ===
- Stress corrosion cracking (SCC) is the embrittlement caused by exposure to aqueous, corrosive materials. It relies on both a corrosive environment and the presence of tensile (not compressive) stress.
- Sulfide stress cracking is the embrittlement caused by absorption of hydrogen sulfide.
- Adsorption embrittlement is the embrittlement caused by wetting.
- Liquid metal embrittlement (LME) is the embrittlement caused by liquid metals.
- Metal-induced embrittlement (MIE) is the embrittlement caused by diffusion of atoms of metal, either solid or liquid, into the material. For example, cadmium coating on high-strength steel, which was originally done to prevent corrosion.
- Grain boundary segregation can cause brittle intergranular fracture. During solidification the grain boundaries end up as the repository for the impurities in the alloy by segregation. This grain boundary segregation can create a network of low-toughness paths through the material.
- The primary embrittlement mechanism of plastics is gradual loss of plasticizers, usually by overheating or aging.
- The primary embrittlement mechanism of asphalt is by oxidation, which is most severe in warmer climates. Asphalt pavement embrittlement (a.k.a. crocodile cracking) can lead to various forms of cracking patterns, including longitudinal, transverse, and block (hexagonal). Asphalt oxidation is related to polymer degradation, as these materials bear similarities in their chemical composition.

== Embrittlement of inorganic glasses and ceramics ==
The mechanisms of embrittlement are similar to those of metals. Inorganic glass embrittlement can be manifested via static fatigue. Embrittlement in glasses, such as Pyrex, is a function of humidity. Growth rate of cracks vary linearly with humidity, suggesting a first-order kinetic relationship. The static fatigue of Pyrex by this mechanism requires dissolution to be concentrated at the tip of the crack. If the dissolution is uniform along the crack flat surfaces, the crack tip will be blunted. This blunting can actually increase the fracture strength of the material by 100 times.

The embrittlement of SiC/alumina composites serves as an instructive example. The mechanism for this system is primarily the diffusion of oxygen into the material through cracks in the matrix. The oxygen reaches the SiC fibers and produces silicate. Stress concentrates around the newly formed silicate and the fibers' strength is degraded. This ultimately leads to fracture at stresses less than the material's typical fracture stress.

== Embrittlement of polymers ==
Polymers come in a wide variety of compositions, and this diversity of chemistry results in wide-ranging embrittlement mechanisms. The most common sources of polymer embrittlement include oxygen in the air, water in liquid or vapor form, ultraviolet radiation from the sun, acids, and organic solvents.

One of the ways these sources alter the mechanical properties of polymers is through chain scission and chain cross-linking. Chain scission occurs when atomic bonds are broken in the main chain, so environments with elements such as solar radiation lead to this form of embrittlement. Chain scission reduces the length of the polymer chains in a material, resulting in a reduction of strength. Chain cross-linking has the opposite effect. An increase in the number of cross-links (due to an oxidative environment for example), results in stronger, less ductile material.

The thermal oxidation of polyethylene provides a quality example of chain scission embrittlement. The random chain scission induced a change from ductile to brittle behavior once the average molar mass of the chains dropped below a critical value. For the polyethylene system, embrittlement occurred when the weight average molar mass fell below 90 kg/mol. The reason for this change was hypothesized to be a reduction of entanglement and an increase in crystallinity. The ductility of polymers is typically a result of their amorphous structure, so an increase in crystallinity makes the polymer more brittle. In the case of polyethylene terephthalate, hydrolysis produces chain scission embrittlement. It has been demonstrated that the degradation of the mechanical properties correlates with the reduction of the mobile amorphous fraction (MAF), and that the ductile-to-brittle transition occurs when the minimum MAF is reached. This supports a micromechanical interpretation of the embrittlement mechanism rather than a molecular interpretation.

The embrittlement of silicone rubber is due to an increase in the amount of chain cross-linking. When silicone rubber is exposed to air at temperatures above 250 °C (482 °F) oxidative cross-linking reactions occur at methyl side groups along the main chain. These cross-links make the rubber significantly less ductile.

Solvent stress cracking is a significant polymer embrittlement mechanism. It occurs when liquids or gasses are absorbed into the polymer, ultimately swelling the system. The polymer swelling results in less shear flow and an increase in crazing susceptibility. Solvent stress cracking from organic solvents typically results in static fatigue because of the low mobility of fluids. Solvent stress cracking from gasses is more likely to result in greater crazing susceptibility.

Polycarbonate provides a good example of solvent stress cracking. Numerous solvents have been shown to embrittle polycarbonate (i.e. benzene, toluene, acetone) through a similar mechanism. The solvent diffuses into the bulk, swells the polymer, induces crystallization, and ultimately produces interfaces between ordered and disordered regions. These interfaces produce voids and stress fields that can be propagated throughout the material at stresses much lower than the typical tensile strength of the polymer.
