= Fixed Bed Nuclear Reactor =

Passively cooled nuclear reactor

The Fixed Bed Nuclear Reactor (FBNR) is a simple, small, proliferation resistant, inherently safe and passively cooled nuclear reactor with reduced environmental impact. The reactor is being developed under the auspice of the International Atomic Energy Agency. Its science and technology is in the public domain.

The main developer of the Fixed Bed Nuclear Reactor is the Federal University of Rio Grande do Sul. Several international institutions have shown interest in participating in this project, including Imperial College of the University of London, Institute of Theoretical and Experimental Physics (ITEP) and the Institute of Physics and Power Engineering (IPPE) in the Russian Federation.

The design underwent 3D analysis and testing and results were published in 2020.
