= Newcleo =

Nuclear energy company

newcleo
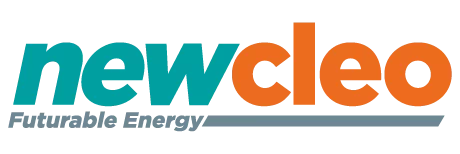
- Type: Private
- Industry: Nuclear power, nuclear fuel
- Founded: September 2021
- Headquarters: Paris, France
- Key people: Stefano Buono (CEO and chairman), Luciano Cinotti (chief scientific officer), Elisabeth Rizzotti (chief operating officer, managing director Italy)
- Number of employees: ~1,000
- Website: www.newcleo.com

newcleo is a European nuclear energy company developing small modular lead-cooled fast reactors using mixed oxide fuel (MOX). Headquartered in Paris and founded in 2021, as of May 2026 newcleo has raised over €780 million in capital.

Headed by CEO and chairman Stefano Buono, the company is based in France, with further locations in Italy, UK, Switzerland, Belgium, and Slovakia, employing approximately 1,000 people.

== History ==
In September 2021, Stefano Buono, Luciano Cinotti, and Elisabeth Rizzotti founded newcleo. The company acquired Hydromine Nuclear Energy, created in 2013 to design the LFR-AS-200 and LFR-TL-30 reactors, and successfully raised €100 million in capital. Six months later, the company entered into a technological partnership with ENEA, an Italian Government research agency, and raised another €300 million.

During the Choose France summit in May 2023, the company announced plans for up to €3 billion in investments in France by 2030. The following month, newcleo was awarded funding as part of the France 2030 call for projects. In July, newcleo partnered with Fincantieri and RINA for a feasibility study for naval propulsion. In October, the company acquired SRS-Fucina, which specialises in liquid lead systems. Additionally, a cooperation and an investment agreement were established with the Tosto Group. The following month newcleo participated in the World Nuclear Exhibition (WNE) and entered partnerships with Assystem, Ingérop, and Onet. In December, newcleo purchased the Rütschi Group, a nuclear pump manufacturer. The company also launched its first experimental facility, known as CAPSULE.

In January 2024, newcleo signed an agreement with MAIRE for hydrogen and chemicals production. The same month, it also secured a contract with Nuclear Transport Solutions (NTS) to support its logistics needs. By April, newcleo had submitted its Regulatory Justification in the UK and formed a partnership with CEA, France's Alternative Energies and Atomic Energy Commission. The company also launched its second experimental facility, CORE-1. In May 2024, it joined the European Industrial Alliance on Small Modular Reactors. In August, newcleo had signed a cooperation agreement with Slovak nuclear company VUJE to advance nuclear technology development. In September 2024, the company entered into an agreement with Saipem to explore offshore applications. newcleo also relocated its holding headquarters from London to Paris. In October, newcleo's lead-cooled fast reactor (LFR) was selected by the European Industrial Alliance on Small Modular Reactors as one of the projects to receive support. The company also announced more partnerships, on recycled nuclear fuel.

In January 2025, newcleo signed further agreements, with Slovak nuclear companies JAVYS and VUJE. The first agreement, with JAVYS, outlines a joint venture (51% JAVYS, 49% newcleo) for the construction of up to four LFR-AS-200 reactors at Jaslovské Bohunice V1, as well as the development of a nuclear fuel supply chain. The project aims to integrate spent nuclear fuel recycling, supported by newcleo's planned fuel manufacturing facility in France, to reduce nuclear waste disposal needs. The second agreement, with VUJE, sets a framework for cooperation in developing LFR technology in Slovakia, with VUJE contributing its expertise in construction and commissioning, starting with feasibility studies. In February, newcleo has initiated the land acquisition process for its first LFR-AS-30 reactor in the Chinon Vienne et Loire community of municipalities in France, aiming to build a 30 MWe reactor by 2031.

On 26 May 2026, US-based company Oklo Inc. was selected by the US Department of Energy (DoE) for advanced talks to join the Surplus Plutonium Utilization Program. The program converts designated surplus plutonium material into fuel for advanced reactors, and Oklo paired it with a partnership with newcleo that could bring up to $2 billion in project capital, subject to definitive agreements. Newcleo plans to build a fuel manufacturing facility in the US in partnership with Oklo to supply mixed oxide fuel (MOX) to newcleo's reactors.

On 27 May, newcleo CEO Stefano Buono announced that the company would become publicly listed on the Nasdaq through a business combination agreement with Newhold Investment Corp. III. Newcleo expects to complete construction of a 10 megawatt-thermal non-nuclear prototype reactor in 2026 in Brasimone, Italy. As of May 2026, the company is still working on the basic design of its 200 megawatt-electric commercial LFR-200 reactor, but plans to complete its first deployment in the US in 2032. As of May 2026, Newcleo is working on the detailed design of a MOX fuel fabrication facility, and plans to have a first facility completed in the US or France by 2031, at an estimated capital cost of approximately $2.4 billion. Newcleo plans to act as operator of its reactors for clients with no prior nuclear expertise, and is exploring joint ventures with off-takers such as data center clients.

== Technology ==
The lead-cooled fast reactors newcleo designs are small modular reactors (SMRs), which proponents hope to have cost and flexibility advantages over large conventional reactors. The coolant is liquid lead, and its reactors are designed to fission heavy elements, allowing them to recycle material that conventional light-water reactors cannot.

Newcleo plans to use mixed oxide fuel (MOX) composed of uranium oxide and plutonium oxide to potentially reduce the need for new uranium mining while also managing long-lasting nuclear waste more effectively. The plutonium used to produce MOX fuel is often sourced from reprocessing spent nuclear fuel, though MOX production can also be a way of utilizing surplus weapons-grade plutonium. Newcleo has not made public any plans to conduct its own reprocessing, but plans to reprocess spent fuel from its own MOX-fuelled reactors to create further MOX fuel, in a strategy it calls "multi-recycling."

== See also ==
- Nuclear power
- Nuclear reactor
- Nuclear physics
- Nuclear engineering
