= Small, sealed, transportable, autonomous reactor =

Proposed nuclear reactor currently undergoing development in the U.S.

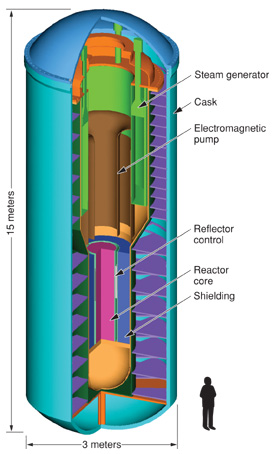
Reactor Overview

Small, sealed, transportable, autonomous reactor (SSTAR) was a proposed lead-cooled nuclear reactor primarily researched and developed in the United States by Lawrence Livermore National Laboratory.

== Design ==
It is designed as a fast breeder reactor that is passively safe. It has a self-contained fuel source of uranium-235 and uranium-238 which will be partly consumed by fast-neutron fission and, more importantly, converted into more fissile material ("breeding" plutonium). It should have an operative life of 30 years, providing a constant power source between 10 and 100 megawatts.

The 100 megawatt version is expected to be 15 meters high by 3 meters wide, and weigh 500 tonnes. A 10 megawatt version is expected to weigh less than 200 tonnes. To obtain the desired 30 year life span, the design calls for a movable neutron reflector to be placed surrounding part of a column of fuel. The reflector's slow downward travel through the entire length of the column would cause the fuel to be burned from the top of the column to the bottom. Because the unit will be sealed, it is expected that a breeder reaction will be used to further extend the life of the fuel.

They are being researched as a possible replacement for today's light water reactors and as a possible design for use in developing countries (which would use the reactor for several decades and then return the entire unit to the manufacturing country).

A prototype was scheduled for manufacture in 2015. However its development seems to have ended.
