= Tactical speed =

Tactical speed is the highest speed of a submarine at which the boat is quiet enough for detecting other ships.

Tactical speed is limited by the acoustic noise generated by the ship itself, which affects the ability to detect external sources of sound. One of the main contributors to internal sources of noise is the propulsion system.

Tactical speed for modern submarines with nuclear propulsion is at the level of 8–13 knots, but the newest ships of IV generation can achieve tactical speeds over 20 knots.

The actual maximum speed of a submarine can be much greater than its tactical speed. For instance, the maximum speed (when submerged) of USS Scranton (SSN-756) is 33 knots, whereas its tactical speed is only 12 knots.
