= Alfa-class submarine =

Nuclear-powered attack submarine class

- Alfa-class SSN profile

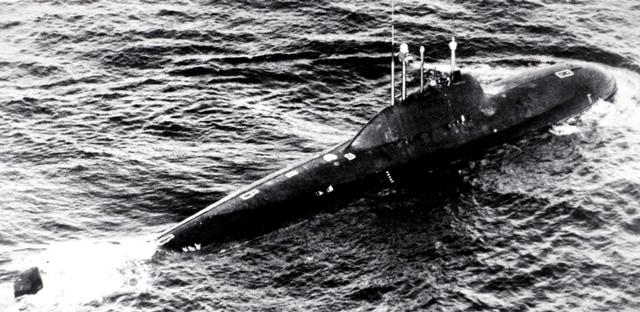
- An Alfa-class submarine underway

Class overview
- Name: Project 705 Lyre
- Operators: Soviet Navy; Russian Navy
- Preceded by: Victor class
- Succeeded by: Sierra class, Akula class
- Built: 1968–1981
- In service: 1971–1996
- Planned: 8
- Completed: 7
- Canceled: 1
- Retired: 7

General characteristics
- Type: Nuclear attack submarine
- Displacement: 2,300 tons surfaced; 3,200 tons submerged
- Length: 81.4 m (267 ft)
- Beam: 9.5 m (31 ft)
- Draught: 7.6 m (25 ft)
- Propulsion: OK-550 or BM-40A, 155-MWt Lead-bismuth cooled, beryllium-moderated reactor; 40,000 shp (30,000 kW) steam turbine, one shaft
- Speed: 12 kn (14 mph; 22 km/h) surfaced; 41 knots (47 mph; 76 km/h) submerged
- Test depth: 350 m (1,148 ft) test
- Complement: 31 (all officers)
- Armament: 6 × 533 mm (21 in) torpedo tubes (bow): 18 SET-65 or 53-65K torpedoes; 20 VA-111 Shkval torpedoes; 24 mines

The Alfa class, Soviet designation Project 705 Lira (Russian: Лира, meaning "Lyre", NATO reporting name Alfa), was a class of nuclear-powered attack submarines in service with the Soviet Navy from 1971 into the early 1990s, with one serving in the Russian Navy until 1996. They were among the fastest military submarines ever built, with only the prototype submarine K-222 (NATO reporting name Papa-class) exceeding them in submerged speed.

The Project 705 submarines had a unique design among other submarines. In addition to the revolutionary use of titanium for its hull, it used a powerful lead-bismuth liquid metal cooled reactor as a power source, which greatly reduced the size of the reactor compared to conventional designs, thus reducing the overall size of the submarine, and allowing for very high speeds. However, it also meant that the reactor had a short lifetime and had to be kept warm when it was not being used. As a result, the submarines were used as interceptors, mostly kept in port ready for a high-speed dash into the North Atlantic.

== Design and development ==
=== Preproduction ===
Project 705 was first proposed in 1957 by M. G. Rusanov and the initial design work led by Rusanov began in May 1960 in Leningrad with design task assigned to SKB-143, one of the two predecessors (the other being TsKB-16) of the Malakhit Design Bureau.

The project was highly innovative in order to meet demanding requirements: sufficient speed to successfully pursue any ship; the ability to avoid anti-submarine weapons and to ensure success in underwater combat; low detectability, in particular to airborne MAD arrays, and also especially to active sonars; minimal displacement; and minimal crew complement.

A special titanium alloy hull would be used to create a small, low drag, 1,500 ton, six compartment vessel capable of very high speeds (in excess of 40 knots (46 mph; 74 km/h)) and deep diving. The submarine would operate as an interceptor, staying in harbor or on patrol route and then racing out to reach an approaching fleet. A high-power liquid metal cooled nuclear reactor was devised, which was kept liquid in port through external heating. Extensive automation would also greatly reduce the needed crew numbers to just 16 men.

The practical problems with the design quickly became apparent and in 1963 the design team was replaced and a less radical design was proposed, increasing all main dimensions and the vessel weight by 800 tons and almost doubling the crew.

A prototype of a similar design, the Project 661 or K-162 (since 1978 K-222) cruise missile submarine (referred to by NATO as the Papa class), was built at the SEVMASH shipyard in Severodvinsk and completed in 1972. The long build time was caused by numerous design flaws and difficulties in manufacture. Extensively tested, she was taken out of service following a reactor accident in 1980. She had a top speed of 41.2 knots (47.4 mph; 76.3 km/h) and a test depth of 400 m (1,300 ft). This combined with other reports created some alarm in the U.S. Navy and prompted the rapid development of the ADCAP torpedo program and the Sea Lance missile programs projects (the latter was cancelled when more definitive information about the Soviet project was known). The creation of the high-speed Spearfish torpedo by the Royal Navy was also a response to the threat posed by the reported capabilities of submarines of the Project 705.

=== Production ===
Production started in 1964 as Project 705 with construction at both the Admiralty yard, Leningrad and at Sevmashpredpriyatiye (SEVMASH — Northern Machine-building Enterprise), Severodvinsk. The lead boat – the K-64 – was built in Leningrad. Leningrad built three subsequent Project 705 submarines, and Severodvinsk built three Project 705K submarines (only differing in the reactor plant; see below). The first vessel was commissioned in 1971. Project 705 boats were intended to be experimental platforms themselves, to test all innovations and rectify their faults, that would afterwards found a new generation of submarines. This highly experimental nature mostly predetermined their future. In 1981, with the completion of the seventh vessel, production ended. All vessels were assigned to the Northern Fleet.

=== Propulsion ===
The power plant for the boat was a lead-bismuth cooled, beryllium-moderated reactor. Such liquid metal cooled reactors have a number of advantages over other types:

- Due to higher coolant temperature, their energy efficiency is up to 1.5 times higher.
- Lifetime without refueling can be increased more easily, in part due to higher efficiency.
- Liquid lead-bismuth systems can not cause an explosion and quickly solidify in case of a leak, greatly improving safety.
- Lead-bismuth cooled reactors are much lighter and smaller than water-cooled reactors, which was the primary factor when considering power plant choice for the Project 705 submarines.

Even though 1960s technology was barely sufficient to produce reliable LMRs, which are even today considered challenging, their advantages were considered compelling. Two power plants were developed independently, BM-40A by OKB Gidropress (Hydropress) in Leningrad and OK-550 by the OKBM design bureau in Nizhniy Novgorod, both using a eutectic lead-bismuth solution for the primary cooling stage, and both producing 155 MW of power.

Designed burst speed in tests was 43–45 kn (49–52 mph; 80–83 km/h) for all vessels, and speeds of 41–42 kn (47–48 mph; 76–78 km/h) could be sustained. Acceleration to top speed took one minute and turning 180 degrees at full speed took just 40 seconds. This degree of maneuverability exceeds all other submarines and most torpedoes that were in service at the time. Indeed, during training the boats proved able to successfully evade torpedoes launched by other submarines, which required introduction of faster torpedoes such as the American ADCAP or British Spearfish. However, the price for this was a very high noise level at burst speed. According to U.S. Naval Intelligence, the tactical speed was similar to Sturgeon-class submarines.

Propulsion was provided to the screw by a 40,000 shp steam turbine, and two 100 kW electric thrusters on the tips of the stern stabilizers were used for quieter "creeping" (low speed tactical maneuvering) and for emergency propulsion in the event of an engineering casualty. Electrical power was provided by two 1,500 kW turbogenerators, with a backup 500 kW diesel generator and a bank of 112 zinc-silver batteries.

The OK-550 plant was used on Project 705, but later, on 705K, the BM-40A plant was installed due to the low reliability of the OK-550. While more reliable, BM-40A still turned out to be much more demanding in maintenance than older pressurized water reactors. The issue was that the lead/bismuth eutectic solution solidifies at 125 °C (257 °F). If it ever hardened, it would be impossible to restart the reactor, since the fuel assemblies would be frozen in the solidified coolant. Thus, whenever the reactor is shut down, the liquid coolant must be heated externally with superheated steam. Near the piers where the submarines were moored, a special facility was constructed to deliver superheated steam to the vessels' reactors when the reactors were shut down. A smaller ship was also stationed at the pier to deliver steam from her steam plant to the Alfa submarines.

Coastal facilities were treated with much less attention than the submarines and often turned out unable to heat the submarines' reactors. Consequently, the plants had to be kept running even while the subs were in harbor. The facilities completely broke down early in the 1980s and since then the reactors of all operational Alfas were kept constantly running. While the BM-40A reactors are able to work for many years without stopping, they were not specifically designed for such treatment and any serious reactor maintenance became impossible. This led to a number of failures, including coolant leaks and one reactor broken down and frozen while at sea. However, constantly running the reactors proved better than relying on the coastal facilities. Four vessels were decommissioned due to freezing of the coolant.

Both the OK-550 and the BM-40A designs were single-use reactors and could not be refueled as the coolant would inevitably freeze in the process. This was compensated for by a much longer lifetime on their only load (up to 15 years), after which the reactors would be completely replaced. While such a solution could potentially decrease service times and increase reliability, it is still more expensive, and the idea of single-use reactors was unpopular in the 1970s. Furthermore, Project 705 does not have a modular design that would allow quick replacement of reactors, so such maintenance would take at least as long as refueling a normal submarine.

=== Hull ===
Like most Soviet nuclear submarines, Project 705 used a double hull, where the internal hull withstands the pressure and the outer one protects it and provides an optimal hydrodynamic shape. The gracefully curved outer hull and sail were highly streamlined for high submerged speed and maneuverability.

Apart from the prototypes, all six Project 705 and 705K submarines were built with titanium alloy hulls, which was revolutionary in submarine design at the time due to the cost of titanium and the technologies and equipment needed to work with it. The difficulties in the engineering became apparent in the first submarine that was quickly decommissioned after cracks developed in the hull. Later, metallurgy and welding technology were improved and no hull problems were experienced on subsequent vessels. American intelligence services confirmed their suspicions about the use of titanium alloys in the construction by retrieving metal shavings that fell from a truck as it left the St. Petersburg ship yard.

The pressure hull was separated into six watertight compartments, of which only the third (center) compartment was manned and others were accessible only for maintenance. The third compartment had reinforced spherical bulkheads that could withstand the pressure at the test depth and offered additional protection to the crew in case of attack. To further enhance survivability, the ship was equipped with an ejectable rescue capsule.

The original test depth requirement specified for Project 705 was 500 metres (1,600 ft), but after the preliminary design was completed, SKB-143 proposed relaxing this requirement to 400 metres (1,300 ft). Reducing test depth and thinning the pressure hull would make up for increases in weight of the reactor, sonar system, and transverse bulkheads. The common myth that the Alfas could dive to 1,000 metres (3,300 ft) or deeper is rooted in Western intelligence estimates made during the Cold War.

=== Control system ===
A suite of new systems was developed for these submarines, including:

- Akkord (Accord) combat information and control system, which received and processed hydroacoustic, television, radar, and navigation data from other systems, determining the location, speed, and predicted trajectory of other ships, submarines, and torpedoes. Information was displayed on control terminals, along with recommendations for operating a single submarine, both for attack and torpedo evasion, or commanding a group of submarines.
- Sargan weapon control system controlling attack, torpedo homing, and use of countermeasures, both by human command and automatically if required.
- Okean (Ocean) automated hydroacoustic (sonar) system that provided target data to other systems and eliminated the need for crew members working with detection equipment.
- Sozh navigation system and Boksit (Bauxite) course control system, which integrated course, depth, trim, and speed control, for manual, automated, and programmed maneuvering.
- Ritm (Rhythm) system controlling operation of all machinery aboard, eliminating the need for any personnel servicing reactor and other machinery, which was the main factor in reducing crew complement.
- Alfa radiation monitoring system.
- TV-1 television optical system for outside observation.

All the systems of the submarine were fully automated and all operations requiring human decision were performed from the control room. While such automation is common on aircraft, other military ships and submarines have multiple, separate teams performing these tasks. Crew intervention was required only for course changes or combat and no maintenance was performed at sea. Due to these systems, the combat shift of Alfa submarines consisted only of eight officers stationed in the control room. While nuclear submarines typically have 120 to 160 crew members, the initially proposed crew number was 14 — all officers, except the cook. Later it was considered more practical to have additional crew aboard that could be trained to operate the new generation of submarines and the number was increased to 27 officers and four warrant officers. Also, given that most of the electronics were newly developed and failures were expected, additional crew was stationed to monitor their performance. Some reliability problems were connected with electronics, and it is possible that some accidents could have been foreseen with more mature and better developed monitoring systems. Overall performance was considered good for an experimental system.

An added effect of the small crew complement was an advantage in reaction speed through elimination of long chains of command.

=== General characteristics ===
- Displacement: 2,300 tons surfaced, 3,200 tons submerged
- Length: 81.4 m
- Beam: 9.5 m
- Draft: 7.6 m
- Depth:
  - Usual operation: 350 m
  - Test depth: 400 m
  - Crush depth: possibly over 1300 m, depth figure contradicted by an authoritative Russian publication.
- Compartments: 6
- Complement: 27 officers, 4–18 NCOs; Russian source: 32
- Reactor: OK-550 reactor or BM-40A reactor, lead-bismuth cooled, beryllium-moderated reactor, 155 MW
- Steam turbines: OK-7K, 40,000 shp (30,000 kW)
- Propulsion: 1 propeller
- Speed (submerged): ~40 knots (46 mph; 74 km/h)
- Armament: 6 × 533 mm torpedo tubes:
  - 18–20 torpedoes SET-65A or SAET-60A (or)
  - 18–20 SS-N-15 cruise missiles (or)
  - 20–24 mines (or)
  - a mix of the above
- Systems:
  - Topol MRK.50 (Snoop Tray) surface search radar
  - Sozh navigation system radar
  - MG-21 Rosa underwater communications
  - Molniya satellite communications
  - Vint & Tissa radio communications antennas
  - Accord combat control system
  - Leningrad-705 fire control system
  - Ocean active/passive sonar
  - MG-24 luch mine detection sonar
  - Yenisei sonar intercept receiver
  - Bukhta ESM/ECM
  - Chrome-KM IFF

== Incidents ==
Two loss-of-coolant accidents occurred in Alfa class submarines. In 1971, suboptimal welding on the steam system allowed moisture to leak into an area where it picked up chlorides and then condensed and dripped onto primary coolant pipes containing the liquid metal coolant. This caused corrosion and breakage of the primary coolant pipes on Task Order 900. A move towards an integral pool-type reactor was considered the appropriate design evolution after this.

The second incident occurred on Project 705K (Task Order 105). Steam generator tubes in the evaporator section corroded and leaked steam into the primary system. Pressure increased in the primary system, which was designed to withstand the full pressure in this incident. However, a procedural step mandating that a valve to a sensitive manometer be closed during operation had not been followed. As a result, the high pressure could reach the sensitive instrument and broke through it, pouring polonium-contaminated aerosols into the inhabited part of the reactor compartment. While the reactor could have been repaired, it was decided to replace it entirely with a new one.

== Impact ==
Alfas, as with almost all other nuclear submarines, were never actually used in combat. However, the Soviet government still made good use of them, by exaggerating the planned number of vessels, which were assumed to allow naval superiority to be gained by shadowing major ship groups and destroying them in case of war. The US replied by starting the ADCAP program, and the British Royal Navy the Spearfish torpedo program, to create torpedoes with the range, speed, and intelligence to reliably pursue Alfa-class submarines.

The Alfas were intended to be only the first of a new generation of light, fast submarines, and before their decommissioning, there was already a family of derivative designs, including Project 705D, armed with long-range 650 mm torpedoes, and the Project 705A ballistic missile variant that was intended be able to defend herself successfully against attack submarines, therefore not needing patrolled bastions. However, the main thrust of Russian/Soviet SSN development was instead focused toward the larger, quieter boats that eventually became the Akula-class submarine.

The technologies and solutions developed, tested, and perfected on Alfas formed the foundation for future designs. The suite of submarine control systems was later used in the Akula-class, or Project 971 attack submarines that have a crew of 50, more than the Alfa but still less than half as many as other attack submarines. The Akula-class submarines represent a hybrid of the Alfa and Victor III classes, combining the stealth and towed sonar array of the Victor III with the automation of the Alfa class.

== Project Sapphire ==
Project Sapphire was a covert United States military operation to retrieve 1,278 pounds (580 kg) of very highly enriched uranium fuel intended for the Alfa-class submarines from a warehouse at the Ulba Metallurgical Plant outside Ust-Kamenogorsk in far eastern Kazakhstan, where it was stored with little protection after the fall of the Soviet Union. The material, known as uranium oxide-beryllium, was produced by the Ulba plant in the form of ceramic fuel rods for use by the submarines. "The Kazakh government had no idea that this material was there", Kazakh officials later told Harvard's Graham Allison, a national-security analyst. In February 1994 it was uncovered by Elwood Gift, an engineer from the Y-12 plant at Oak Ridge, Tennessee, stored in quart sized steel cans in a vault about twenty feet wide and thirty feet long. Some of it was on wire shelves while others were sitting on the floor. The cans were covered with dust. Word soon came that Iran had officially visited the site looking to purchase reactor fuel. Washington set up a tiger team, and on 8 October 1994 the Sapphire Team flew out of McGhee Tyson Air National Guard Base in three blacked out C-5 Galaxy cargo planes with 130 tons of equipment. It took the team six weeks, working twelve-hour shifts, six days a week, to process and can the 1,050 cans of uranium. The Sapphire Team finished recanning the uranium on 18 November 1994 at a cost of between ten and thirty million dollars (actual cost classified). The cans were loaded into 447 special fifty-five gallon drums for secure transport to the United States. Five C-5 Galaxys were dispatched from Dover Air Force Base, Delaware, to retrieve the team and the uranium, but four were forced to turn back because of bad weather. Only a single C-5, carrying 30,000 pounds of supplies Tennesseans had donated for Ust-Kamenogorsk area orphanages, got through. Eventually a second C-5 arrived, and the two planes carried the uranium to Dover, from where it was transported to Oak Ridge to be blended down for reactor fuel.

== Decommissioning ==
The first vessel was decommissioned in 1974. Five more in 1990 and the seventh in 1996. K-123 underwent a refit between 1983 and 1992 and had her reactor compartment replaced with a VM-4 pressurized water reactor. After being used for training, she was officially decommissioned on July 31, 1996. Decommissioning of the ships entailed the singular complication that, the reactor being cooled by liquid metals, the nuclear rods became fused with the coolant when the reactor was stopped and conventional methods for disassembling the reactor were unavailable. France's Commissariat à l'énergie atomique et aux énergies alternatives designed and donated special equipment for a dedicated dry-dock (SD-10) in Gremikha, which was used to remove and store the reactors until they could be dismantled.

== Units ==
#	Shipyard	Laid down	Launched	Commissioned	Status
K-64	Admiralty (Sudomekh), Leningrad	June 2, 1968	April 22, 1969	December 31, 1971	Decommissioned August 19, 1974, for scrapping
K-123	SEVMASH, Severodvinsk	December 22, 1967	April 4, 1976	December 12, 1977	Decommissioned July 31, 1996, for scrapping
K-316	Admiralty (Sudomekh), Leningrad	April 26, 1969	July 25, 1974	September 30, 1978	Decommissioned April 19, 1990, for scrapping
K-432	SEVMASH, Severodvinsk	November 12, 1967	November 3, 1977	December 31, 1978	Decommissioned April 19, 1990, for scrapping
K-373	Admiralty (Sudomekh), Leningrad	June 26, 1972	April 19, 1978	December 29, 1979	Decommissioned April 19, 1990, for scrapping
K-493	SEVMASH, Severodvinsk	January 21, 1972	September 21, 1980	September 30, 1981	Decommissioned April 19, 1990, for scrapping
K-463	Admiralty (Sudomekh), Leningrad	June 26, 1975	March 30, 1981	December 30, 1981	Decommissioned April 19, 1990, for scrapping

== See also ==
- List of Soviet and Russian submarine classes
- Future of the Russian Navy
