= BM-40A reactor =

Russian nuclear fission reactor for use in submarines

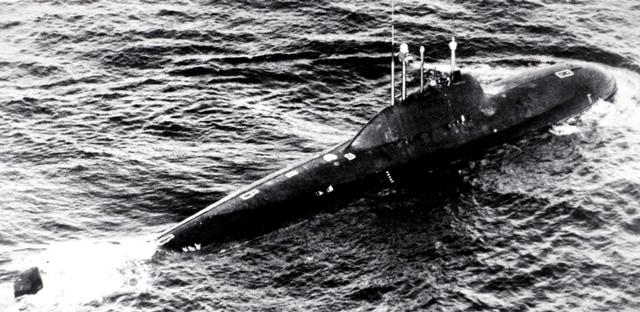
The BM-40A reactor is used on some Alfa class submarines

The BM-40A reactor is the nuclear fission reactor used to power four of the seven boats of the Soviet Navy's Project 705 Лира (Lira or Alfa in NATO designation) fourth generation submarines. It is a liquid metal cooled reactor (LMR), using highly enriched uranium-235 fuel to produce 155 MWt of power.

It was developed by OKB Gidropress in cooperation with IPPE.

BM-40A has two steam circulation loops.

== See also ==
- OK-550 reactor
