= Liquid metal cooled reactor =

Nuclear reactor where the coolant is liquid metal

A liquid metal cooled nuclear reactor (LMR) is a type of nuclear reactor where the primary coolant is a liquid metal. Liquid metal cooled reactors were first adapted for breeder reactor power generation. They have also been used to power nuclear submarines.

Due to their high thermal conductivity, metal coolants remove heat effectively, enabling high power density. This makes them attractive in situations where size and weight are at a premium, like on ships and submarines. Most water-based reactor designs are highly pressurized to raise the boiling point (thereby improving cooling capabilities), which presents safety and maintenance issues that liquid metal designs lack. Additionally, the high temperature of the liquid metal can be used to drive power conversion cycles with high thermodynamic efficiency. This makes them attractive for improving power output, cost effectiveness, and fuel efficiency in nuclear power plants.

Liquid metals, being electrically highly conductive, can be moved by electromagnetic pumps. Disadvantages include difficulties associated with inspection and repair of a reactor immersed in opaque molten metal, and depending on the choice of metal, fire hazard risk (for alkali metals), corrosion and/or production of radioactive activation products may be an issue.

== Applications ==
Liquid metal coolant has been applied to both thermal- and fast-neutron reactors.

To date, most fast neutron reactors have been liquid metal cooled and so are called liquid metal cooled fast reactors (LMFRs). When configured as a breeder reactor (e.g. with surrounding material to breed fissile material; i.e. a breeding blanket), such reactors are called liquid metal fast breeder reactors (LMFBRs).

== Coolant properties ==
Suitable liquid metal coolants must have a low neutron capture cross section, must not cause excessive corrosion of the structural materials, and must have melting and boiling points that are suitable for the reactor's operating temperature.

Liquid metals generally have high boiling points, reducing the probability that the coolant can boil, which could lead to a loss-of-coolant accident. Low vapor pressure enables operation at near-ambient pressure, further dramatically reducing the probability of an accident. Some designs immerse the entire core and heat exchangers into a pool of coolant, virtually eliminating the risk that inner-loop cooling will be lost.

Liquid metal coolants
Metal Coolant	Melting point	Boiling point
Mercury	−38.83 °C, (−37.894 °F)	356.73 °C (674.114 °F)
Sodium	97.72 °C, (207.896 °F)	883 °C, (1621.4 °F)
NaK	−11 °C, (12.2 °F)	785 °C, (1445 °F)
Lead	327.46 °C, (621.428 °F)	1749 °C, (3180.2 °F)
Lead-bismuth eutectic	123.5 °C, (254.3 °F)	1670 °C, (3038 °F)
Tin	231.9 °C, (449.42 °F)	2602 °C, (4715.6 °F)

=== Mercury ===
Clementine was the first liquid metal cooled nuclear reactor and used mercury coolant, thought to be the obvious choice since it is liquid at room temperature. However, because of disadvantages including high toxicity, high vapor pressure even at room temperature, low boiling point producing noxious fumes when heated, relatively low thermal conductivity, and a high neutron cross-section, it has fallen out of favor.

=== Sodium and NaK ===
Sodium and NaK (a eutectic sodium-potassium alloy) do not corrode steel to any significant degree and are compatible with many nuclear fuels, allowing for a wide choice of structural materials. NaK was used as the coolant in the first breeder reactor prototype, the Experimental Breeder Reactor-1, in 1951.

Sodium is a poor neutron moderator, and allows a reactor to operate with a fast neutron spectrum as in a sodium-cooled fast reactor. It can also be used as a coolant in a thermal reactor when paired with a separate moderator such as graphite, as in a Sodium Graphite Reactor (SGR). As graphite-moderated reactors, SGRs allow the use of natural uranium fuel instead of enriched uranium, and their sodium coolant allows for high-temperature operation and thus high thermal efficiency. Since the liquid sodium remains at low pressure, SGRs avoid the expensive reactor pressure vessel and piping systems of light-water reactors. They also feature a strong, prompt negative fuel temperature coefficient of reactivity, making such reactors comparatively easy to control. SGRs were experimented with in the 1950s beginning with the Sodium Reactor Experiment, but soon fell out of favor due to issues with their sodium coolant and competition from competing light-water reactor designs.

Sodium and NaK do, however, ignite spontaneously on contact with air and react violently with water, producing hydrogen gas. This was the case at the Monju Nuclear Power Plant in a 1995 accident and fire. Sodium was the coolant used in Experimental Breeder Reactor II. It was demonstrated in 1986, to an invited international audience, to be "walk-away" safe. Sodium is also the coolant used in the Russian BN reactor series and the Chinese CFR series in commercial operation today. Neutron activation of sodium also causes these liquids to become intensely radioactive during operation, though the half-life is short and therefore their radioactivity does not pose an additional disposal concern.

There are two proposals for a sodium cooled Gen IV LMFR, one based on oxide fuel, the other on the metal-fueled integral fast reactor.

A sodium cooled GE Vernova Hitachi PRISM reactor will be part of the Natrium system being built by TerraPower at Kemmerer, Wyoming.

=== Lead ===
Lead has excellent neutron properties (reflection, low absorption) and is a very potent radiation shield against gamma rays. The high boiling point of lead provides safety advantages as it can cool the reactor efficiently even if it reaches several hundred degrees Celsius above normal operating conditions. However, because lead has a high melting point and a high vapor pressure, it is tricky to refuel and service a lead cooled reactor. The melting point can be lowered by alloying the lead with bismuth, but lead-bismuth eutectic is highly corrosive to most metals used for structural materials. The high density and viscosity of lead results in large pumping expense, which reduces the overall efficiency of the system. Neutron absorption in lead and bismuth produce radioactive isotopes with relatively long half lives. The most dangerous of these is polonium-210, which was used to poison Alexander Litvinenko on November 1, 2006,

=== Lead-bismuth eutectic ===
Lead-bismuth eutectic allows operation at lower temperatures while preventing the freezing of the metal coolant in a lower temperature range (eutectic point: 123.5 °C / 255.3 °F).

Beside its highly corrosive character, its main disadvantage is the formation by neutron activation of ^{209}Bi (and subsequent beta decay) of ^{210}Po (T_{1/2} = 138.38 day), a volatile alpha-emitter highly radiotoxic (the highest known radiotoxicity, above that of plutonium).

=== Tin ===
Although tin today is not used as a coolant for working reactors because it builds a crust, it can be a useful additional or replacement coolant at nuclear disasters or loss-of-coolant accidents.

== Propulsion ==
=== Submarines ===
The Soviet November-class submarine K-27 and all seven Alfa-class submarines used reactors cooled by lead-bismuth eutectic and moderated with beryllium as their propulsion plants. (VT-1 reactors in K-27; BM-40A and OK-550 reactors in others).

The second nuclear submarine, USS Seawolf was the only U.S. submarine to have a sodium-cooled, beryllium-moderated nuclear power plant. It was commissioned in 1957, but it had leaks in its superheaters, which were bypassed. In order to standardize the reactors in the fleet, the submarine's sodium-cooled, beryllium-moderated reactor was removed starting in 1958 and replaced with a pressurized water reactor.

=== Nuclear aircraft ===
Liquid metal cooled reactors were studied by Pratt & Whitney for use in nuclear aircraft as part of the Aircraft Nuclear Propulsion program.

== Power generation ==
The Sodium Reactor Experiment was an experimental sodium-cooled graphite-moderated nuclear reactor (A Sodium-Graphite Reactor, or SGR) sited in a section of the Santa Susana Field Laboratory then operated by the Atomics International division of North American Aviation.

In July 1959, the Sodium Reactor Experiment suffered a serious incident involving the partial melting of 13 of 43 fuel elements and a significant release of radioactive gases. The reactor was repaired and returned to service in September 1960 and ended operation in 1964. The reactor produced a total of 37 GW-h of electricity.

SRE was the prototype for the Hallam Nuclear Power Facility, another sodium-cooled graphite-moderated SGR that operated in Nebraska.

Fermi 1 in Monroe County, Michigan was an experimental, liquid sodium-cooled fast breeder reactor that operated from 1963 to 1972. As a result of an ill-advised design change insisted by the United States Atomic Energy Commission (AEC), to which Argonne National Laboratory objected, it suffered a partial nuclear meltdown in 1963 and was decommissioned in 1975.

The 20 MWe Experimental Breeder Reactor II entered service in 1964, and operated flawlessly until it and the research program being conducted there was terminated by the Clinton Administration in 1994. Nobel Physics Laureate Hans Bethe had described it as "the best research reactor ever built." It powered the entire Idaho National Laboratory facility near Idaho Falls and sold excess power to the local grid.

At Dounreay in Caithness, in the far north of Scotland, the United Kingdom Atomic Energy Authority (UKAEA) operated the Dounreay Fast Reactor (DFR), using NaK as a coolant, from 1959 to 1977, exporting 600 GW-h of electricity to the grid over that period. It was succeeded at the same site by PFR, the Prototype Fast Reactor, which operated from 1974 to 1994 and used liquid sodium as its coolant.

The Soviet BN-600 is sodium cooled. The BN-350 and EBR-I used a liquid metal alloy, NaK, for cooling. NaK is liquid at room temperature. Liquid metal cooling is also used in most fast neutron reactors, including fast breeder reactors such as the Integral Fast Reactor.

Many Generation IV reactors currently under development are liquid metal cooled, such as the sodium-cooled fast reactor (SFR) and the lead-cooled fast reactor.
