= OK-550 reactor =

Nuclear fission reactor

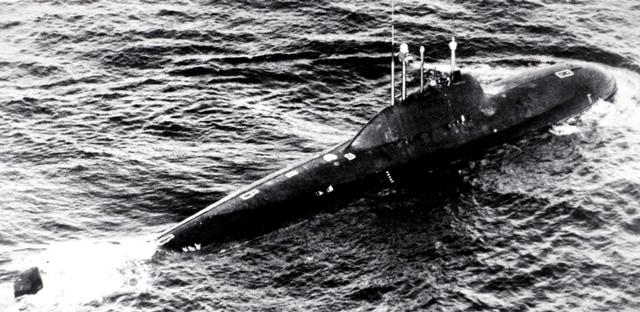
Alfa class submarine

The OK-550 reactor is the nuclear fission reactor used to power three of the seven boats of the Soviet Navy's Project 705 Лира (Lira or Alfa in NATO designation) fourth generation submarines. It is a liquid metal cooled reactor (LMR), using highly enriched uranium-235 fuel to produce 155 MWt of power.

OK-550 has three separate steam circulation loops, and was used in the boats built at Severodvinsk.

The reactor was developed by OKBM.

== See also ==
- BM-40A reactor
