= Liquid metal embrittlement =

Loss of ductility when exposed to liquid metals

Liquid metal embrittlement (also known as LME and liquid metal induced embrittlement) is a phenomenon of practical importance, where certain ductile metals experience drastic loss in tensile ductility or undergo brittle fracture when exposed to specific liquid metals. Generally, tensile stress, either externally applied or internally present, is needed to induce embrittlement. Exceptions to this rule have been observed, as in the case of aluminium in the presence of liquid gallium. This phenomenon has been studied since the beginning of the 20th century. Many of its phenomenological characteristics are known and several mechanisms have been proposed to explain it. The practical significance of liquid metal embrittlement is revealed by the observation that several steels experience ductility losses and cracking during hot-dip galvanizing or during subsequent fabrication. Cracking can occur catastrophically and very high crack growth rates have been measured.

Similar metal embrittlement effects can be observed even in the solid state, when one of the metals is brought close to its melting point; e.g. cadmium-coated parts operating at high temperature. This phenomenon is known as solid metal embrittlement.

== Characteristics ==
=== Mechanical behavior ===
Liquid metal embrittlement is characterized by the reduction in the threshold stress intensity, true fracture stress or in the strain to fracture when tested in the presence of liquid metals as compared to that obtained in air / vacuum tests. The reduction in fracture strain is generally temperature dependent and a “ductility trough” is observed as the test temperature is decreased. A ductile-to-brittle transition behaviour is also exhibited by many metal couples. The shape of the elastic region of the stress-strain curve is not altered, but the plastic region may be changed during LME. Very high crack propagation rates, varying from a few centimetres per second to several meters per second are induced in solid metals by the embrittling liquid metals. An incubation period and a slow pre-critical crack propagation stage generally precede the final fracture.

=== Metal chemistry ===
It is believed that there is specificity in the solid-liquid metal combinations experiencing LME. There should be limited mutual solubilities for the metal couple to cause embrittlement. Excess solubility makes sharp crack propagation difficult, but no solubility condition prevents wetting of the solid surfaces by liquid metal and prevents LME. The presence of an oxide layer on the solid metal surface also prevents good contact between the two metals and stops LME. The chemical compositions of the solid and liquid metals affect the severity of embrittlement. The addition of third elements to the liquid metal may increase or decrease the embrittlement and alter the temperature region over which embrittlement is seen. Metal combinations which form intermetallic compounds do not cause LME. There are a wide variety of LME couples. Most technologically important are the LME of aluminum and steel alloys.

=== Metallurgy ===
Alloying of the solid metal alters its LME. Some alloying elements may increase the severity while others may prevent LME. The action of the alloying element is known to be segregation to grain boundaries of the solid metal and alteration of the grain boundary properties. Accordingly, maximum LME is seen in cases where alloy addition elements have saturated the grain boundaries of the solid metal. The hardness and deformation behaviour of the solid metal affects its susceptibility to LME. Generally, harder metals are more severely embrittled. Grain size greatly influences LME. Solids with larger grains are more severely embrittled and the fracture stress varies inversely with the square root of grain diameter. Also the brittle to ductile transition temperature is increased by increasing grain size.

=== Physico-chemical properties ===
The interfacial energy between the solid and liquid metals and the grain boundary energy of the solid metal greatly influence LME. These energies depend upon the chemical compositions of the metal couple.

=== Test parameters ===
External parameters like temperature, strain rate, stress and time of exposure to the liquid metal prior to testing affect LME. Temperature produces a ductility trough and a ductile to brittle transition behaviour in the solid metal. The temperature range of the trough as well as the transition temperature are altered by the composition of the liquid and solid metals, the structure of the solid metal and other experimental parameters. The lower limit of the ductility trough generally coincides with the melting point of the liquid metal. The upper limit is strain rate sensitive. Temperature also affects the kinetics of LME. An increase in strain rate increases the upper limit temperature as well as the crack propagation rate. In most metal couples LME does not occur below a threshold stress level.

Testing typically involves tensile specimens but more sophisticated testing using fracture mechanics specimens is also performed.

== Mechanisms ==
The major theories proposed for LME are:

- The dissolution-diffusion model of Robertson and Glikman says that absorption of the liquid metal on the solid metal induces dissolution and inward diffusion. Under stress, these processes lead to crack nucleation and propagation.
- The brittle fracture theory of Stoloff and Johnson, Westwood and Kamdar proposed that the adsorption of the liquid metal atoms at the crack tip weakens inter-atomic bonds and propagates the crack.
- Gordon postulated a model based on diffusion-penetration of liquid metal atoms to nucleate cracks which, under stress, grow to cause failure.
- The ductile failure model of Lynch and Popovich predicted that adsorption of the liquid metal leads to the weakening of atomic bonds and nucleation of dislocations, which move under stress, pile up and work harden the solid. Also, dissolution helps in the nucleation of voids which grow under stress and cause ductile failure.

All of these models, with the exception of Robertson, utilize the concept of an adsorption-induced surface energy lowering of the solid metal as the central cause of LME. They have succeeded in predicting many of the phenomenological observations. However, quantitative prediction of LME is still elusive.

== Mercury embrittlement ==
The most common liquid metal to cause embrittlement is mercury, as it is a common contaminant in the processing of hydrocarbons in petroleum reservoirs. Mercury spills present an especially significant danger for aeroplanes. The aluminium-zinc-magnesium-copper alloy DTD 5050B is especially susceptible. The Al-Cu alloy DTD 5020A is less susceptible. Spilled elemental mercury can be immobilized and made relatively harmless by silver nitrate.

On 1 January 2004, the Moomba, South Australia, natural gas processing plant operated by Santos suffered a major fire. The gas release that led to the fire was caused by the failure of a heat exchanger (cold box) inlet nozzle in the liquids recovery plant. The failure of the inlet nozzle was due to liquid metal embrittlement of the train B aluminium cold box by elemental mercury.

== See also ==
- Embrittlement
- Hydrogen embrittlement
