= Uranium nitrides =

Uranium nitride

Names
- IUPAC name Uranium nitride

Identifiers
CAS Number	UN: 25658-43-9; UN_{2}: 12033-83-9
3D model (JSmol)	UN: Interactive image; UN_{2}: Interactive image; U_{2}N_{3}: Interactive image
ChemSpider	UN: 105089
PubChem CID	UN: 117595
- InChI: InChI=1S/N.U Key: MVXWAZXVYXTENN-UHFFFAOYSA-N
- SMILES: UN: U#N; UN_{2}: N#[U]#N; U_{2}N_{3}: N#[U]=N([U]#N)

Properties
Chemical formula	U_{2}N_{3}
Molar mass	518.078 g/mol
Appearance	crystalline solid
Density	11300 kg·m^{−3}, solid
Melting point	900 to 1,100 °C (1,650 to 2,010 °F; 1,170 to 1,370 K) (decomposes to UN)
Boiling point	Decomposes
Solubility in water	0.08 g/100 ml (20 °C)

Structure
Crystal structure	Hexagonal, hP5
Space group	P-3m1, No. 164
- Except where otherwise noted, data are given for materials in their standard state (at 25 °C [77 °F], 100 kPa). verify (what is ?) Infobox references

Uranium nitrides refers to any of a family of several ceramic materials: uranium mononitride (UN), uranium sesquinitride (U_{2}N_{3}) and uranium dinitride (UN_{2}). The word nitride refers to the −3 oxidation state of the nitrogen bound to the uranium.

Uranium nitride has been considered as a potential nuclear fuel and will be used as such in the BREST-300 nuclear reactor currently under construction in Russia. It is said to be safer, stronger, denser, more thermally conductive and having a higher temperature tolerance. Challenges to implementation of the fuel include a complex conversion route from enriched UF_{6}, the need to prevent oxidation during manufacturing and the need to define and license a final disposal route. The necessity to use expensive, highly isotopically enriched ^{15}N is a significant factor to overcome. This is necessary due to the (relatively) high neutron capture cross-section of the far-more-common ^{14}N, which affects the neutron economy of a reactor.

== Synthesis ==
=== Carbothermic reduction ===
The common technique for generating UN is carbothermic reduction of uranium oxide (UO_{2}) in a 2 step method illustrated below.

3UO_{2} + 6C → 2UC + UO_{2} + 4CO (in argon, > 1450 °C for 10 to 20 hours)
4UC + 2UO_{2} +3N_{2} → 6UN + 4CO

=== Sol-gel ===
Sol-gel methods and arc melting of pure uranium under nitrogen atmosphere can also be used to generate uranium nitrides.

=== Ammonolysis ===
Another common technique for generating UN_{2} is the ammonolysis of uranium tetrafluoride. Uranium tetrafluoride is exposed to ammonia gas under high pressure and temperature, which replaces the fluorine with nitrogen and generates hydrogen fluoride. Hydrogen fluoride is a colourless gas at this temperature and mixes with the ammonia gas.

Another way of generating UN involves reacting UH_{3} with NH_{3} at 250 °C.

=== Hydriding-nitriding ===
An additional method of UN synthesis employs fabrication directly from metallic uranium. By exposing metallic uranium to hydrogen gas at temperatures in excess of 280 °C, UH_{3} can be formed. Furthermore, since UH_{3} has a higher specific volume than the metallic phase, hydridation can be used to physically decompose otherwise solid uranium. Following hydridation, UH_{3} can be exposed to a nitrogen atmosphere at temperatures around 500 °C, thereby forming U_{2}N_{3}. By additional heating to temperatures above 1150 °C, the sesquinitride can then be decomposed to UN.

2U + 3H_{2} → 2UH_{3}
2UH_{3} + 1.5N_{2} → U_{2}N_{3}
U_{2}N_{3} → UN + 0.5N_{2}

Use of the isotope ^{15}N (which constitutes around 0.37% of natural nitrogen) is preferable because the predominant isotope, ^{14}N, has a significant neutron absorption cross section which affects neutron economy and, in particular, it undergoes an (n,p) reaction which produces significant amounts of radioactive ^{14}C which would need to be carefully contained and sequestered during reprocessing or permanent storage.

== Decomposition ==
Each uranium dinitride complex is considered to have three distinct compounds present simultaneously because of decomposing of uranium dinitride (UN_{2}) into uranium sesquinitride (U_{2}N_{3}), and then uranium mononitride (UN). Uranium dinitrides decompose to uranium mononitride by the following sequence of reactions:

4UN_{2} → 2U_{2}N_{3}+ N_{2}
2U_{2}N_{3} → 4UN +N_{2}

Decomposition of UN_{2} is the most common method for isolating uranium sesquinitride (U_{2}N_{3}).

== Uses ==
Uranium mononitride is being considered as a potential fuel for generation IV reactors such as the Hyperion Power Module reactor created by Hyperion Power Generation. It has also been proposed as nuclear fuel in some fast neutron nuclear test reactors. UN is considered superior because of its higher fissionable density, thermal conductivity, and melting temperature than the most common nuclear fuel, uranium oxide (UO_{2}), while also demonstrating lower release of fission product gases and swelling, and decreased chemical reactivity with cladding materials. It also has a superior mechanical, thermal, and radiation stability compared to standard metallic uranium fuel. The thermal conductivity is on the order of 4–8 times higher than that of uranium dioxide, the most commonly used nuclear fuel, at typical operating temperatures. Increased thermal conductivity results in a smaller thermal gradient between inner and outer sections of the fuel, potentially allowing for higher operating temperatures and reducing macroscopic restructuring of the fuel, which limits fuel lifetime.

== Molecular and crystal structure ==
The uranium dinitride (UN_{2}) compound has a face-centered cubic crystal structure of the calcium fluoride (CaF_{2}) type with a space group of Fm3̅m. Nitrogen forms triple bonds on each side of uranium forming a linear structure.

α-(U_{2}N_{3}) has a body-centered cubic crystal structure of the (Mn_{2}O_{3}) type with a space group of Ia3̅ .

UN has a face-centered cubic crystal structure of the NaCl type. The metal component of the bond uses the 5f orbital of the uranium but forms a relatively weak interaction but is important for the crystal structure. The covalent portion of the bonds forms from the overlap between the 6d orbital and 7s orbital on the uranium and the 2p orbitals on the nitrogen. N forms a triple bond with uranium creating a linear structure.

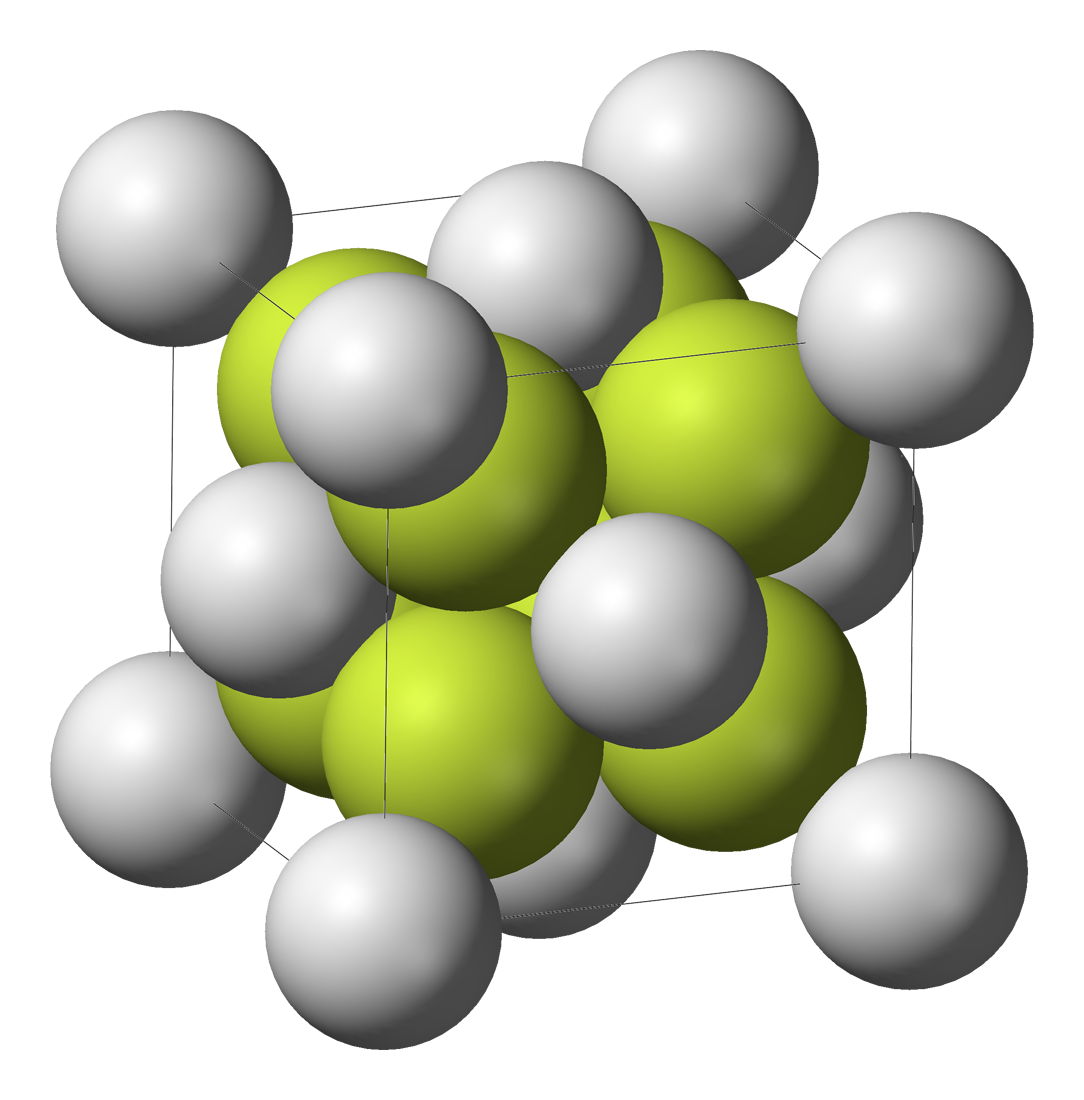
Uranium dinitride

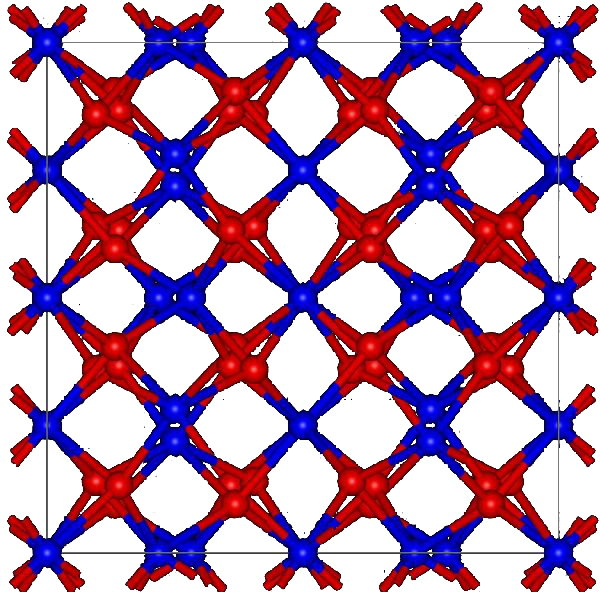
Uranium sesquinitride

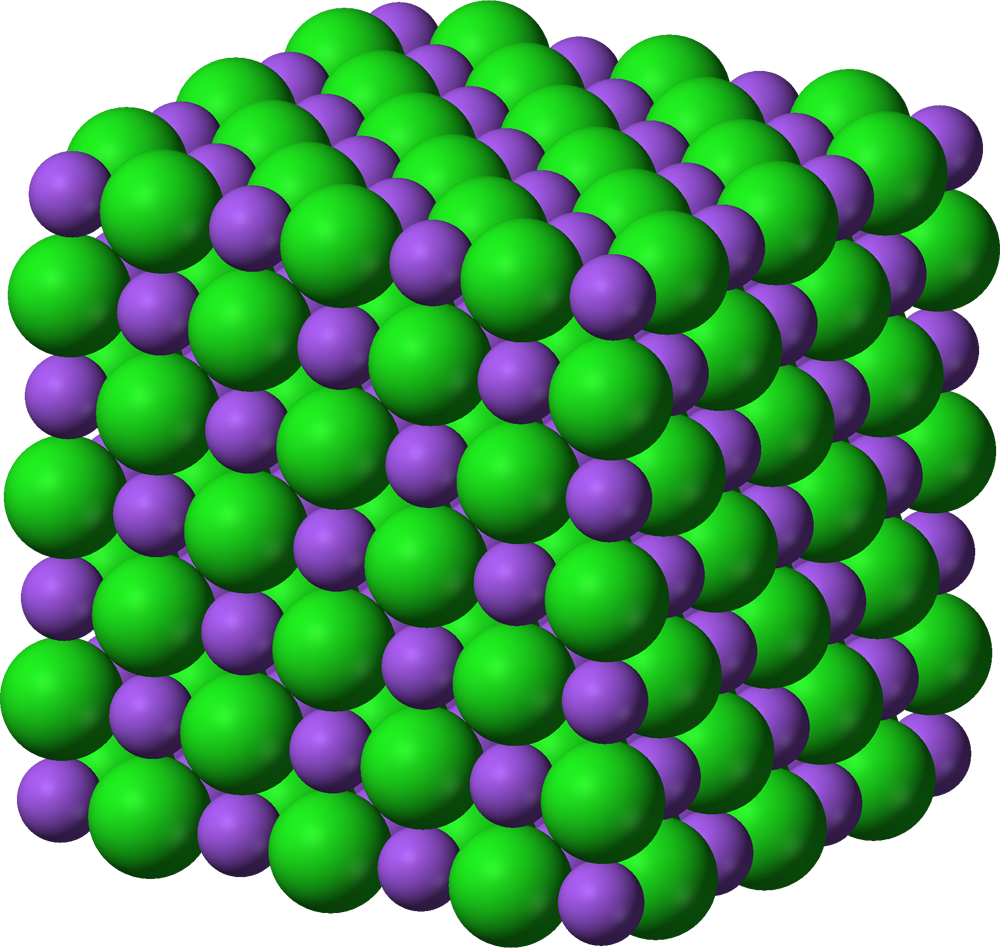
Uranium mononitride

== Uranium nitrido derivatives ==
Recently, there have been many developments in the synthesis of complexes with terminal uranium nitride (–U≡N) bonds. In addition to radioactive concerns common to all uranium chemistry, production of uranium nitrido complexes has been slowed by harsh reaction conditions and solubility challenges. Nonetheless, syntheses of such complexes have been reported in the past few years, for example the three shown below among others. Other U≡N compounds have also been synthesized or observed with various structural features, such as bridging nitride ligands in di-/polynuclear species, and various oxidation states.

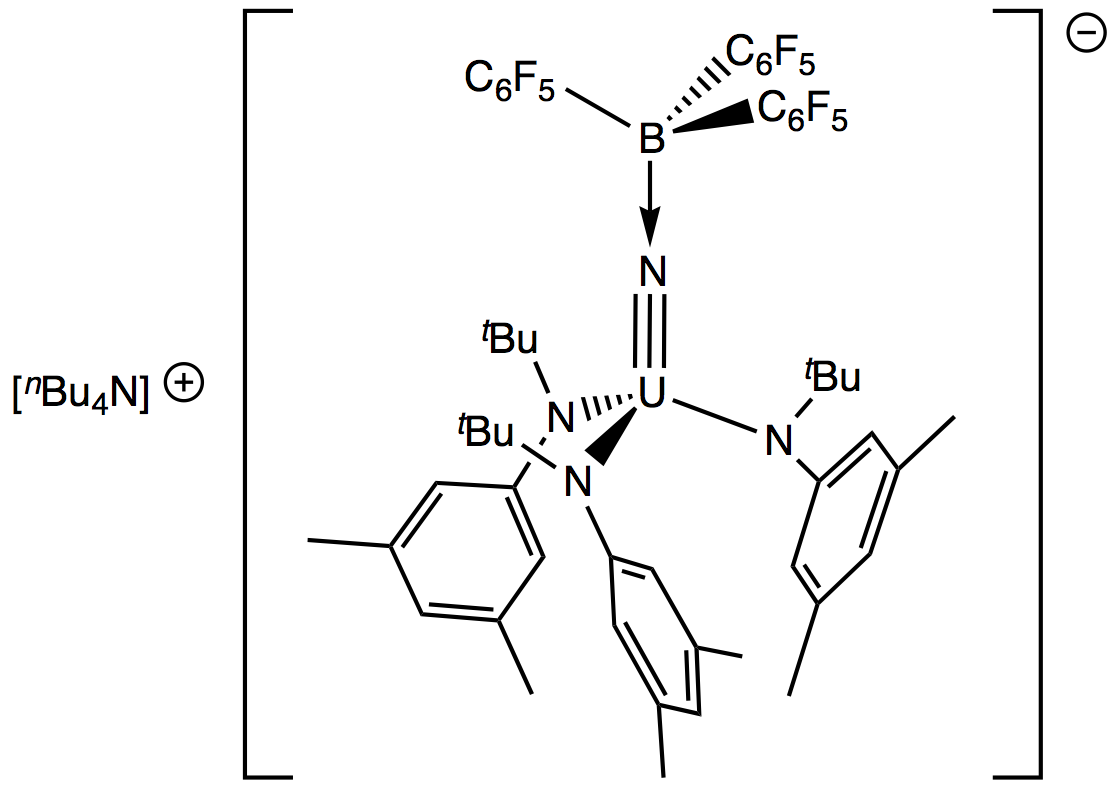
[N(n-Bu)_{4}] [(C_{6}F_{5})_{3}B−N≡U(Nt-BuAr)_{3}]

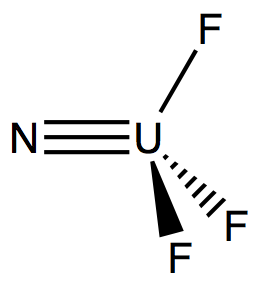
N≡UF_{3}

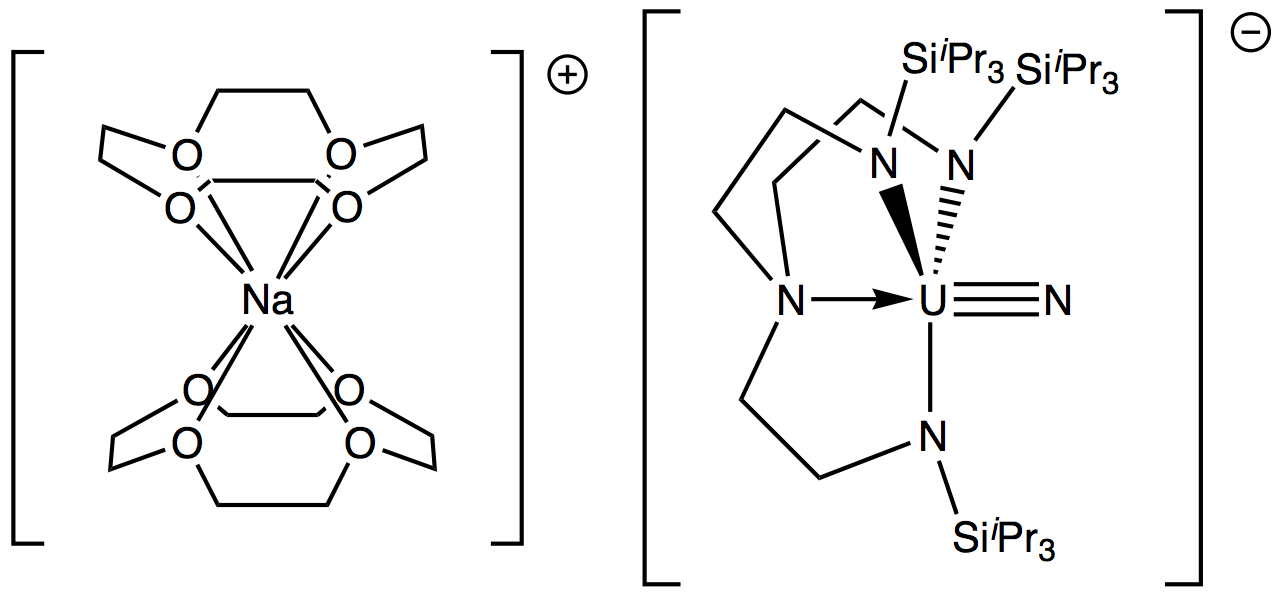
[Na(12-crown-4)_{2}] [N≡U−N(CH_{2}CH_{2}Ntips)_{3}]

== See also ==
- List of energy densities
- Nuclear fuel cycle
- Nuclear reactor
- Uranium carbide
- Uranium oxide
