= Oleksandrivka, Oleksandrivka settlement hromada, Voznesensk Raion, Mykolaiv Oblast =

Rural locality in Mykolaiv Oblast, Ukraine

Oleksandrivka Олександрівка
- Rural settlement
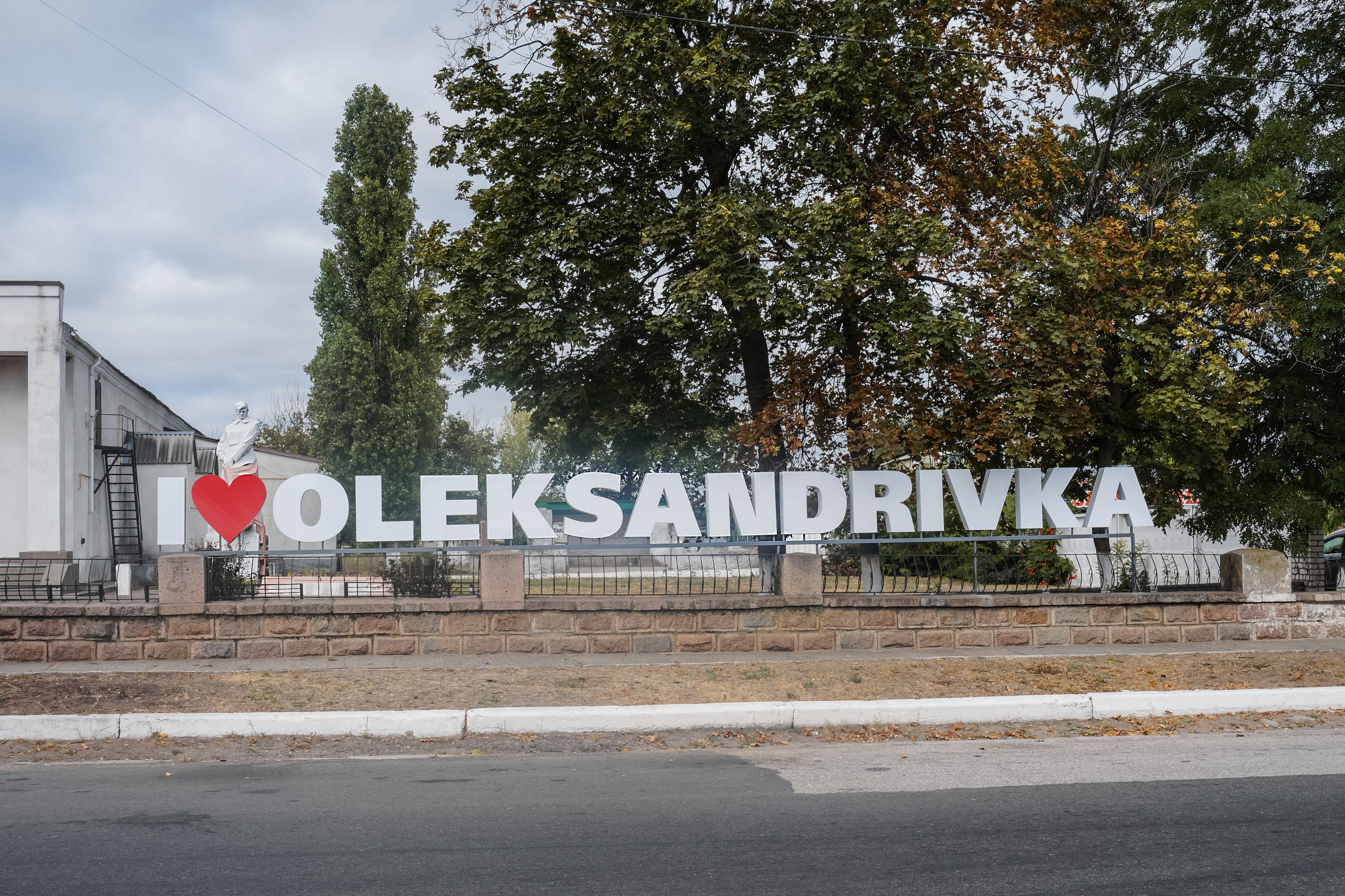
- Interactive map of Oleksandrivka
- Location within Ukraine Location within Mykolaiv Oblast
- Coordinates: 47°41′31″N 31°16′8″E
- Country: Ukraine
- Oblast: Mykolaiv Oblast
- Raion: Voznesensk Raion

Population (2022)
  - Total: 5,040
- Time zone: UTC+2 (EET)
  - Summer (DST): UTC+3 (EEST)

Oleksandrivka (Ukrainian: Олександрівка) is a rural settlement in Voznesensk Raion, Mykolaiv Oblast, in southern Ukraine. It hosts the administration of Oleksandrivka settlement hromada, one of the hromadas of Ukraine. Population: 5,040 (2022 estimate).

The settlement is located on the left bank of the Southern Bug, between Pivdennoukrainsk and Voznesensk (the raion center) approximately 5 kilometres (3.1 mi) north of it.

== History ==
During the Ukrainian War of Independence, from 1917 to 1920, it passed between various factions. Afterwards, it was administratively part of the Odesa Governorate of Ukraine. In 1923, uyezds in Ukrainian Soviet Socialist Republic were abolished, and the governorates were divided into okruhas. In 1923, Voznesensk Raion with the administrative center located in Voznesensk was established. It belonged to Mykolaiv Okruha of Odesa Governorate. Oleksandrivka was included in Voznesensk Raion. In 1925, the governorates were abolished, and okruhas were directly subordinated to Ukrainian SSR. In 1930, okruhas were abolished, and on 27 February 1932, Odesa Oblast was established, and Voznesensk Raion was included into Odesa Oblast. In 1968, Oleksandrivka was granted urban-type settlement status.

During the Russian Invasion of Ukraine, Oleksandrivka marked the northernmost point Russian forces reached in the Battle of Mykolaiv. On 26 January 2024, a new law entered into force which abolished the status of urban-type settlement status, and Oleksandrivka became a rural settlement.

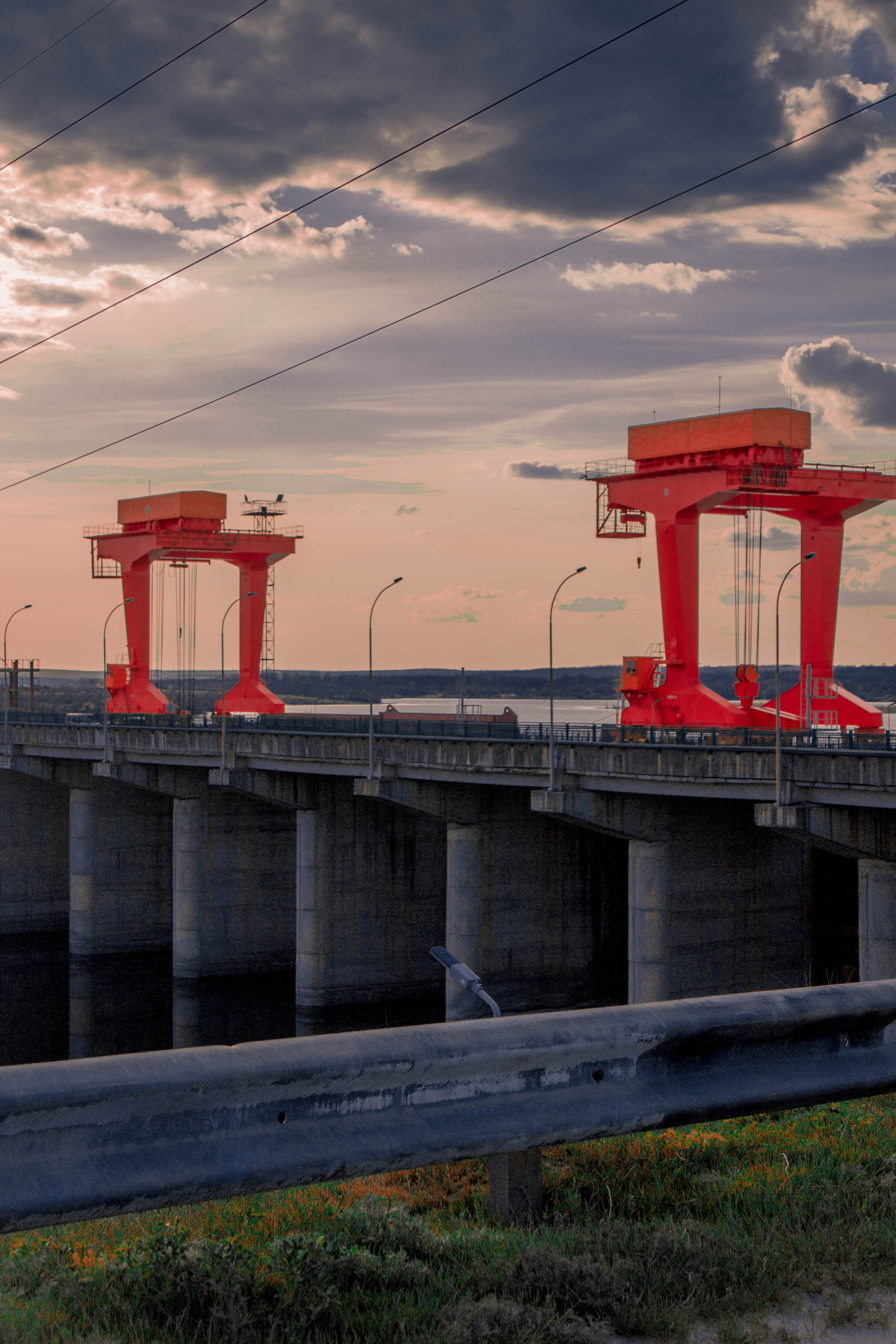
The modern dam

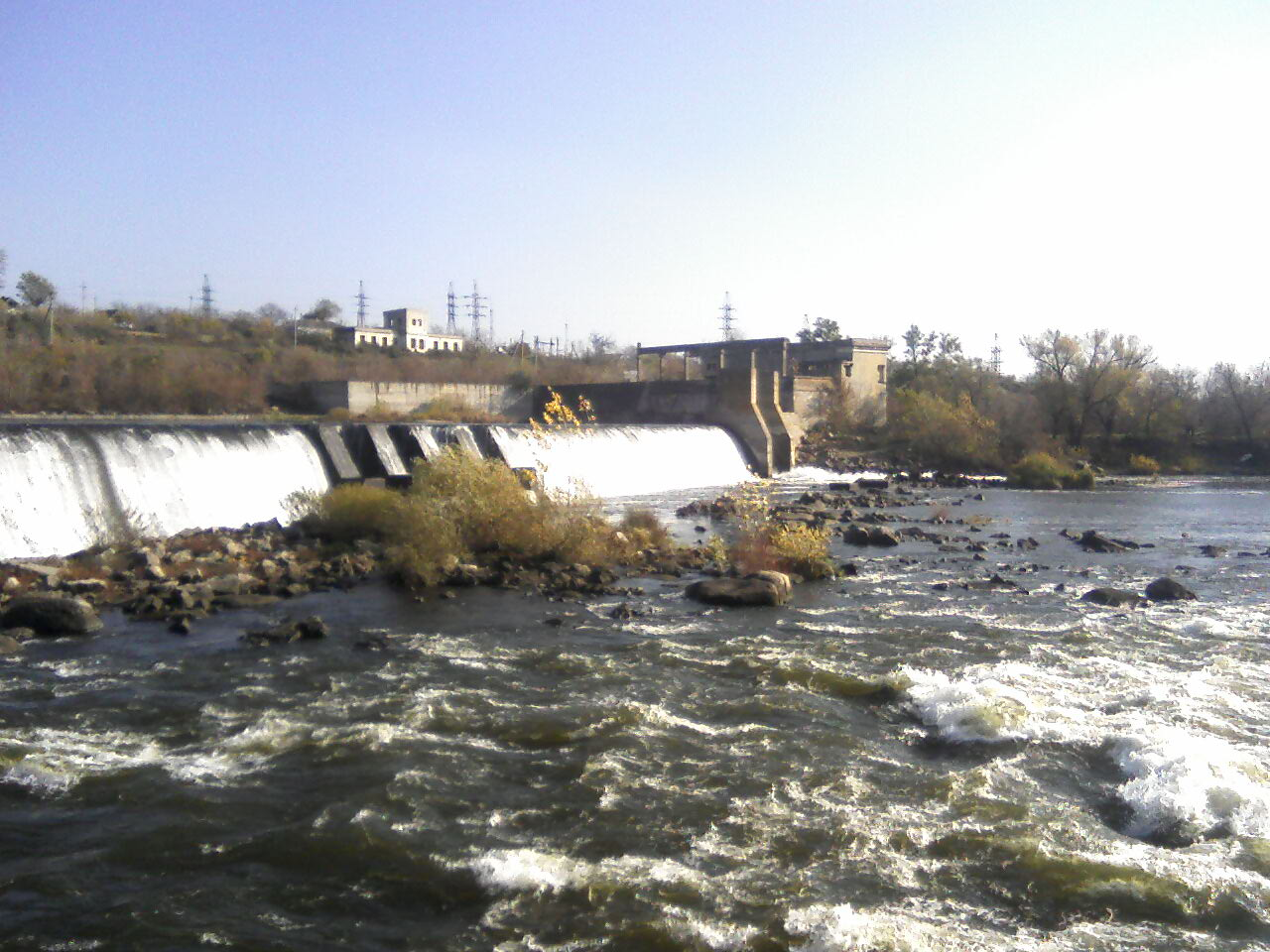
The old dam

== Economy ==
The town has a dam and hydroelectric power station, Oleksandrivka HES, operated by Energoatom. The station is part of the South Ukraine Energy Complex, which includes the Tashlyk Pumped-Storage Power Plant and the South Ukraine Nuclear Power Plant in Pivdennoukrainsk. The water reservoir created by the dam is part of the National nature park "Buh Gard" (formerly known as Granite-steppe lands of Buh).

=== Transportation ===
Oleksandrivka railway station is several kilometers south of the settlement, but the closest railway station is in Trykratne, 3 kilometres (1.9 mi) from Oleksandrivka. Both stations are on the railway line connecting Tokarivka and Pomichna.
