= 4th Nuclear Power Plant Protection Battalion =

4th Nuclear Power Plant Defense Battalion
- 4-й окремий батальйон охорони ОВДО НГ (Ukrainian)
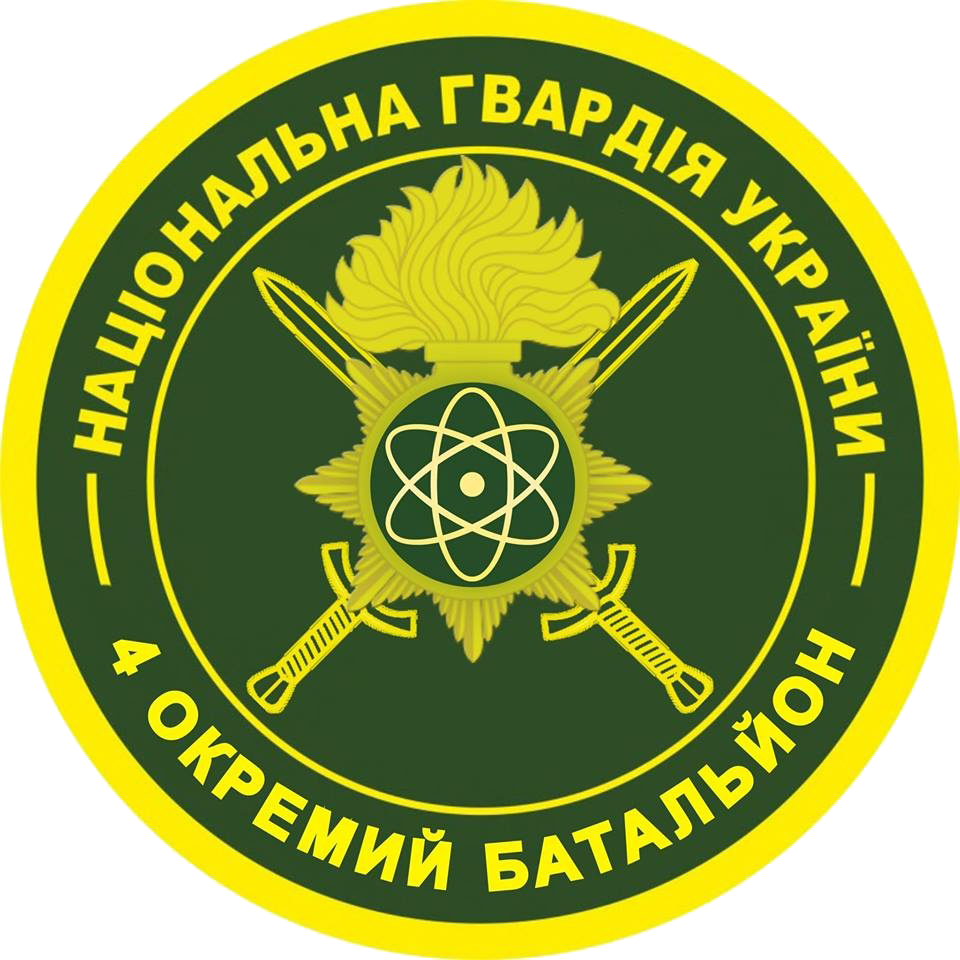
- Regimental Insignia
- Founded: 1991
- Country: Ukraine
- Allegiance: Ministry of Internal Affairs
- Branch: National Guard of Ukraine
- Type: Battalion
- Role: CBRN defense of South Ukraine Nuclear Power Plant
- Part of: National Guard of Ukraine
- Garrison/HQ: Pivdennoukrainsk
- Engagements: Russo-Ukrainian war: Russian invasion of Ukraine

Commanders
- Current commander: Colonel Oleg Khudoliy

The 4th Nuclear Power Plant Defense Battalion is a battalion of the National Guard of Ukraine tasked with CBRN defense specifically of the South Ukraine Nuclear Power Plant and has seen action against Russian forces during the Russian invasion of Ukraine. In its current form, it was established in 1992 and headquartered at Pivdennoukrainsk.

== History ==
The Battalion was established on 1 July 1991 for the protection and safety of the South Ukraine Nuclear Power Plant.

In 2014, the Battalion was one of the first units to enter the ATO zone following the start of the War in Donbass.

Russian rocket strike on 19 September 2022

In 2022, following the full scale Russian invasion of Ukraine, the battalion saw combat against Russian forces. During the 2022 Russian invasion of Ukraine, the Russian troops were advancing towards the South Ukraine Nuclear Power Plant, under the battalion's protection, but were repelled in the March 2022 Battle of Voznesensk. On 19 September 2022, the South Ukraine Nuclear Power Plant was reportedly hit by Russian artillery. A missile exploded about 300 metres from the reactors, blowing out windows in the buildings and damaging a neighbouring hydroelectric power station. Nuclear reactors were not damaged. The strike was reportedly conducted by an 9K720 Iskander. In November 2023, it was deployed to the Zaporizhzhia Oblast engaging Russian forces as a part of the Southern Ukraine campaign. During the combat in Mala Tokmachka, a soldier (David Igorovich Stoyanov) was killed on 16 November 2023 as a result of artillery strikes on the battalion's positions and the commander of the reaction platoon of the battalion's second Commandant's office, Serhiy Drobotun, was killed in action on 21 July 2024. On 26 October 2024, the commander of the 1st branch of the 2nd operational platoon, Anton Anatoliyovych Zarenka, was killed while successfully stopping a Russian assault aimed at bypassing the battalion's positions and get behind their lines in Verbove.

== Structure ==
The structure of the battalion is as follows:

- 4th Nuclear Power Plant Defense Battalion
  - Management and Headquarters
  - Object Commandant's Office
  - 1st Special Commandant's Office
    - 1st Operational Platoon
    - 2nd Operational Platoon
    - Reaction Platoon
  - 2nd Special Commandant's Office
    - 1st Operational Platoon
    - 2nd Operational Platoon
    - Reaction Platoon
  - Special Purpose Platoon
    - Special Cargo Protection Group
    - Capture Group;
    - Artillery Support Group
    - Robotic Intelligence Complexes Department
  - Combat and Logistical Support Platoon
    - Canine Group
    - Engineering, Technical Support and Communications Platoon
    - ITZO Service department
    - Documents and Communications Group
    - Medical Center

== Commanders ==
- Colonel Oleg Khudoliy (2017-)

== Sources ==
- Військовій частині 3044 виповнилось 35 років
- Гвардійці військової частини 3044 тренувались в діях з ліквідації наслідків надзвичайних ситуацій на АЕС
- На Львівщині завершили підготовку екіпажів БТРів
- Військова частина, що охороняє об'єкти ЮУАЕС, провела навчально-польові збори для старшокласників
