= Turboatom =

Ukrainian state-owned engineering company

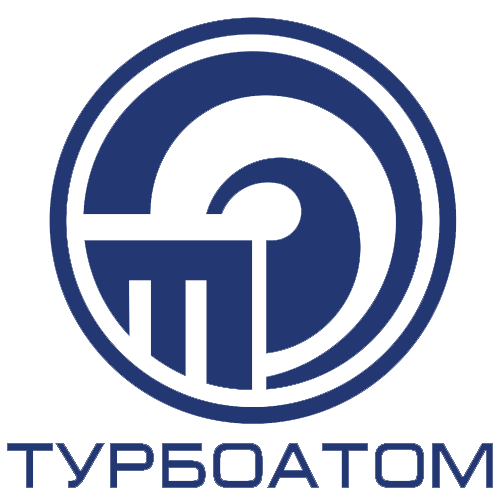
- Native name: Турбоатом
- Company type: State-owned enterprise
- Industry: Power engineering
- Founded: 1934
- Headquarters: Kharkiv, Ukraine
- Net income: ▲ ₴1.7 billion (2014)
- Number of employees: 4773 (2015)
- Website: ukrenergymachines.com/en

Ukrainian Energy Machines Joint Stock Company "Turboatom", commonly known as just Turboatom (Ukrainian: Турбоатом), is a state enterprise responsible for power engineering in Ukraine. The company specializes in the production and maintenance of steam and other turbines for thermal power stations; nuclear power plants and cogeneration plants; hydraulic turbines for hydroelectric power stations and pumped storage power plants; gas turbines and combined cycle turbines for thermal power plants; and other power equipment.

Turboatom is among the top ten turbine construction companies in the world, amongst other major companies such as General Electric, Siemens, Alstom, JSC Power Machines, Andritz Hydro, and Voith.

== History ==
=== 1929–1940 Foundation and commissioning ===
On 1 May 1932, the first stage of the turbogenerator plant was commissioned. Its design capacity was consistent with production of 1.5 million kW per year of steam turbines. Four workshops were put into service: blade, tool, workshop of different parts and workshop of discs and diaphragms.

Achievements in 1932 included:

- First hydroelectric generator for Dzoraget Hydroelectric Power Station
- Diesel-generator set for Turkestan–Siberia Railway
- Renovation of 10 regional power plants and 12 turbines with a total capacity of 134 MW
- Production of turbine blades that previously were imported from abroad

By the end of 1932, development of the first design of a turbogenerator with a capacity of 50 MW was completed. In early 1933, three more workshops were commissioned: large machining, winding and assembly. At the end of the year, production of 24 types of blades was mastered and turbines were refurbished for Kashira Power Plant and some other power plants.

=== 1940–1950 World War II and postwar years ===
During World War II, the plant suspended turbine production and began manufacture of defense products, such as mortars, and repaired tanks. The work at the enterprise was suspended only three days before the beginning of the occupation of Kharkiv on 21 October 1941. Meanwhile, an evacuation process was in full swing. During the evacuation, "Turboatom" was divided into several parts. On 23 August 1943, Kharkiv was freed and rehabilitation of the enterprise began.

A team of turbine constructors restored the native plant and continued to manufacture products while also participating in the restoration of municipal services. In late 1944, the plant already had 374 (out of 700) items of machine tools and other production equipment installed in accordance with the plant rehabilitation project. In a year, 250 machine tools were installed and commissioned. The number of workers and employees of the plant rapidly increased from 876 to 1664 persons in a year.

In 1944 for city of Kharkiv were restored and equipped four turbines with total capacity of 68 thousand kW; two turbines with capacity of 22 thousand kilowatt for Kyiv and also erected turbines for Sevastopl, Kaluga, and Shterov Power Station total capacity of 28,200 kW.

Achievements in 1944 included:

- Four turbines with a total capacity of 68 thousand kW restored and equipped for the city of Kharkiv
- Two turbines with a capacity of 22 thousand kilowatt for Kyiv
- Erection of turbines for Sevastopl, Kaluga, and Shterov Power Stations with a total capacity of 28,200 kW

=== Development of nuclear turbine construction ===
Turboatom began serial production of MK-30 turbines with a capacity of 30 MW for mining and chemical centers with experimental reactors. The first Kharkiv MK-30 turbine began operations in December 1958 in Tomsk.

In the early 1970s, manufacture of turbines for nuclear power plants with a capacity of 500 MW was approved. This allowed a sharp reduction in capital expenditure on the construction of power plants. Turbines of this type are installed at:

- Leningrad Nuclear Power Plant (the world's largest)
- Kursk Nuclear Power Plant
- Smolensk Nuclear Power Plant

In the 1970s, Turboatom was identified as a leading enterprise in designing and manufacturing powerful steam turbines for nuclear power plants.

In 1982–1985 the company mastered manufacture of steam turbines with a capacity of 1000 MW for the following NPPs:

- South Ukraine Nuclear Power Plant
- Kalinin Nuclear Power Plant
- Zaporizhzhia Nuclear Power Plant
- Balakovo Nuclear Power Plant
- Rostov Nuclear Power Plant
- Kozloduy Nuclear Power Plant (Bulgaria)

== Developments since 1991 ==
In 1998, Turboatom backed out of a plan to help Russia construct a NPP in Iran, following pressure from US president Bill Clinton. The multi-million dollar deal would have provided 25 to 30 percent of the factory's total output over five years, and the backing-out was thus regarded as a severe blow to the regional economy by 2000.

In 2012 while visiting the site, then president Viktor Yanukovych called the company "Energoatom" instead of Turboatom three times during his visit. This is an example of a yanukism.

American utility company Westinghouse Electric signed a memorandum of understanding (MOU) with Turboatom in 2017 in order to assist in the upgrading of Ukraine's 13 VVER-1000 reactors. Another MOU followed in 2018 with Japanese power and engineering company Toshiba Energy Systems & Solutions Corporation.

At the end of July 2018, the company's specialists produced high-pressure cylinders CNT-1 to Armenian Nuclear Power Plant.

In 2019 Energoatom and Turboatom signed a five-year contract to modernise condensers and turbines at a number of Ukrainian nuclear power plants.

=== Privatization ===
On 10 December 2010, the privatisation of Ukraine’s strategic enterprises was authorised, after which the Cypriot company Linfot Limited purchased a 15% stake in Turboatom.

In 2017, the National Reforms Council floated the idea that Turboatom could be privatized. At that time, the state held a controlling stake of roughly 75 percent in the company, with Ukrainian Prime Minister Volodymyr Groysman arguing that the state should continue to control a stake of at least 51 percent after privatization.

A governmental committee approved the transfer of the state's 75 percent stake into private hands in May 2018. However, the government terminated any privatization process of the company in 2019 by removing Turboatom from a list of companies cleared for privatization.

== See also ==
- Energoatom
