= Energoatom =

Ukrainian public nuclear company

Public JSC 'National Nuclear Energy Generating Company "Energoatom"'
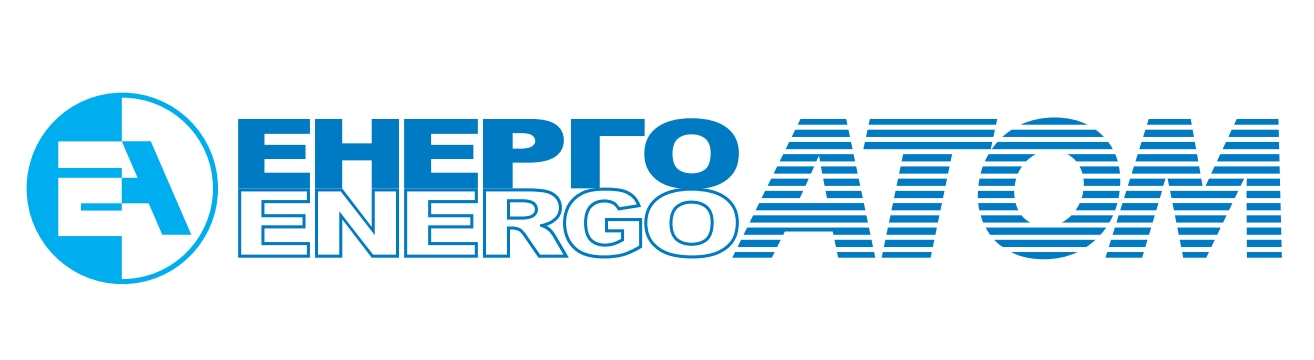
- Official logo
- Native name: ПАТ «Національна атомна енергогенеруюча компанія "Енергоатом"»
- Type: Public enterprise
- Industry: Nuclear power
- Founded: 17 October 1996
- Headquarters: Kyiv, Ukraine
- Revenue: 254,692,849,000 hryvnia (2025)
- Total assets: 416,763,079,000 hryvnia (2025)
- Owner: Government of Ukraine
- Website: energoatom.com.ua/en/

The Public JSC National nuclear energy generating company "Energoatom" (Ukrainian: ПАТ 'НАЕК "Енергоатом"', romanized: PAT NAEK 'Enerhoatom') is the public enterprise operating all four nuclear power plants in Ukraine (Zaporizhzhia, Rivne, South Ukraine, and Khmelnytskyi). It is the largest producer of electricity in Ukraine.

== Overview ==
State Enterprise "National Nuclear Energy Generating Company Energoatom" was founded in October 1996. The company operates four nuclear power plants in Ukraine consisting of 15 units (13 VVER-1000 units and 2 VVER-440 units) with a total installed capacity of 13,835 MW. The company also operates two hydroelectric units at the Oleksandrivska Hydroelectric Plant with the installed capacity of 25 MW and three hydroelectric units at the Tashlyk Pumped-Storage Power Plant with the installed capacity of 453 MW (the hydroelectric unit No. 3 was connected to the power system in 2022).

Ukraine ranks seventh in the world and second in Europe in terms of the number of nuclear reactors operated and total capacity. Energoatom provides about 55% of Ukraine's electricity needs.

The total number of employees as of the beginning of 2022 is 33,969 employees.

The organizational and legal form of Energoatom is a state enterprise.

The founder is the Cabinet of Ministers of Ukraine. The enterprise was set up in 1996 under the Ordinance of the Cabinet of Ministers of Ukraine "On the establishment of the National Nuclear Energy Generating Company "Energoatom" dated 17.10.1996 No. 1268 on the basis of the property and infrastructures of nuclear power plants – Zaporizhzhya NPP, Rivne NPP, South Ukraine NPP, Khmelnytskyi NPP and Chornobyl NPP. In 2001, the Chornobyl NPP was withdrawn from the SE NNEGC "Energoatom".

In 2021, the Cabinet of Ministers of Ukraine, by the Decree No. 50-r dated 20 January, took over the functions of managing the unified property complex of the SE NNEGC "Energoatom".

The main types of economic activity are set out in detail in the Charter of Energoatom, in particular: The enterprise was established with the purpose of producing electric energy, ensuring safe operation and increasing the efficiency of nuclear power plants, safety during construction, commissioning and decommissioning of nuclear installations, uninterrupted energy supply to business entities and the population, as well as within its competence to ensure permanent readiness of Ukraine for quick and effective actions in the event of accidents at nuclear power plants, radiation accidents in industry, compliance with the requirements of nuclear legislation, norms and rules on nuclear and radiation safety.

In accordance with the Ordinance of the Cabinet of Ministers of Ukraine dated 17 October 1996 No. 1268, the company is entrusted with the functions of an operating organization. The objectives of Energoatom are the safe production of electricity; increasing the safety level of operating NPP power units and extending their period of operation; construction of NPP power units and their decommissioning; purchase of fresh nuclear fuel and removal of spent fuel; creation of a national infrastructure for handling irradiated nuclear fuel; physical protection of nuclear installations and nuclear materials; staff training and advanced training of personnel; solving social issues of employees, etc.

Energoatom is included in the list of enterprises of strategic importance for the economy and security of the state (the Ordinance of the Cabinet of Ministers of Ukraine dated 3 April 2015 No. 83 "On approval of the list of state-owned objects of strategic importance for the economy and security of the state").

Energoatom belongs to the economic entities that own and use high-risk facilities (in accordance with the requirements of the Law of Ukraine "On High-Risk Facilities" dated 18 January 2001 No. 2245-ІІІ).

The NPPs of Energoatom belong to the city-forming enterprises. In the cities of Energodar, Varash, Pivdennoukrainsk, Netishyn the number of NPP employees (including their family members) is more than half of the population of the administrative-territorial unit in which the nuclear power plant is located.

Energoatom is a member of international organizations: WANO (World Association of Nuclear Operators), WNA (World Nuclear Association), EUR (European Utility Requirements), IFNEC (International Forum for Cooperation in the Field of Nuclear Energy), European Clean Hydrogen Alliance. On 31 March 2022, the Board of Governors of the WANO at its meeting supported the application of Energoatom and made a decision regarding the transfer of the company, together with all its plants and nuclear power units, to the Paris Center of the WANO.

== Recent history ==
In 2011 Energoatom began a project to bring safety into line with international standards at an estimated cost of $1.8 billion, with a target completion date of 2017. In 2015 the completion date was put back to 2020, due to financing delays.

In 2015 some government agencies made corruption allegations against Energoatom, with concerns raised by Prime Minister Arseniy Yatsenyuk. In March 2016, Energoatom's assets and bank accounts were frozen by Ukrainian courts over allegedly unpaid debts; Energoatom appealed the decision, but the frozen finances led to contractual breaches. In June 2016 its bank accounts were unfrozen.

In July 2019, a new wholesale energy market for Ukraine was launched, intended to bring real competition to the generation market and help future integration with Europe. The change was a prerequisite for receiving European Union assistance. It led to increased prices for industrial consumers of between 14% to 28% during July. The bulk of Energoatom output was sold to the government's "guaranteed buyer" to keep prices more stable for domestic customers.

On 27 November 2019, Prime Minister Oleksiy Honcharuk announced the dismissal of Energoatom CEO Yuriy Nedashkovskyi. The Ministry of Energy website later stated the dismissal was "for reasons including inefficient management, suspicion of embezzlement of state funds and mismanagement of procurement." Energoatom subsequently issued a press release rebutting these charges.

On 4 December 2019, Ukraine's government appointed Pavlo Pavlyshyn as acting head of Energoatom. During January 2020 Energoatom discussed eight legislative bills with Ostap Shypaylo, chairman of the Ukrainian parliament subcommittee on nuclear energy and safety, aimed at meeting international obligations and standards, and the financial stabilisation of Energoatom. In and after January 2020 three long-standing vice presidents were replaced. On 6 May 2020 the Ukrainian Cabinet appointed Herman Galushchenko, a lawyer, vice-president for long-term development and Hartmut Jakob, a financier and energy sector specialist, as vice-president of the financial and economic department. This followed months of disputes as to whether the posts should go to nuclear specialists from inside Energoatom or not, during a difficult financial period for the company.

In early 2020 mounting debts caused Energoatom to adjust its new fuel delivery schedule. No purchases of Westinghouse nuclear fuel were made in the first quarter. Energoatom had fuel stocks for a year of refuelling. The difficult financial condition was caused by late payments by the 'Guaranteed Buyer' under the new wholesale market regulations. Energoatom wanted to be allowed to increase bilateral contract sales from 5% to 50% of generation.

On 20 January 2021, Ukraine's government decided to transfer management from the Energy Ministry to direct government control. This was on the instructions of the President Zelenskyy, to improve the management of Energoatom. This would also part satisfy the conditions of the European Union Third Energy Package to separate transmission system operators, producers and suppliers to end users of electricity. On 24 February 2022, the Ukrainian electricity grid disconnected from the post-Soviet IPS/UPS grid, ahead of synchronising with the synchronous grid of Continental Europe.

On 22 June 2024, Ukraine's government appointed the supervisory board of Energoatom. It consists of 5 members, three of whom are independent, and two are state representatives. The selected members include Timothy John Sohn, Michael Elliot Crist, Jarek Neverovich, Vitalii Petruk, and Tymofii Mylovanov. On 21 August 2025, the supervisory board dismissed Energoatom's CEO, Petro Kotin, without explanation.

On 10 November 2025, the National Anti-Corruption Bureau of Ukraine (NABU) announced a large investigation into the energy sector, alleging a kickback scheme involving Energoatom existed with a $100 million rake-off. It alleged a government adviser and the Energoatom security director had taken control of company purchasing and forced contractors to pay a 10–15% corrupt fee to avoid contracts being blocked. NABU had gathered 1,000 hours of telephone and audio recordings as evidence over the previous 15 months, and started searching Energoatom offices. Following this announcement, Energoatom supervisory board was dismissed, and Justice Minister German Galushchenko and Energy Minister Svitlana Grynchuk resigned after President Zelenskyy called for them to step down.

== The separated subdivisions of Energoatom ==
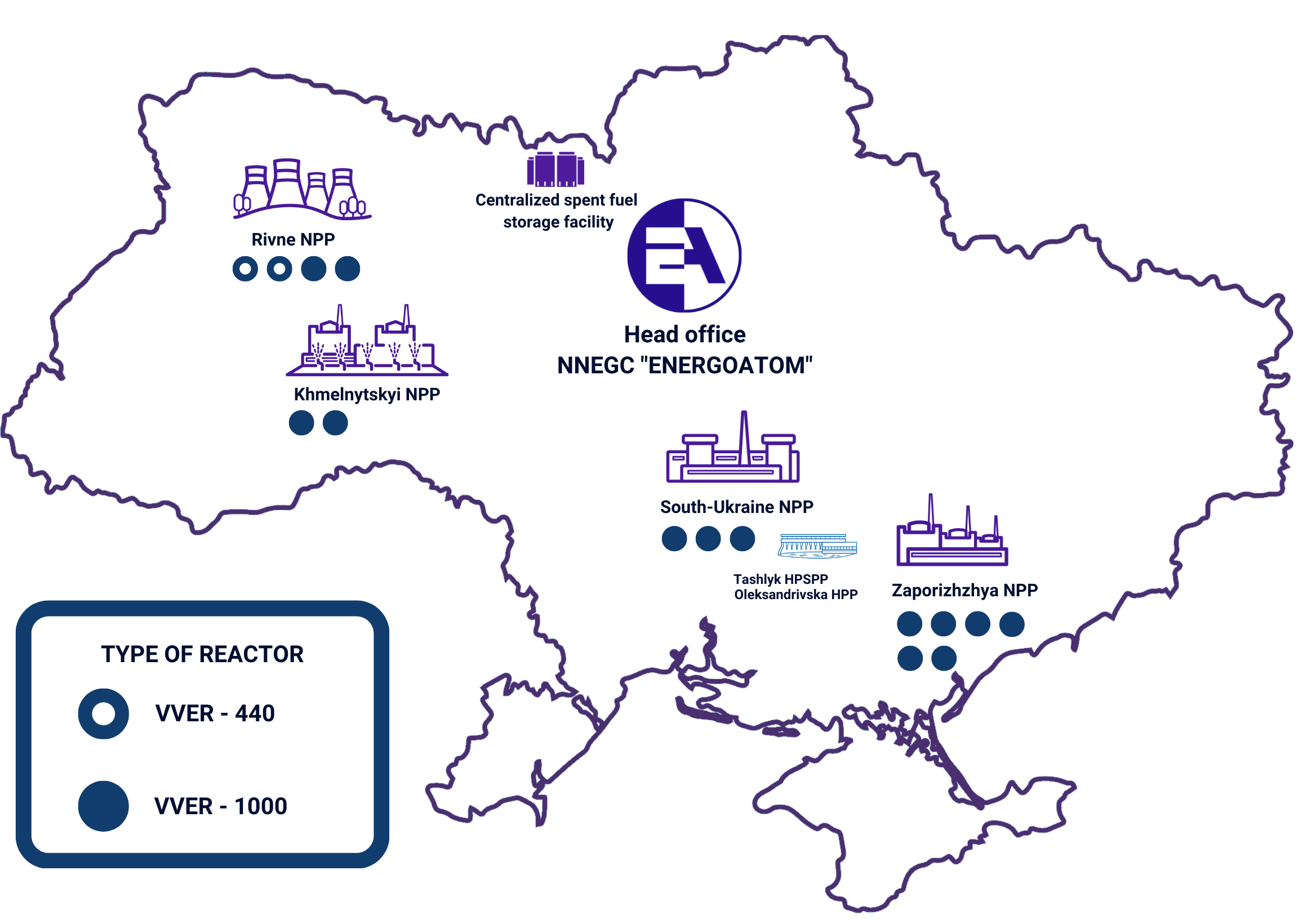
Schematic map of the location of Ukraine's 4 nuclear power plants and nuclear waste center.

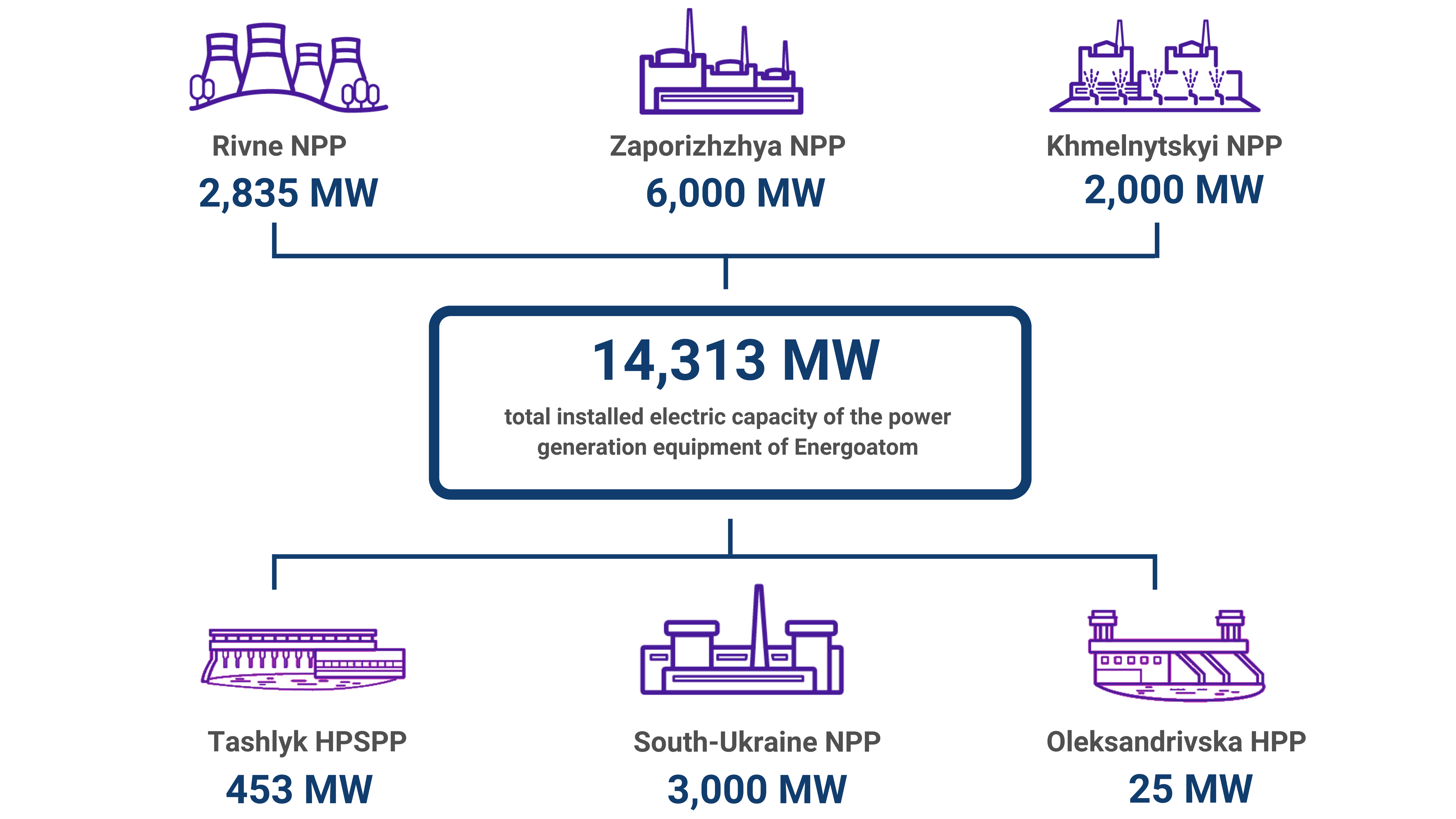
The total installed electrical capacity of the generating property of SE NNEGC "Energoatom"

- Zaporizhzhia NPP.
- Rivne NPP.
- Pivdennoukrainsk NPP.
- Khmelnytskyi NPP.
- SS "Atomremontservice".
- SS "Atomenergomash'.
- SS "Centralized purchasing".
- SS "Atomprojectengineering".
- SS "Emergency Technical Center".
- SS "Scientific&Technical Center".
- SS "Warehouse".
- SS "DO "Atomprylad".
- SS "Automation&Mechanical Engineering".
- SS "Energoatom-Trading".
- SS "Administrative Department".
- SS "Donuzlavska WPP" (located in the temporarily occupied territory).

== Nuclear power stations ==
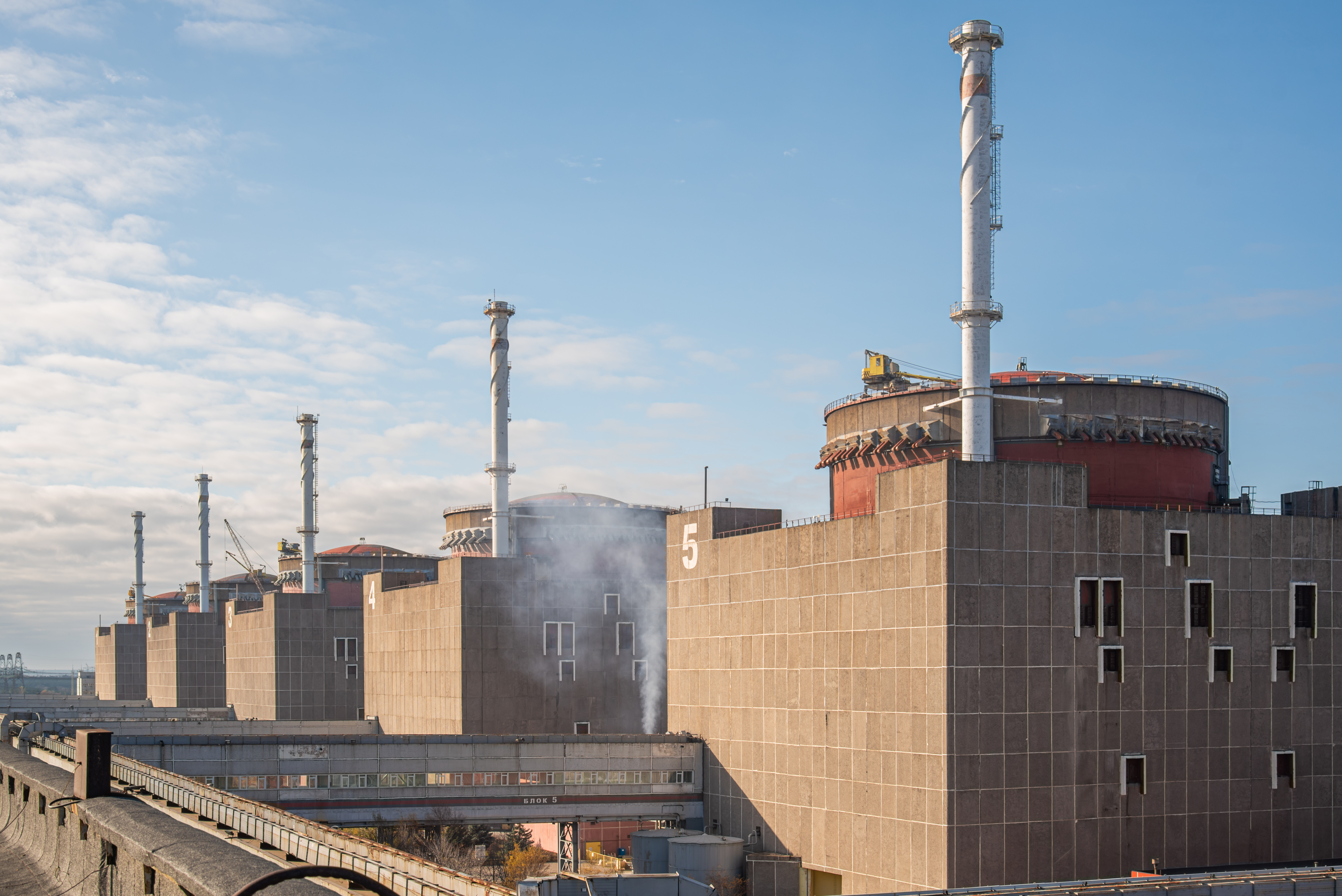
Zaporizhzhya NPP

=== Zaporizhzhya NPP ===
- Start of construction – 1979.
- The commissioning of the first power unit – 1984.
- 6 VVER-1000 units with a total installed capacity of 6000 MW.
- Satellite city – Energodar, Zaporizhzhia region.

The largest nuclear power plant in Ukraine and Europe. It is located near the steppe zone on the shore of the Kakhovka Reservoir. Over the years of its existence, it has produced more than 1.1 trillion kWh of electricity. It has its own dry storage facility for spent nuclear fuel (Dry SFSF).

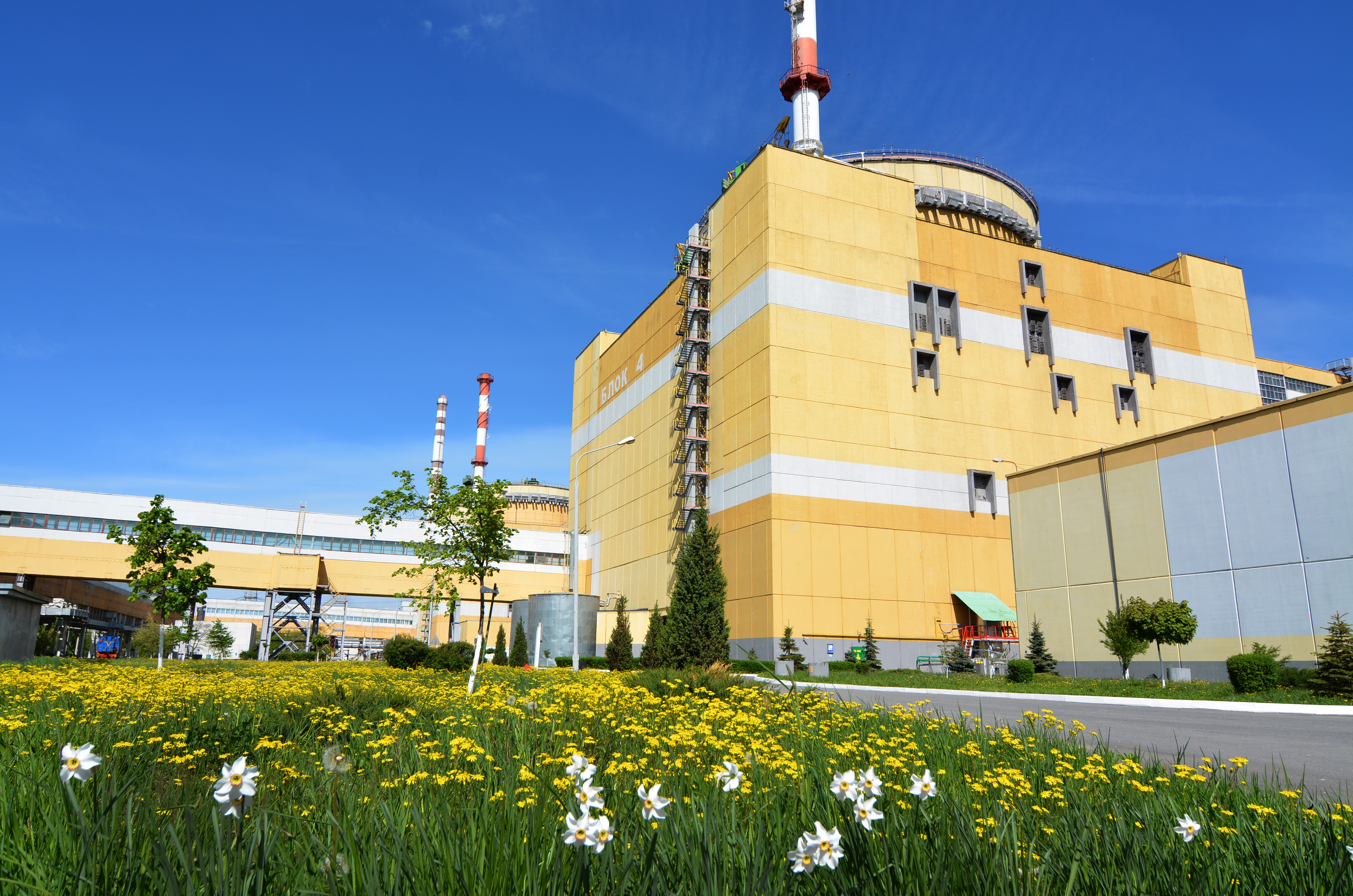
Rivne NPP

=== Rivne NPP ===
- Start of construction – 1973.
- The commissioning of the first power unit – 1980.
- 2 VVER-440 units та 2 VVER-1000 units with a total installed capacity of 2835 MW.
- Satellite city – Varash, Rivne region.

The first nuclear power plant in Ukraine with power water-cooled reactors of the VVER type. The annual production of electricity is about 20 billion kWh. The RNPP operates an automated radiation monitoring system (ARMS) equipped with seismic monitoring systems and RODOS (Real Time Online Decision Support) decision support system. This energy complex is notable in Ukraine for the accuracy of its operating parameters and technical characteristics.

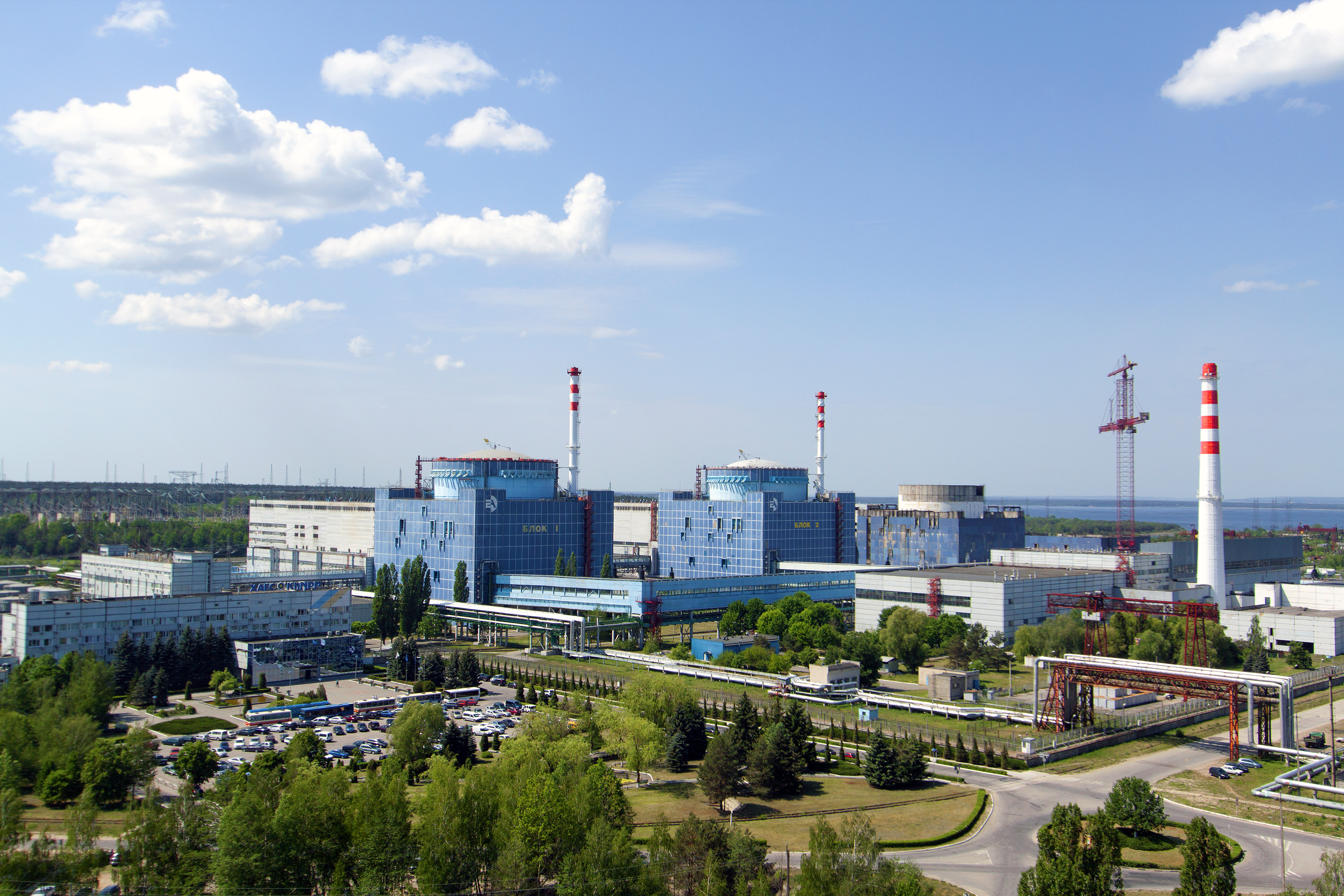
Khmelnytskyi NPP

=== Khmelnytskyi NPP ===
- Start of construction – 1981.
- The commissioning of the first power unit – 1987.
- 2 VVER-1000 units with a total installed capacity of 2000 MW.
- Satellite city – Netishyn, Khmelnytskyi region.

The most promising Ukrainian nuclear power plant in terms of realizing Ukraine's export potential on the European energy market. It is located near the central part of Western Ukraine, on the border of three regions - Khmelnytskyi, Rivne and Ternopil. The power plant generates almost 15 billion kWh of electricity per year.

=== South Ukrainian Energy Complex ===
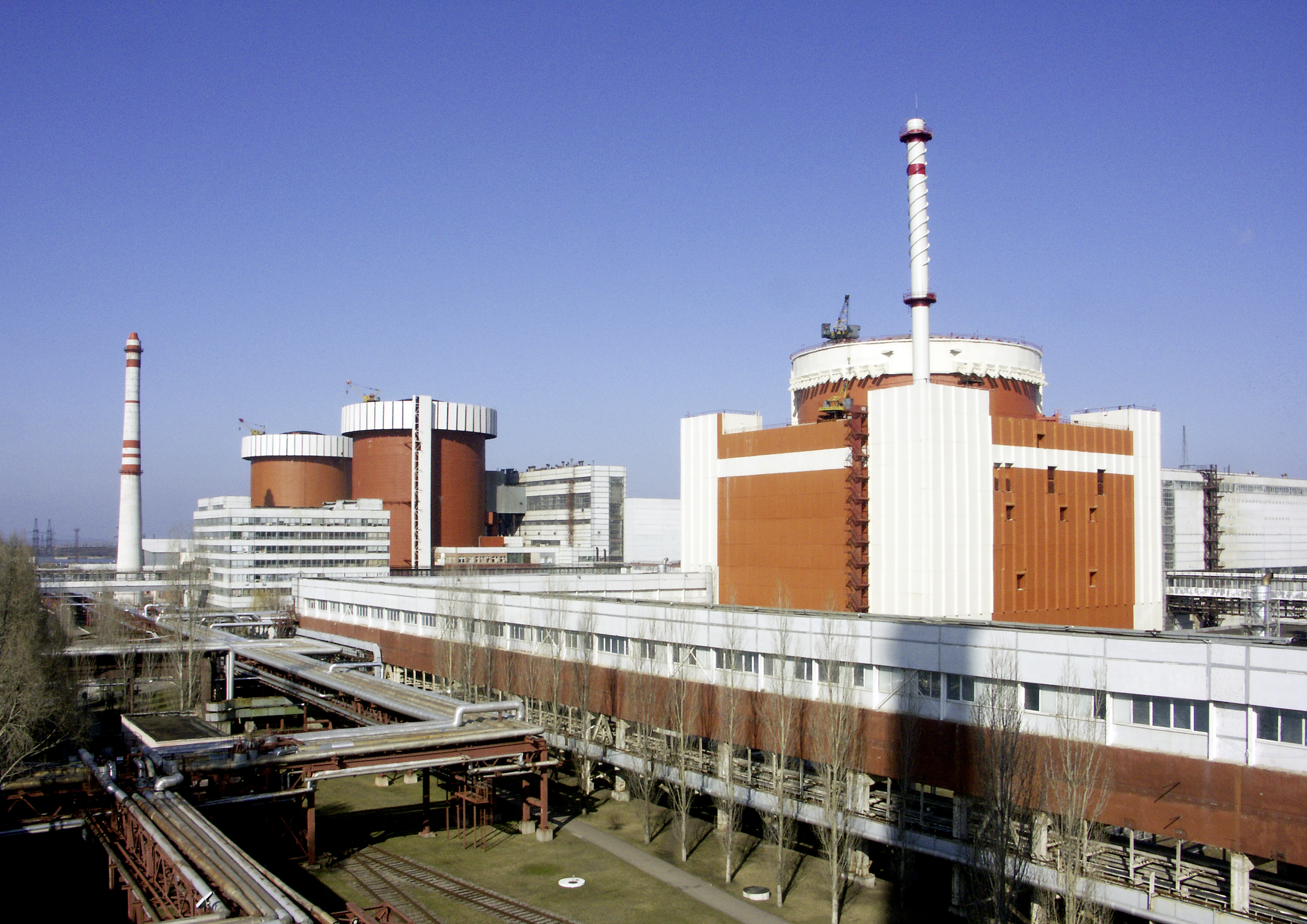
South Ukraine NPP

==== South Ukraine NPP ====
- Start of construction – 1975.
- The commissioning of the first power unit – 1982.
- 3 VVER-1000 units with a total installed capacity of 3000 MW.
- Satellite city – Pivdennoukrainsk, Mykolaiv region.

==== Oleksandrivka Hydroelectric Plant ====
- 2 hydroelectric units with the installed capacity of 25 MW

==== Tashlyk Pumped-Storage Power Plant ====
- 3 hydroelectric units with the installed capacity of 453 MW

The South Ukrainian Energy Complex uses basic nuclear as well as flexible hydro and hydro-storage capacities. It is located in the north of the Mykolaiv region, on the banks of the South Bug River. The complex produces 17-20 billion kWh of electricity per year. For the first time in Ukraine, the SUNPP was loaded with fresh nuclear fuel produced by the American company Westinghouse. This fuel load has paved the way for Ukraine's successful diversification of nuclear fuel supplies. Since 2018, power unit No. 3, and since 2020, power unit No. 2 of the SUNPP have been operating on Westinghouse fuel only.

== Safety of NPPs ==
The policy of Energoatom prioritizes the issues of security over economic, technical, scientific and other objectives. The objective of increasing and maintaining the current level of operating power units' safety has the highest priority in the activities of the operating organization. Energoatom's nuclear power plants use the nuclear and radiation technologies; therefore, the main mission of the company is an unconditional observance of nuclear and radiation safety with cost-effective generation and reliable supply of electricity and heat to consumers.

In the NPP surveillance zones, the Automated Radiation Monitoring Systems (ARMS) have been created for continuous monitoring of the radiation situation.

International experts have monitored the safety of Ukrainian nuclear power plants for many years: the periodic meetings are held at the IAEA to comply with the provisions of the Convention on Nuclear Safety; there is a safety monitoring by international experts (OSART, ASSET, WANO missions) organized within the framework of cooperation.

Increasing the reliability and efficiency of operating NPPs is implemented through the Comprehensive Consolidated Safety Upgrade Program of Power Units of Nuclear Power Plants (CCSUP - approved by the Ordinance of the Cabinet of Ministers of Ukraine (CMU) dated 07.12.2011 No. 1270. The Ordinance of the CMU dated 08.05.2019 No. 390 amended the Ordinance of the CMU dated 07.12.2011 No. 1270 and extended the period of validity of the CCSUP until 12.31.2023. The Ordinance of the CMU dated 07.11.2018 No. 924 increased the amount of funding for the CCSUP. Due to the military aggression of the Russian federation, Energoatom on its own initiative developed a draft ordinance on amending the Ordinance of the CMU dated 07.12.2011 No. 1270 regarding the extension of the term of the CCSUP until 31.12.2025) and the Comprehensive Consolidated Program for Improving the Efficiency and Reliability of NPP Power Units Operation.

CCSUP was developed based on the recommendations of the joint project of the European Commission, the IAEA and Ukraine on improving safety and implementing post-Fukushima measures at NPP power units in order to increase the level of safety and reliability of operation of nuclear power units; reducing risks of the accidents at nuclear power plants during natural disasters or other extreme situations; increasing the efficiency of managing project and off-project accidents at nuclear power plants, minimizing their consequences.

Date of Implementation of the Program: 2011–2023.

The purpose of the implementation of the Comprehensive Consolidated Safety Upgrade Program of Power Units of Nuclear Power Plants is:

- implementation of the recommendations of the IAEA and other international organizations regarding the improvement of the safety level of power units of Ukrainian nuclear power plants;
- fulfillment of the requirements of the current domestic nuclear legislation and legislation in the field of civil defense regarding the company's readiness to act in conditions of threat and occurrence of nuclear and radiation accidents, man-made and natural emergencies.
- implementation of measures aimed at preventing accidents similar to the accident at the Fukushima NPP;
- replacement of the safety important equipment with the modern one.

The CCSUP contains 1,295 measures, of which 1,070 have been implemented as of 2022.

Energoatom also implements post-Fukushima measures aimed at preventing accidents during natural disasters or other extreme situations, minimizing the consequences of such accidents; increasing the efficiency of project and off-project accident management at nuclear power plants, minimizing their consequences. In total, 90% of the 238 post-Fukushima measures have already been implemented as of 2022.

== Construction of new Nuclear Power Units in Ukraine ==
On August 31, 2021, in Washington (USA), Energoatom and Westinghouse signed a Memorandum of Understanding, which provides for the construction of five nuclear power units in Ukraine using AP1000 technology.

On 2 June 2022, at the site of the Khmelnytskyi NPP, a Declaration was signed on the start of practical implementation of the joint project of Energoatom and Westinghouse on the construction of AP1000 power units at the site of the Khmelnytskyi NPP.

On the same day, Energoatom and Westinghouse signed a Memorandum on expanding cooperation, which provides for an increase in the number of AP1000 power units planned for construction from five to nine, as well as the establishment of a Westinghouse engineering center in Ukraine to support AP1000 projects planned for implementation in Ukraine and Europe. In addition, this Memorandum provides for operation support of the operating power units of Ukraine's NPPs and future decommissioning works.

Key stages of the pilot project implementation:

- preparation and conclusion of an intergovernmental agreement on cooperation between Ukraine and the United States in the construction of AP1000 nuclear power units in Ukraine;
- preparation and adoption of a draft law of Ukraine "On the placement, design and construction of power units at the Khmelnytskyi NPP site";
- obtaining licenses for the construction and commissioning of two AP1000 power units at the Khmelnytskyi NPP site.

== Managing spent nuclear fuel at Ukrainian NPPs ==
Ukraine fulfills its obligations in all aspects of handling spent nuclear fuel in accordance with the requirements of the "Joint Convention on the Safety of Spent Fuel Management and on the Safety of Radioactive Waste Management" (Joint Convention) ratified by the Verkhovna Rada of Ukraine on 20 April 2022.

In accordance with the Joint Convention, the State bears responsibility for the safe handling of spent fuel and radioactive waste.

During the Soviet Union times, a technical scheme existed under which spent fuel from Ukrainian nuclear plants was taken to temporary storage facilities on the territory of the Russian federation for its further processing. After the collapse of the USSR, the Russian side began to charge a significant fee for the processing of Ukrainian spent fuel. As a result, the radioactive waste generated during processing had to be returned to Ukraine in accordance with the aforementioned Convention.

=== Dry spent nuclear fuel storage at Zaporizhzhia NPP ===
Ukraine has obtained a positive experience in coping with spent nuclear fuel management issues. In the 1990s, due to yet another restriction imposed by the Russian federation regarding the repatriation of spent nuclear fuel, Zaporizhzhia NPP power units faced the peril of being stopped. This has prompted the plant to build and commission in 2001 a temporal dry storage of a container type for its spent fuel with Duke Engineering&Services and Sierra Nuclear Corporation design, which allows storing for a fifty-year period.

=== Centralized repository for spent nuclear fuel (CRSNF) ===
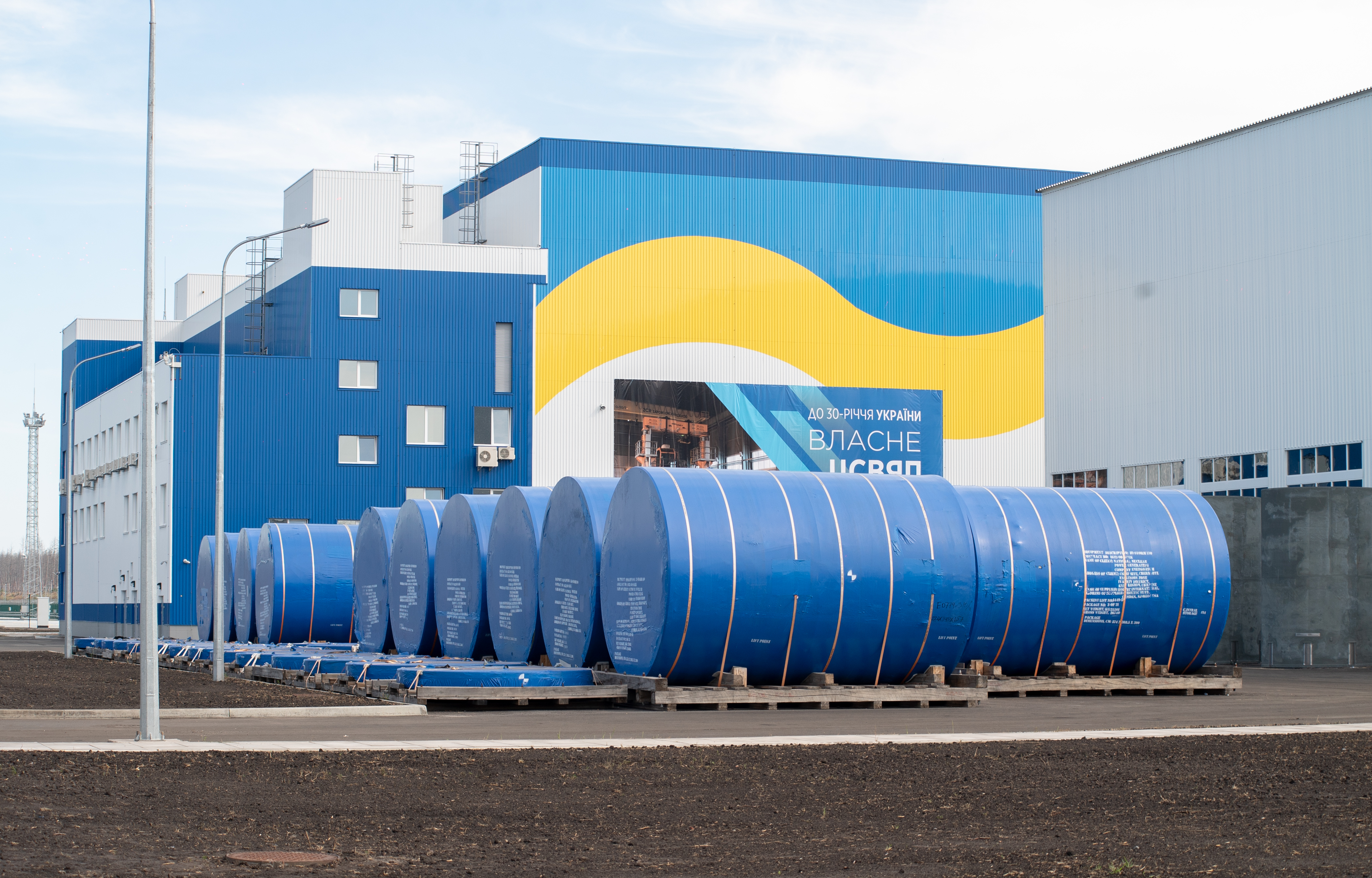
Centralized repository for spent nuclear fuel

In 2003 Energoatom announced an international tender to determine the company for construction of a centralized repository for spent nuclear fuel of dry type in Ukraine for previously mentioned NPPs. The US company Holtec International won the tender and at the end of 2005 signed an agreement on designing, licensing, construction and commissioning the repository designed for 100 years of storage.

According to Ukrainian legislation, the CRSNF site is located between the former villages of Stara Krasnytsia, Buriakivka, Chystogolivka, and Stechanka in the Kyiv region on the territory of the Exclusion Zone, which suffered from the Chornobyl nuclear catastrophe causing radioactive contamination.

Storage of spent fuel at the CRSNF is implemented with the "dry" technology introduced by Holtec International. This technology obtained a license from the U.S. Nuclear Regulatory Commission and was tested in the US, Spain, and Great Britain, implemented in Switzerland, China, and considered for implementation in Sweden.

A dual-use character of the chosen technology for the CRSNF provides storage and transportation of spent fuel without additional equipment.

The SNF storage system implies the following three functions:

- safe and hermetic localization of radioactive material in a multi-purpose container (two structural barriers of a multi-purpose container (MPC), which prevent possible leakage of radionuclides from spent assemblies to the environment);
- safe long-term storage in a protective installation (HI-STORM container), which prevents direct effects of ionizing radiation generated from spent assemblies on the environment and personnel.
- protection of spent heat-releasing assemblies from extreme natural and man-made influences during their storage.

A double barrier of radioactive substances localization in a special container (MPC) provides safe spent fuel storage that at each stage of handling spent fuel resides in special protective containers meeting all national requirements ensuring radiation safety.

On 25 April 2022, the State Nuclear Regulatory Inspectorate of Ukraine issued a separate permit for commissioning the CRSNF. The permit was scheduled on 9 March, but was postponed due to Russian aggression and temporary occupation of the Chornobyl Exclusion Zone.

The operation of the CRSNF allows Ukraine to finally get rid of its dependence on Russian enterprises' monopoly on processing and storage of spent nuclear fuel, as well as to save about 200 million US dollars annually by abandoning the Russian services.

== Company's investment projects ==
Investment projects implemented by "Energoatom" intend to guarantee the safe and reliable operation of its NPPs, prolong the term of power units' operation and create the enabling environment for the energy independence of Ukraine. The main projects are:

- Carrying out preparatory work for the construction start of the KhNPP power units No. 5 and No. 6.
- Implementation of the construction project of new power units with AP1000 design (Westinghouse) at existing and perspective sites.
- Establishing the production of fuel assemblies with Westinghouse design in Ukraine.
- Start of operation of the CRSNF and SNF acceptance from three Ukrainian NPPs.
- Commission and connection of the Tashlyk Pumped-Storage Power Plant hydropower unit No. 3
- Commissioning of spray pools No. 3, 4, 5 at the SUNPP.
- Electricity export to the EU countries.
- Research on the feasibility of SMR technology deployment in Ukraine.

== Military actions at Ukrainian NPPs ==
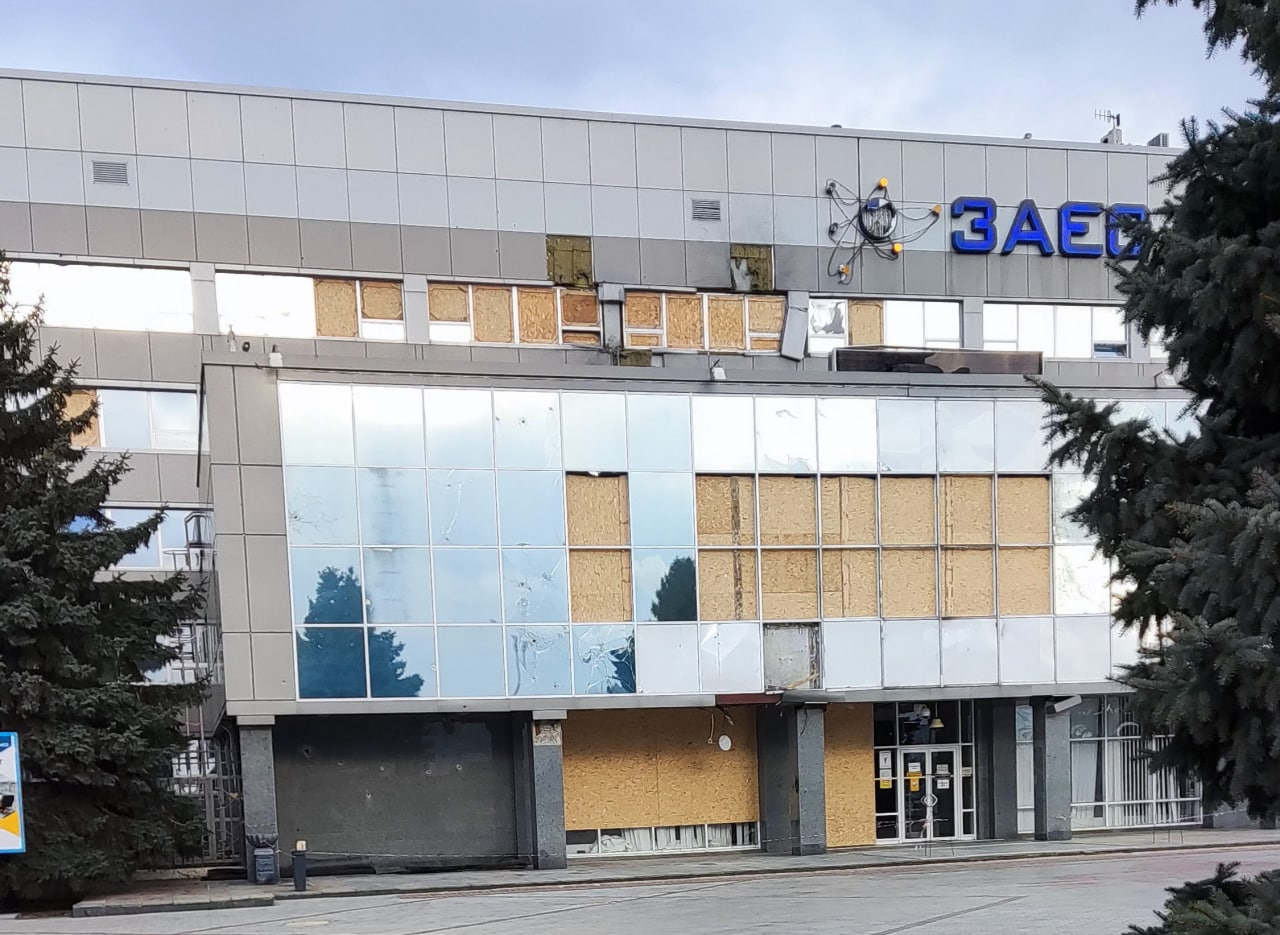
Consequences of the shelling of Zaporizhzhya NPP by the Russian military

=== Zaporizhzhia NPP occupation ===
On 4 March 2022, the Zaporizhzhia NPP came under temporary occupation. The armed seizure of the plant by the Russian military resulted in shelling that damaged one of the ZNNP Training Center buildings, the reactor building, the block transformer, as well as household premises, some buildings, structures and equipment. An immediate threat occurred to the lives of plant personnel, along with a threat of nuclear and radiation hazards and an accident. The "Zaporizhska" overhead line and the "Southern Donbaska" overhead line bore damage as well.

After the occupation of the ZNPP more than 500 troops of the Russian military force and 50 units of military equipment were located at the plant's site.

The Russian military deployed at least 14 military trucks with weapons, ammunition loads explosives in the engine hall of the ZNPP power unit No. 1 in the vicinity to the nuclear reactor blocking access of firefighting equipment and vehicles in case of fire.

Right after the occupation, the Russian enterprises "Rosatom" and "Rosenergoatom" sent a group of their employees to the ZNPP site. The "Rosenergoatom" personnel rotated three times since that. On June 2, 2022, a team of 10 Rosenergoatom employees headed by the chief engineer of the Kalininska NPP arrived at the Zaporizhzhya NPP.

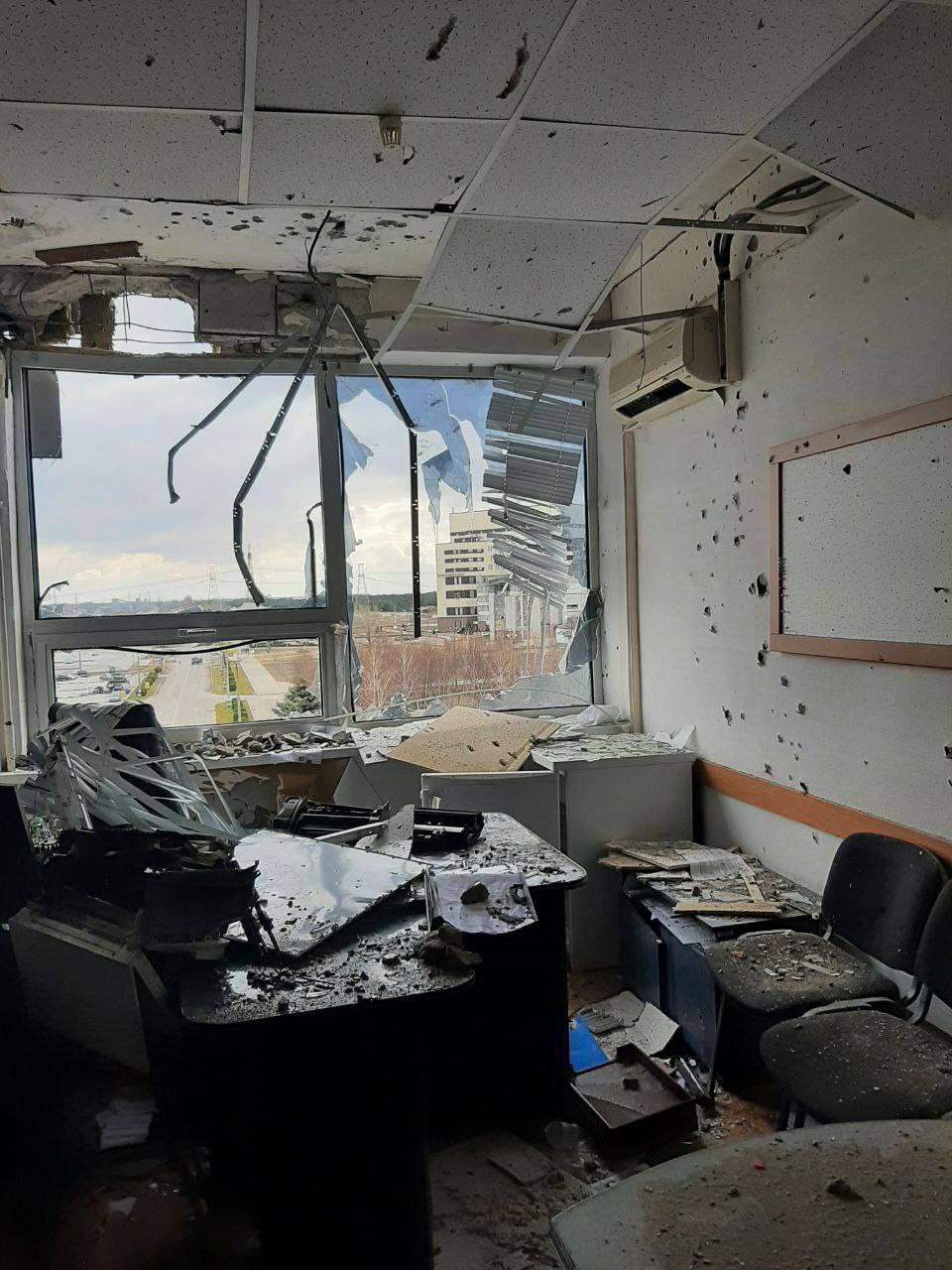
Consequences of the Russian military attack on the administrative building of the Zaporizhzhya NPP

In August–September 2022, there is constantly shelling at the ZNPP causing substantial damage to the equipment, buildings, structures, pipelines, installations of the ZNPP, which led to the emergence of nuclear and radiation hazards and a high threat of nuclear accident due to damage to power units, chemical blocks and other equipment and buildings that ensure the operation of the NPP.

On 5 August 2022, three shelling attacks occurred at the plant's site close to one of the power units. A hit appeared between the Training Center and the 750 open switchyard damaging the high-voltage line 150 kV ZNPP – ZaTPS that led to the power outage of the auxiliary transformers No. 1, 2 and the HVL 330 kV ZNPP – ZaTPS, and decreased total capacity of the ZNPP to 1000 MWe.

The electric substation "Luch" bore substantial damages in a consequence of the shelling of the town of Energodar: 6 out of 7 microdistricts remained without electricity. The water intake station ceased working and the town lost its water supply as well.

On 6 August 2022, military forces shelled the ZNPP and its satellite-town Energodar and hit in the vicinity of the dry spent nuclear fuel storage of the plant. Three radiation monitoring sensors around the ZNPP DSFSF were damaged.

On 8 August 2022, the Russian military forces continued to shell the town hitting residential buildings.

On 11 August 2022, the occupiers shelled the fire station that was aimed for the plant's needs in case of emergency.

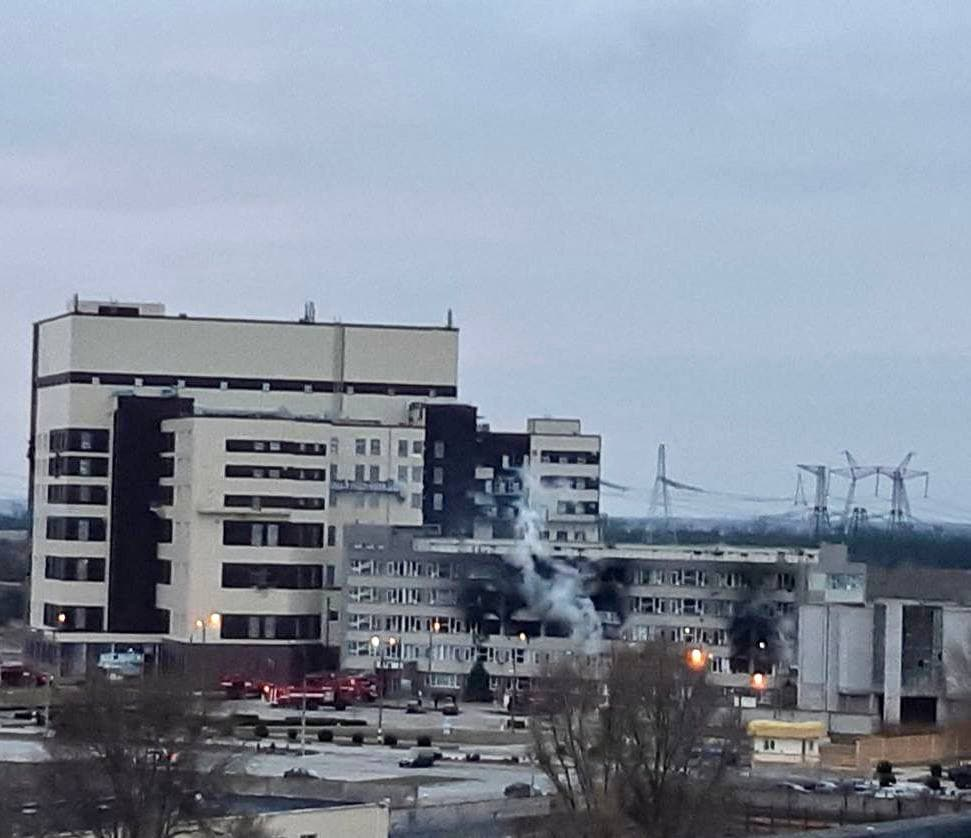
Entering the educational and training center as a result of shelling by the Russian military at the ZNPP on 4 March 2022

On 13 August 2022 the damage occurred at the open switchyard 750 kW.

On 20 August 2022, in a consequence of the shelling, windows in one of the transitional galleries were shattered.

On 25 August 2022 due to the fires at the Zaporizhzhia TPS ash damps located in the vicinity of the ZNPP, the fourth power line connecting the ZNPP with the Ukrainian power grid – overhead line 750 kW ZNPP – "Dniprovska" - went offline twice. The previous shelling had damaged three other lines. As a result, two operating power units of the plant were disconnected from the grid. The actions of the Russian military led to the complete disconnection of the ZNPP from the power grid for the first time in the plant's history.

On 21 September 2022 at 01:13 am another shelling damaged the connection equipment of unit No. 6 with the plant's open switchyard. The attack caused the disconnection of unit transformer and house load transformers. The loss of power actuated two emergency diesel generators of the safety systems to ensure cooling of the nuclear fuel from pumps.

The safety of NPPs in circumstances of warfare and occupation is a new challenge, as none of NPP in the world have ever been designed with protection from potential hostilities, bombing and missile shelling.

One person died and 10 people were seriously injured due to shelling of the ZNPP site and the satellite-town of Energodar.

The occupation forces exert psychological pressure and torture of local residents and personnel of the NPP.

Over 100 people were detained and their location is not yet known.

=== Military attacks on other NPPs ===
On 19 September 2022 the Russian military forces fired a missile attack on industrial zone of the South Ukraine Nuclear Power Plant (SUNPP) using most likely the "Iskander" missile of the "earth – earth" class. The missile hit in approximately 300 meters from the nuclear reactors. The hit weave damaged the NPP premises by shattering over 100 windows. The attack caused the shutdown of one of hydroelectric units of Oleksandrivka hydro power plant, which is a part of the SUNPP energy complex, and the high-voltage power line.

=== The IAEA mission ===
On 18 August 2022, the President of Ukraine Volodymyr Zelenskyy at the meeting with UN Secretary General António Guterres in Lviv agreed on the parameters of the International Atomic Energy Agency (IAEA) mission at the occupied Zaporizhzhia NPP.

On 1 September 2022, the IAEA mission attended the ZNPP. On the same day majority of the delegation left the occupied by the Russia facility. Six experts of the Agency remained at the Zaporizhzhia NPP.

On 3 September 2022, the IAEA Secretary General Rafael Grossi during the press conference informed world media about the primal results of the IAEA mission stay at the NPP captured by the Russian military.

On 5 September 2022, 4 out of 6 representatives of the IAEA mission team finished their work at the Zaporizhzhia NPP and lest the plant's site.

On 6 September 2022, the IAEA published a report covering the results on the ZNPP visit. In the document, the Agency calls for the urgent establishment of a safe zone around the plant in order to prevent a nuclear disaster and is ready to start consultations for the creation of such a zone. During the visit, the mission recorded damage to the buildings and structures of the plant and noted that further shelling could damage important equipment and lead to a significant release of radioactive substances.

On 7 September 2022, during the UN Security Council session regarding the situation at the ZNPP, UN Secretary General António Guterres declared "Any kind of harm caused to the nuclear facility can lead to disaster for the region and beyond. Any actions that could jeopardize the physical integrity, safety or security of the nuclear plant are unacceptable".

On 15 September 2022 the IAEA Board of Governors, which consists of 35 representatives of the UN member-countries, adopted a resolution demanding that Russia ends the occupation of the Zaporizhzhia Nuclear Power Plant.

== See also ==
- Turboatom

Unfinished nuclear power plants

- Chyhyryn Nuclear Power Plant
- Crimea Nuclear Power Plant
- Kharkiv Nuclear Power Plant
- Odesa Nuclear Power Plant
