= Tashlyk Pumped-Storage Power Plant =

Ukrainian power plant

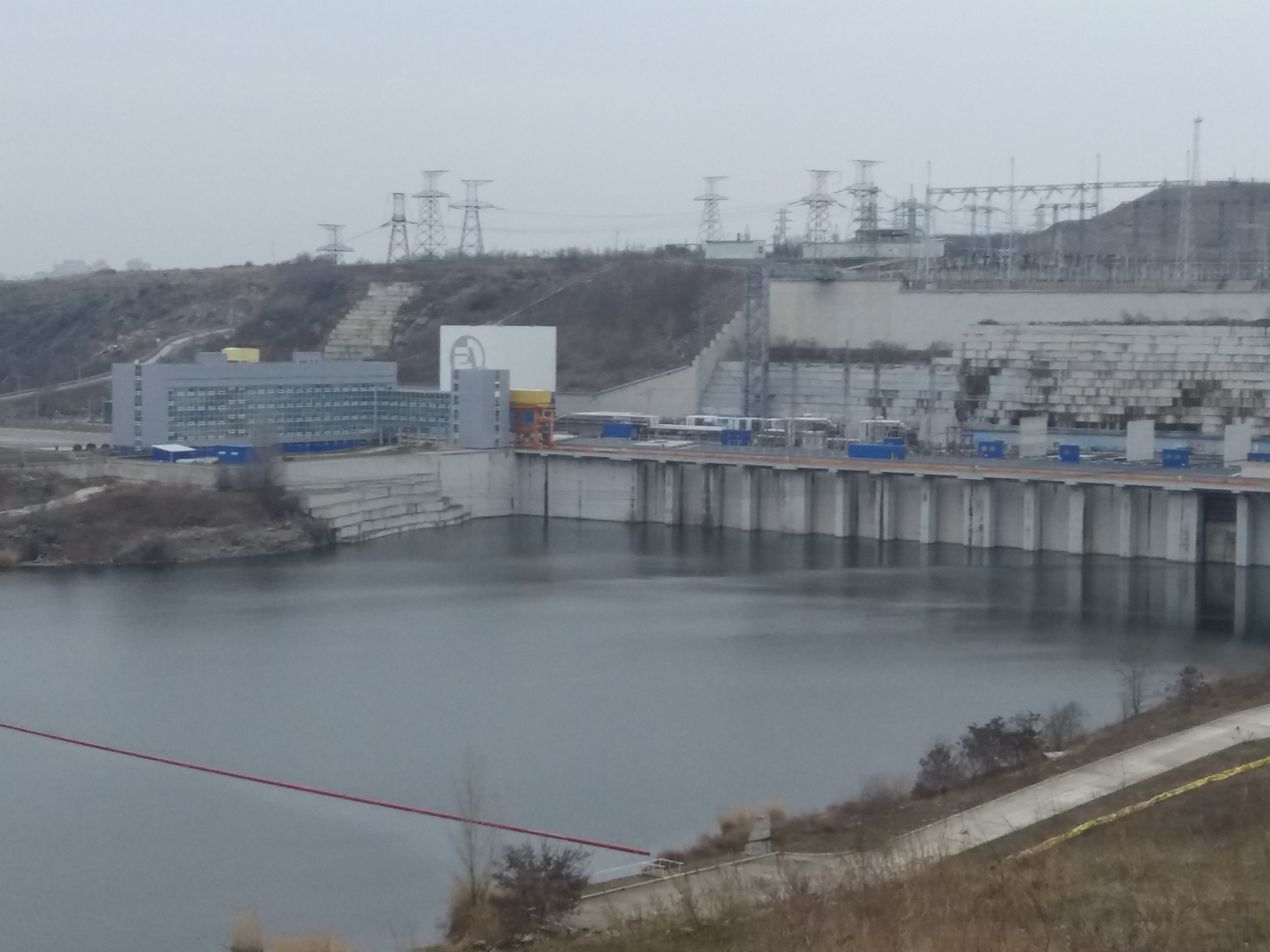
Power station in 2017

Tashlyk Pumped-Storage Power Plant (Ukrainian: Ташлицька гідроакумулювальна електростанція) is a pumped-storage power station near Pivdennoukrainsk in Mykolaiv Oblast, Ukraine. It connects Tashlyk reservoir with Oleksandrivka reservoir on the Southern Bug River.

The Tashlyk Hydraulic Accumulation Station is located west of the district center of Arbuzynka, three kilometers south of Pivdennoukrainsk.

== History ==
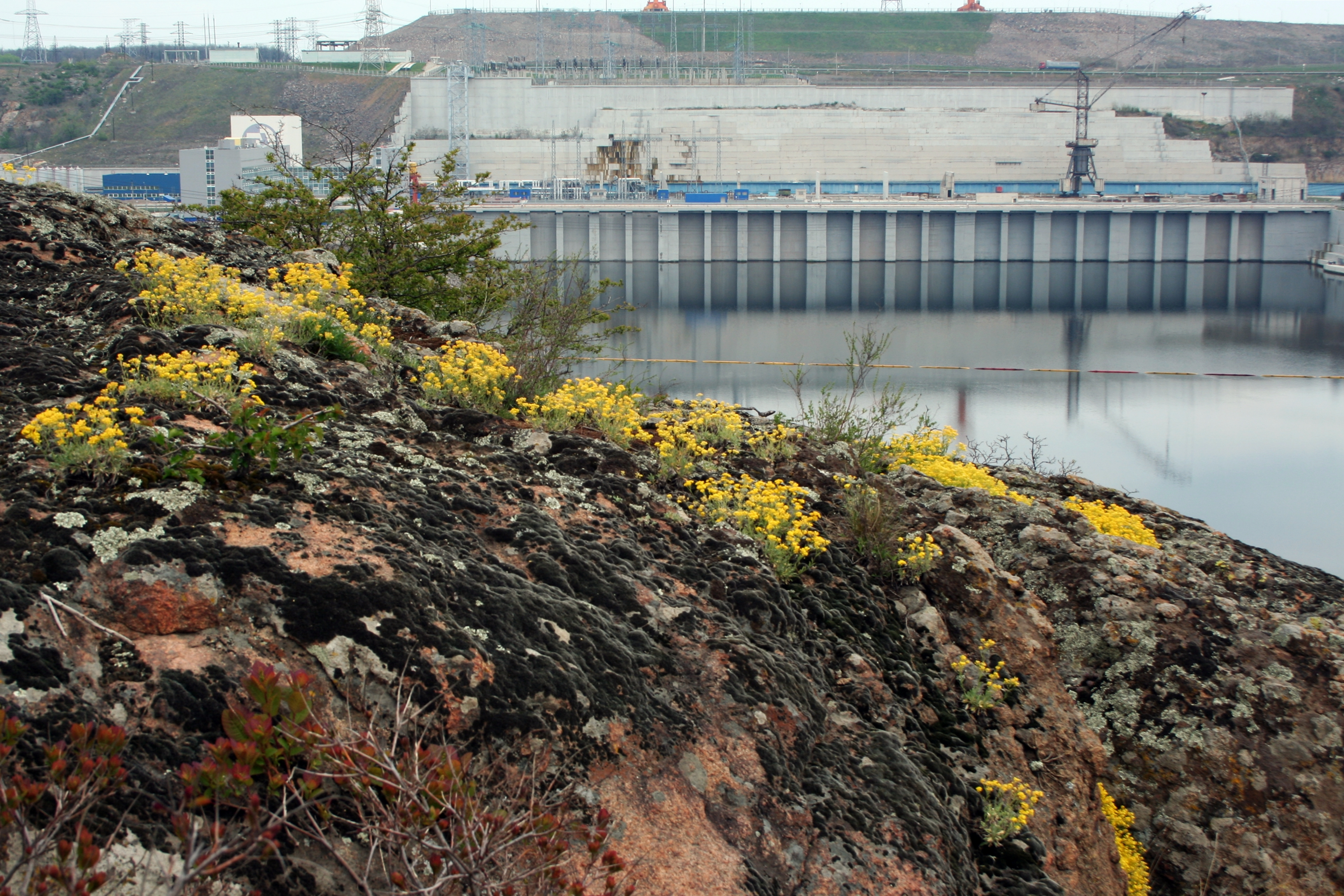
Power station in 2009

Tashlyk Pumped-Storage Power Plant is part of the South-Ukrainian Energy Complex, which includes the South Ukraine Nuclear Power Plant and Oleksandrivka hydroelectric power station. The pumped-storage plant is designed to cover peak loads in the southwestern part of the united power grid of Ukraine, and to provide a reliable baseline regime for the nuclear plant.

Construction of the station began in 1981. In the original plans, the Tashlyk HPSP was to consist of six rotary (generator / engine) units of 150 MW in a turbine mode / 225 in pumping mode and four conventional 250 MW units with a total installed capacity of 6 × 150 + 4 × 250 = 1900 MW (generator mode) / 6 × 225 = 1350 MW (motor mode). In the complex with the HPSS above the channel of the Southern Bug, the Kostiantynivska HPP was to be built, but the project was redeveloped after environmentalists protested.

By the order of the Cabinet of Ministers of July 27, 2006, the project provides only Tashlyk HPSP with installation of six units of 151 / 216.5 MW with a total capacity of 906 MW in turbine mode and 1299 MW in the pump.

The first hydropower unit of Tashlyk HPS was launched on September 14, 2006, in pumping (engine) mode and the gradual filling of the reservoir of the PSP began, and on October 16, 2006, it was started in the generator (turbine) mode. The second hydropower unit of Tashlyk HPS was launched on July 21, 2007, in the generator (turbine) mode, and July 24 in the engine (pumping mode).

The commissioning of the third hydroelectric unit was scheduled for 2011.

On December 13, 2021, the installation and commissioning of the block transformer for the third hydroelectric unit were carried out, and on December 22, the trial launch of the third hydroelectric unit was conducted.

== See also ==
- Hydroelectricity in Ukraine

== Sources ==
- Ташлицькая ГАЕС
- Ташлицькая ГАЕС
- «Енергоатом» за 12 мільйонів проектує добудову Ташлицької ГАЕС, проти якої виступають екологи
- "Гідроенергетики Ташлицької ГАЕС завершили річну ремонтну кампанію на основному обладнанні". uprom.info. National Industrial Portal. 2018-08-13.
- "Фахівціз Китаю ознайомилися з перебігом добудови та роботою Ташлицької ГАЕС". www.energoatom.kiev.ua. Energoatom. 2018-08-31.
