= Yelyzaveta Servatynska =

Ukrainian photojournalist

- Єлизавета Серватинська
- Born: 1997 (age 27–28); Yuzhnoukrainsk, Mykolaiv Oblast, Ukraine

Yelyzaveta Servatynska (Ukrainian: Єлизавета Серватинська, born 1997, in Yuzhnoukrainsk, Mykolaiv Oblast, Ukraine) is a Ukrainian photojournalist.

== Biography ==
She has been taking pictures since her student days.

She graduated from Borys Grinchenko Kyiv Metropolitan University with a degree in journalism.

She worked as a journalist for the Public Studio program on UA: Pershyi (2020), since 2021, she has been a photojournalist for the Suspilne Novyny news website.

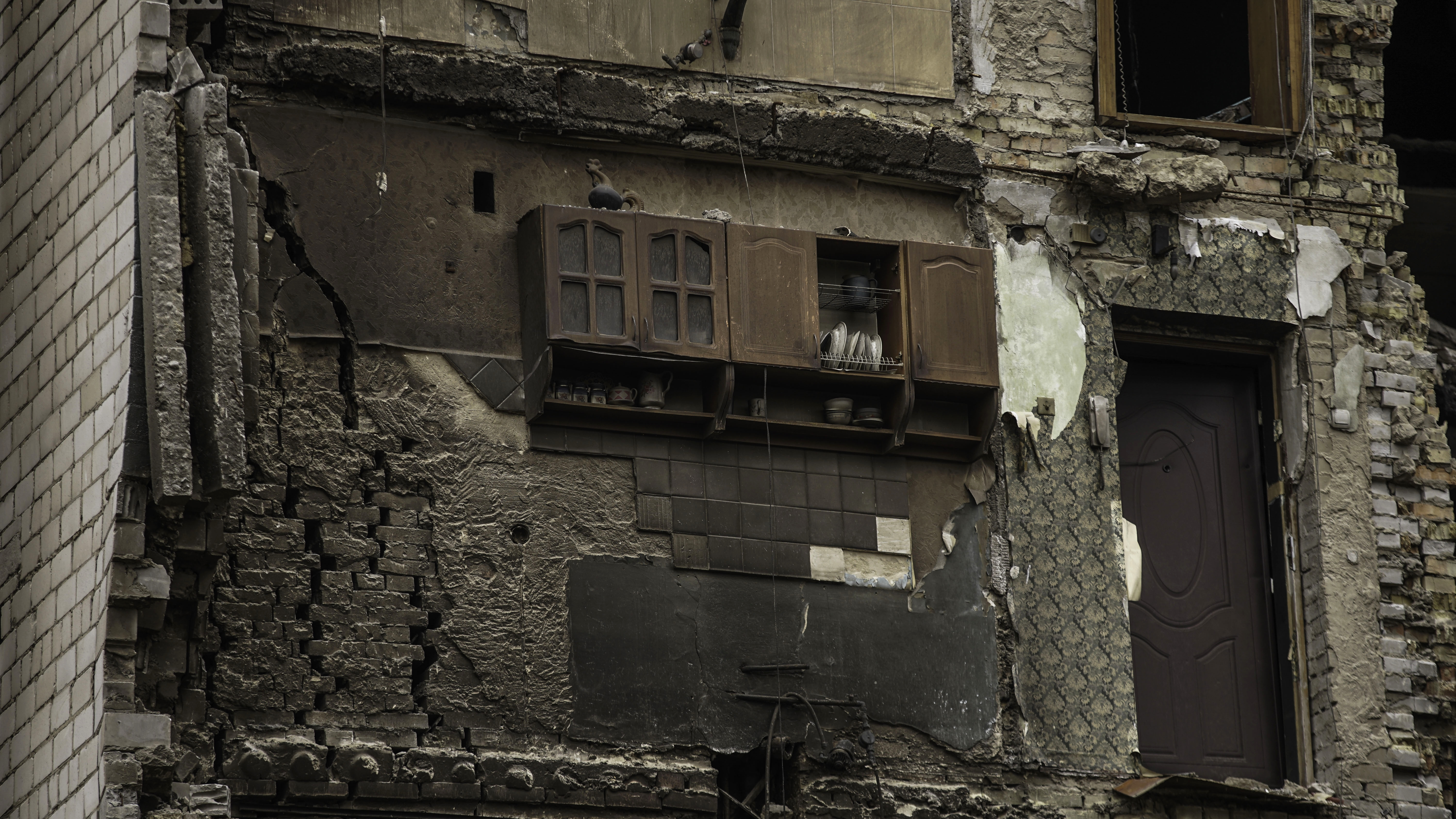
The kitchen cabinet from Borodianka, which became a symbol of the invincibility of the Ukrainian people during the Russian-Ukrainian war, April 6, 2022.

She covers the full-scale Russian invasion of Ukraine in 2022. On April 6, 2022, she visited the liberated Borodianka in the Kyiv region, where she was the first to take a photo of a faith-based locker that was kept on the wall of a destroyed high-rise building. This photo has become a symbol of the invincibility of the Ukrainian people. Ukrainian illustrator Oleksandr Hrekhov used the photo of the locker as the basis for his art, and it was also used by the American magazine Newsweek.

Her work has been published in CNN, Newsweek, Vogue, The Atlantic, and Latin Times.

She is a participant in the collective exhibition War Through the Lens: Photos from Ukraine.
