= Ostap Shypaylo =

Ukrainian politician (born 1989)

- Остап Шипайло
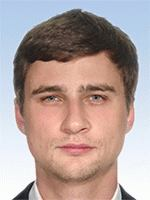

Member of the Verkhovna Rada
- Incumbent
- Assumed office 29 August 2019

Personal details
- Born: Ostap Ihorovych Shapaylo; 7 January 1989 (age 37) Lviv, Ukraine, Soviet Union
- Party: Servant of the People

Ostap Ihorovych Shapaylo (Ukrainian: Остап Ігорович Шипайло; born January 7, 1989, in Lviv) is a Ukrainian lawyer and entrepreneur. People's Deputy of Ukraine of the 9th convocation.

== Biography ==
He graduated from the Faculty of Geography of Ivan Franko Lviv National University (specialty "Management of Organizations"), the Institute of Postgraduate Education and Pre-University Training of Ivan Franko National University of Lviv (specialty "Legal Regulation of Public Administration and Local Self-Government").

Ostap Shipaylo is a director of Karpatbud Development LLC and a subsidiary of Lviv Energy.

He has held senior positions in various companies.

== Political activity ==
Candidate for People's Deputies from the Servant of the People party in the 2019 parliamentary elections, № 120 on the list. At the time of the election: director of Karpatbud Development LLC, non-partisan. Lives in Lviv.

Member of the Verkhovna Rada Committee on Energy and Housing and Communal Services, Chairman of the Subcommittee on Nuclear Energy and Nuclear Safety.
