= South Ukraine Nuclear Power Plant =

Nuclear power plant in Ukraine

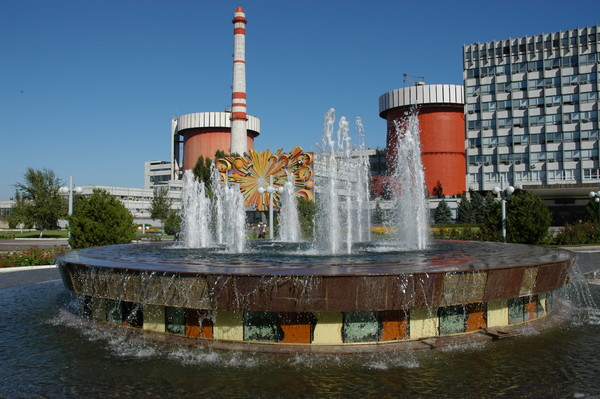
- Official name: Південноукраїнська АЕС
- Country: Ukraine
- Location: Pivdennoukrainsk, Mykolaiv Oblast
- Coordinates: 47°49′0″N 31°13′0″E
- Status: Operational
- Construction began: Unit 1: 1 March 1977; Unit 2: 1 October 1979; Unit 3: 1 February 1985
- Commission date: Unit 1: 18 October 1983; Unit 2: 6 April 1985; Unit 3: 29 December 1989
- Owner: Energoatom
- Operator: Energoatom

Nuclear power station
- Reactor type: PWR
- Reactor supplier: Atomstroyexport
- Cooling source: Tashlytske Reservoir
- Thermal capacity: 3 × 3000 MW_{th}

Power generation
- Units operational: 3 × 950 MW
- Make and model: VVER-1000/302; VVER-1000/338; VVER-1000/320
- Nameplate capacity: 2850 MW
- Capacity factor: 65.56%
- Annual net output: 16,367 GW·h (2016)

External links
- Website: sunpp.mk.ua
- Commons: Related media on Commons

The South Ukraine Nuclear Power Plant (Ukrainian: Південноукраїнська АЕС), also known as the Pivdennoukrainsk Nuclear Power Plant, is a nuclear power plant in Ukraine, near the city of Pivdennoukrainsk in Mykolaiv Oblast, about 350 kilometres (220 mi) south of Kyiv. It is the second largest of the country's five nuclear power stations. It is part of the South Ukrainian Energy Complex, along with the Tashlyk Pumped-Storage Power Plant and Oleksandrivska hydroelectric power station.

It has three VVER-1000 pressurized water reactors and a net generation capacity of 2,850 megawatts (MW). In 2013, following major upgrade work, unit 1 was given a 10-year license extension, which will take it beyond its original 30-year design lifetime. Similar extensions are planned for units 2 and 3, licensed until 2015 and 2019, respectively.

The 750 kV Vetrino–Isaccea–Yuzhnoukrainsk powerline runs from the plant to Isaccea, Romania, but is mostly dismantled or ruined.

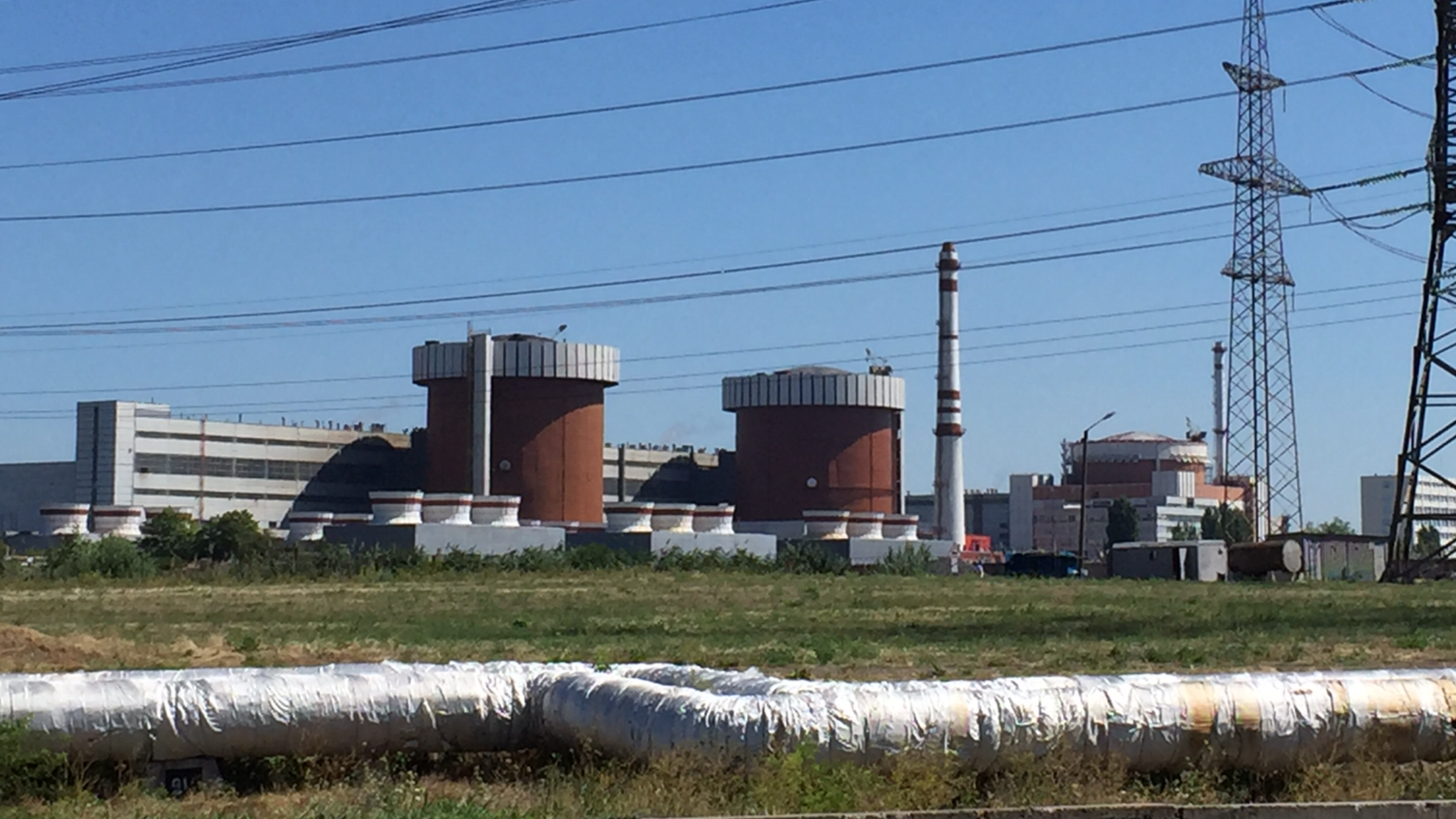
The three reactor buildings and other infrastructure

== History ==
Since 1992, it has been guarded by the 4th NPP Protection Battalion.

The main supplier of fuel for nuclear power plants in Ukraine has been TVEL, with whom NNEGC signed a contract for the supply of nuclear fuel for Ukrainian WMR in 1997 until 2010.

Under a US-Ukrainian initiative to reduce Ukraine's dependency on Russia for fuel, tied to the dismantling of its nuclear weapon arsenal, Energoatom had been using reactor core of unit 3 to test nuclear fuel produced by Westinghouse Electric Company in Västerås in Sweden, mixed with Russian assemblies. In August 2005, it was loaded with the first six experimental fuel assemblies produced by Westinghouse together with Russian fuel for a period of pilot operation. The pilot runs were "deemed unsuccessful, with Energoatom claiming manufacturing defects in the fuel led to a lengthy unscheduled outage at two of the units, while Westinghouse said that errors had been made during fuel loading".

Nevertheless, in 2008, Energoatom signed a fuel supply contract with Westinghouse to supply 630 nuclear fuel assemblies to its three reactors starting in 2011. Westinghouse shipped a reload batch of 42 fuel assemblies for the 3 units in mid-2009 to last for three years of commercial operation. In June 2010, Energoatom signed a long-term fuel supply contract with Russia's TVEL for its nuclear reactor fleet. Earlier, Rosatom had offered a substantial discount to Ukraine if it signed up with TVEL for 20 years. During trial use of Westinghouse manufactured fuel in 2012, the fuel became deformed and caused serious damage to the reactor. On 11 April 2014, after the Russian annexation of Crimea, the fuel contract with Westinghouse was extended through 2020. The fuel will be made at the fuel fabrication facility in Västerås.

Russian rocket strike on 19 September 2022

According to Ukraine, Russian troops were advancing to the plant in the 2022 Russian invasion of Ukraine, but were repelled in the March 2022 Battle of Voznesensk. On 19 September 2022, the power plant was reportedly hit by Russian artillery. A missile exploded about 300 metres from the reactors, blowing out windows in the buildings and damaging a neighbouring hydroelectric power station. Nuclear reactors were not damaged.

On May 8, 2024, preparatory work began at the South Ukraine Nuclear Power Plant for the construction of two new power units, No. 4 and No. 5, using the American AP1000 technology by Westinghouse.

On 4 September 2024, the Director of the Center for Energy Research, Oleksandr Kharchenko, reported that one of the 600 MW power units had reduced output and would soon be under repair. Energoatom stated that the remark would be removed after Ukrenergo NPC specialists restored the damaged lines and ensured a stable electricity supply. The company also emphasized that the event was not related to the repair campaign, but was provoked by Russian shelling of the infrastructure.

On 25 September 2025, the IAEA monitoring team reported the downing and explosion of a drone approximately 800m from the perimeter of the power plant. It was noted that 22 drones were observed near the NPP late in the evening of September 24 and in the morning of September 25, some of which were as close as 500m from the plant. The report also noted that during the inspection also found a crater caused by damaged drones with an area of 4 m^{2} and a depth of about 1 m. The explosions also damaged a regional 150 kV power line not connected to the plant.

== Impact on Chernobyl disaster ==
At around 2pm on 25 April 1986, one of the reactors reportedly scrammed due to an incident. This suddenly took out around 800 MWe out of the grid. This partly led to the grid controller calling for the delay in the rundown of Chernobyl Nuclear Power Plant unit 4 until midnight. This caused the RBMK core of unit 4 to get excessively poisoned with Xenon 135 isotope causing the disaster.

== See also ==
- Nuclear power in Ukraine
- List of power stations in Ukraine
- Power generation in Ukraine
