= Pivdennoukrainsk =

City in Mykolaiv Oblast, Ukraine

Pivdennoukrainsk Південноукраїнськ
- City
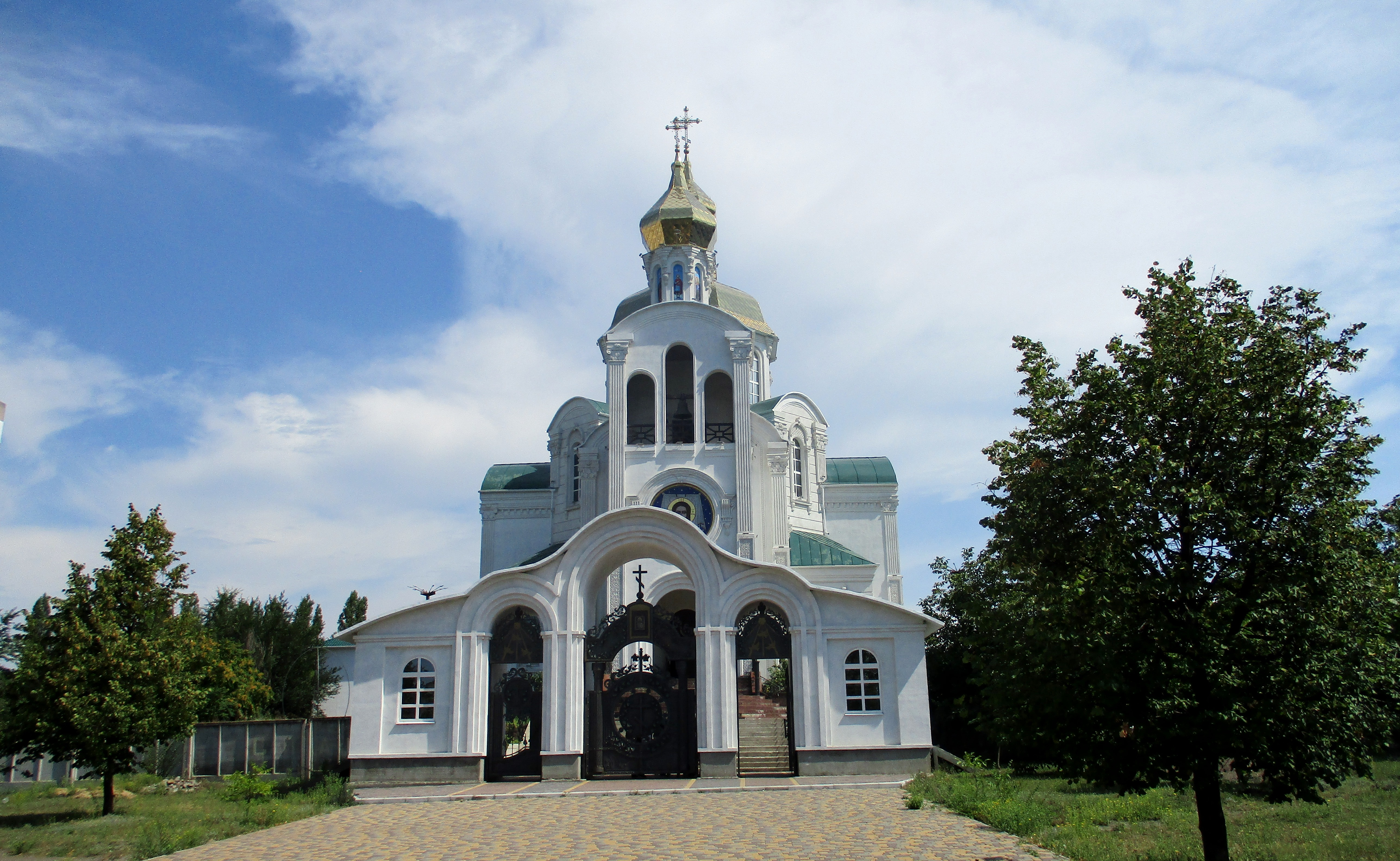
- Cathedral of Christ the Savior

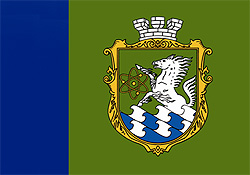
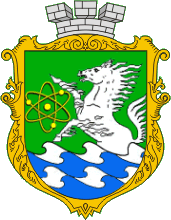
- Flag Coat of arms
- Interactive map of Pivdennoukrainsk
- Location within Ukraine Location within Mykolaiv Oblast
- Coordinates: 47°49′18″N 31°10′30″E
- Country: Ukraine
- Oblast: Mykolaiv Oblast
- Raion: Voznesensk Raion
- Hromada: Pivdennoukrainsk urban hromada
- Founded: 1976
- City rights: 1987

Government
  - Mayor: Yevhen Kvasnevskyj

Area
  - Total: 2,438 km^{2} (941 sq mi)
- Elevation: 82 m (269 ft)

Population (2022)
  - Total: 38,560▼
  - Density: 15.82/km^{2} (40.96/sq mi)
- Postal code: 55000
- Area code: +380-5136
- Website: yu.mk.ua

Pivdennoukrainsk (Ukrainian: Південноукраїнськ), formerly known as Yuzhnoukrainsk (Южноукраїнськ), is a city on the Southern Bug river, in Voznesensk Raion, Mykolaiv Oblast, Ukraine, about 350 kilometers (over 200 miles) south of the capital Kyiv. It hosts the administration of Pivdennoukrainsk urban hromada, one of the hromadas of Ukraine. Population: 38,560 (2022 estimate).

== Etymology ==
In Ukrainian, the word "Південно" means "South".

== History ==
Yuzhnoukrainsk was founded in 1976. It is one of the youngest Ukrainian towns. It received city status and the name Yuzhnoukrainsk on 2 April 1987.

Until 18 July 2020, Yuzhnoukrainsk was incorporated as a city of oblast significance. In July 2020, as part of the administrative reform of Ukraine, which reduced the number of raions of Mykolaiv Oblast to four, the city of Yuzhnoukrainsk was merged into Voznesensk Raion.

In May 2022, as a result of the 2022 Russian invasion of Ukraine, many Ukrainian cities began removing Russian-derived toponymy. After deliberations, the city council of Yuzhnoukrainsk decided that the city's name did not conform to state language standards. This is because the city's name contains the Russian-language prefix yuzhny (южный), which means "south". A natively Ukrainian version of this name would be Pivdennoukrainsk (Південноукраїнськ). In March 2023, the Ukrainian law "On the Condemnation and Prohibition of Propaganda of Russian Imperial Policy in Ukraine and the Decolonization of Toponymy" was passed, which provides for the derussification of Ukrainian toponymy. Among other elements, the law listed Yuzhnoukrainsk as an example of "geographical features with Russified names" that would need to be either brought in line with Ukrainian spelling, or have a historical name returned. On 4 September 2023, voting began on choosing a new name. The naming commission provided three names to choose from: Buhohard (Бугогард), Hard (Гард), and Pivdennoukrainsk (Південноукраїнськ). Pivdennoukrainsk won with 3,071 votes, followed by Hard at 672 votes and Buhohard at 56 votes.

On 9 October 2024, the Verkhovna Rada renamed Yuzhnoukrainsk to Pivdennoukrainsk. Meanwhile, the proposed name Hard did not get enough votes and was rejected.

On 30 December 2025, a farmer destroyed a 150-year-old Jewish cemetery located near the village of Pankratova, within the city of Pivdennoukrainsk in the Mykolaiv Oblast.

== Industry ==
A dam and hydroelectric power station of the Tashlyk Pumped-Storage Power Plant is south of the city.

South Ukraine Nuclear Power Plant, also known as Pivdennoukrainsk Nuclear Power Plant, is on the opposite shore of the hydroelectric reservoir from the city. The power plant has three VVER-1000 reactors and a net capacity of 2,850 megawatts (MW). It is the second largest of the five nuclear power plants in the country. During the 2022 Russian invasion of Ukraine, the nuclear power plant was close to being hit by Russian cruise missiles.

== Demographics ==
As of the 2001 Ukrainian census, Pivdennoukrainsk had a population of 39,460 people. The ethnic and linguistic composition was as follows:

Ethnic composition of Pivdennoukrainsk
	percent
Ukrainians	73.86%
Russians	21.67%
Moldovans	0.68%
Belarusians	0.66%
Bulgarians	0.28%
Armenians	0.23%
Tatars	0.22%
Poles	0.14%
Azerbaijanis	0.07%
Jews	0.05%

First languages (2001)
	percent
Ukrainian	66.5%
Russian	31.4%
Moldovan	0.2%
Belarusian	0.1%
Bulgarian	0.1%
others	0.2%

== Notable people ==
Born

- Anastasia Kozhevnikova (born 1993) is a Ukrainian singer and former member of the girl group Nu Virgos.
- Yelyzaveta Servatynska (born 1997) is a Ukrainian photojournalist.
- Vadym Sapay (born 1986) is a Ukrainian football player.

== Gallery ==
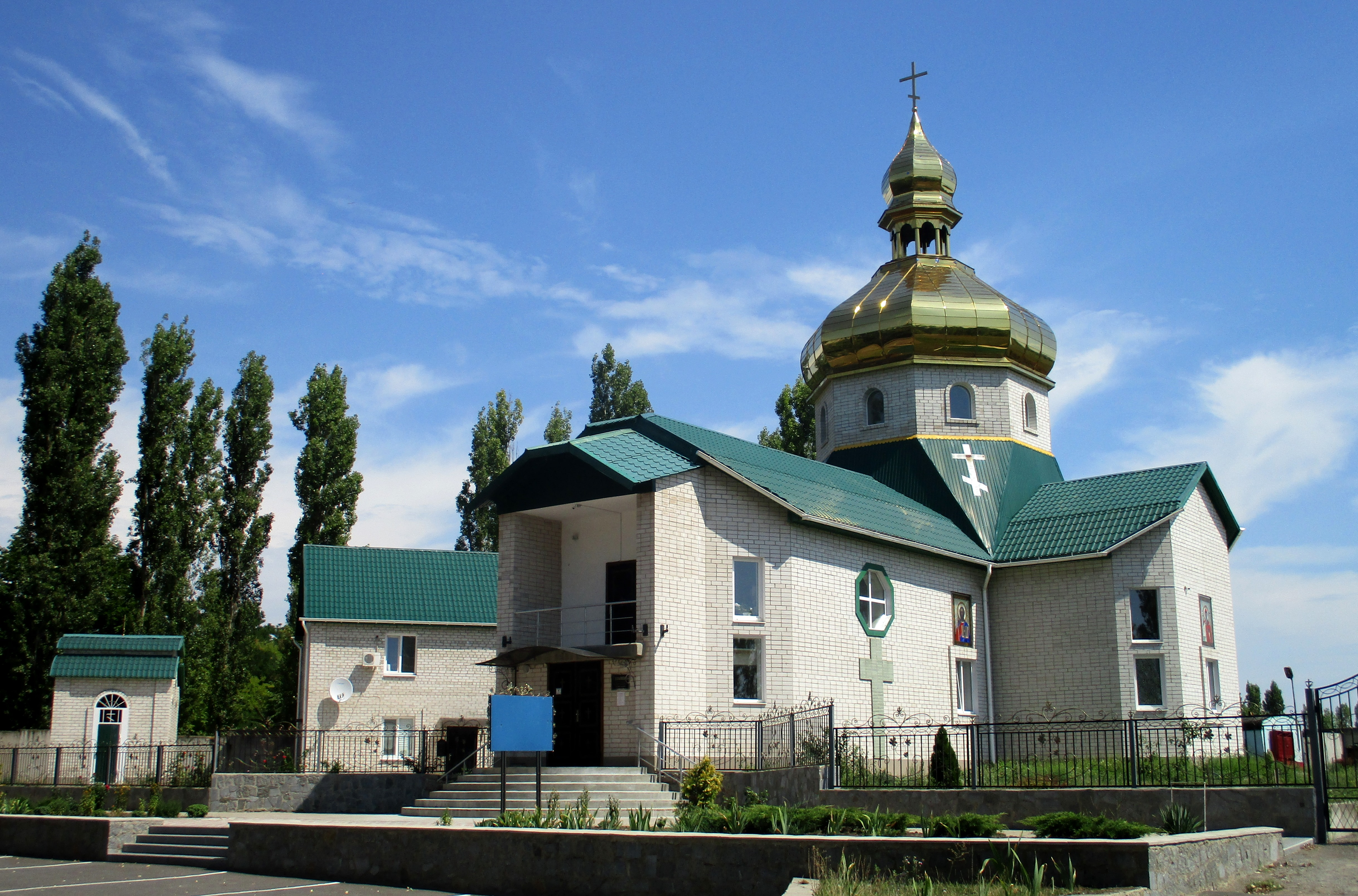
Sts. Peter and Paul church

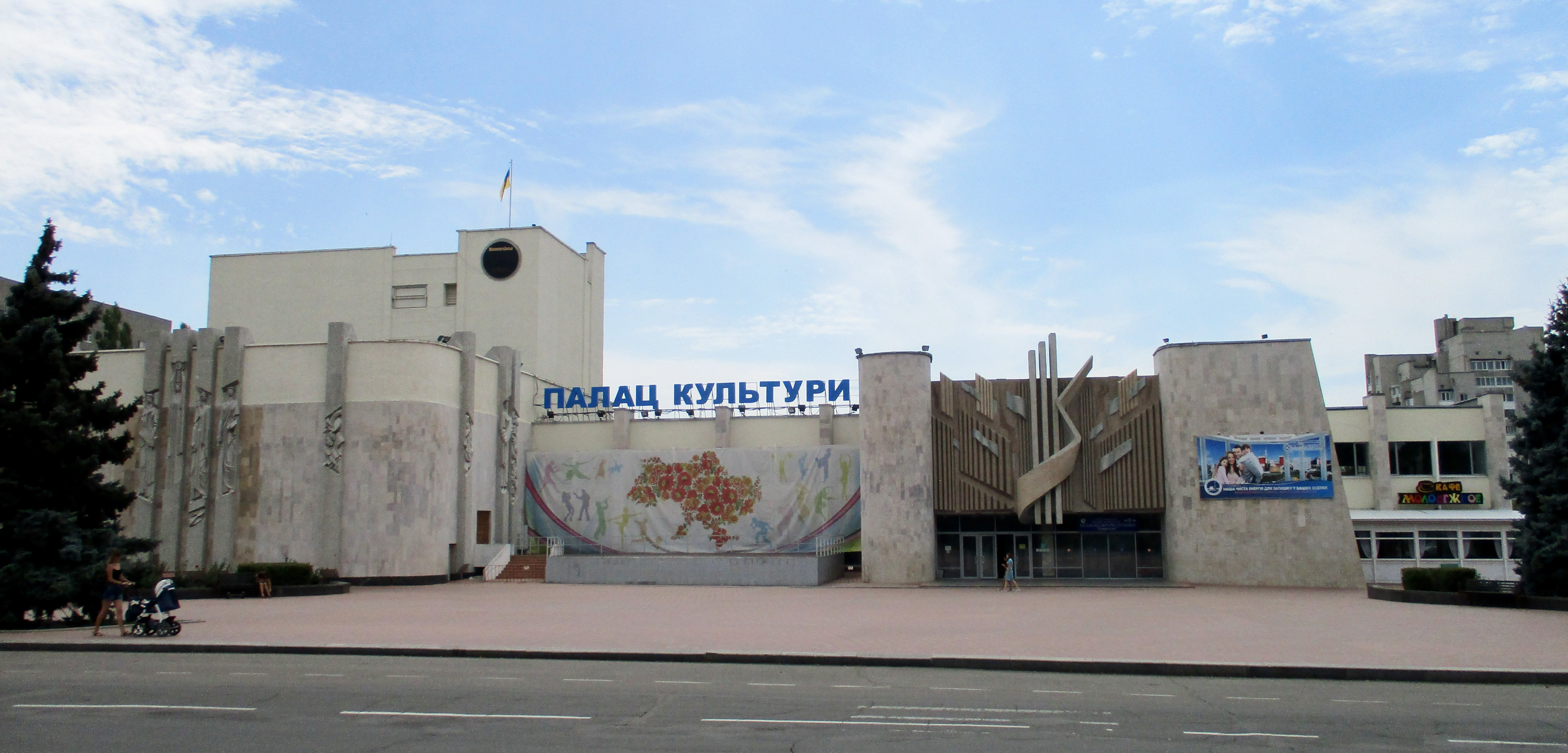
Palace of Culture

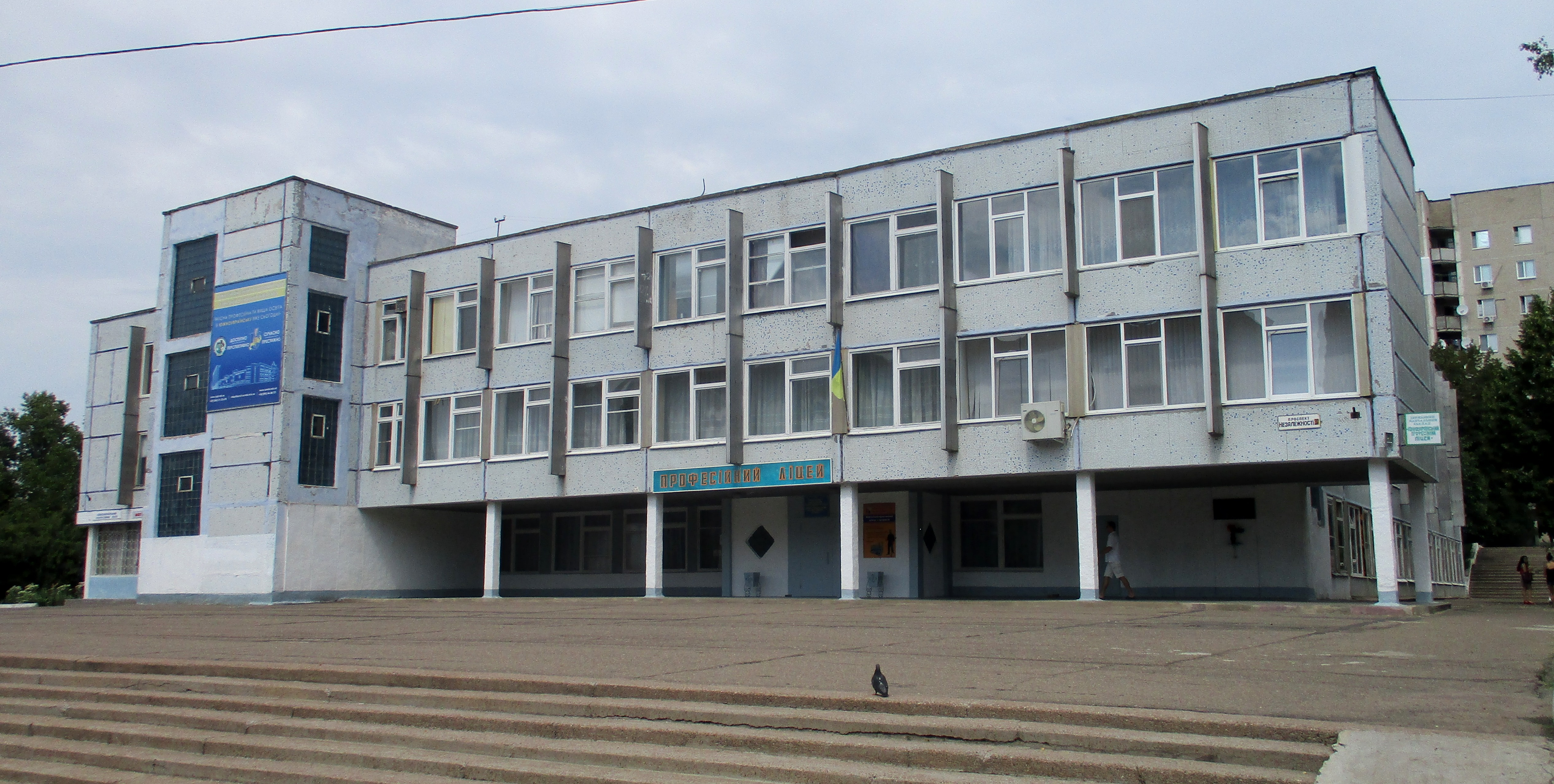
Professional Lyceum

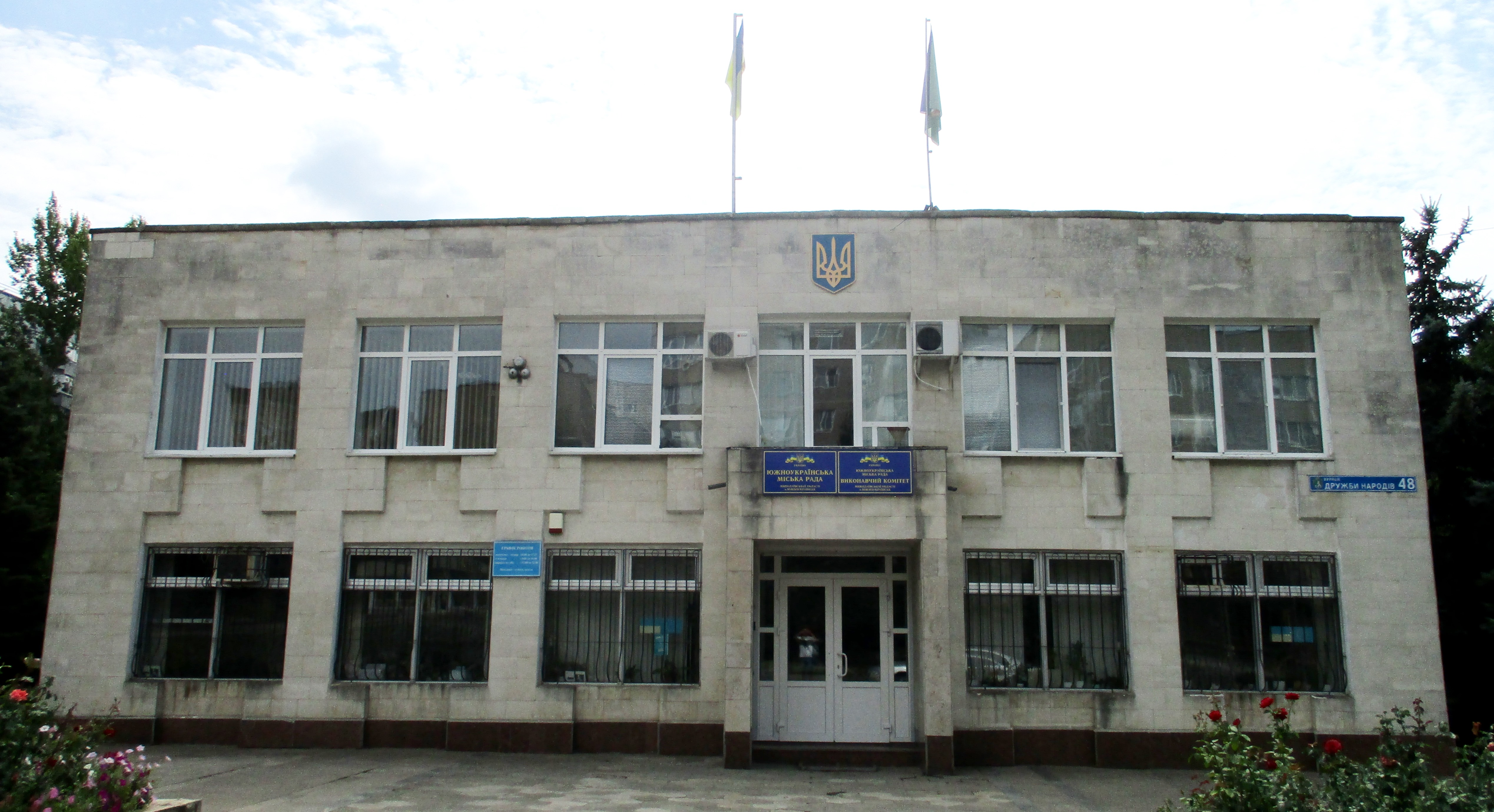
Pivdennoukrainsk City Council

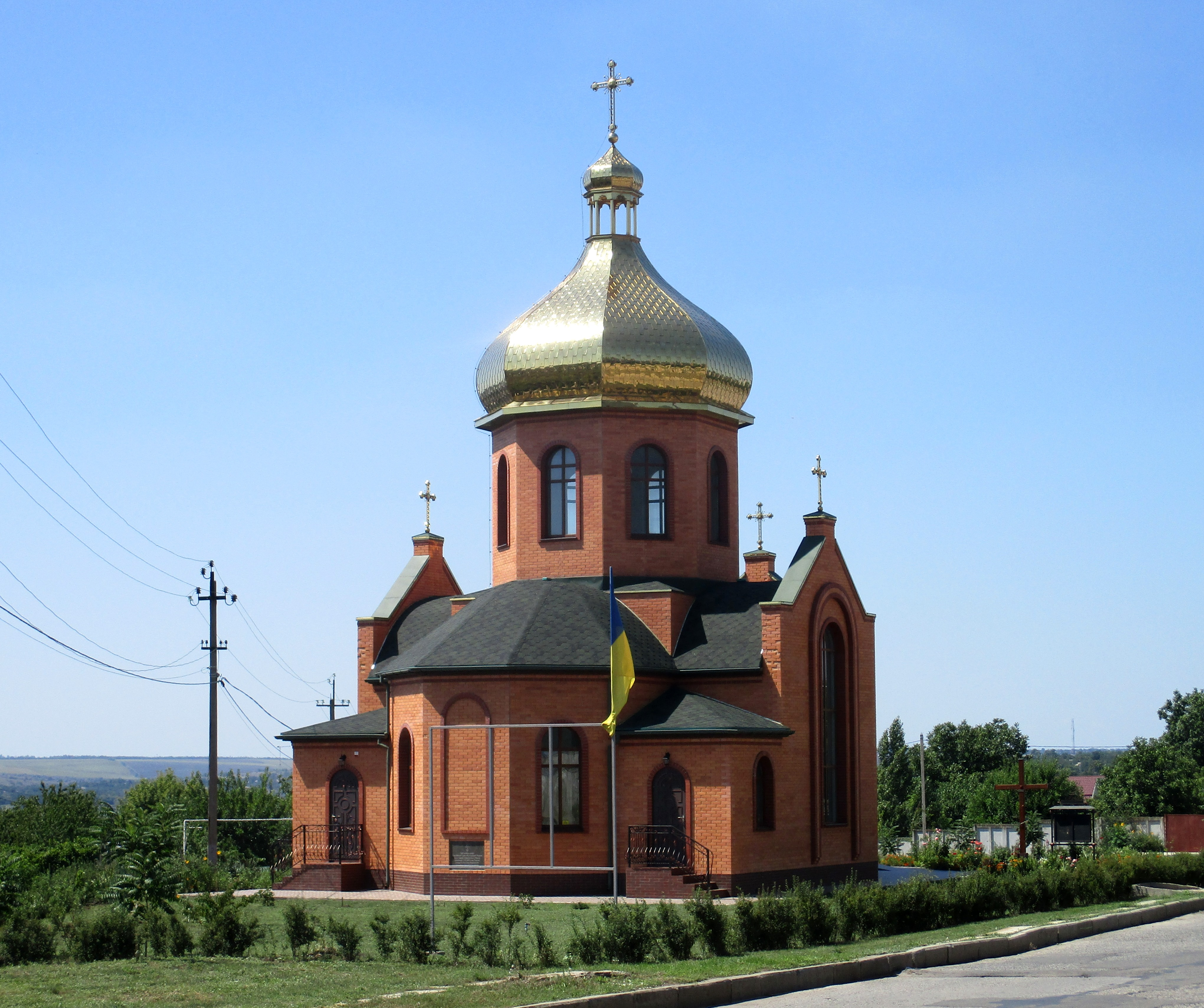
Church of All Saints of the Ukrainian people
