= Orbita (disambiguation) =

Orbita is the cavity or socket/hole of the skull in which the eye and its appendages are situated.

Orbita may also refer to:

- Orbita (TV system), a Soviet-Russian system of broadcasting and delivering TV signals via satellites.
- Orbita, Ávila, a municipality located in the province of Ávila, Castile and León, Spain.
- Orbita, Cherkasy Oblast, closed city in Ukraine
- Orbita (collective), a Latvian art collective.
