= Nuclear power in the Soviet Union =

At its peak in 1982, nuclear power in the Soviet Union accounted for 6.5% of total electricity consumption and the total nuclear capacity installed was 18 GW. However, nuclear power within the Soviet Union declined severely as a result of the 1986 Chernobyl Disaster.

== History ==
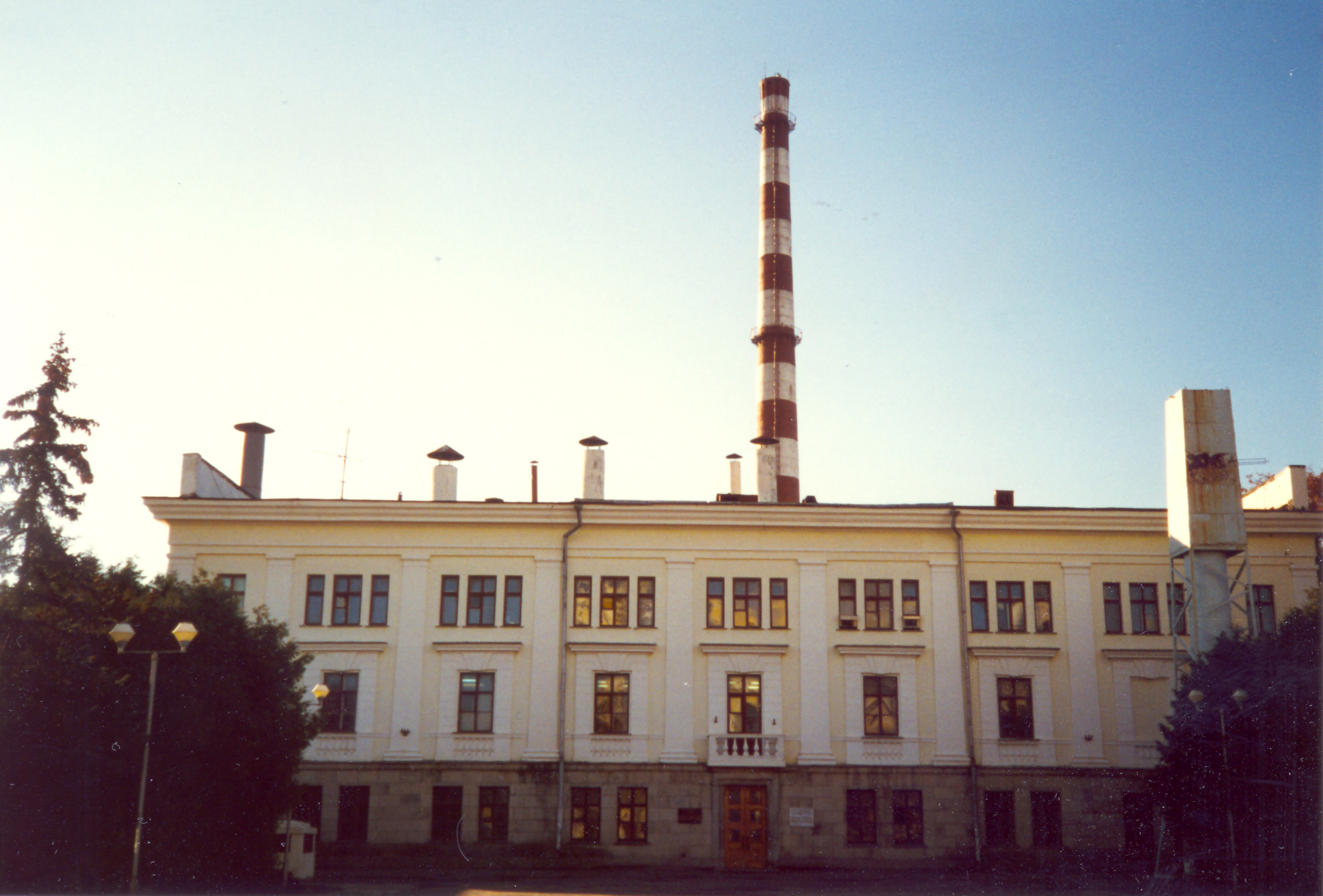
The Obninsk Nuclear Power Plant in 2008.

The first nuclear power plant constructed in the Soviet Union was the Obninsk Nuclear Power Plant, built near Moscow on June 26, 1954. It was intended as an experiment to determine the capabilities of nuclear power in supplying a commercial grid. At the beginning of its operation, it produced 5 MWe. The power plant proved successful in its experiment and four years later, the Siberian Nuclear Power Station with a 100 MWe capacity was installed and subsequently increased to 600 MWe. Following the development, commercial power stations were constructed in Beloyarsk, Novo-Voronezh, Kola, Leningrad, and Armenia.

In the year 1960, the Soviet Union had a nuclear power capacity of 605 MWe. By 1975, this capacity was increased to 4.7 GW. At this point, the Soviet Union was committed to developing an aggressive nuclear power program. Throughout the 1970s, approximately 10% of electricity powering the Soviet Union came from Nuclear Power Plants and predictions made by Deputy Minister of Power Energy aimed an increase by approximately 400-500% by the year 2000.

All Soviet power reactors were designed by the Ministry of Medium Machine Building (Sredmash), the key Soviet ministry for administering the Soviet nuclear weapons complex from 1953 until 1989 (when it was reorganized into the Ministry of Atomic Energy and Industry of the USSR). The reactors were ordered and administered, however by the Ministry of Energy and Electrification (Minenergo), which was in charge of power production and plant operation. The differences in institutional culture, priorities, and expertise between these two industries have been argued to be core to understanding the choices made by the Soviet Union in the field of nuclear power, notably in its embrace of the controversial RBMK reactor design, which was developed with a priority on ease of local construction, economical value, and the possibility (never implemented) for dual-use plutonium production — with core safety concerns being either de-prioritized or kept secret.

=== Chernobyl accident of April 26, 1986 ===
On April 26, 1986, an uncontrolled power increase occurred within the core of Reactor No. 4 at the Chernobyl Nuclear Power Plant causing an explosion within the core that destroyed the reactor itself, and vented radioactive materials into the atmosphere and surrounding environment, causing dozens of immediate deaths related to the containment of the accident, and potentially tens of thousands of later deaths from cancer. The Chernobyl disaster is one of two disasters ranked as a Level 7 on the International Nuclear Event Scale for the spread of radioactive material and environmental effects, and there are significant areas of Ukraine and Belarus that are still considered contaminated by the accident.

Following the 1986 accident, stances on nuclear power changed, especially so in the USSR. The incident highlighted the threat of the country's 24 RBMK reactors, which were found to have been created with major operational flaws that cause uncontrollable spikes in energy during a reactor's emergency shutdown procedure. These required re-design or replacement to meet safety standards for operation.

The event slowed the nuclear energy program of the Soviet Union, which would not see reinvigoration until after the collapse of the Soviet Union in 1991.

== List of reactors for electricity production ==
Name	Location	SSR	Unit	Type	Gross Capacity (MWe)	Operational	Status	Notes
Armenian	Yerevan	Armenian	1	VVER	408	1976-1988	Closed	Shutdown after the Spitak Earthquake and Chernobyl accident
Armenian	Yerevan	Armenian	2	VVER	440	1980-1988, 1995–	Operational	Shutdown after the Spitak Earthquake and Chernobyl accident, restarted in 1995. Shutdown expected 2036
Balakovo	Balakovo	Russian	1	VVER	1000	1986–	Operational	
Balakovo	Balakovo	Russian	2	VVER	1000	1988–	Operational	
Balakovo	Balakovo	Russian	3	VVER	1000	1989–	Operational	
Balakovo	Balakovo	Russian	4	VVER	1000	1993–	Operational	
Balakovo	Balakovo	Russian	5	VVER	1000	Planned 1970s	Cancelled	
Balakovo	Balakovo	Russian	6	VVER	1000	Planned 1970s	Cancelled	
Beloyarsk	Zarechny, Sverdlovsk Oblast	Russian	1	AMB-100	108	1964-1983	Closed	
Beloyarsk	Zarechny, Sverdlovsk Oblast	Russian	2	AMB-200	160	1967-1990	Closed	
Beloyarsk	Zarechny, Sverdlovsk Oblast	Russian	3	BN-600	600	1980-	Operational	
Beloyarsk	Zarechny, Sverdlovsk Oblast	Russian	4	BN-800	885	2016-	Operational	
Chernobyl	Chernobyl	Ukrainian	1	RBMK	1000	1977-1995	Closed	Shutdown as a result of the Chernobyl Disaster
Chernobyl	Chernobyl	Ukrainian	2	RBMK	1000	1978-1991	Closed	Shutdown as a result of fire damage in turbines
Chernobyl	Chernobyl	Ukrainian	3	RBMK	1000	1981-2000	Closed	Shutdown as a result of the Chernobyl Disaster
Chernobyl	Chernobyl	Ukrainian	4	RBMK	1000	1983-1986	Destroyed	Catastrophic meltdown and explosion — the reactor of the Chernobyl Disaster
Chernobyl	Chernobyl	Ukrainian	5	RBMK	1000	Planned 1986	Cancelled	Postponed to 1989, then cancelled by Chernobyl Disaster
Chernobyl	Chernobyl	Ukrainian	6	RBMK	1000	Planned 1988	Cancelled	Postponed to 1989, then cancelled by Chernobyl Disaster
Ignalina	Visaginas	Lithuanian	1	RBMK-1500	1360	1983-2004	Closed	Initially operated at 1500 MW, de-rated to 1360 after the Chernobyl accident.
Ignalina	Visaginas	Lithuanian	2	RBMK-1500	1360	1987-2009	Closed	Meant to come online in 1986, postponed for a year after the Chernobyl accident.
Ignalina	Visaginas	Lithuanian	3	RBMK-1500	1500	Planned 1991	Cancelled	Construction cancelled in 1989
Ignalina	Visaginas	Lithuanian	4	RBMK-1500	1500	Planned 1990s	Cancelled	Construction cancelled in 1989
Kalinin	Udomlya	Russian	1	VVER	1000	1985-	Operational	Shutdown expected 2044
Kalinin	Udomlya	Russian	2	VVER	1000	1987-	Operational	Shutdown expected 2038
Kalinin	Udomlya	Russian	3	VVER	1000	2005-	Operational	
Kalinin	Udomlya	Russian	4	VVER	1000	2012-	Operational	
Khmelnytskyi	Netishyn	Ukrainian	1	VVER	1000	1988-	Operational	
Khmelnytskyi	Netishyn	Ukrainian	2	VVER	1000	2005-	Operational	
Khmelnytskyi	Netishyn	Ukrainian	3	VVER	1000	Est. 2027	Under Construction	Construction stopped in 1980s, restarted in 2018
Khmelnytskyi	Netishyn	Ukrainian	4	VVER	1000	Est. 2028	Under Construction	Construction stopped in 1980s, restarted in 2018
Kola	Polyarnye Zori	Russian	1	VVER	440	1973-	Operational	Shutdown expected 2033
Kola	Polyarnye Zori	Russian	2	VVER	440	1975-	Operational	Shutdown expected 2035
Kola	Polyarnye Zori	Russian	3	VVER	440	1982-	Operational	Shutdown expected 2042
Kola	Polyarnye Zori	Russian	4	VVER	440	1984-	Operational	Shutdown expected 2044
Kursk	Kursk	Russian	1	RBMK	1000	1977-2021	Closed	
Kursk	Kursk	Russian	2	RBMK	1000	1979-2024	Closed	
Kursk	Kursk	Russian	3	RBMK	1000	1983-	Operational	Shutdown expected 2033 Originally expected in 2028, but prolonged by more 5 years
Kursk	Kursk	Russian	4	RBMK	1000	1985-	Operational	Shutdown expected in 2035 Originally expected in 2030, but prolonged by more 5 year
Kursk	Kursk	Russian	5	RBMK	1000	Planned 1991	Cancelled	Construction cancelled in 2012, nearly 100% complete
Kursk	Kursk	Russian	6	RBMK	1000	Planned 1992	Cancelled	Construction cancelled in 1993
Leningrad	Sosnovy Bor	Russian	1	RBMK	1000	1974-2018	Closed	
Leningrad	Sosnovy Bor	Russian	2	RBMK	1000	1976-2020	Closed	
Leningrad	Sosnovy Bor	Russian	3	RBMK	1000	1980-	Operational	Shutdown expected 2030 (Extended by 5 years in 2025)
Leningrad	Sosnovy Bor	Russian	4	RBMK	1000	1981-	Operational	Shutdown expected 2031(Extended by 5 years in 2026)
Mangyshlak	Aktau	Kazakh	1	BN-350	350	1973-1999	Closed	
Novovoronezh	Novovoronezh	Russian	1	VVER	210	1964-1988	Closed	
Novovoronezh	Novovoronezh	Russian	2	VVER	365	1970-1990	Closed	
Novovoronezh	Novovoronezh	Russian	3	VVER	417	1972-2016	Closed	
Novovoronezh	Novovoronezh	Russian	4	VVER	417	1973-	Operational	Shutdown expected 2032
Novovoronezh	Novovoronezh	Russian	5	VVER	950	1981-	Operational	Shutdown expected 2035
Obninsk	Obninsk	Russian	1	AM-1	5	1954-2002	Closed	World's first nuclear power plant
Rivne	Varash	Ukrainian	1	VVER	440	1981-	Operational	Shutdown expected in 2041
Rivne	Varash	Ukrainian	2	VVER	440	1982-	Operational	Shutdown expected in 2042
Rivne	Varash	Ukrainian	3	VVER	1000	1987-	Operational	Shutdown expected in 2041
Rivne	Varash	Ukrainian	4	VVER	1000	2004-	Operational	Shutdown expected in 2064
Smolensk	Smolensk	Russian	1	RBMK	1000	1983-	Operational	Shutdown expected 2027
Smolensk	Smolensk	Russian	2	RBMK	1000	1985-	Operational	Shutdown expected 2030
Smolensk	Smolensk	Russian	3	RBMK	1000	1990-	Operational	Shutdown expected 2034
Smolensk	Smolensk	Russian	4	RBMK	1000	Planned ~1994	Cancelled	Construction cancelled 1993
South Ukraine	Yuzhnoukrainsk	Ukrainian	1	VVER	1000	1983-	Operational	Shutdown expected in 2043
South Ukraine	Yuzhnoukrainsk	Ukrainian	2	VVER	1000	1985-	Operational	Shutdown expected in 2045
South Ukraine	Yuzhnoukrainsk	Ukrainian	3	VVER	1000	1989-	Operational	Shutdown expected in 2049
South Ukraine	Yuzhnoukrainsk	Ukrainian	4	VVER	1000	Planned 1991	Cancelled	Construction halted in 1989 - cooling capability problem
Zaporizhzhia	Enerhodar	Ukrainian	1	VVER	1000	1985-	Operations Suspended	Controlled by Russia since 2022
Zaporizhzhia	Enerhodar	Ukrainian	2	VVER	1000	1986-	Operations Suspended	Controlled by Russia since 2022
Zaporizhzhia	Enerhodar	Ukrainian	3	VVER	1000	1987-	Operations Suspended	Controlled by Russia since 2022
Zaporizhzhia	Enerhodar	Ukrainian	4	VVER	1000	1988-	Operations Suspended	Controlled by Russia since 2022
Zaporizhzhia	Enerhodar	Ukrainian	5	VVER	1000	1989-	Operations Suspended	Controlled by Russia since 2022
Zaporizhzhia	Enerhodar	Ukrainian	6	VVER	1000	1996-	Operations Suspended	Controlled by Russia since 2022

=== Unfinished reactors ===
- Russian: Baskhkir, Gorky, Kostroma, South Ural, Voronezh, Tatar
- Ukrainian: Chyhyryn, Crimean, Kharkiv, Odesa
- Belarusian: Minsk

== See also ==
- Energy policy of the Soviet Union
- Uncompleted Soviet nuclear plants
- Nuclear energy in Armenia
- Belarusian nuclear power plant
- Nuclear energy in Kazakhstan
- Nuclear energy in Lithuania
- Nuclear power in Russia
- Nuclear power in Ukraine
