= Nuclear power in Ukraine =

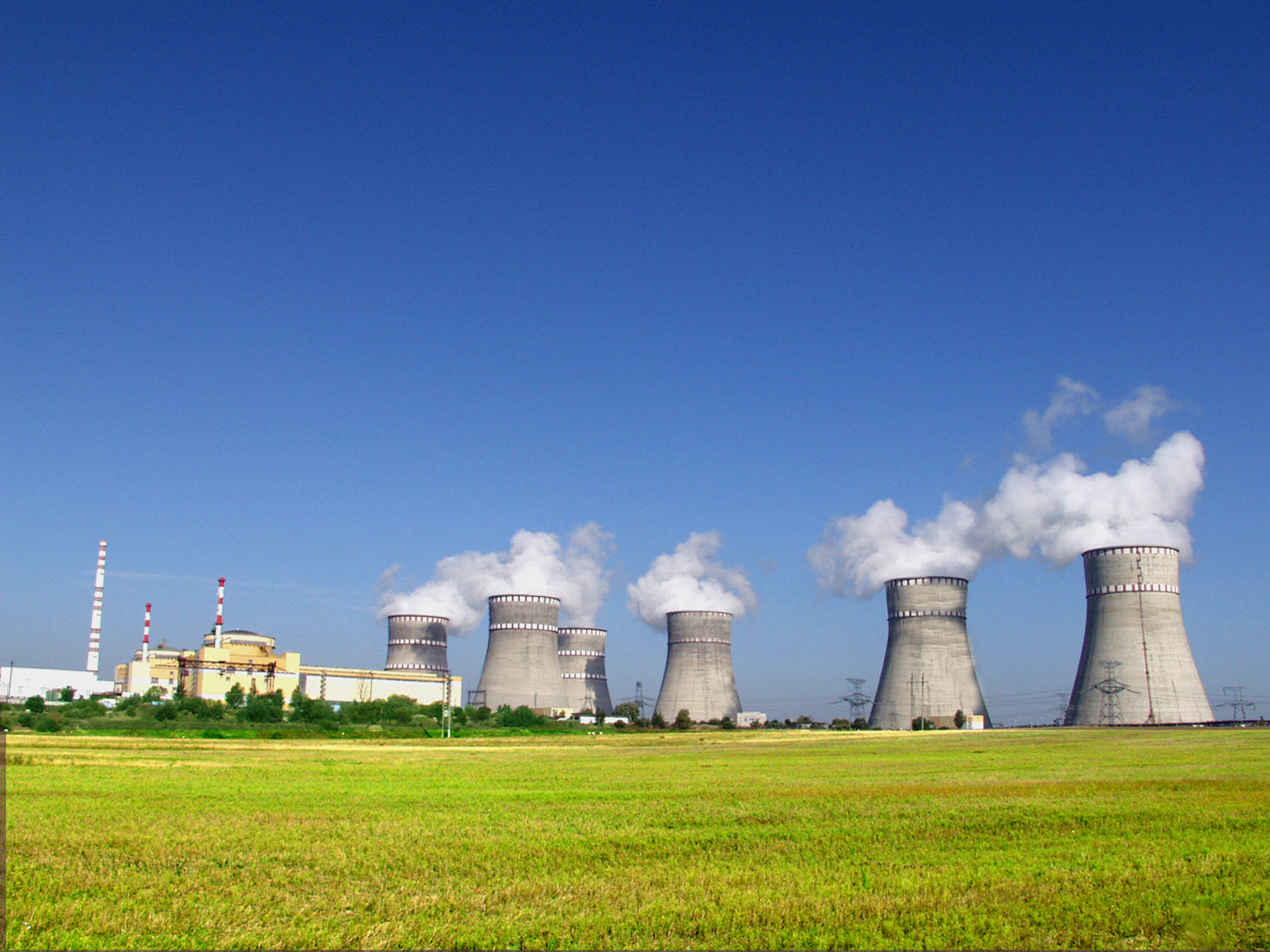
Rivne Nuclear Power Plant

There are four nuclear power plants in Ukraine but one of them, Zaporizhzhia, is now occupied and claimed by Russia and shutdown. The 15 reactors total installed capacity is over 13 GWe. Energoatom, a Ukrainian state enterprise, is the operator. Ukraine is one of the very few countries where nuclear power supplies most of its electricity.

Zaporizhzhia is the largest nuclear power plant in Europe, and Russia wants Rosatom to restart it.

The 1986 Chernobyl disaster in northern Ukraine was the world's most severe nuclear accident to date. It occurred at the Chernobyl Nuclear Power Plant on the banks of the Dnieper.

Lack of coal for Ukraine's coal-fired power stations due to the war in Donbas and a shut down of one of the six reactors of the Zaporizhzhia Nuclear Power Plant led to rolling blackouts throughout the country in December 2014. Due to the Russo-Ukrainian War, the nuclear power plant has been damaged.

Electricity production by source, Ukraine

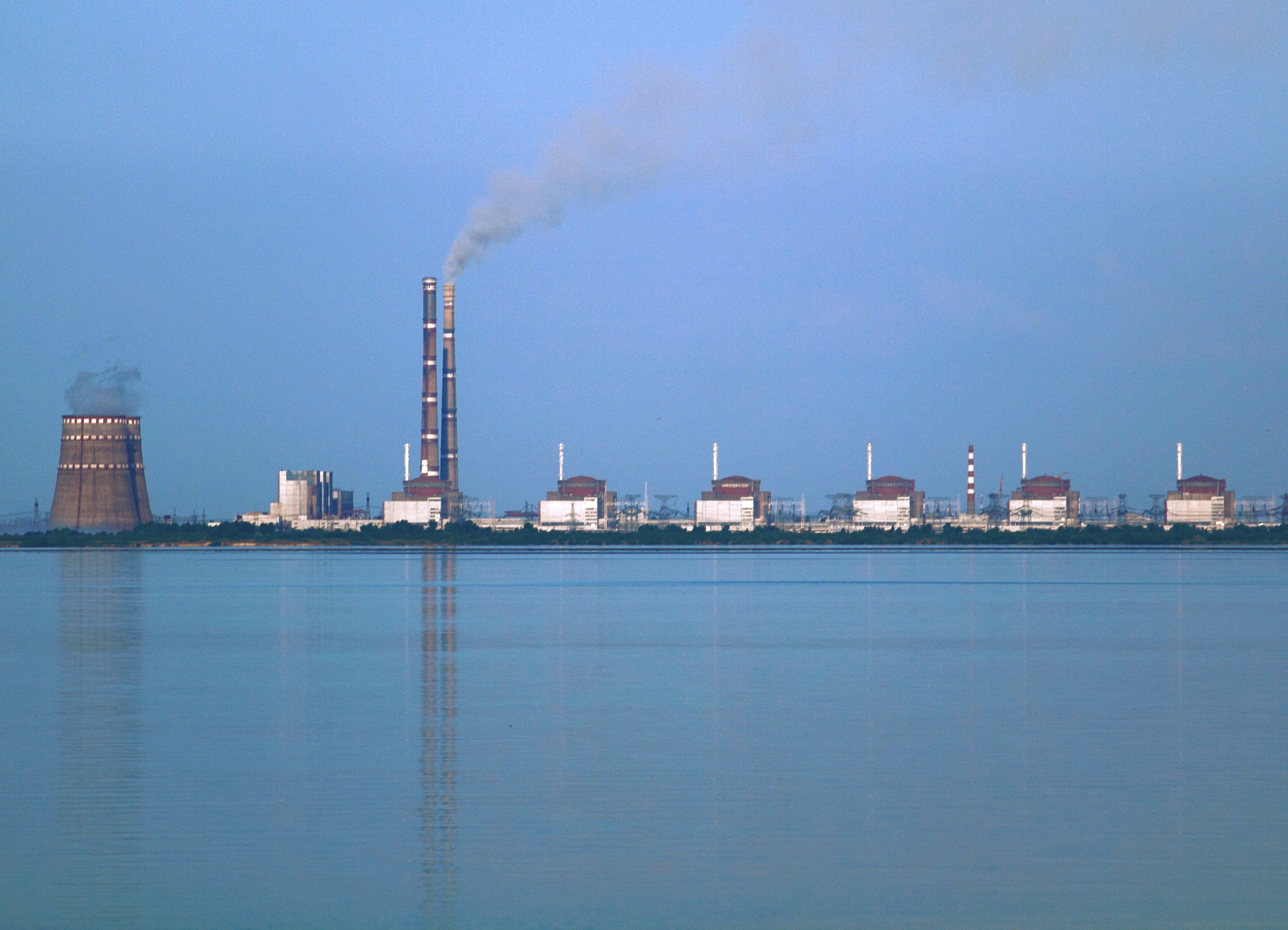
Zaporizhzhia Nuclear Power Plant is Europe's largest with six reactors whose total capacity is 6 GW.

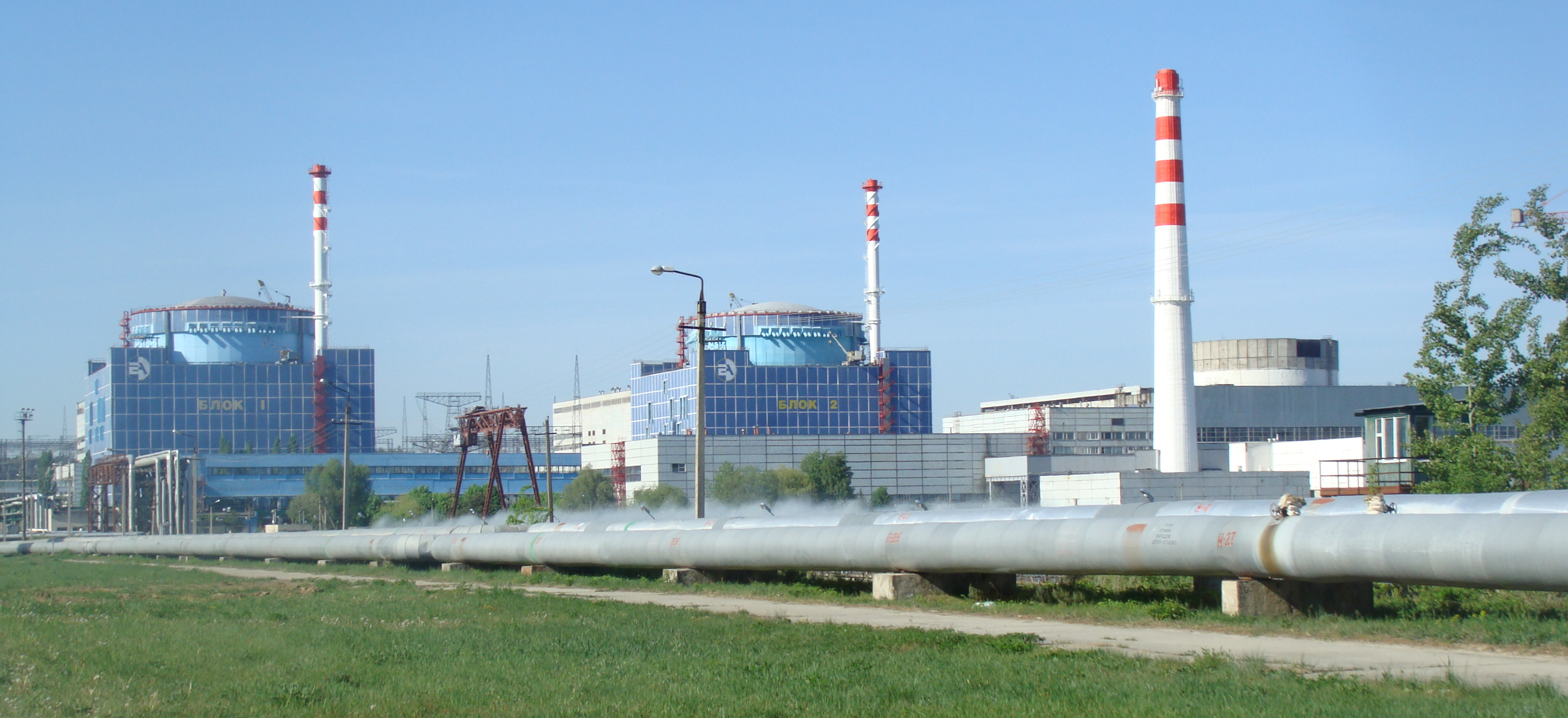
Khmelnytskyi NPP

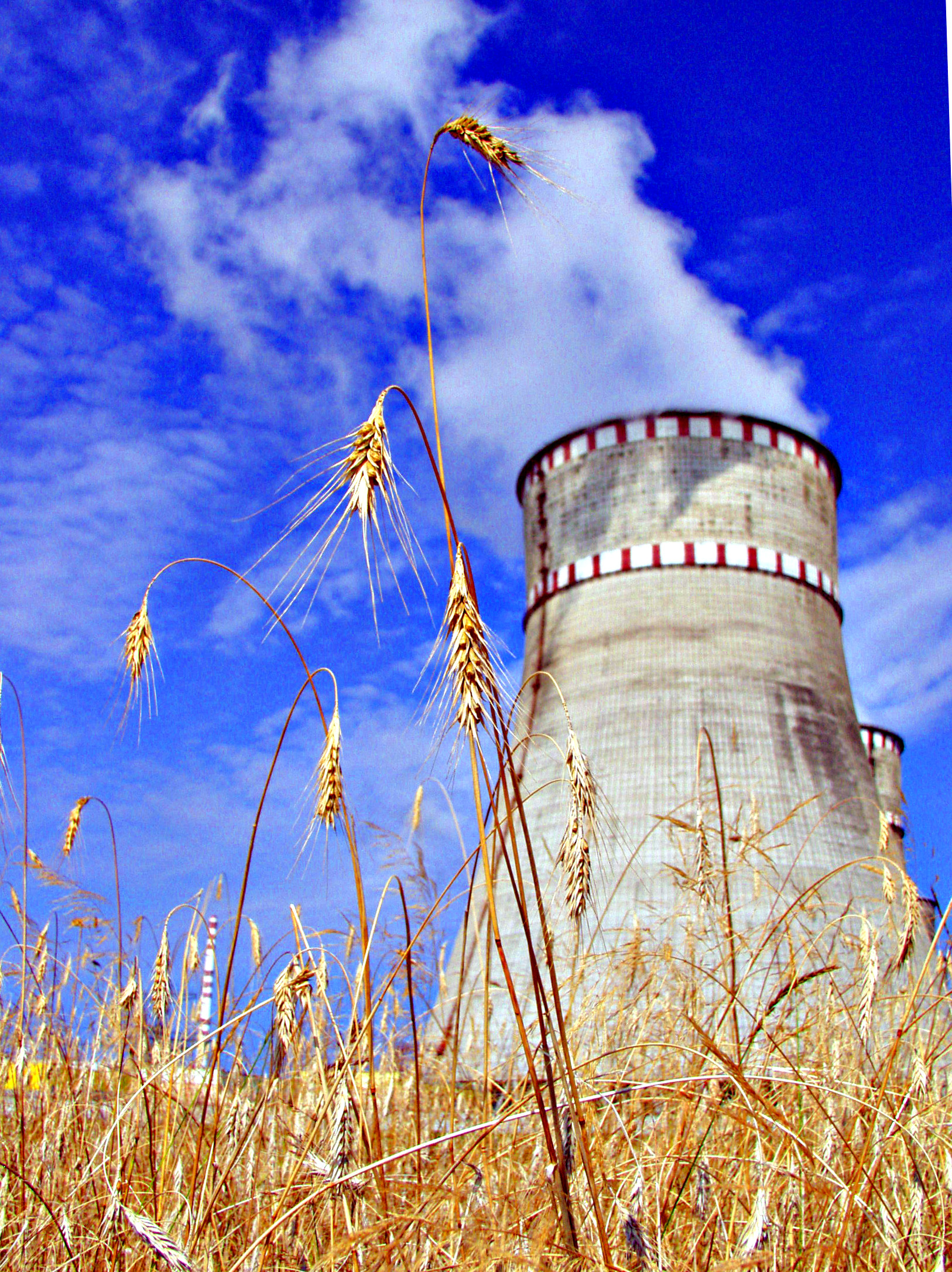
Rivne NPP

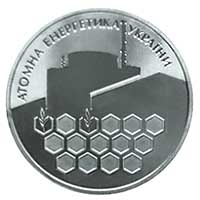
Ukrainian coin commemorating nuclear power

Ukraine relies to a large extent on nuclear power. The largest nuclear power plant in Europe, the Zaporizhzhia Nuclear Power Plant, is located in Ukraine. In 2006, the government planned to build 11 new reactors by the year 2030, which would have almost doubled the current amount of nuclear power capacity.

== History ==
=== History of Soviet origin ===
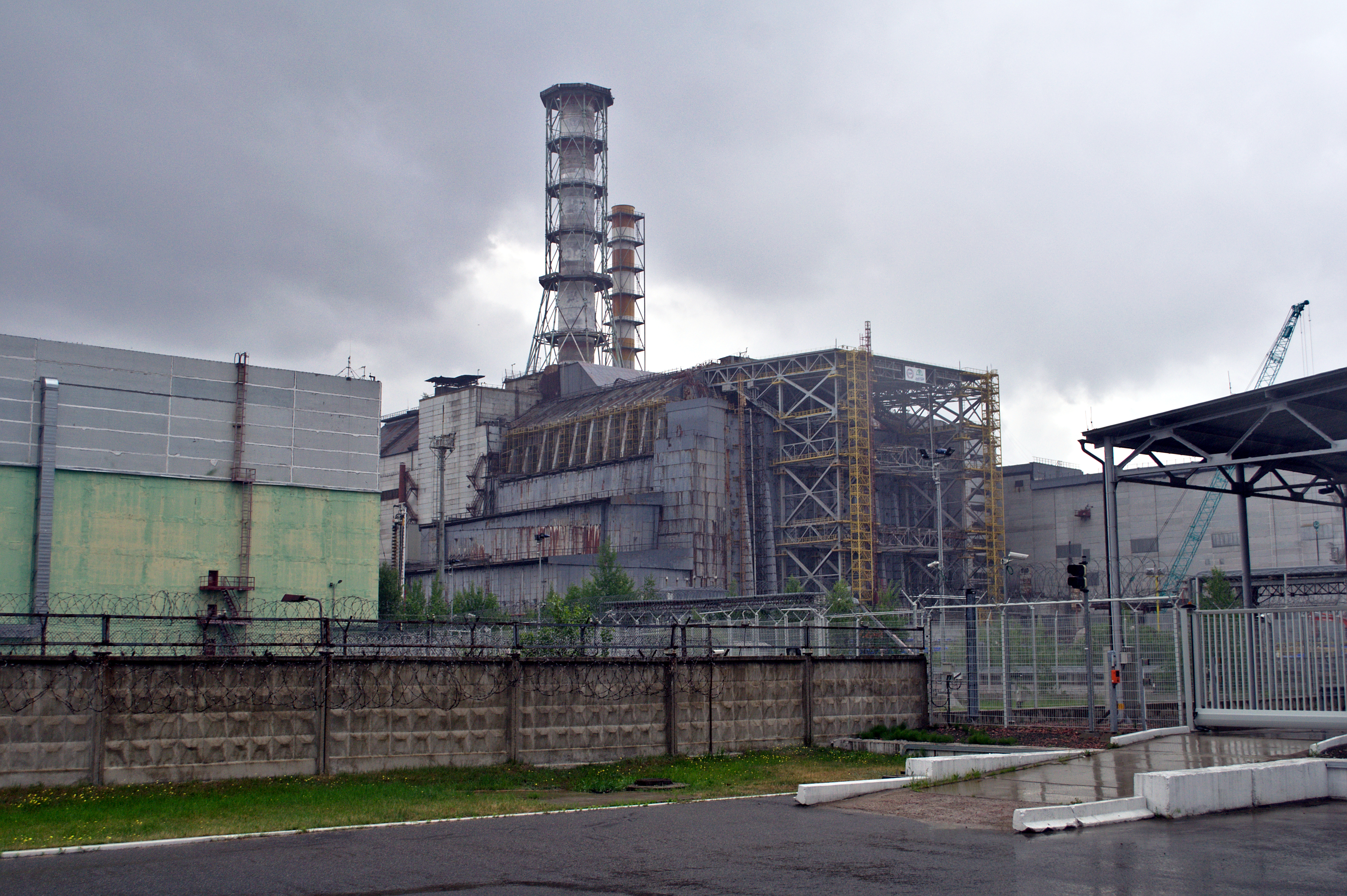
Chernobyl NPP

The Chernobyl disaster was a nuclear accident that occurred on 26 April 1986 at the Chernobyl Nuclear Power Plant in Ukrainian Soviet Socialist Republic of the Soviet Union. An explosion and fire released large quantities of radioactive contamination into the atmosphere, which spread over much of Western USSR and Europe. It is considered the worst nuclear power plant accident in history, and is one of only two classified as a level 7 event on the International Nuclear Event Scale (the other being the Fukushima Daiichi nuclear disaster). The battle to contain the contamination and avert a greater catastrophe ultimately involved over 500,000 workers and cost an estimated 18 billion rubles, crippling the Soviet economy.

At the moment of Chornobyl disaster there were also 6 more stations at various stages of design and construction: Crimean NPP (Shkolkine), Chornobyl NPP II, Chyhyryn NPP (Orbita), Kyiv NTEC (Otashiv), Kharkiv NTEC (Birky), Odesa NTEC (Teplodar), with more than 20 units. In total, the construction of about 40 nuclear units at NPPs, NPPPs, NSPT, etc. was planned for the future development in Ukraine.

Ukraine used to receive its nuclear fuel exclusively from Russia by the Russian company TVEL. From 2008 onward, the country also got nuclear fuel from Westinghouse. Since 2014 Westinghouse's share of imports grew to more than 30% in 2016 due to strong social disapproval of any economic relations with Russia after the annexation of Crimea. In 2018, Westinghouse's contract to supply VVER fuel was extended to 2025.

=== Recent renewal and transformation ===
In 2011 Energoatom began a project to bring safety into line with international standards at an estimated cost of $1.8 billion, with a target completion date of 2017. In 2015 the completion date was put back to 2020, due to financing delays. In 2015 some government agencies made corruption allegations against Energoatom, with concerns raised by Prime Minister Arseniy Yatsenyuk. In March 2016, Energoatom's assets and bank accounts were frozen by Ukrainian courts over allegedly unpaid debts; Energoatom appealed the decision, but the frozen finances led to contractual breaches. In June 2016 its bank accounts were unfrozen.

On May 27, 2013, the Cabinet of Ministers of Ukraine approved the Neutron Source project.

In 2016, Energoatom and the Korean company Korea Hydro & Nuclear Power (KHNP) signed a Memorandum of Understanding to expand cooperation in the nuclear energy industry.

In February 2018 Ukraine secured $250 million of U.S. funding to build a spent nuclear fuel storage facility, which will avoid the need to ship spent nuclear fuel to Russia.

In 2018 Energoatom stated that electricity prices were too low to cover the cost of new nuclear fuel, and called for a price increase.

In 2008 Westinghouse Electric Company won a five-year contract to supply nuclear fuel to three Ukrainian reactors starting in 2011. Following Euromaidan, then President Viktor Yanukovych introduced a ban on Rosatom nuclear fuel shipments to Europe via Ukraine, which was in effect from 28 January until 6 March 2014. By 2016, Russia's share was down to 55 percent, Westinghouse supplying nuclear fuel for six of Ukraine's VVER-1000 nuclear reactors. After the Russian annexation of Crimea in April 2014, Energoatom and Westinghouse extended the contract for fuel deliveries through 2020.

In 2019 Energoatom and Turboatom signed a five-year contract to modernize condensers and turbines at a number of Ukrainian nuclear power plants.

On 4 December 2019, Ukraine's government appointed Pavlo Pavlyshyn as acting head of Energoatom. In January 2020, Energoatom discussed eight legislative bills with the chairperson of the Ukrainian parliament subcommittee on nuclear energy and safety, aimed at meeting international obligations and standards, and the financial stabilization of Energoatom.

In September 2020, KHNP announced that it was negotiating with Energoatom to participate in a new construction project for the Rivne NPP based on the APR-1400 reactor design.

In August 2021 Energoatom and Westinghouse signed a contract for construction of 2 Westinghouse AP1000 reactors as blocks 5 and 6 at the Khmelnitskyi nuclear power plant.

=== 2022 ===
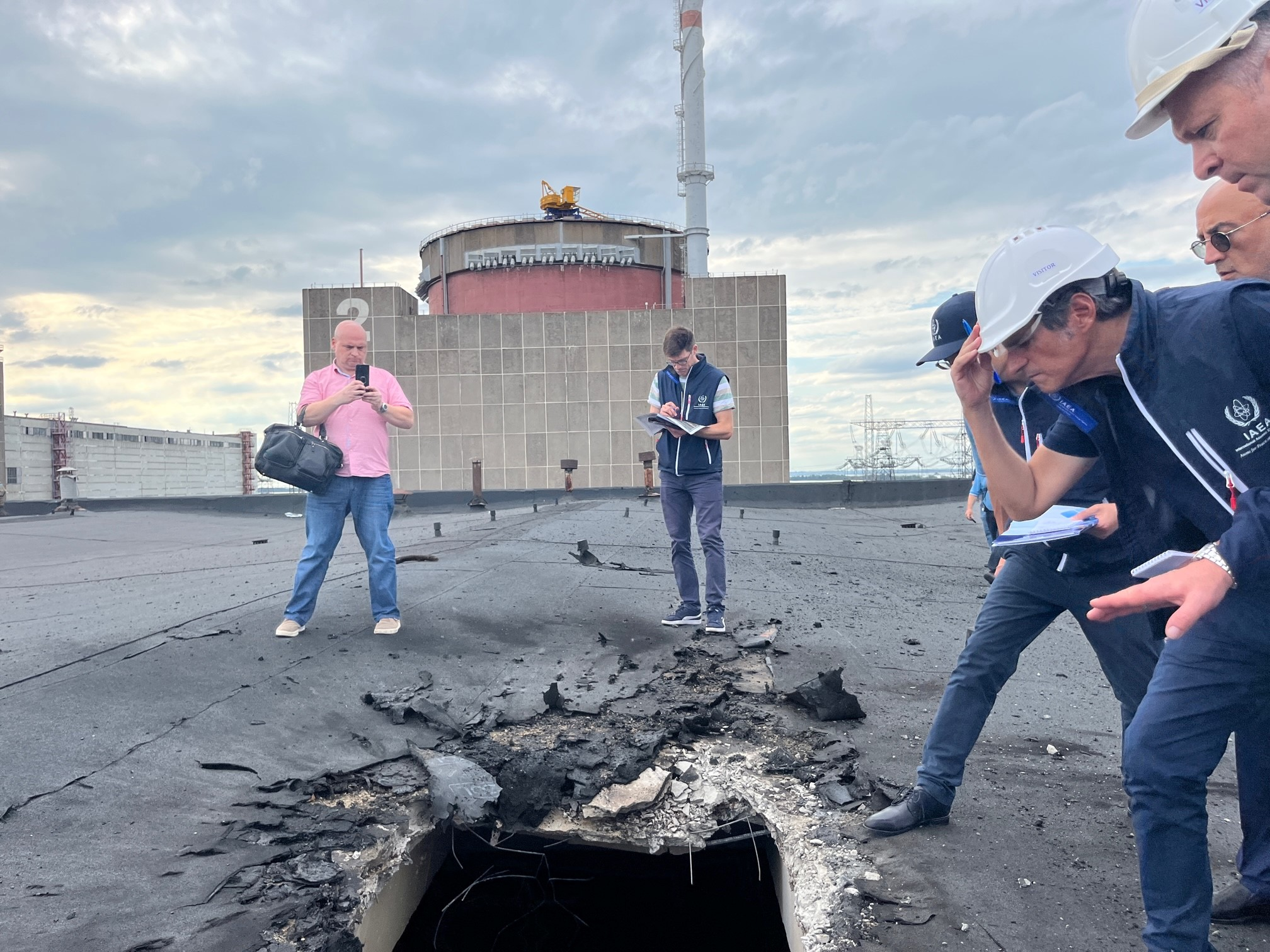
Rafael Grossi and IAEA mission team members at the Zaporizhzhia Nuclear Power Plant on 1 September 2022

On 24 February 2022, the Ukrainian electricity grid disconnected from the post-Soviet IPS/UPS grid, ahead of synchronizing with the Synchronous grid of Continental Europe which was achieved on March 16.

In March 2022, Russian forces seized control of the Zaporizhzhia Nuclear Power Plant. It continues to operate and supply data, including from a remote monitoring system, to the International Atomic Energy Agency. On 6 June, IAEA Director General Rafael Grossi said "at least five of the seven indispensable pillars of nuclear safety and security have been compromised" in Russia's occupation of the plant, and after attacks in August, that all seven had been breached. The nuclear power plant has been damaged even after Russia took control of it due the attempts of the Ukrainian military forces to retake control of it.

=== 2024 ===
In April 2024, the government approved the completion of units No. 3 and No. 4 of Khmelnytskyi NPP, as well as the construction of new units No. 5 and No. 6 using American technology AP1000 has begun, and the cost of construction of the general block will be approximately $5 billion. On May 7, 2024, it was announced that the preparatory works for the construction of 2 new units No. 4 and No. 5 on South Ukraine NPP.

== Fuel cycle ==
=== Production of nuclear fuel ===
The issue of lifting the Russian monopoly on the supply of fresh nuclear fuel to Ukraine was raised back in 1998.

Work on the introduction of fuel manufactured by Westinghouse began in 2000 under the Executive Agreement between the Government of Ukraine and the Government of the United States of America regarding the Nuclear Fuel Qualification Project for Ukraine, signed on June 5, 2000.

At the end of 2018, the thousandth Westinghouse (USA) fuel assembly should arrive at the South Ukrainian NPP. From 2022, the Rivne NPP will switch to assemblies from Westinghouse, a batch of 42 cassettes with nuclear fuel from the American company Westinghouse has already arrived. Assemblies with American fuel are planned to be loaded into the reactor core of power unit No. 3 of the RANP in 2022. From 2023, the power unit should start operating entirely on American fuel.

As of 2018, Westinghouse nuclear fuel is used in 6 power units of Ukrainian nuclear power plants. After 2021, it will be used in 7 out of 15 Ukrainian nuclear power units. The power unit of the Rivne NPP will be transferred to American assemblies. Also, the production of components (heads and shanks) for Westinghouse fuel cartridges will be launched at the facilities of the Ukrainian enterprise "Atomenergomash".

The shipment of the thousandth assembly of Westinghouse fuel to the Ukrainian NPP is a significant event in the long-term cooperation between Energoatom and Westinghouse, because the successful implementation of the new energy strategy until 2035 is impossible without diversification of the supply of nuclear fuel. In the current situation, there is a gradual curtailment of the nuclear fuel supply diversification program. The production of its own nuclear fuel in Ukraine, despite the reserves of raw materials, is currently not established.

In the fall of 2019, the intention to build a nuclear fuel fabrication plant near the South Ukrainian NPP was announced.

In 2023, Energoatom became the first company in the world to implement with Westinghouse a project to replace Russian fuel for VVER-440 reactors, in addition to the previously implemented replacement of Russian fuel for VVER-1000.

=== Uranium mining ===
In 2005 there were 17 deposits on the state balance account. Three of them Vatutine, Central, and Michurinske were being developed, while an ore enrichment factory was being built at Novokostiantyniv. Number of deposits are exhausted (i.e. Devladove, Zhovtorichenske, Pershotravneve, Bratske).

Activists have been long alerting about Dnipro Chemical Plant in Kamianske, which is a Soviet-times military uranium processing facility that consists of industrial buildings, equipment containing uranium waste as well as large landfills where tailings were stored. Small scale soil, water and dust leaks have been documented from the facility, but apart from securing the perimeter not much has been done to properly secure the plant.

== List of reactors ==
All of Ukraine's RBMK reactors (the type involved in the 1986 Chernobyl disaster) were located at the Chernobyl Nuclear Power Plant. All of the reactors there have been shut down, leaving only the much safer VVER reactors operating in the country. Three of the reactors listed were built in post-independence Ukraine, with the first one of these being constructed in 1995; the other sixteen reactors the country inherited from the Soviet Union.

Nuclear power plants in Ukraine (view)

Active plants
Unfinished plants
Destroyed plants
Cancelled plants

Future plants

=== Active plants with power generating capabilities ===
Name	Location	Unit Number	Type	Capacity (MW)	Years of Operation	Notes
Khmelnytskyi	Netishyn	1	VVER	1000	1987–	
Khmelnytskyi	Netishyn	2	VVER	1000	2004–	
Khmelnytskyi	Netishyn	3	VVER	1000	Under Construction	Project started in 1986
Khmelnytskyi	Netishyn	4	VVER	1000	Under Construction	Project started in 1986
Khmelnytskyi	Netishyn	5	AP1000	1100	--	Planned
Khmelnytskyi	Netishyn	6	AP1000	1100	--	Planned
Rivne	Varash	1	VVER	440	1980–	
Rivne	Varash	2	VVER	440	1981–	
Rivne	Varash	3	VVER	1000	1986–	
Rivne	Varash	4	VVER	1000	2004–	
Rivne	Varash	5	AP1000	1100	--	Planned
South Ukraine	Pivdennoukrainsk	1	VVER	1000	1982–	
South Ukraine	Pivdennoukrainsk	2	VVER	1000	1985–	
South Ukraine	Pivdennoukrainsk	3	VVER	1000	1989–	
South Ukraine	Pivdennoukrainsk	4	VVER	1000	Unfinished	Project started in 1987, abandoned in 1989
South Ukraine	Pivdennoukrainsk	5	AP1000	1100	--	Planned
South Ukraine	Pivdennoukrainsk	6	AP1000	1100	--	Planned
Zaporizhzhia	Enerhodar	1	VVER	1000	1984–	Largest NPP in Europe, seized by the Russian Federation
Zaporizhzhia	Enerhodar	2	VVER	1000	1985–	Largest NPP in Europe, seized by the Russian Federation
Zaporizhzhia	Enerhodar	3	VVER	1000	1986–	Largest NPP in Europe, seized by the Russian Federation
Zaporizhzhia	Enerhodar	4	VVER	1000	1987–	Largest NPP in Europe, seized by the Russian Federation
Zaporizhzhia	Enerhodar	5	VVER	1000	1989–	Largest NPP in Europe, seized by the Russian Federation
Zaporizhzhia	Enerhodar	6	VVER	1000	1995–	Largest NPP in Europe, seized by the Russian Federation
Total	Ukraine			13819	1981 (1978)–	

=== Research reactors ===
Name	Location	Type	Capacity, MWe	Operational	Notes
Sevastopol University	Sevastopol	IR-100	0.2	1967–	Seized by the Russian Federation
Institute for Nuclear Research NASU	Kyiv	VVR-M	10	1960–	
Kharkiv Institute of Physics and Technology	Kharkiv	"Neutron Source"		2016–	Accelerator-driven_subcritical_reactor

=== Unfinished and closed plants ===
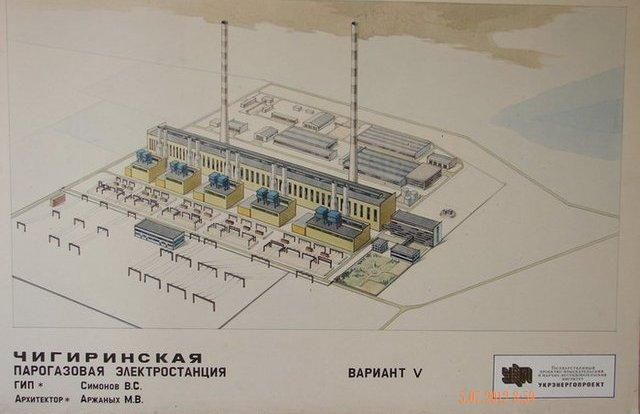
Chyhyryn NPP (draft)

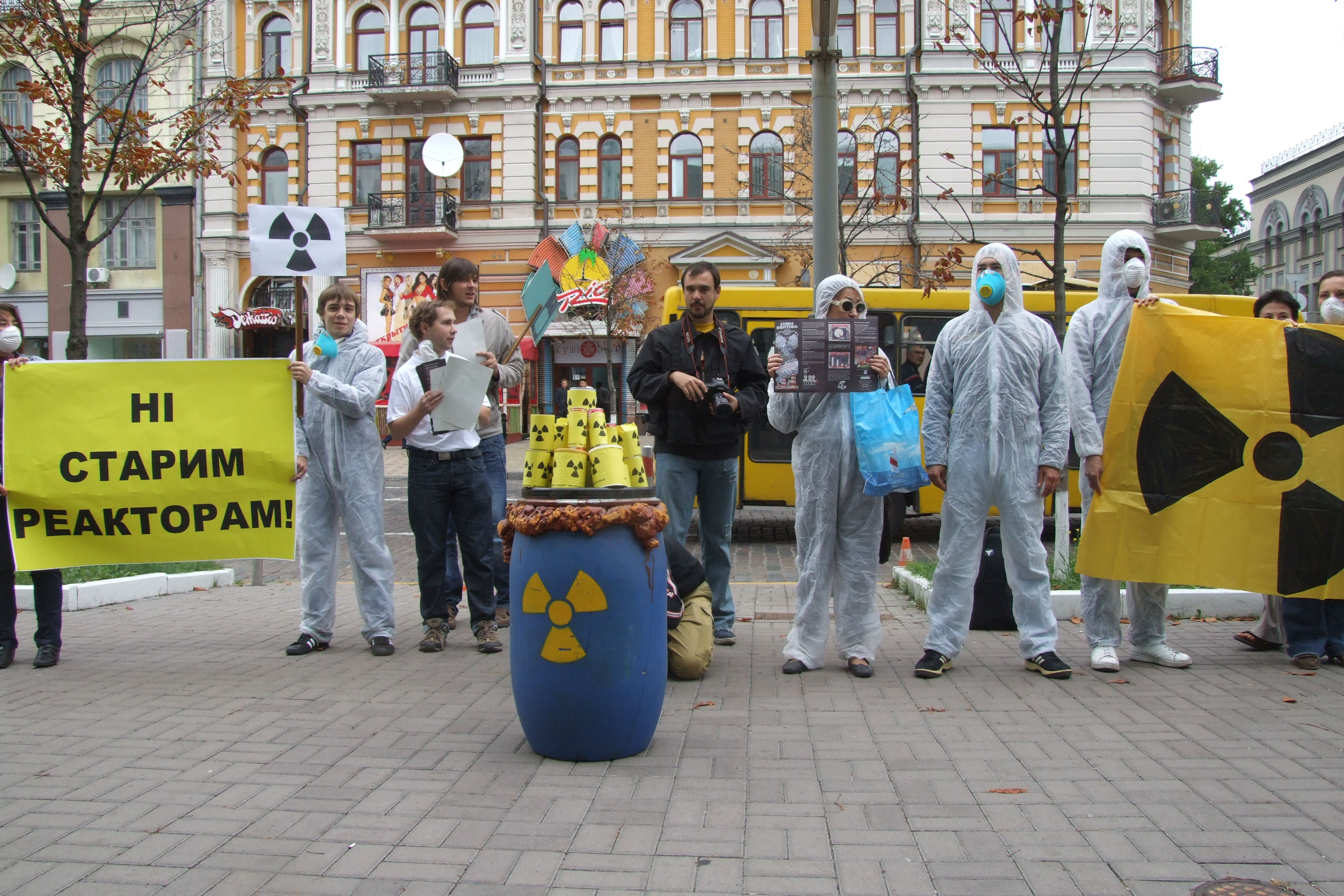
Anti-nuclear picket in Kyiv

Name	Location	Unit Number	Type	Capacity (MW)	Years of Operation	Status	Notes
Chernobyl NPP	Pripyat	1	RBMK	1000	1977–1996	Decommissioned	Gradually decommissioned following accident
Chernobyl NPP	Pripyat	2	RBMK	1000	1978–1991	Decommissioned	Gradually decommissioned following accident
Chernobyl NPP	Pripyat	3	RBMK	1000	1981–2000	Decommissioned	Gradually decommissioned following accident
Chernobyl NPP	Pripyat	4	RBMK	1000	1984–1986	Destroyed	Exploded in the Chernobyl Accident
Chernobyl NPP	Pripyat	5	RBMK	1000	None	Unfinished Construction	Project started in 1981, abandoned in 1987
Chernobyl NPP	Pripyat	6	RBMK	1000	None	Unfinished Construction	Project started in 1981, abandoned in 1987
Crimean NPP	Shcholkine	1	VVER	950	None	Unfinished Construction	Abandoned in 1989
Crimean NPP	Shcholkine	2	VVER	950	None	Unfinished Construction	Abandoned in 1989
Crimean NPP	Shcholkine	3	VVER	950	None	Never Built	Cancelled in 1989
Crimean NPP	Shcholkine	4	VVER	950	None	Never Built	Cancelled in 1989
Odesa NTEC	Teplodar	1	VVER	940	None	Unfinished Construction	Abandoned in 1989
Odesa NTEC	Teplodar	2	VVER	940	None	Unfinished Construction	Abandoned in 1989
Kharkiv NTEC	Birky	1	VVER	940	None	Unfinished Construction	Project started in 1986, abandoned in 1989
Kharkiv NTEC	Birky	2	VVER	940	None	Unfinished Construction	Project started in 1986, abandoned in 1989
Kharkiv NTEC	Birky	3	VVER	940	None	Never Built	Cancelled in 1989
Kharkiv NTEC	Birky	4	VVER	940	None	Never Built	Cancelled in 1989
Chyhyryn NPP	Orbita	1	VVER	1000	None	Unfinished Construction	Abandoned in 1989, considered to renew building with new design since 2021
Chyhyryn NPP	Orbita	2	VVER	1000	None	Unfinished Construction	Abandoned in 1989, considered to renew building with new design since 2021
Chyhyryn NPP	Orbita	3	VVER	1000	None	Unfinished Construction	Abandoned in 1989, considered to renew building with new design since 2021
Chyhyryn NPP	Orbita	4	VVER	1000	None	Unfinished Construction	Abandoned in 1989, considered to renew building with new design since 2021
Novoazovsk NTEC	Novoazovsk	1	VVER	500	None	Never built	Cancelled
Novoazovsk NTEC	Novoazovsk	2	VVER	500	None	Never built	Cancelled
Novoazovsk NTEC	Novoazovsk	3	VVER	500	None	Never built	Cancelled
Novoazovsk NTEC	Novoazovsk	4	VVER	500	None	Never built	Cancelled
Kyiv NTEC	Otashiv	1	VVER	1000	None	Never built	Cancelled in 1986
Kyiv NTEC	Otashiv	2	VVER	1000	None	Never built	Cancelled in 1986
Ivano-Frankivsk NPP	Rozhniativ	1	VVER	1000	None	Never built	Cancelled
Ivano-Frankivsk NPP	Rozhniativ	2	VVER	1000	None	Never built	Cancelled
Zakarpattia NPP	Monastyrets, Khust district	1	VVER	1000?	None	Never built	Cancelled, planned during independence
Zakarpattia NPP	Monastyrets, Khust district	2	VVER	1000?	None	Never built	Cancelled, planned during independence
Kherson NPP		1	?	?	None	Never built	Cancelled, planned during independence
Kherson NPP		2	?	?	None	Never built	Cancelled, planned during independence
Slavhorod NPP		1	?	?	None	Never built	Cancelled, planned during independence
Slavhorod NPP		2	?	?	None	Never built	Cancelled, planned during independence

== Reactor engineering ==
The American company Holtec chose Ukraine as a place for the construction of a new enterprise for the production of small modular reactors.

On June 10, 2019, a Partnership Agreement was signed between Energoatom, the National Research Center for Nuclear Power and Nuclear Energy, and Holtec International at the Holtec International headquarters in Camden (New Jersey, USA). The document was signed by the heads of the companies — Yurii Nedashkovskyi, Ihor Shevchenko and Chris Singh. The signed tripartite agreement provides for the creation of an international consortium, the purpose of which is to promote the implementation of SMR-160 small modular reactor (SMR) technology in Ukraine.

On April 17, 2024, Energoatom and the Holtec International announced the intention of manufacturing of components for small modular reactors in Ukraine.

== Waste disposal ==
In July 2019, a plant for the processing of liquid radioactive waste began operating at the industrial site of the Chernobyl Nuclear Power Plant, which processed almost 3 tons of waste during the first week of operation. The plant processes liquid radioactive waste, which during the technological process is cemented and transformed into safer for storage and disposal.

At the moment, the plant has processed 34 "packages", which, after exposure and radiation control, will be directed to burial in a special near-surface storage of solid radioactive waste. Gradually, the plant should start processing 42 packages - barrels with a capacity of 200 liters - per day. Assuming uninterrupted plant operation for all 250 working days, this is 10.5 thousand packages per year.

The construction of the plant for the processing of liquid radioactive waste was approved back in 2001, but the completion of construction and complex tests took place only in 2014.

=== Centralized storage ===
Since 2001, negotiations have been held between Energoatom, the Ukrainian authorities and foreign companies regarding the construction of a Centralized Storage Facility for spent nuclear fuel in the Chernobyl Exclusion Zone.

On January 24, 2022, Energoatom completed the two-month stand-alone tests of the CNFS systems in cold mode. Comprehensive cold tests were conducted from January 26 to February 4, 2022.

On April 25, 2022, the State Inspectorate for Nuclear Regulation of Ukraine issued a permit to SE "NAEK 'Energoatom'" to carry out activities, which was expected as early as March 9, but was postponed due to Russian aggression and the presence of occupying troops in the Chernobyl exclusion zone.

== See also ==
- Electricity sector in Ukraine
- Ukrenergo, Ukrainian electricity grid operator
- List of power stations in Ukraine
- List of Chernobyl-related articles
