= Nuclear power in Kazakhstan =

Nuclear power plants in Kazakhstan (view)
Shut down
Planned

The utilization of nuclear power in Kazakhstan began with Kazakhstan's first nuclear power plant, the BN-350 fast-neutron reactor in Aktau, operating from 1973 to 1999, a Soviet era prototype investment preceding the BN-600 reactor. Since 1999, it has only operated four smaller research reactors and did not have nuclear electricity production capabilities. Kazakhstan is the number one country in the world for uranium production volumes, which is used for nuclear fuel. Current plans, reaching back to 1997, foresee the construction of two new nuclear power plants near the towns of Ülken and Kurchatov. The plans were last backed by the 2024 Kazakh nuclear power referendum.

== First nuclear reactors ==
Kazakhstan's first nuclear power reactor was the sodium-cooled BN-350 fast-neutron reactor at the Mangyshlak Nuclear Power Plant in Aktau on the shore of the Caspian Sea. Construction began in 1964, when Kazakhstan was still part of the USSR. The plant first produced electricity in 1973 with an output of 350 MWe. In addition, BN-350 was also used for producing plutonium for the nuclear weapons program and for desalination to supply fresh water. Besides the BN-350 power reactor, Kazakhstan has four research reactors, three at the former Semipalatinsk Test Site near Kurchatov (IGR, EWG 1 and IVG.1M) and one in Alatau, near Almaty, at the Institute of Nuclear Physics (WWR-K). Another research reactor at Kurchatov, RA, with 60 MW of thermal power was operational since 1989, and disassembled in 1998.

After Kazakhstan's declaration of independence from the Soviet Union in 1991, the territory was denuclearized by returning all nuclear warheads to the Russian Federation in 1994. The Mangyshlak plant's lifetime of the reactor officially finished in 1993, and in June 1994, the reactor was forced to shut down because of a lack of funds to buy fuel. By 1995, the plant's operating license had expired. When plutonium-bearing spent fuel stopped being produced, reactor operations finally ended in 1999.

Kazakhstan has long played an important role for nuclear fuel production. Uranium exploration began in 1943. The country has since expanded its uranium mining capabilities and in 2011 became the largest producer of uranium in the world. Exported uranium from Kazakhstan supplies nuclear reactors of many countries worldwide.

== Plans for new reactors ==
Plans for the construction of new nuclear reactors reach back to 1997, before the final shutdown of BN-350. In 1998 the Kazakh government announced its intentions to construct a new power reactor near lake Balqash, which however was not implemented in the following years. Since 2006, plans for new reactors were discussed with Russia, and a memorandum of understanding for the construction of reactors was signed with the Russian nuclear corporation Rosatom in 2014. The first reactor was then foreseen to be sited near Kurchatov.

In 2013 Kazakhstan adopted a “Green Economy Concept” to shift its 97% fossil fuel electricity production to at least 50% renewable and nuclear sources until 2050, and reach full carbon neutrality by 2060. To this end, the government commits to the development of nuclear capacities:

If Kazakhstan has set a course for carbon neutrality then there is no other choice but to construct several nuclear power plants

— Zhandos Nurmaganbetov, energy minister, August 3rd, 2022,

Nevertheless, the nuclear plant construction was still postponed for a “lack of immediate need” for additional electricity in 2016, but prospected energy requirements show a 1400 MW deficit in the southern zone as early as 2028.

An International Atomic Energy Agency report at the government's request from 2016 declared that “Kazakhstan is well-positioned to continue developing its civilian nuclear program”. From 2019 to 2022 the planning has picked up speed, and several suppliers from different countries have submitted offers for plant constructions. As of 2022 the government was evaluating six potential suppliers: NuScale Power (USA), the US-Japanese consortium GVH, KHNP (Korea), CNNC (China), Rosatom (Russia) and EDF (France). The current government plan foresees the construction of the first plant with 1200 MW at Ülken near lake Balqash, and the second plant at Kurchatov with 2× 300 MW. Until 2035 Kazakhstan wants to have 2.4 GW of nuclear power capacity.

On 6 October 2024, Kazakhstan held a referendum amongst voters on the construction of its first modern nuclear power reactor. The referendum was supported by a 71% majority of voters.

== 2026 agreement with Russia ==
On 28 May 2026, Russia and Kazakhstan signed an intergovernmental agreement for the construction of Kazakhstan's first nuclear power plant near the village of Ulken on the shores of Lake Balkhash. Under the $16.5 billion deal, Russia's state nuclear corporation Rosatom will build the facility, which will feature two VVER-1200 reactors. Construction is scheduled to begin in 2027, with the first reactor expected to be commissioned in early 2034.

== See also ==
- Nuclear power in the Soviet Union
