= Kharkiv Nuclear Power Plant =

Nuclear power plant in Birky, Ukraine

Coordinates: 49.688°N 36.068°E

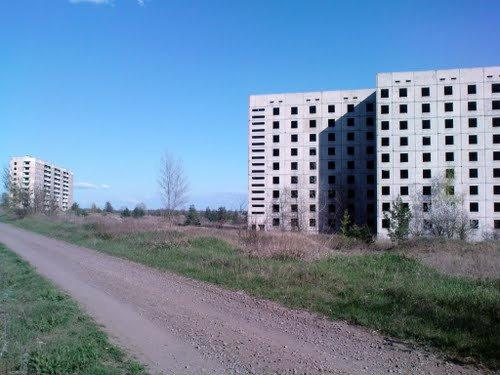
Unfinished infrastructure facilities of the Kharkiv NPP

Kharkiv Nuclear Power Station (Ukrainian: Харківська АТЕЦ) is an unfinished nuclear power plant, located near the village of Birky, Kharkiv Oblast of Ukraine. Two power units with VVER-1000 reactors were supposed to produce electricity, as well as to provide heat to Kharkiv, which was envisaged by the master plan of development of Kharkiv from 1986.

== History ==
The commissioning of several powerful nuclear plants in the European part of USSR, including the Kharkiv power plant, was planned to replace the expensive delivery of fossil coal from Siberia to the traditional CHPP. However, these plans were faced with many difficulties, in the first place with a lack of material resources and a weak organization of work. The Central Committee of the Komsomol, attempted to deploy the construction of the Kharkiv power plant and adopted in 1986 a decision to declare it shock Komsomol, the direction of her "youth on a public call", in addition Council of Ministers of the Ukrainian SSR decided to send 200 residents of the Kharkiv region for construction.

The construction of the main buildings has never been started, only the construction of infrastructure and preparations for major works were carried out. Soon the station suffered a similar fate like many other planned NPPs of the former USSR, the project was abolished and abandoned.

The project of Kharkiv APEC with the capacity of 2000 MW was developed on the basis of the decision of the Council of Ministers of the USSR dated June 26, 1980, No. 540-176. The construction period of the APEC was calculated from 1985 to 1996. The territory of the Kharkiv APEC was to cover the Novo-Vodolazky and Gotvaldovsky (now Zmiivsky) districts of the Kharkiv Oblast, which are located 30 km southwest of the city of Kharkiv. It was supposed that the first unit will be commissioned in 1993, and the second in 1995.

The construction of a residential village was foreseen for resettlement of operational and construction and assembly personnel. Unfinished high-rise buildings are standing there and now. 778 hectares of land were allocated for the construction of the APEC objects, of which 476 were arable land and 143 hectares of grazing. In addition to the design part, correspondence was maintained regarding the allocation of land for construction, where each of the relevant authorities gave consent.

== See also ==
- Nuclear power in Ukraine
