= Nuclear power in Lithuania =

Lithuania operated two Soviet-type nuclear power reactors with a total net capacity of 2.4 GW at Ignalina Nuclear Power Plant between 1983 and 2009. After their shutdown it has not had any operational nuclear power plants.

== History ==
In the Lithuanian SSR in 1978, construction began on two RBMK reactors (1,380 MWe net) with 30-year lives for the Ignalina Nuclear Power Plant. The light-water, graphite-moderated reactors were of similar design as those at Chernobyl. The nuclear power plant began operating in 1983. The first reactor was decommissioned in 2004 and the second one in 2009. Originally, Lithuania built these reactors to export electricity to its neighbours, with 42% of electricity exported in 1989. This number fell through the 1990s as domestic demand increased.

In 1994, Lithuania accepted US$36.8 million from the European Bank for Reconstruction and Development's Nuclear Safety Account to improve safety at the Ignalina site. Under the grant, both the reactors had to be closed within 15–20 years. Moreover, in order to join the EU, Lithuania had to decommission one reactor immediately and the second by 2009. The EU agreed to pay for decommissioning costs and some compensation through 2013. Strong public opposition followed, because of fear for electricity price hikes.

In 2006, Lithuanian, Latvian and Estonian power companies carried out the feasibility study for construction of the new nuclear power plant in Lithuania to replace existing Ignalina Nuclear Power Plant, scheduled to be shut down in 2009. The study shows that the nuclear power plant project is feasible.

The Radioactive Waste Management Agency, established in 2001, is responsible for disposal of all radioactive waste from Ignalina during operation and decommissioning. A site near the plant has been identified for storage of low and intermediate-level waste. According to the World Nuclear Association, the Lithuanian government is in the process of building a permanent repository, to be completed in 2015.

On 14 October 2012 an advisory referendum on constructing a new nuclear plant found 62.7% of the participating Lithuanian electorate against and 34.1% for. In 2016 the instigator of the Visaginas Nuclear Power Plant new build proposal, former energy minister Arvydas Sekmokas, said the proposal was "dead".

== Nuclear power plants ==
Plant name	Unit No.	Type	Model	Status	Capacity (MW)	Begin building	Commercial operation	Closed
Ignalina	1	LWGR	RBMK-1500	Shut down/in decommissioning	1185	1 May 1977	31 Dec 1983	31 Dec 2004
Ignalina	2	LWGR	RBMK-1500	Shut down/in decommissioning	1185	1 Jan 1978	Aug 1987	31 Dec 2009
Ignalina	3	LWGR	RBMK-1500	Unfinished	1185			

== See also ==
- Energy in Lithuania
- Nuclear power in the Soviet Union
