= BN-350 reactor =

Deactivated fast breeder reactor in Aktau, Kazakhstan

Aktau nuclear power plant
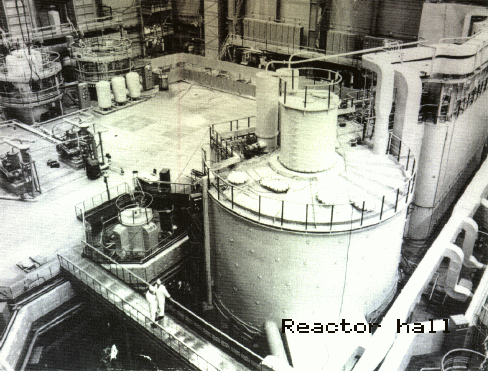
- Country: Kazakhstan
- Location: Aktau
- Coordinates: 43.607°N 51.283°E
- Status: Undergoing decommissioning
- Construction began: 1964
- Commission date: 1973
- Decommission date: 22 April 1999
- Operator: Ministry of Medium Machine-Building

Nuclear power station
- Reactor type: sodium-cooled fast reactor (BN350)
- Reactor supplier: Atomenergoproekt

Power generation
- Make and model: Kharkov Turbine Plant
- Units decommissioned: 1 × 350 MW
- Nameplate capacity: 350 MW

External links
- Website: maek.kz

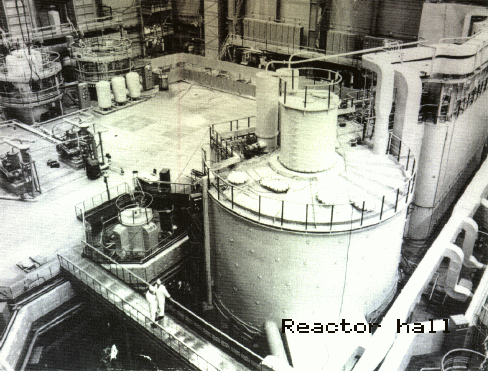
Shevchenko BN-350 nuclear fast reactor and desalination plant situated on the shore of the Caspian Sea. The former plant could generate 350 MW_{e} and provide steam for an associated desalination plant. View of the interior of the reactor hall.

The BN-350 was a sodium-cooled, fast reactor located at the Mangyshlak Nuclear Power Plant (or Mangyshlak Atomic Energy Combine), located in Aktau (formerly known as Shevchenko), Kazakhstan, on the shore of the Caspian Sea.

Construction of the BN-350 fast breeder reactor began in 1964, and the plant first produced electricity in 1973. In addition to providing power for the city (350 MW_{e}), BN-350 was also used for producing plutonium and for desalination to supply 120,000 m³ of fresh water per day to the city.

== Planning and design ==
The prototypes for the development of the BN-350 reactor were the experimental reactor BR-5, built in 1959 on the territory of the Institute of Physics and Power Engineering (IPPE, Obninsk, Kaluga region), and the research reactor BOR-60, introduced at RIAR in 1969. (Melekess, now Dimitrovgrad, Ulyanovsk region). The development of all power reactors was carried out under the scientific guidance of IPPE.

A three-circuit reactor cooling scheme is used. In the first and second circuits, liquid sodium is used as a coolant, in the third circuit, water. The reactor pressure vessel is made of stainless steel with a thickness of 30 millimetres (1.2 in) and a diameter of 2.4 to 6.0 m. The first circuit of the cooling system consists of five active and one reserve loop.

== Closure and decommissioning ==
The project lifetime of the reactor officially finished in 1993, and in June 1994, the reactor was forced to shut down because of a lack of funds to buy fuel. By 1995, the plant's operating license had expired. The facility continued to operate far below capacity until reactor operations ceased in 1999, when plutonium-bearing spent fuel stopped being produced.

Disposition of spent fuel was executed with technical and financial assistance of the US government. Some 3,000 cubic metres (110,000 cu ft) of liquid radioactive waste, mainly sodium and caesium-137 with a half-life of 30 years, are stored at MAEK-Kazatomprom. Short-term safe storage will be 10 years, followed by a long-term dry storage of 50 years. Total decommissioning cost was estimated in 2020 at $330 million to be paid by local residents through the electricity tariff.

For the process of decommissioning to remove the radioactive hazard, Rosatom will assist Kazakhstan on the decommissioning for the BN-350 reactor.

As follows from the materials on the Rosatom procurement website, Techsnabexport JSC will provide assistance to Kazakh partners.

By order of Techsnabexport, the Scientific and Technical Center for the Safety of Nuclear Technologies of Kazakhstan will have to collect and analyze the documents of the regulatory framework of Kazakhstan in the field of decommissioning of nuclear facilities and radioactive waste management and assess the sufficiency of this base for carrying out direct work on decommissioning out of service BN-350. Then it will be necessary to select technologies for solving priority work on transferring the BN-350 to a safe state, develop initial requirements for the structure and composition of technological complexes and infrastructure, develop requirements for space-planning solutions and perform an indicative (aggregated) economic assessment of the decisions made.

According to the project, the decommissioning of the BN-350 is planned to be carried out in three stages. First, it is planned to transfer the reactor facility to a state of safe storage within 10 years, then ensure long-term safe storage within 50 years, and then perform partial or complete dismantling of equipment, buildings and structures, and ensure the management of radioactive waste.

== See also ==
- BN-reactor
- BN-600 reactor
- BN-800 reactor – Russian fast breeder nuclear reactor, operating since 2016
- Nuclear power in Kazakhstan
- Nuclear power in the Soviet Union
