= Orbita, Ávila =

Orbita
- municipality
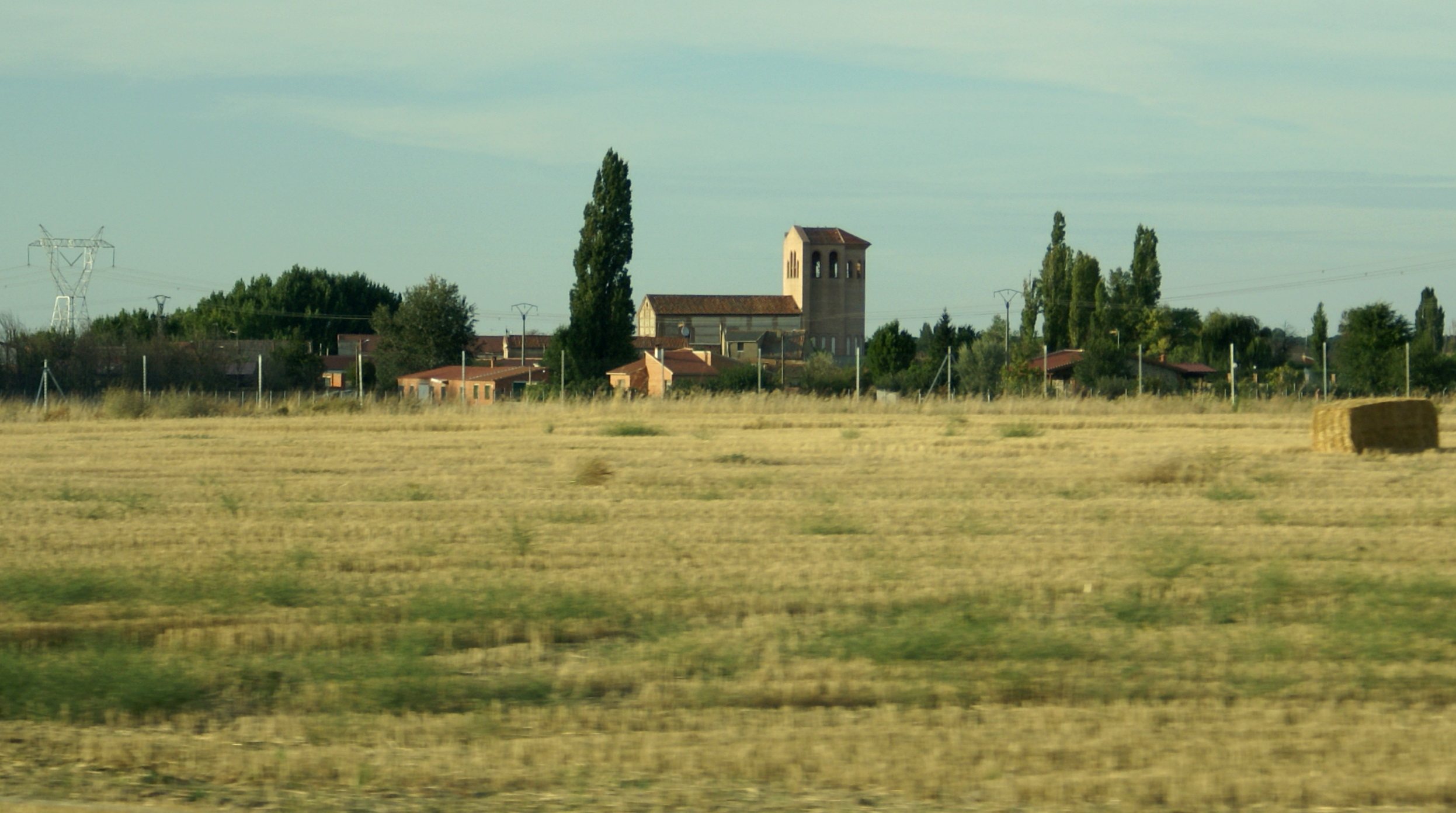
- Flag Coat of arms
- Location in Spain. Orbita (Spain)
- Coordinates: 40°59′55″N 4°38′51″W
- Country: Spain
- Autonomous community: Castile and León
- Province: Ávila
- Municipality: Orbita

Area
  - Total: 14 km^{2} (5.4 sq mi)

Population (2025-01-01)
  - Total: 70
  - Density: 5.0/km^{2} (13/sq mi)
- Time zone: UTC+1 (CET)
  - Summer (DST): UTC+2 (CEST)
- Website: Official website

Orbita is a municipality located in the province of Ávila, Castile and León, Spain.

== Population ==
Historical population
Year	Pop.	±% p.a.
2023	70	—
2024	69	−1.43%
2025	70	+1.45%
Source: INE
