= Orbita (collective) =

Latvian Russian-language poetry and multimedia art collective

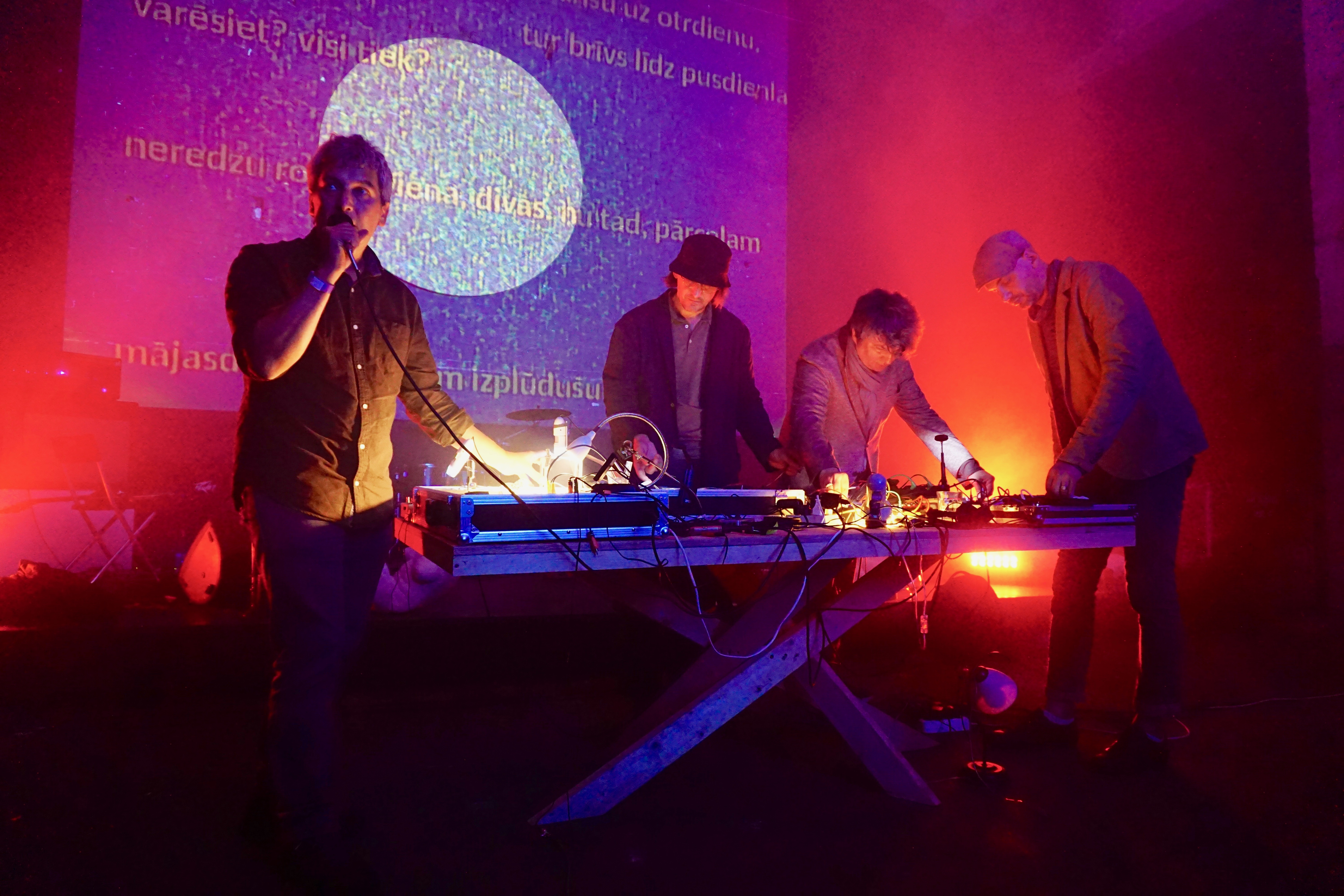
The Orbita Group performing their “Motopoesis” show in Riga, Latvia in June, 2019. Left to right: Semyon Khanin, Vladimir Svetlov, Artur Punte, and Sergej Timofejev.

Orbita is a Latvian Russian-language poetry and multimedia art collective founded in Riga, Latvia in 1999.

== History ==
Orbita was originally founded by five members: Semyon Khanin, Artur Punte, Vladimir Svetlov, Sergej Timofejev, and Zhorzh Uallik. At present, all founders (excluding Zhorzh Uallik) are active in the group. Additionally, Sergej Timofejev has called designer Vladimir Lejbgam the honorary "sixth member" of Orbita, due to their many successful collaborations. The group is also affiliated with a myriad of other Latvian and Russian artists and creatives spanning many genres and such forms of art as photography, composition, visual art. Orbita is heavily involved in Latvian literary and visual culture. In fact, nearly all of the poetry presented by Orbita is published in Russian-Latvian bilingual editions. The group organized five "Word in Motion" multimedia poetry festivals between 2001 and 2011.

== Publishing ==
They also founded a press, active since 2000. Orbita has published 5 eponymously-titled almanacs, containing poetry and art, along with a collection of short prose works entitled Проза/Proza. They've also published poetry by the collective's own members, poetry by other Latvian poets and authors, photography editions, and poetry anthologies.

== Electronic Media and Performances ==
Orbita's works often utilize the internet and software to disseminate poetry in innovative forms. Famously, they set up a poetry-based pirate radio station called "Marx FM," which broadcast in Riga until it was taken down in 2014. In В Римчике/ In Rimi Supermarket/ Rimčikā, Alexander Zapol and Daniil Cherkassky produced an altered Google Translate window, which edited entered text and used a distinct human voice to read the new text out loud.

Experimenting with performance and perception has always been a part of Orbita's mission: their first performance was a poetry reading delivered from a boat, which ended with them sailing away from reporters. There have also been performances which rely entirely on their location, such as "Like Thronging Beasts," which used the squeaking chairs in the Riga Circus to accompany the spoken words. The group has immortalized some of their performances on CDs and DVDs, as well as on their Vimeo account. Also on their Vimeo are their numerous works of video poetry, which were featured in a retrospective at the Riga International Biennale of Contemporary Art in 2018.

== Installations and exhibitions ==
To celebrate Riga as the EU's European Capital of Culture for 2014, Orbita presented the "Riga Poetry Map," a participatory installation inviting Riga's artists to add to it. Their installation "2 Sonnets from Laputa" was featured in the 2015 Venice Biennale Collateral program. The following year, the group went on tour in the United States to promote the release of "Hit Parade: The Orbita Group," a collection of Russian/English translations. In 2018, Orbita's installations were featured in two Latvian festivals: the Riga International Biennial of Contemporary Art and Survival Kit 10.0. Additionally, that year Orbita mounted a solo exhibition titled "Where Does The Poetry (or "Do Poems") Come From?" They also created an installation called "leraks_tīts" for the Latvian Museum of Literature, which incorporated technology to play a fake pre-war poetry reading. These exhibits, and others, focus on how poetry can be "delivered" to a reader. "The Twinkling Crystal of Revelation," for instance, projected the words of a poem on moving fan blades in the international art show "My Heart is a Tiger." In 2020, they collaborated with the National Library of Latvia to create "2020: A Prospective on Eternity," which ran until June of that year.

Orbita also facilitates the installation and exhibition of other artists with the "Word in Motion" festivals, which have been held five times between 2001 and 2011.

== Artistry ==
As a group, Orbita is known for its use of free verse, which is quite distinct from classical and even the majority of contemporary Russian-language poetry. Orbita is also known for their extensive ventures into video poetry and performance poetry.

Much of the group's work observes and explores many themes relating to geography, borders, and the movement (both temporally and metaphorically) between these borders.

== Reception ==
Orbita has been cited as an influential force in the shaping of contemporary Latvian poetry. The group has been well-received not only in Latvia, but in many other European and North American countries as well. This reception includes things like exhibition and publishing of the group's works in festivals across these countries.

== Recognition ==
As a group, Orbita has received the following awards:

- Annual Literary Prize of the Union of Latvian Writers - 2005
- Annual Prize for the Best Photography Album - 2006
- Annual Prize for the Best Photograph Exhibit - 2007
- Sergey Kuryokhin Contemporary Art Award, Best Media Object - 2018
