= Teplodar =

City in Odesa Oblast, Ukraine

Teplodar Теплодар
- City
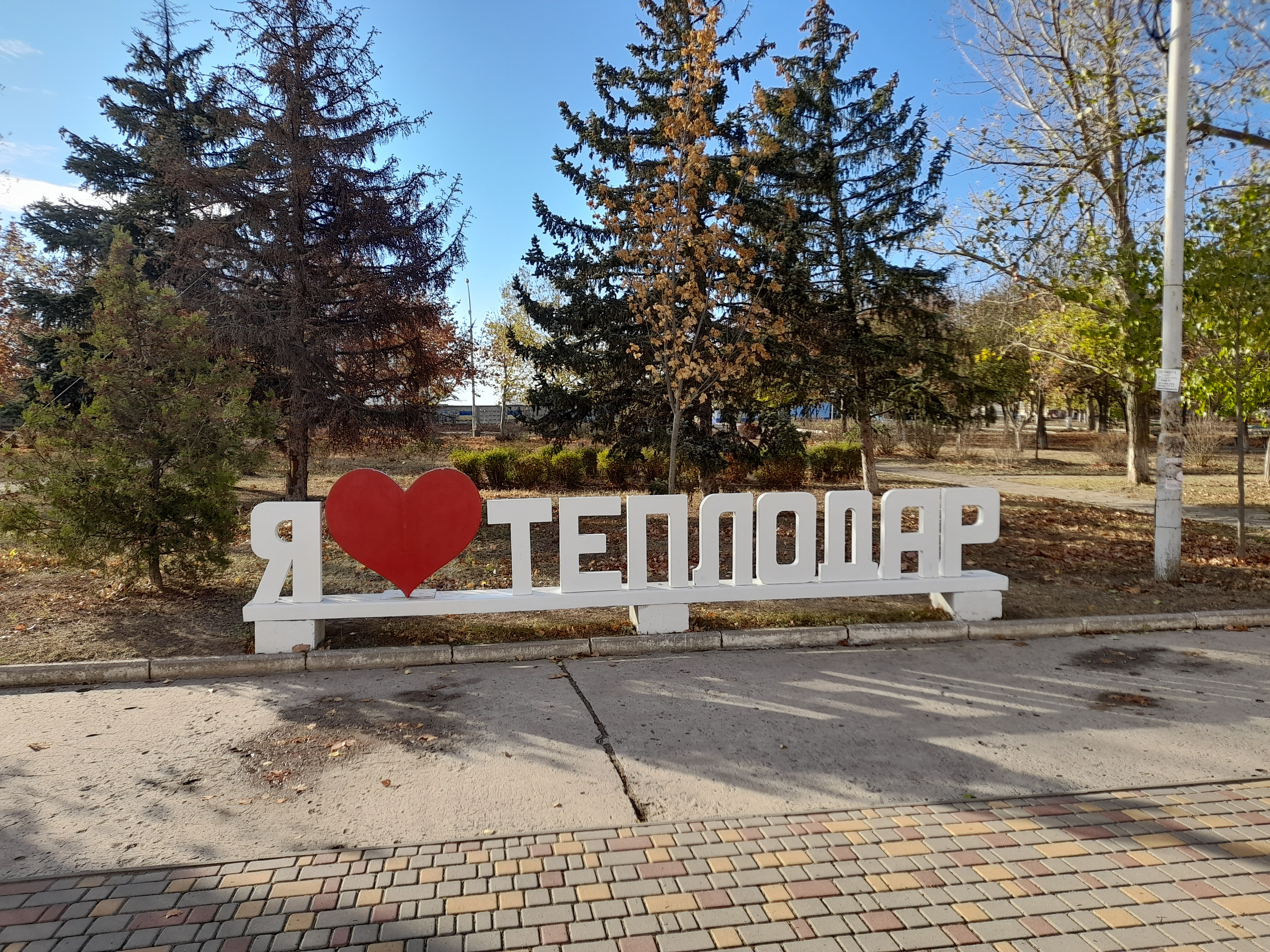
- In the City Garden

- Flag Coat of arms

- Location within Odesa Oblast Location within Ukraine
- Coordinates: 46°30′13″N 30°19′28″E
- Country: Ukraine
- Oblast: Odesa Oblast
- Raion: Odesa Raion
- Hromada: Teplodar urban hromada

Area
  - Total: 3.0 km^{2} (1.2 sq mi)
- Elevation: 37 m (121 ft)

Population (2022)
  - Total: 9,958
- Time zone: UTC+2 (EET)
  - Summer (DST): UTC+3 (EEST)
- Postal code: 65490—495
- Area code: +380 48502
- Climate: Cfb
- Website: teplodar.biz.ua

Teplodar (Ukrainian: Теплодар, pronounced [teploˈdɑr]) is a city and municipality in Odesa Oblast, Ukraine. It is located in Odesa Raion and hosts the administration of Teplodar urban hromada, one of the hromadas of Ukraine. Population: 9,958 (2022 estimate). In 2001, the population was 8,830.

== History ==
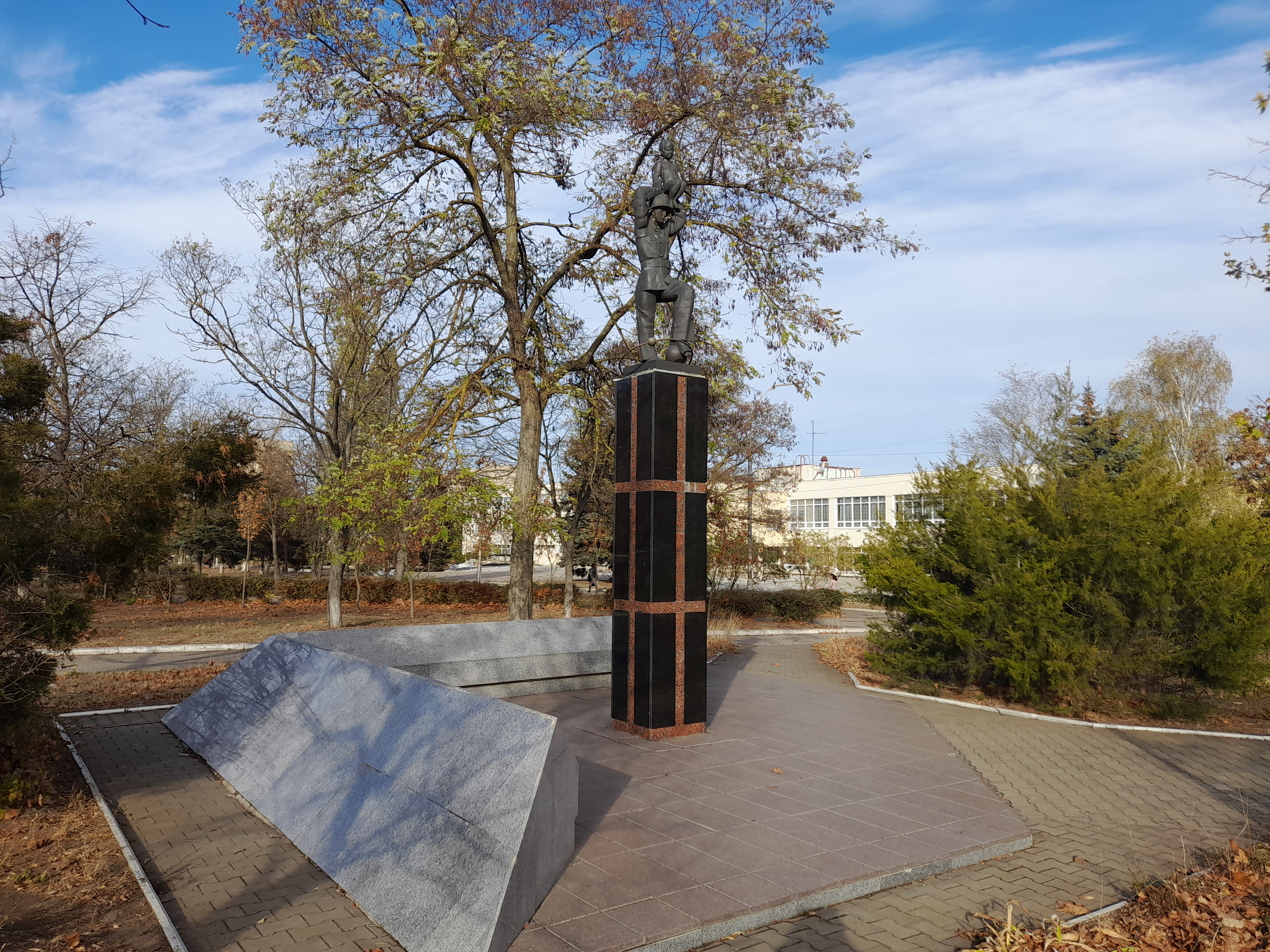
Chernobyl disaster memorial

The city of Teplodar was founded on 15 May 1981. The intent of the city was to provide housing for the workers of an atomic thermal power station very close to the city which would provide power for Odesa. The development of the city was halted in 1986 after the Chernobyl disaster. In 1997 the construction of the station was completely canceled.

Until 18 July 2020, Teplodar was incorporated as a city of oblast significance. In July 2020, as part of the administrative reform of Ukraine, which reduced the number of raions of Odesa Oblast to seven, the city of Teplodar was merged into newly established Odesa Raion.

The city is located next to Baraboi Reservoir located along the Baraboi River (Black Sea).

== Demographics ==
As of the 2001 Ukrainian census, Teplodar had 9,036 inhabitants. The exact distribution of the population by ethnicity was:

Ethnic composition of Teplodar
	percent
Ukrainians	68.49%
Russians	25.70%
Moldovans	1.75%
Bulgarians	1.15%
Belarusians	1.03%
Armenians	0.20%
Gagauz	0.18%

== See also ==
- Odesa Nuclear Power Plant
