= Chyhyryn Nuclear Power Plant =

Unfinished nuclear power plant in Ukraine

Coordinates: 49.08472°N 32.78528°E

Chyhyryn Nuclear Power Station (Ukrainian: Чигиринська АЕС) is an unfinished nuclear power plant located to the east of Chyhyryn in Ukraine, on the territory adjacent to the Kremenchuk Reservoir shore, between the villages Stetsivka and Vitove.

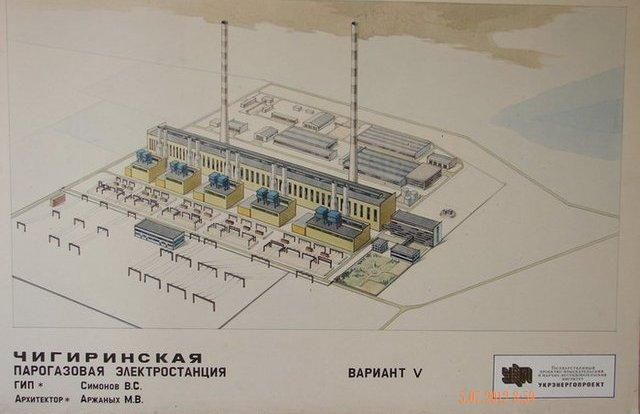
Plan of Chigirinskaya PGPP fossil fuel power station

== History ==
The Chyhyryn Nuclear Power Plant was originally intended to be a fossil fuel power plant, with a capacity of 4.8 MW. The plan to build the Chyhyryn fossil fuel power station was adopted by the Central Committee of the Communist Party of Ukraine in 1970. It was also planned to build a new modern city to house the station workers, with space for 20 thousand inhabitants. In 1981, after repeated project changes, the construction was halted.

In 1982, the Kyiv branch of the Institute "Atomteploelektroproekt" developed a technical and economic conclusion of the construction of a nuclear power plant near Chyhyryn, and in 1983, the Ministry of Energy of the USSR approved this conclusion, and it was decided on the banks of the Dnieper River to build the nuclear power plant.

According to the decision of the Central Committee of the CPSU and the Council of Ministers of the USSR of September 21, 1984, "On Additional Measures to Ensure Accelerated Development of Nuclear Power Engineering", it was envisaged the construction of a nuclear power plant at Chigirinskaya site with a capacity of 4000 MW. The order of the Ministry of Energy of the USSR No. 539 dated August 23, 1985 was organized by the Chigirinskaya NPP.

Construction work was carried out until 1989, when under public pressure after the Chernobyl Accident, it was decided to stop construction. The point was set by the Resolution of the Council of Ministers of the USSR on May 19, 1989 "On the Termination of the Construction of the Chyhyryn NPP".

Now the complex of the unfinished nuclear power plant together with the town of power engineers Orbita are abandoned ruins. Empty 9-storey residential buildings, administrative buildings, shops and other infrastructure have been preserved.

== Possibility of construction restoration ==
In 2005, on August 5, Minister of Fuel and Energy of Ukraine Ivan Plachkov officially announced the possibility of restoration of the construction of the Chyhyryn NPP. But by 2010, no restoration of construction had taken place. By 2011, the territory of the boiler house was protected by Cherkasyoblenergo. In 2011, the security was removed, and all boiler rooms were demolished, only the chimney of the boiler house remained intact.

On May 16, 2022, Energoatom CEO Petro Kotin announced that a contract had been signed with Westinghouse to build five AP1000 reactors in Ukraine. Two reactors will be constructed at the Khmelnytskyi Nuclear Power Plant, with the Chyhyryn site being a contender to receive at least two reactors. Construction is planned to begin once the 2022 Russian invasion of Ukraine has concluded. In 2024, Energoatom announced that it had acquired land for a four-unit plant.

== See also ==
- Nuclear power in Ukraine
