= Ülken =

Ülken Үлкен
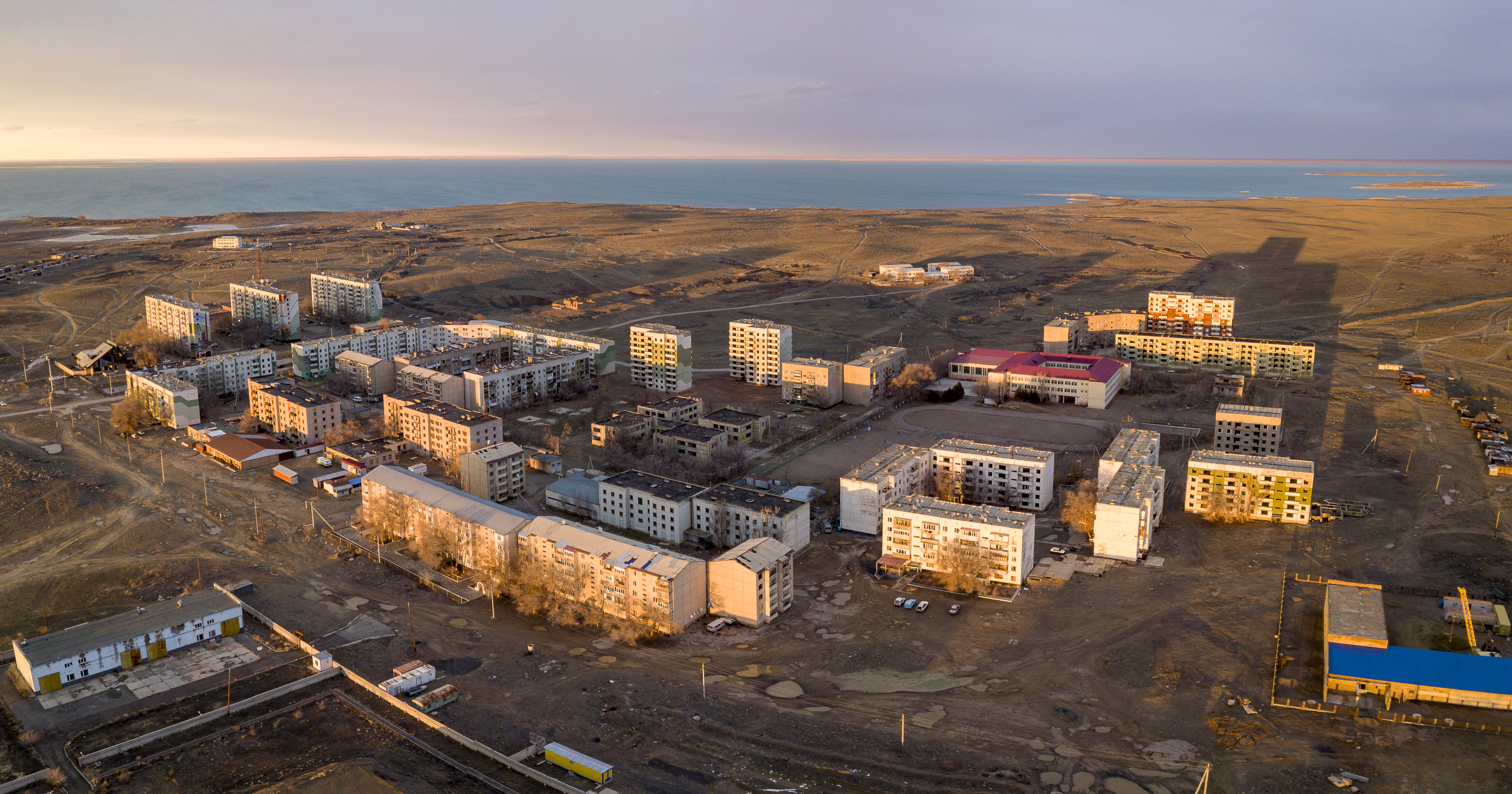

- Location in Kazakhstan
- Coordinates: 45°12′18″N 73°58′53″E
- Country: Kazakhstan
- Region: Almaty
- District: Jambyl

Population
  - Total: 1,673 (2,024)

Ülken (Kazakh: Үлкен, [ylˈkʲen], lit. 'big'; Russian: Улькен) is a village in the Jambyl District of Almaty Region, Kazakhstan and the administrative center of the Ülken rural district.

Before 2013, Ülken was classified as an urban-type settlement.

== History ==
The settlement was founded in 1984 in connection with the proposed construction of the South Kazakhstan State District Power Plant (YUKGRES), which was never carried out. In 1986, the settlement was transferred from the Moiynkum District of the Dzhambul Region to the Kürti District of the Alma-Ata Region, giving the name Ülken and classifying it as a "working settlement". In 1997, at the proposal of the President of the Nuclear Society of Kazakhstan Vladimir Shkolnik, it was decided to use the site for the construction of a nuclear power plant, but protests from environmentalists and residents of the area again forced the plans to be reconsidered, and at the end of 2008, the Government decided to build the Balkhash Thermal Power Plant (BTPP). Preparations for the construction of the BTPP began in 2013, but were suspended sometime later. In the first half of 2016, some materials were delivered to the construction site, and the construction site was also prepared, after which activity stopped again.

In the early 2020s, the government once again proposed that a nuclear power plant be built in Ülken. A large portion of the local residents protested against the proposal in August 2023. Most of the ones opposing, including Kazakh ecologists, are troubled about the already worryingly low levels of the Balkhash Lake, which is a major food and income source for the settlement. In June 2023, President Kassym-Jomart Tokayev announced that a referendum on the construction of the nuclear power plant would take place in the autumn of 2024. It was approved by the electorate according to official statistics.

== Population ==
According to the 1989 census, 3,977 people lived in the village (2,047 men and 1,930 women).

In 1999, the population of the village was 3,106 people (1,538 men and 1,568 women). According to the 2009 census, 1,682 people lived in the village (813 men and 869 women).

== Infrastructure ==
In August 2023, Radio Liberty reported that the village lacked proper roads, employment, and a hospital. The absence of a local hospital especially worries the local populace, as ill people are forced to drive to Priozyorsk, Karaganda Region, which is 126 kilometres (78 mi) away. The city administration (akimat) lacks an official building, and the äkim and his apparatus operate in a rented three-roomed flat.
