= Odesa Nuclear Power Plant =

Unfinished nuclear power plant in Ukraine

Coordinates: 46.464°N 30.318°E

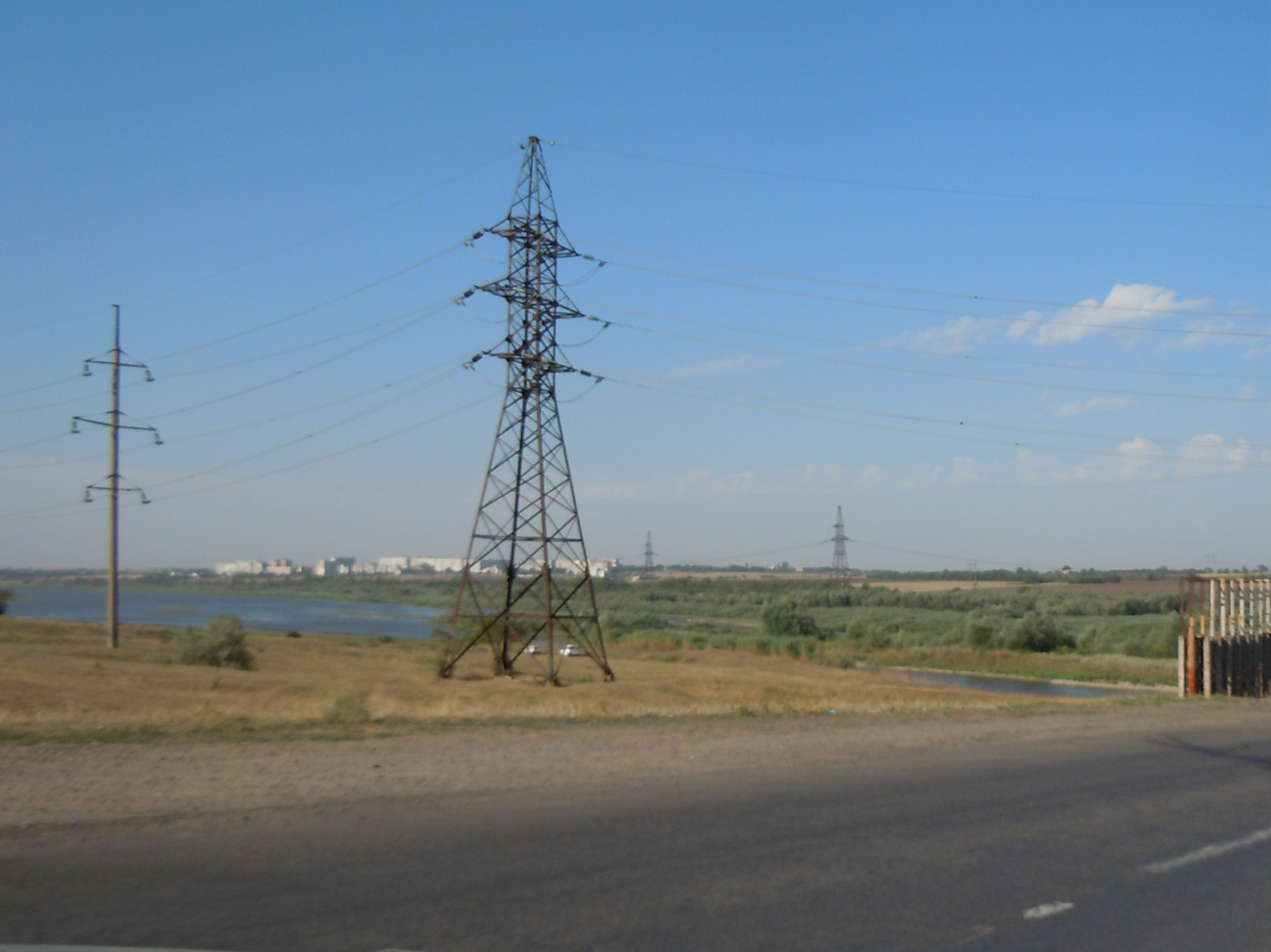
Baraboy Reservoir, at the site of the unfinished plant

The Odesa Nuclear Power Station (Ukrainian: Одеська АТЕЦ) is an unfinished nuclear power plant (nuclear power central), located near the city of Teplodar, Odesa Oblast of Ukraine, near the Baraboyske reservoir, 25 km west of Odesa. Two power units with VVER-1000 reactors were supposed to produce electricity for the Odesa Oblast, as well as to provide heat to Odesa, Chornomorsk and Teplodar itself. Planned electrical power of the station is 2000 MW, heat is 6000 MW.

== History ==
The city of Teplodar, as well as the Nuclear Cogeneration Station, began to be built in the early 1980s. After the accident at the Chornobyl Nuclear Power Plant construction of the Odesa NCS has been stopped.

== Possibility of construction restoration ==
National Nuclear Power Generating Company Energoatom (NNEGC "Energoatom") is holding discussions on the restoration of the construction of the APEC.

== See also ==
- Nuclear power in Ukraine
