= Orbita, Cherkasy Oblast =

Orbita Орбіта
- Settlement
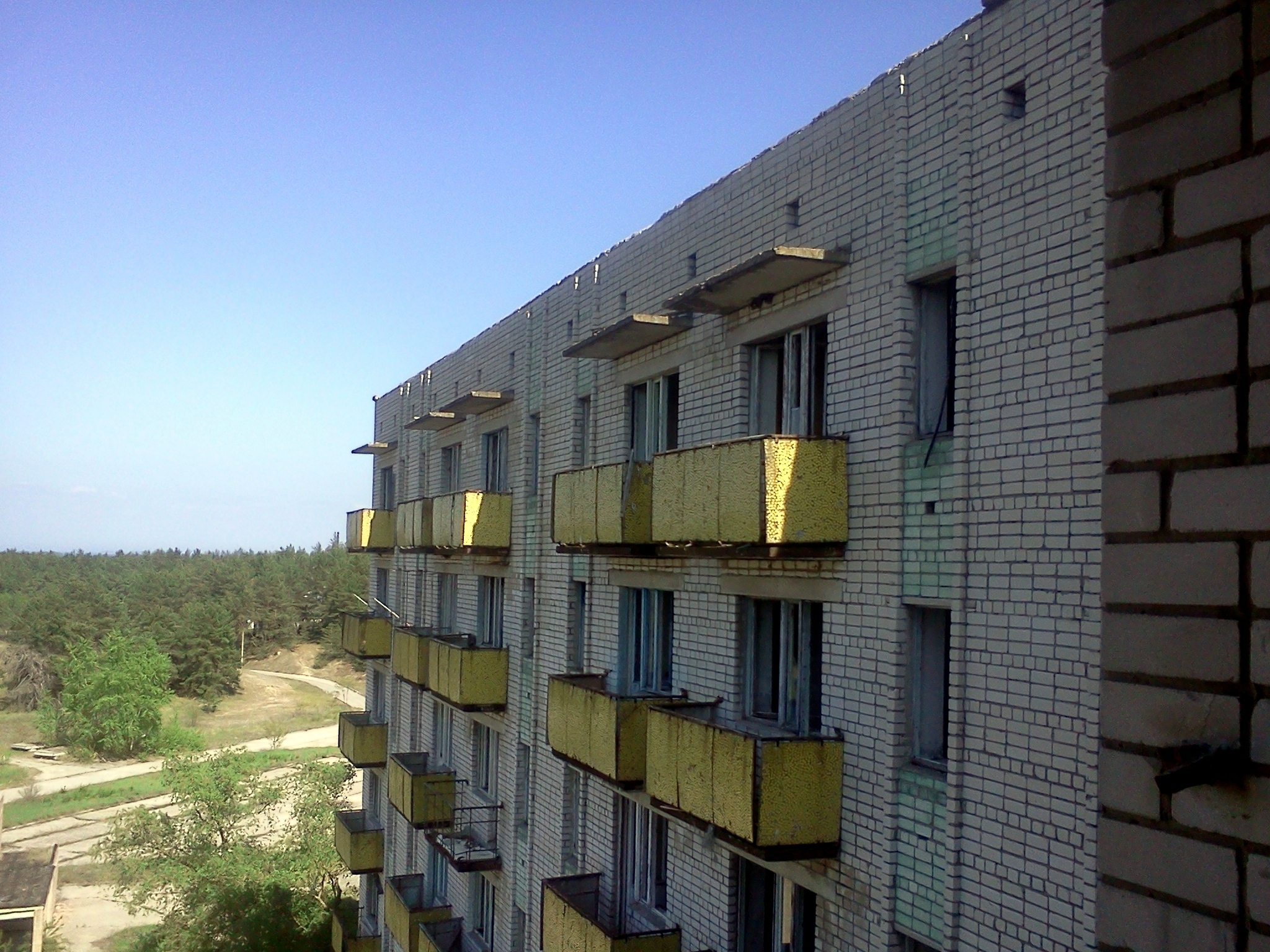

- Location within Cherkasy Oblast
- Coordinates: 49°05.089′N 32°46.209′E
- Country: Ukraine
- Oblast: Cherkasy Oblast
- Raion: Cherkasy Raion
- Hromada: Chyhyryn urban hromada

Population
  - Total: 120

Orbita (Ukrainian: Орбіта) is a settlement in Cherkasy Oblast (province) of Ukraine. It was originally designed to become a satellite town of a planned nuclear power station. While the construction was officially cancelled before fall of the Soviet Union, it nevertheless has a population of 120.

The populated place was built for builders of the Chyhyryn Nuclear Power Plant, but due to the Chernobyl disaster construction was suspended and later ceased. As any other atomgrads of the Soviet Union, the populated place carried a status of closed city. Before the Chernobyl disaster in the prospective city was finished and settled few neighborhoods.

Most of the buildings are nine-story houses, but only two five-story buildings are inhabited.

In the 2000s, the only one heating pipeline in the city stopped heating houses. Only a few houses have gas.

Following the dissolution of the Soviet Union, the semi-finished city was placed in administration of neighboring rural council (village) of Vitove, Chyhyryn Raion (since 2020 Cherkasy Raion).

In January 2023, the Ukrainian ministry approved a plan to finish the construction of the Chyhyryn NPP and renovating existing homes. Construction would commence between 2032 and 2040.

== See also ==
- Chyhyryn Nuclear Power Plant
