= Birky, Kharkiv Raion, Kharkiv Oblast =

Rural locality in Kharkiv Oblast, Ukraine

Birky Борки
- Rural settlement
- Location within Kharkiv Oblast
- Coordinates: 49°41′10″N 36°03′13″E
- Country: Ukraine
- Oblast: Kharkiv Oblast
- Raion: Kharkiv Raion

Population (2022)
  - Total: 521
- Time zone: UTC+2 (EET)
  - Summer (DST): UTC+3 (EEST)

Birky (Ukrainian: Бірки, Russian: Борки) is a rural settlement in Kharkiv Raion of Kharkiv Oblast in Ukraine. It is located approximately 30 kilometres (19 mi) southwest of the city of Kharkiv. Birky belongs to Nova Vodolaha settlement hromada, one of the hromadas of Ukraine. Population: 521 (2022 estimate).

== History ==
The settlement was established by Ukrainian Cossacks in 1659.

Until 18 July 2020, Birky belonged to Nova Vodolaha Raion. The raion was abolished in July 2020 as part of the administrative reform of Ukraine, which reduced the number of raions of Kharkiv Oblast to seven. The area of Nova Vodolaha Raion was split between Kharkiv and Krasnohrad Raions, with Birky being transferred to Kharkiv Raion.

Until 26 January 2024, Birky was designated an urban-type settlement. On this day, a new law entered into force which abolished this status, and Birky became a rural settlement.

== Economy ==
=== Transportation ===
Birky railway station is located 3 kilometres (1.9 mi) north of the settlement, on the railway connecting Kharkiv with Lozova. There is some passenger traffic.

The settlement has access to Highway M18 and Highway M20 which connect Kharkiv with Dnipro, as well as to roads running to Lozova and Izium.
