= Texas v. NRC =

Ongoing lawsuit against the US Nuclear Regulatory Commission

State of Texas v. Nuclear Regulatory Commission
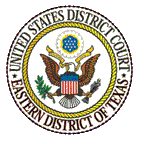
- Court: United States District Court for the Eastern District of Texas
- Full case name: State of Texas et al v. U.S. Nuclear Regulatory Commission

Court membership
- Judge sitting: Jeremy Kernodle

State of Texas v. Nuclear Regulatory Commission (Docket No. 6:24-cv-00507) is a pending case in the United States District Court for the Eastern District of Texas, challenging the authority of the US Nuclear Regulatory Commission to regulate small modular reactors. The lawsuit was filed by the states of Texas, Utah, and Louisiana, as well as reactor developers Last Energy, Valar Atomics, and Deep Fission.

== Background ==
The Atomic Energy Act of 1954 empowered the United States Atomic Energy Commission (AEC) as the sole regulator with the authority to regulate the safety of nuclear reactors. The Act allowed the AEC to require licenses for facilities, "capable of making use of special nuclear material in such quantity as to be of significance to the common defense and security, or in such manner as to affect the health and safety of the public". When the AEC was dissolved in 1974, its regulatory authority was inherited by the Nuclear Regulatory Commission (NRC) under the Energy Reorganization Act of 1974.

Under the Utilization Facility Rule, instituted in 1956, the NRC requires all nuclear reactors in the United States to obtain construction and operating licenses, regardless of size. Small modular reactors (SMRs) are modular nuclear power plants producing less than 300 MW of electricity, while microreactors are compact, transportable reactors that produce less than 10 MW. Both microreactors and SMRs are typically considered safer than the older, large reactors commonly used for commercial power generation.

The NRC's regulations, and their associated costs, have attracted criticism from the nuclear industry for being slow and inefficient. The Nuclear Energy Innovation and Modernization Act of 2019 and the ADVANCE Act of 2024 both instructed the NRC to streamline its procedures, and create a new licensing process for small reactors using diverse technologies. In 2023, the agency began rulemaking for a more flexible "technology-inclusive" regulatory framework (10 CFR Part 53).

== Proceedings ==
Texas, Utah, and SMR developer Last Energy filed suit on December 30, 2024, alleging that the NRC was overstepping its authority under the Atomic Energy Act. The plaintiffs argued that SMRs, microreactors, and research reactors are of such low consequence that the NRC's regulations exceed its authority and regulatory control should be given to the states. They asked the court to set aside the rule for "small, non-hazardous reactors", and to exempt research reactors and Last Energy's SMR design from the licensing requirements. On January 2, 2025, the case was assigned to District Judge Jeremy Kernodle. Soon after, the states of Florida and Louisiana, reactor developers Valar Atomics and Deep Fission, Inc., and the Arizona State Legislature joined the lawsuit.

In response, the NRC argued that the lawsuit was frivolous and violated civil procedure rules, and filed a motion to dismiss. Representing the NRC, the Department of Justice also argued that since the ADVANCE Act had explicitly instructed the NRC to develop regulations for microreactors, Congress had already acknowledged its jurisdiction. However, appointees of the Trump Administration pushed for the agency to compromise. In June 2025, the NRC joined with the plaintiffs to ask for a stay on the case to pursue a settlement. According to E&E News, DOGE staffer Adam Blake had met with NRC commissioners and staff the previous month. A staff member who was present stated that Blake believed it was part of his mandate to facilitate a settlement between the parties. The NRC lawyer who had been working on the case left the agency, according to ProPublica.

As of September 2, 2026, the states had dropped out of the lawsuit, while the three reactor developers (Valar Atomics, Last Energy, and Deep Fission) were conferring on their next steps. According to a joint status report, the three developers and the NRC were discussing the terms of a potential settlement. On September 29, 2026, Valar Atomics CEO Isaiah Taylor stated that the NRC had "been told to settle with us".

== Reactions ==
Several organizations within the nuclear industry criticized the lawsuit, arguing it would stifle the deployment of nuclear power plants. Adam Stein, the Nuclear Energy Innovation director of the Breakthrough Institute, argued that even with state-level regulation, the NRC would still need to evaluate designs to determine if they are safe enough to hand off to state regulators. Judi Greenwald, the CEO of the Nuclear Innovation Alliance, said, "A patchwork of state-level oversight would hinder the commercialization of new reactors at home and abroad...It would also be very expensive and inefficient to have states attempt to duplicate NRC's highly technical expertise". E&E News reported that an established SMR company, speaking anonymously "due to fear of political retribution", echoed these concerns and defended the NRC. The company stated that, "A patchwork regulatory environment with inconsistent codes from state to state would present a challenge to developers and reduce efficiency at a time when we should be expediting processes".
