= List of small modular reactor designs =

Small modular reactors (SMR) are much smaller than the current nuclear reactors (300 MWe or less) and have compact and scalable designs which propose to offer safety, construction, and economic benefits, and offering potential for lower initial capital investment and scalability.

== Summary table ==
Legend
Designed or under design	Seeking license	Licensed in one or more countries	Licensed and under construction
Operational	Canceled	Retired	

The stated power refers to the capacity of one reactor unless specified otherwise.

List of small nuclear reactor designs
Name	Plant gross power (MW_{e})	Type	Producer	Country	Status
4S	10–50	SFR	Toshiba	Japan	Design (Detailed)
Aalo Pod	10 (x5)	SGR	Aalo Atomics	United States	Experimental reactor under construction at INL. Graphite moderator, water and sodium cooling.
ACP100 Linglong One	125	PWR	China National Nuclear Corporation	China	Under construction
ACP100S	300	PWR	China National Nuclear Corporation	China	Feasibility study of demonstration project finished
ACR300	300	PWR	INVAP	Argentina	Design (Detailed)
Advanced Micro Reactor – AMR	3	HTGR	STL Nuclear	South Africa	Design (Pre-conceptual)
AP300	300	PWR	Westinghouse Electric Company	United States	Design (Detailed)
ARC-100	100	SFR	ARC Nuclear	Canada	Design (Vendor Review)
ANGSTREM	6	LFR	OKB Gidropress	Russia	Design (Conceptual)
Aurora	75	SFR	Oklo Inc.	United States	First reactor under construction at INL.
B&W mPower	195	PWR	Babcock & Wilcox	United States	Cancelled
BANDI-60	60	PWR	KEPCO	South Korea	Design (Detailed)
BLUE CAPSULE	50	SGR	Blue Capsule Technology	France	Preliminary studies
BREST-OD-300	300	LFR	Atomenergoprom	Russia	Under construction
BWRX-300	300	BWR	GE Vernova Hitachi Nuclear Energy	United States/Japan	Four units are licensed in Ontario as the Darlington New Nuclear Project. At least one unit under construction.
CALOGENA	30	PWR	Calogena S.A.	France	Design (Conceptual)
CANDU SMR	300	PHWR	Candu Energy Inc.	Canada	Design (Conceptual)
CAP200	>200	PWR	SPIC	China	Design (Completion)
CAREM	27–30	PWR	CNEA	Argentina	Seeking ARC approval for 30 MWe test SMR. Foundational construction now halted.
CMSR	110	MSR	Seaborg Technologies	Denmark	
Copenhagen Atomics Waste Burner	20	MSR	Copenhagen Atomics	Denmark	Design (Conceptual)
DHR400	400 (non-electric)	PWR	CNCC	China	Design (Conceptual)
EAGL-1	240	LFR	First American Nuclear	United States	Design (Detailed)
ELENA	0.068	PWR	Kurchatov Institute	Russia	Design (Conceptual)
Energy Multiplier Module (EM^{2})	265 (×4)	GFR	General Atomics	United States	Pre-conceptual design complete
Energy Well	8.4	MSR	Centrum výzkumu Řež	Czechia	Design (Conceptual)
eVinci	5	HPR	Westinghouse Electric Company	United States	Design (Pre-licensing communications with the US NRC initiated.)
Fast Modular Reactor (FMR)	44	GFR	General Atomics	United States	Design (Conceptual)
FLEX Reactor	24	MSR	MoltexFLEX, Ltd.	United Kingdom	Design (Conceptual)
Flexblue	160	PWR	Areva TA / DCNS group	France	Design (Conceptual)
Fuji MSR	200	MSR	International Thorium Molten Salt Forum (ITMSF)	Japan	Design (Conceptual)
GTHTR300	100~300	HTGR	JAEA-led	Japan	Design (Conceptual)
GT-MHR	285	HTGR	OKBM Afrikantov	Russia	Design (Completed)
G4M	25	LFR	Gen4 Energy	United States	Cancelled (Company ceased trading)
GT-MHR	50	HTGR	General Atomics, Framatome	United States/France	Design (Conceptual)
HAPPY200	200 MWt	PWR	SPIC	China	Design (Conceptual)
HEXANA	150 (x2)	SFR	Hexana	France	Preliminary studies
HOLOS-QUAD	10	HTGR	HolosGen	United States	Developed detailed step-by-step installation procedure
HOLOS-MONO	10	HTGR	HolosGen	United States	Developed detailed step-by-step installation procedure
HTGR-POLA	11.5	HTGR	National Centre for Nuclear Research (NCBJ)	Poland	Design (Conceptual)
HTMR-100	35	HTGR	Stratek Global	South Africa	Design (Conceptual)
HTR-10	2.5	HTGR	Tsinghua University	China	Restart
HTR-PM	210 (2 reactors one turbine)	HTGR	China Huaneng	China	Operational (Two reactors. Station connected to the grid in December 2021.)
HTR50	17.2	HTGR	JAEA	Japan	Monolithic fuel element specimen irradiation test
HTTR	-	HTGR	JAEA	Japan	Safety demonstration test
IMSR400	195	MSR	Terrestrial Energy	Canada	Design (Detailed) for 98 MWe (per mod), 2 module SMR
IRIS	335	PWR	Westinghouse-led	International	Design (Conceptual)
i-SMR	170	PWR	Innovative Small Modular Reactor Development Agency (KHNP and KAERI)	South Korea	Design (Conceptual)
JIMMY		HTGR	JIMMY ENERGY	France	Design (Basic)
Kaleidos	1	HTGR	Radiant Nuclear	United States	Design (Detailed), test reactor under construction.
KLT-40S Akademik Lomonosov	70	PWR	OKBM Afrikantov	Russia	Operational May 2020 (floating plant)
KP-FHR	140	FHR	Kairos Power	United States	Design (Detailed), two test reactors under construction.
LFR-AS-200	200	LFR	NewCleo	Italy/France	Design (Conceptual)
Lithium Fluoride Thorium Reactor	250	MSR	Flibe Energy	United States	Design (Conceptual)
MARVEL Research Microreactor		LMR	Idaho National Laboratory	United States	Demonstration test bed
MMR	5–15	HTGR	Ultra Safe Nuclear Corporation purchased by NANO Nuclear Energy	United States/Canada	Company filed for Chapter 11 bankruptcy. Had been seeking licensing. Design acquired by Nano Nuclear Energy, who renamed the design KRONOS MMR. Applied for an NRC construction permit to build one unit at the University of Illinois Urbana-Champaign.
MHR-100	25–87	HTGR	OKBM Afrikantov	Russia	Design (Conceptual)
MHR-T (Note: Multi-unit complex based on the GT-MHR reactor design)	205.5 (x4)	HTGR	OKBM Afrikantov	Russia	Design (Conceptual)
MoveluX	3~4	HPR	Toshiba Energy Systems & Solutions	Japan	
MRX	30–100	PWR	JAERI	Japan	Design (Conceptual)
NOVA Core		HTGR	Valar Atomics	United States	Design (Working prototype). Design achieved cold criticality state at LANL on 18 November 2025.
NP-300	100–300	PWR	Areva TA	France	Design (Conceptual)
NuScale Power Module	77	PWR	NuScale Power	United States	Received NRC Standard Design Certification in 2025. 50 MW version certified in 2023.
Nuward	unknown	PWR	consortium	France	Design (Conceptual). In July 2024, existing design discontinued for a simpler redesign.
OPEN100	100	PWR	Energy Impact Center	United States	Design (Conceptual)
PBMR	165	HTGR	Eskom	South Africa	Cancelled – demonstration plant postponed indefinitely
PeLUIt-40	10	HTGR	BRIN, ITB	Indonesia	Design (Conceptual)
PWR-20	20	PWR	Last Energy	United States	Design (Conceptual)
Pylon D1		HTGR	Ultra Safe Nuclear Corporation	United States	Design (Pre-conceptual)
RITM-200N	55	PWR	OKBM Afrikantov	Russia	Under construction
RITM-200S	106	PWR	OKBM Afrikantov	Russia	Under construction
Rolls-Royce SMR	470	PWR	Rolls-Royce	United Kingdom	Seeking UK GDA licensing in April 2022 In final stage 3 of assessment
Stable Salt Reactor Wasteburner	300~900	MSR (Static Fuelled)	Moltex Energy	Canada, United Kingdom	
SEALER	55	LFR	Blykalla	Sweden	Design
SHELF-M	10	PWR	NIKIET	Russia	Design
SMART100	110	PWR	KAERI	South Korea	Licensed in Korea (standard design approval)
SMR-160	160	PWR	Holtec International	United States	US NRC pre-application suspended in favor of SMR-300 design
SMR-300	300	PWR	Holtec International	United States	Applied for an NRC construction permit for two units at Palisades. Seeking UK Generic Design Assessment.
SVBR-100	100	LFR	OKB Gidropress	Russia	Design (Detailed)
SSR-W	300–1000	MSR	Moltex Energy	Canada	Design (Phase 1, vendor design review).
STAR	10	PWR	STAR ENERGY SA	Switzerland	Design (Detailed)
Stellarium	110	MSR	Stellaria	France	Pre-conceptual design
S-PRISM	311	SFR	GE Vernova Hitachi Nuclear Energy	United States/Japan	Design (Detailed)
Natrium	345	SFR	TerraPower	United States	Under construction as Kemmerer Unit 1.
Thorcon TMSR-500	500	MSR	ThorCon	Indonesia	Design (Conceptual)
THORIZON	100	Modular core fast-spectrum reactor with chloride salt	THORIZON	Netherlands	Pre-conceptual design
U-Battery	4	HTGR	U-Battery consortium (Note: Urenco Group in collaboration with Jacobs and Kinectrics)	United Kingdom	Cancelled. Design archived.
VBER-300	325	PWR	OKBM Afrikantov	Russia	Design
VK-300	250	BWR	Atomstroyexport	Russia	Design (Detailed)
VVER-300	300	BWR	OKB Gidropress	Russia	Design (Conceptual)
Westinghouse SMR	225	PWR	Westinghouse Electric Company	United States	Cancelled. Preliminary design completed.
Xe-100	80	HTGR	X-energy	United States	Applied for an NRC construction permit to build a four-module plant with Dow Chemical Company.
Updated as of 2022. Some reactors are not included in IAEA Report. Not all IAEA reactors are listed in this table. Some were added (anno 2023) that were not yet listed in the now dated IAEA report. However, new manufacturers are being added as news reports and NRC information becomes available.

== Reactor designs ==
=== ACP100: China ===
In 2021, construction of the ACP100 was started at the Changjiang Nuclear Power Plant site in Hainan province. Previously, in July 2019 CNNC announced it would start building a demonstration ACP100 SMR by the end of the year. Design of the ACP100 started in 2010 and it became the first SMR project of its kind to be approved by the International Atomic Energy Agency in 2016. It is a fully integrated reactor module with an internal coolant system, with a two-year refuelling interval, producing 385 MWt and about 125 MWe. The 125 MWe pressurised water reactor (PWR) is also referred to as the Linglong One and is designed for multiple purposes including electricity production, heating, steam production or seawater desalination.

=== ARC-100: US/Japan ===
The ARC-100 is a 100 MWe sodium cooled, fast-flux, pool-type reactor with metallic fuel based on the 30-year successful operation of the Experimental Breeder Reactor II in Idaho. ARC Nuclear is developing this reactor in Canada, in partnership with GE Vernova Hitachi Nuclear Energy, with the intent of complementing existing CANDU facilities.

=== Bharat Small Reactor: India ===
India announced in 2024 their intention to develop an SMR design called the Bharat Small Modular Reactor.

=== CAREM: Argentina ===
CAREM reactor logo

Developed by the Argentine National Atomic Energy Commission (CNEA) & INVAP, CAREM is a simplified pressurized water reactor (PWR) designed to have electrical output of 100 MW or 25 MW. It is an integral reactor – the primary system coolant circuit is fully contained within the reactor vessel.

The fuel is uranium oxide with an enrichment of 3.4%. The primary coolant system uses natural circulation, so there are no pumps required, which provides inherent safety against core meltdown, even in accident situations. The integral design also minimizes the risk of loss-of-coolant accidents (LOCA). Annual refueling is required. Currently, the first reactor of the type is being built near the city of Zárate, in the northern part of Buenos Aires province.

=== Copenhagen Atomics: Denmark ===
The Copenhagen Atomics Waste Burner is designed by Copenhagen Atomics, a Danish molten-salt technology company. The Waste Burner would be a 100 MW_{th} heavy water-moderated molten-salt reactor. The Waste Burner is intended to burn transuranic waste products, while simultaneously breeding ^{233}U from a thorium blanket. It would use FLiBe fuel salt, with a ^{7}LiF_{4}-ThF_{4} salt blanket. ^{233}U bred from the blanket would be transferred to the fuel salt continuously during reactor operation. Its heavy water moderator is unpressurized and thermally insulated from the molten fuel salt. The heavy water is constantly circulated to keep it at room temperature. Reactivity control would primarily be accomplished by varying the heavy water level, while the reactor's negative temperature coefficient of reactivity would be used as a secondary control mechanism. The reactor core contains three spherical layers of fuel salt, moderator, and blanket, and is referred to by the company as the "Onion Core".

The Waste Burner would utilize the thorium fuel cycle, using plutonium and transuranic waste from spent nuclear fuel as the initial fissile load, and breeding ^{233}U during operation. The reactor would require online fission product removal, and a composite core vessel, to achieve breeding. As of 2025, the reactor prototype would use a stainless steel core vessel, with only gaseous fission products removed, while later iterations would use a carbon or silicon carbide vessel.

The reactor is intended to operate autonomously, without human intervention or maintenance, for a five-year design lifetime. As a passive safety feature, the moderator and salt loops are continuously drained from the reactor, and require active pumps to keep them inside the core. If power is lost, or any pump shuts off, the loss of any of these fluids from the core would shut down the reaction. The reactor core, salt loops, moderator loop, pumps, heat exchangers, and steel containment vessel would fit inside a standard 40-foot container, which would itself be placed inside a leak-tight steel "cocoon" containing auxiliary systems. The reactor would not contain a power conversion system; Copenhagen Atomics intends to deliver "heat as a service", with molten nitrate salt transferring heat from the reactor to a customer's desired usage.

Copenhagen Atomics was founded in 2015, and in 2016 was part of MIMOSA, a European nuclear molten salt research consortium. In 2022, the company finished a full-scale water-based test platform. In 2023 a full-scale non-nuclear prototype was built to test the entire system with non-radioactive molten salts. According to the company, it is pursuing an iterative, hardware-driven approach to development, and is developing and testing pumps and other components for molten salt applications. The company has also developed a canned molten salt pump; in February 2026, the molten salt pump completed two years of continuous test operation under high-temperature conditions. Copenhagen Atomics offers some of their technologies for sale commercially, including molten salt test loops and purified salt.

In July 2024, Copenhagen Atomics and the Paul Scherrer Institute (PSI) in Switzerland started a collaboration to build Copenhagen Atomics' first 1 MW_{th} test reactor at PSI. In July 2024, Copenhagen Atomics announced that their prototype reactors are ready to be tested in a real life scenario, in a critical experiment at the Paul Scherrer Institute in Switzerland. Tests were originally planned to begin in 2026-27; as of 2026 PSI expects the reactor to be operational no earlier than 2028. The company expects commercial deployment to be in 2030–2031.

In September 2026, Turkey's Ministry of Energy and Natural Resources made an agreement with Copenhagen Atomics to jointly develop the use of thorium in nuclear technology, aiming to develop domestic production of thorium compounds. Turkey has large reserves of thorium, as of 2026 the sixth largest of identified global thorium resources.

=== Encapsulated Nuclear Heat Source (ENHS): United States ===
ENHS is a liquid metal reactor (LMR) that uses lead (Pb) or lead–bismuth (Pb–Bi) coolant. Pb has a higher boiling point than the other commonly used coolant metal, sodium, and is chemically inert with air and water. The difficulty is finding structural materials that will be compatible with the Pb or Pb–Bi coolant, especially at high temperatures. The ENHS uses natural circulation for the coolant and the turbine steam, eliminating the need for pumps. It is also designed with autonomous control, with a load-following power generation design, and a thermal-to-electrical efficiency of more than 42%. The fuel is either U–Zr or U–Pu–Zr, and can keep the reactor at full power for 15 years before needing to be refueled, with either ^{239}Pu at 11% or ^{235}U at 13%

It requires on-site storage, at least until it cools enough that the coolant solidifies, making it very resistant to proliferation. However, the reactor vessel weighs 300 tons with the coolant inside, and that can pose some transportation difficulties.

=== Flibe Energy: United States ===
Flibe Energy is a US-based company established to design, construct and operate small modular reactors based on liquid fluoride thorium reactor (LFTR) technology (a type of molten salt reactor). The name "Flibe" comes from FLiBe, a Fluoride salt of Lithium and Beryllium, used in LFTRs. Initially 20–50 MW (electric) version will be developed, to be followed by 100 MWe "utility-class reactors" at a later time. Assembly line construction is planned, producing "mobile units that can be dispersed throughout the country where they need to go to generate the power." Initially the company is focusing on producing SMRs to power remote military bases. Flibe has also been proposed for use in a fusion reactor both as a primary coolant and to breed Tritium fuel for D-T reactors.

=== HTR-PM: China ===
The HTR-PM is a high-temperature gas-cooled (HTGR) pebble-bed generation IV reactor partly based on the earlier HTR-10 prototype reactor. The reactor unit has a thermal capacity of 250 MW, and two reactors are connected to a single steam turbine to generate 210 MW of electricity. Its potential applications include direct replacement of supercritical coal-fired power plants, while its heat could be used for seawater desalination, hydrogen production, or a wide range of other high temperature uses in industry.

=== Hyperion Power Module (HPM): United States ===
A commercial version of a Los Alamos National Laboratory project, the Hyperion Power Module (HPM) is a LMR that uses a Pb–Bi coolant. It has an output of 25 MWe, and less than 20% ^{235}U enrichment. The reactor is a sealed vessel, which is brought to the site intact and removed intact for refueling at the factory, reducing proliferation dangers. Each module weighs less than 50 tons. It has both active and passive safety features.

=== Integral Molten Salt Reactor (IMSR): Canada ===
The IMSR Plant is a 2x195 MWe / 2x442 MWt SMR plant design being developed by Terrestrial Energy based in Oakville, Canada. The reactor is proprietary molten salt reactor design that builds on two existing designs: the Denatured Molten Salt Reactor (DMSR) and Small Modular Advanced High Temperature Reactor (smAHRT). Both designs are from Oak Ridge National Laboratory. The key technology of the IMSR® is the integration of the primary reactor components, the moderator, primary heat exchangers and pump into a sealed and replaceable vessel, the IMSR® Core-unit, which is replaced every 7 years. This solves the material lifetime challenges commonly associated with graphite moderators and molten salt use.

The thermal spectrum, graphite moderated, fluoride molten salt reactor, is fueled with Standard Assay (<5% U235) low-enriched uranium (LEU) dissolved in molten fluoride-based salt. It is the only reactor in the Generation IV class that uses Standard Assay LEU fuel. Use of standard fuel simplifies licensability and international acceptance. The Canadian Nuclear Safety Commission (CNSC) completed its Pre-Licensing Vendor Design Review (VDR) of the IMSR Plant design in April 2023.

=== International Reactor Innovative & Secure (IRIS): United States ===
Developed by an international consortium led by Westinghouse and the nuclear energy research initiative (NERI), IRIS-50 is a modular PWR with a generation capacity of 50 MWe. It uses natural circulation for the coolant. The fuel is a uranium oxide with 5% enrichment of ^{235}U that can run for five years between refueling. Higher enrichment might lengthen the refueling period, but could pose some licensing problems. Iris is an integral reactor, with a high-pressure containment design.

=== Modified KLT-40: Russia ===
Based on the design of nuclear power supplies for Russian icebreakers, the modified KLT-40 uses a proven, commercially available PWR system. The coolant system relies on forced circulation of pressurized water during regular operation, although natural convection is usable in emergencies. The fuel may be enriched to above 20%, the limit for low-enriched uranium, which may pose non-proliferation problems. The reactor has an active (requires action and electrical power) safety system with an emergency feedwater system. Refueling is required every two to three years. The first example is a 21,500 tonne ship, the Akademik Lomonosov launched July 2010. The construction of the Akademik Lomonosov was completed at the St. Petersburg shipyards in April 2018. On 14 September 2019, it arrived to its permanent location in the Chukotka region where it provides heat and electricity, replacing Bilibino Nuclear Power Plant, which also use SMR, of old EGP-6 design, to be shut down. Akademik Lomonosov started operation in December 2019.

=== mPower: United States ===
The mPower from Babcock & Wilcox (B&W) is an integrated PWR SMR. The nuclear steam supply systems (NSSS) for the reactor arrive at the site already assembled, and so require very little construction. Each reactor module would produce around 180 MWe, and could be linked together to form the equivalent of one large nuclear power plant. B&W has submitted a letter of intent for design approval to the Nuclear Regulatory Commission (NRC). Babcock & Wilcox announced on February 20, 2013, that they had contracted with the Tennessee Valley Authority to apply for permits to build an mPower small modular reactor at TVA's Clinch River site in Oak Ridge, Tennessee.

In March 2017 the development project was terminated, with Bechtel citing the inability to find a utility company that would provide a site for a first reactor and an investor.

=== NuScale: United States ===
Originally a Department of Energy and Oregon State University research project, continued development and marketing have been handed off to the university's public partner, NuScale Power, Inc. NuScale Power was the first company in the US to receive NRC design certification for an SMR design as of 2025. The NuScale Power Module (NPM) is a light-water reactor (LWR) with ^{235}U fuel enrichment of less than 5%. It has a two-year refueling period. Each module has an electrical output of 77 MWe (gross), and a single NuScale power plant can be scaled from one to 12 modules for a site output of 924 MWe. The company originally hoped to have a plant up and running by 2018. The NRC has now approved three NuScale plant designs, VOYGR (600 MWe), VOYGR-4 (308 MWe), and VOYGR-6 (462 MWe), which are the only US/NRC approved plants as of 2025. NuScale is seeking NRC approval for its larger, 924 MWe design (VOYGR-12).

=== OPEN100: United States ===
OPEN100 is an SMR project developed by the Energy Impact Center that has published the first open-source blueprints for a 100 MWe pressurized water reactor. The project is intended to standardize the construction of nuclear power plants to cut down on cost and duration. According to the design, power plants could be built in as little as two years for $300 million. It is also a template, allowing for site-specific alterations with a plus or minus 20% cost predictability. The reactor could be developed by either a utility or private company. Transcorp Energy of Nigeria agreed to use the OPEN100 model to build the country's first nuclear reactors in July 2021.

=== Pebble Bed Modular Reactor (PBMR): South Africa ===
The Pebble Bed Modular Reactor (PBMR) is a modernized version of a design first proposed in the 1950s and deployed in the 1960s in Germany. It uses spherical fuel elements coated with graphite and silicon carbide filled with up to 10,000 TRISO particles, which contain uranium dioxide (UO_{2}) and appropriate passivation and safety layers. The pebbles are then placed into a reactor core, comprising around 450,000 "pebbles". The core's output is 165 MWe. It runs at very high temperatures (900 °C) and uses helium, a noble gas as the primary coolant; helium is used as it does not interact with structural or nuclear materials. Heat can be transferred to steam generators or gas turbines, which can use either Rankine (steam) or Brayton (gas turbine) cycles. South Africa terminated funding for the development of the PBMR in 2010 and postponed the project indefinitely); most engineers and scientists working on the project have moved abroad to nations such as the United States, Australia, and Canada.

=== Purdue Novel Modular Reactor (NMR): United States ===
Based on the Economic Simplified Boiling Water Reactor designs by General Electric (GE), the NMR is a natural circulation SMR with an electric output of 50 MWe. The NMR has a much shorter Reactor Pressure Vessel compared to conventional BWRs. The coolant steam drives the turbines directly, eliminating the need for a steam generator. It uses natural circulation, so there are no coolant pumps. The reactor has both negative void and negative temperature coefficients. It uses a uranium oxide fuel with ^{235}U enrichment of 5%, which doesn't need to be refueled for ten years. The double passive safety systems include gravity-driven water injection and containment cavity cooling system to withstand prolonged station blackout in case of severe accidents. The NMR would require temporary on-site storage of spent fuel, and even with the modular design would need significant assembly.

=== PWR-20: United States ===
Last Energy is a full-service developer of small modular nuclear power projects with a goal of transforming the nuclear power industry by dramatically reducing the time and cost of construction.

The company's first product, the PWR-20 is a fully-modular SMR with all modules fitting inside of a standard shipping container. It uses pressurized water reactor (PWR) technology providing 20 MWe and is air-cooled. With its ability to be sited away from a water source and a footprint approximately the size of a football field it is targeted towards distributed energy users.

The company says it will cost under $100 million and be deployed in approximately 24 months. Recently Last Energy announced $19 Billion worth of deals in Europe after constructing their demonstration unit in Texas.

Basic schematic of a Gas Cooled Reactor

=== Gas Turbine Modular Helium Reactor (GTMHR): United States ===
The Gas Turbine Modular Helium Reactor (GTMHR) is a General Atomics project. It is a helium gas cooled reactor. The reactor is contained in one vessel, with all of the coolant and heat transfer equipment enclosed in a second vessel, attached to the reactor by a single coaxial line for coolant flow. The plant is a four-story, entirely above-ground building with a 10–25 MWelectrical output. The helium coolant doesn't interact with the structural metals or the reaction, and simply removes the heat, even at extremely high temperatures, which allow around 50% efficiency, whereas water-cooled and fossil fuel plants average 30–35%. The fuel is a uranium oxide coated particle fuel with 19.9% enrichment. The particles are pressed into cylindrical fuel elements and inserted into graphite blocks. For a 10 MWe plant, there are 57 of these graphite blocks in the reactor. The refueling period is six to eight years. Temporary on-site storage of spent fuel is required. Proliferation risks are fairly low, since there are few graphite blocks and it would be very noticeable if some went missing.

=== Rolls-Royce SMR ===
Rolls-Royce is preparing a close-coupled three-loop PWR design, sometimes called the UK SMR. The power output was originally planned to be 440 MWe, later increased to 470 MWe, which is above the usual range considered to be a SMR. A modular forced draft cooling tower will be used. The design targets a 500-day construction time, on a 10 acres (4 ha) site. Overall build time is expected to be four years, two years for site preparation and two years for construction and commissioning. The target cost is £1.8 billion for the fifth unit built.

The consortium developing the design is seeking UK government finance to support further development. In 2017, the UK government provided funding of up to £56 million over three years to support SMR research and development. In 2019 the government committed a further £18 million to the development from its Industrial Strategy Challenge Fund.

In November 2021, the UK government provided funding of £210 million to further develop the design, partly matched by £195 million of investment by Rolls-Royce Group, BNF Resources UK Limited and Exelon Generation Limited. They expect the first unit will be completed in the early 2030s.

Toshiba 4S reactor design

=== Super Safe, Small & Simple (4S): Japan ===
Designed by the Central Research Institute of Electric Power Industry (CRIEPI), the 4S is an extremely modular design, fabricated in a factory and requiring very little construction on-site. It is a sodium (Na) cooled reactor, using a U–Zr or U–Pu–Zr fuel. The design relies on a moveable neutron reflector to maintain a steady state power level for anywhere from 10 to 30 years. The liquid metal coolant allows the use of electro-magnetic (EM) pumps, with natural circulation used in emergencies.

=== Stable Salt Reactor (SSR): Canada/United Kingdom ===
The stable salt reactor (SSR) is a nuclear reactor design proposed by Moltex Energy. It uses molten salt reactor technology and is modular. The design uses static fuel salt in conventional fuel assemblies and standard nuclear certified steel.

=== Westinghouse SMR and AP300 ===
The Westinghouse SMR design is a scaled down version of the AP1000 reactor, designed to generate 225 MWe. After losing a second time in December 2013 for funding through the U.S. Department of Energy's SMR commercialization program, and citing "no customers" for SMR technology, Westinghouse announced in January 2014 that it is backing off from further development of the company's SMR. Westinghouse staff devoted to SMR development was "reprioritized" to the company's AP1000.

On 4 May 2023 Westinghouse announced the AP300, which is a 300 MWe, single-loop pressurized water reactor based on the AP1000. Design certification is anticipated by 2027, followed by site specific licensing and construction on the first unit toward the end of the decade.

== See also ==
- List of nuclear reactors
- List of United States Naval reactors
- List of Soviet Naval reactors
- List of Russian small nuclear reactors
