= Small modular reactor =

Type of nuclear fission reactor

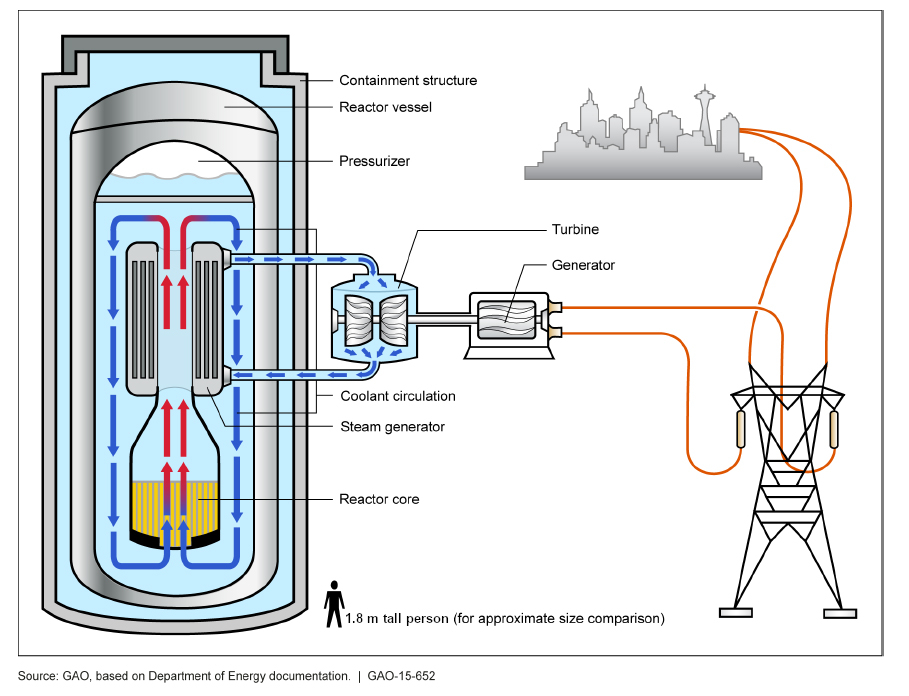
Illustration of a light water small modular nuclear reactor (SMR)

A small modular reactor (SMR) is an emergent class of nuclear reactors with a rated electrical power of less than 300 megawatts (MW_{e}), which use modular design principles to achieve streamlined construction and enhanced scalability compared to large light-water reactors. The term SMR refers to the physical size, electrical capacity, and modular construction approach.

The basic concept of modular reactors is that the main components are prefabricated on large scale in factories off-site as modules and then transported to the site where the power plant is built. Proponents argue that this makes nuclear power plants cheaper and faster to build. Critics say that the low power output of SMRs will make them relatively expensive and economically unprofitable.

Commercial SMRs are designed to deliver an electrical power output as low as 10 MW_{e} and up to 300 MW_{e} per module. (Note: No definitive range for SMR power levels exists, but 10 MW to 300 MW is generally accepted.) Reactors below 10 MW_{e} in capacity are considered nuclear microreactors. SMRs may also be designed purely for desalination or process heat rather than electricity. These SMRs are measured in megawatts thermal (MW_{th}). In some designs, modules can be combined to achieve a desired electrical output rather than scaling the size of the reactor.

Reactor technology varies significantly among SMR designs. The concepts encompass various reactor types, including generation IV, thermal-neutron reactors, fast-neutron reactors, molten salt reactor, and gas-cooled reactor models. Many also incorporate passive safety features. These are designed to enhance safety through passive safety systems that operate without external power or human intervention during emergency scenarios, although this is not specific to SMRs but rather a characteristic of most modern reactor designs. SMRs are also claimed to have lower power plant staffing costs, as their operation is fairly simple, and are claimed to have the ability to bypass financial and safety barriers that inhibit the construction of conventional reactors.

SMRs have attracted strong interest from technology companies, such as Google and Microsoft, for use in powering data centers to meet demand driven by the AI boom. Modular reactors are hoped to reduce construction time and cost compared to large light-water reactors, as well as to allow data center operators to generate their own power thereby negating the need to purchase electricity from the power grid.

== Definition ==
According to the American Nuclear Society (ANS), while small or modular reactor concepts date back to the 1950s, the term "small modular reactor" first entered common use in the late 1970s. Since then, the definition of an SMR has remained somewhat controversial.

John Fabian, writing in Nuclear Newswire, stated in 2026 that until around 2011, the abbreviation "SMR" referred either to "small modular reactor" or "small and medium sized reactor". According to Fabian, "the way 'SMR' is being used today does not seem consistent and is design dependent." For example, as of 2026 the United States Nuclear Regulatory Commission (NRC) defines SMRs as only light-water reactors under 300 MW_{e}, while non-LWR designs are considered "advanced reactors". At the same time, the World Nuclear Association defines SMRs as any reactor under 300 MW_{e} so long as it is designed with modular technology. According to Fabian, the classification of reactors as SMRs based on their power output has remained consistent, with reactors under 300 MW_{e} being classified as SMRs.

As of 2023, there was broad consensus in the nuclear industry that SMRs are defined as nuclear reactors designed intentionally for low power (below 300 MW_{e}) and with modular design applied either to individual components or the entire assembly.

== Operational SMRs ==
As of 2026, only China and Russia have successfully built operational SMRs. Russia has been operating a floating nuclear power plant Akademik Lomonosov, in Russia's Far East (Pevek), commercially since 2020. China's pebble-bed modular high-temperature gas-cooled reactor HTR-PM was connected to the grid in 2021.

As of 2025, there were 127 modular reactor designs, with seven designs operating or under construction, 51 in the pre-licensing or licensing process, and 85 designers in discussions with potential site owners.

== Background ==
While small modular reactors have experienced a resurgence in the 2000s, they are not a novel concept, and have been under development for many decades.

=== Early small reactors ===
Small reactors have been used for military use since the 1950s for nuclear marine propulsion. The thermal output of the largest naval reactor as of 2025 is estimated at 700 MW_{t} (the A1B reactor), similar in capacity to some large SMR plant designs. Naval nuclear reactors have had an excellent record of safety. According to public information, the US Navy's Naval Reactors program has never succumbed to a meltdown or radioactive release over its 60 years of service. In 2003, Admiral Frank Bowman backed up the Navy's claim by testifying no such accident has ever occurred. Several nuclear-powered commercial vessels have also been constructed, including four nuclear freighters and nine nuclear icebreakers.

Lawrence R. Hafstad, the Director of Reactor Development at the United States Atomic Energy Commission, proposed building small, cheap, transportable nuclear power packages for use in remote areas. Alvin M. Weinberg, Director of Research at Oak Ridge National Laboratory (ORNL), wrote in support of Hafstad's proposal in 1952, adding that the naval reactors could provide a basis for developing nuclear power packages. He suggested that building many small reactors for remote sites would reduce the financial risk of establishing a nuclear industry:

The main advantage of the power-package approach to establishment of a nuclear energy industry is that the technology would rely on comparatively many small units, rather than on a very few enormous ones. Thus industry would not try to hit the jackpot right off, but would edge into the business a little at a time and at each stage would be able to match its risk with its financial capability.

— Alvin Weinberg, "Wanted: Smaller and More Reactors", Nucleonics (November 1952)

Between 1954 and 1977, the US Army experimented with powering military installations with small land-based reactors during the Army Nuclear Power Program. The preliminary design for one such reactor was produced by ORNL under Weinberg's supervision. One of the Army reactors, PM-2A, was noted as extensively utilizing prefabricated modules to achieve lower construction cost.

Military small reactors are quite different from commercial SMRs. Historically, the military relied on highly enriched uranium (HEU) to power their reactors and not the low-enriched uranium (LEU) fuel used by SMRs. This is because submarine reactors are severely space-constrained and require higher power density than civilian reactors. Many naval reactors also operate for over a decade or more without refueling.

Early land-based reactors constructed in the United States were relatively small, such as the 60 MW Shippingport Atomic Power Station and the 250 MW Indian Point Unit 1. However, these reactors were intended to be scaled up into large central-station power plants, to take advantage of economies of scale. Soon after the first successful nuclear demonstrations, utilities raced to scale up plants before operational experience could be gained from smaller units. While traditional engineering wisdom dictates that a system should be scaled up twofold, by the time many nuclear plants with capacities exceeding 1000 MW were being ordered and constructed, no reactor larger than 250 MW was operational. (Note: "The 10-year lag time in the design, engineering, licensing, and construction of new plants created a situation in which utilities were ordering (and vendors were selling) plants that were sixfold larger than current operational experience. This compares to a more traditional rule of thumb that recommends a twofold scale-up for complex engineered systems. The more aggressive approach employed by the nuclear industry required a significant leap of faith, which unfortunately did not play out well.") While nuclear power plants were formerly designed as effectively standardized designs, the growth of operational issues and new safety requirements led to plants being designed and built as "one-of-a-kind" designs, further increasing cost, construction, and licensing issues. Reactor orders soon fell off sharply, and none of the plants ordered after 1974, except Watts Bar Unit 2, were ever constructed. The nuclear industry, throughout the following decades, would focus on optimizing the existing large reactors, whose average capacity factors rose from 50% to 90% by the mid-2000s.

=== Renewed interest ===
In 1982, the Electric Power Research Institute (EPRI) conducted a study that recommended smaller, less capital-intensive, and inherently safe reactors be designed instead of large light-water reactors. Weinberg, then the director of the Institute for Energy Analysis, conducted a related study into inherently safe reactors. It concluded that such a system was possible, and selected the 400 MW Swedish Process Inherent Ultimate Safety (PIUS) and 100 MW American Modular High Temperature Gas-cooled Reactor (MHTGR) designs as the most intrinsically safe. At this time, multiple high-temperature gas-cooled reactors were being designed with the intention of building a large plant out of several modular low-power reactors. The PIUS reactor, with its reactor vessel situated within a large pool of borated water, and the robust TRISO fuel of the General Atomics MHTGR influenced subsequent SMR design features. Several small prefabricated reactor designs were developed around the same time in the UK, France, and Germany, however none were constructed. The EPRI study also led to the Department of Energy's (DOE) Advanced Light Water Reactor program, which resulted in the development of two 600 MW LWRs, the General Electric ABWR and later SBWR, and the Westinghouse AP-600 designs. However, these were later scaled up significantly into the ESBWR and AP-1000 reactors. Two AP-1000 reactors were later constructed as Vogtle Units 3 and 4, together costing $30 billion due to delays and cost overruns.

The DOE also ran an Advanced Liquid-Metal Reactor program, which led to the development of the Power Reactor Inherently Safe Module (PRISM) SMR by General Electric in the 1980s and 1990s. Each 1400 MW PRISM plant would be composed of nine 160 MW reactor modules, which would each be factory-fabricated and shipped by rail to the construction site. PRISM's use of multiple factory-fabricated modules to comprise a large power plant and its extensive use of passive safety features were both carried into later SMR designs. In 1983, the International Atomic Energy Agency started the Small and Medium Power Reactor Project Initiation Study to survey designs for small and medium sized reactors. The Nuclear Energy Agency launched a follow-on study in 1991 that evaluated 17 small or medium-sized reactor concepts, including several from the DOE's Advanced Light Water and Liquid-Metal programs.

Government support for reactor design steadily declined, leading to the DOE being issued no budget for nuclear development at all in 1998. However, in 1999 the DOE began the Nuclear Energy Research Initiative (NERI), followed by the Generation IV International Forum in 2000, and later the Global Nuclear Energy Partnership (GNEP) in 2006. The NERI program resulted in the development of multiple SMR designs, including liquid metal-cooled reactors and SMRs designed for process heat, as well as others based on existing LWR technology. In 2001, a report to Congress examining 50 MW_{e} small modular reactors for powering remote areas, "found no substantive technical issues to hinder development and deployment of SMRs, and initial estimates of the electricity generation costs are comparable to, if not better than, those for current electricity supplies in typical remote areas." One concept, the IRIS SMR, would later receive significant commercial interest and funding under the GNEP, while another, the MASLWR, later formed the basis for NuScale's SMR. The GNEP and its associated programs also catalyzed significantly greater industry and utility interest in developing SMRs.

The term "small modular reactors" as opposed to "small-and-medium-sized reactors" was brought to wider use when US Secretary of Energy Steven Chu identified "small modular reactors" as "America's new nuclear option" in a 2010 Wall Street Journal op-ed, where he stated "SMRs would be ready to 'plug and play' upon arrival [on site]" and be more affordable. He announced that President Barack Obama had requested $39 million for a new SMR design and licensing program.

However, the reactors that were ordered at the time as part of the expected nuclear renaissance were all large light-water plants. Almost all of these projects failed, largely due to slow federal funding, little growth in electricity consumption, and the 2008 financial crisis, the effects of which were exacerbated by the high cost and financial risk of the plants. The Fukushima accident in 2011, while resulting in a significant loss of interest in nuclear energy, drew increased attention to SMRs. In 2012, the DOE began its SMR program in earnest, by which point interest in SMRs was significant.

=== Hope of enhanced safety and reduced costs ===
Economic factors of scale mean that nuclear reactors tend to be large, to such an extent that size itself becomes a limiting factor. Furthermore, the 1986 Chernobyl disaster caused a major setback for the nuclear industry, with worldwide suspension of development, cuts in funding, and closure of reactor plants.

Proponents claim that SMRs would be less expensive due to the application of standardized modules that could be industrially produced off-site in a dedicated factory. SMRs do, however, also have economic disadvantages. Several studies suggest that the overall costs of SMRs are comparable with those of conventional large reactors. Moreover, extremely limited information about SMR modules transportation has been published. Critics say that modular building will only be cost-effective for a high number of the same SMR type, given the still remaining high costs for each SMR. A high market share is thus needed to obtain sufficient orders.

=== Contribution to the net zero emissions pathways ===
In February 2024, the European Commission recognized SMR technology as an important contributor to decarbonization as part of the EU Green Deal.

In its pathway to reach global net zero emissions by 2050, the International Energy Agency (IEA) considers that worldwide nuclear power should be doubled between 2020 and 2050. Antonio Vaya Soler, an expert from the Nuclear Energy Agency (NEA), agrees that although renewable energy is essential to fight global warming, it will not be sufficient to achieve net zero CO_{2} emissions and nuclear energy capacity should be at least doubled.

To produce the same electrical power as the ~ 400 large nuclear power reactors in the world today, BASE, the German Federal Office for the Safety of Nuclear Waste Management, warns that it would be necessary to build several thousand to tens of thousands of SMRs.

Several fleets of SMRs of exactly the same type, industrially manufactured in large numbers, should be rapidly deployed worldwide to significantly reduce emissions of CO_{2}. The Nuclear Energy Agency (NEA) launched at COP 28 an initiative Accelerating SMRs for Net Zero to foster collaboration between research organizations, nuclear industry, safety authorities, and governments, in order to reduce carbon emissions to net zero before 2050 to limit global surface temperature increase.

=== Future challenges ===
Proponents say that nuclear energy with proven technology can be safer; the nuclear industry contends that smaller size will make SMRs even safer than larger conventional plants. This is because the main problem associated with nuclear meltdowns is the decay heat that is present after reactor shutdown, which would be much lower for SMRs because of their lower power output. Critics say that many more small nuclear reactors pose a higher risk, requiring more transportation of nuclear fuel and also increasing the production of radioactive waste. SMRs require new designs with new technology, the safety of which has yet to be proven.

SMRs remain facing a distinct engineering risk of corrosion affecting critical systems and materials. Particularly in SMR systems that use liquid metals or molten salts cooling techniques. Lack of a licensing process and safety framework has left limited SMRs in preventing potential corrosion levels produced in alternative SMR designs.

Until 2020, no truly modular SMRs had been commissioned for commercial use. In May 2020, the first prototype of a floating nuclear power plant with two 30 MW_{e} reactors – the type KLT-40 – started operation in Pevek, Russia. This concept is based on the design of nuclear icebreakers. The operation of the first commercial land-based, 125 MW_{e} demonstration reactor ACP100 (Linglong One) is due to start in China by the end of 2026.

The introduction of SMRs has sparked social and institutional concern. Nuclear projects are of policy agendas, meaning centralization of SMRs. The distribution of SMRs has culminated in criticism and discussion of risk towards communities affected by lack of flexible energy. As any other energy source, communities are left out and potential environmental issues are needed to be assessed given the rate of expansion of SMR. In 2026, Natixis Corporate and Investment Banking reported that the SMR sector was still far from commercial reality and was entering a phase where engineering ambition must confront regulatory complexity, financing realities and industrial execution.

== Designs ==
A nuclear fission chain is required to generate nuclear power.

SMRs are envisioned in multiple designs. Some are simplified versions of current reactors, others involve entirely new technologies. All proposed SMRs use nuclear fission with designs including thermal-neutron reactors and fast-neutron reactors.

=== Thermal-neutron reactors ===
Thermal-neutron reactors rely on a moderator (water, graphite, beryllium...) to slow neutrons and generally use ^{235}U as fissile material. Most conventional operating reactors are of this type.

=== Fast reactors ===
Fast reactors do not use moderators. Instead, they rely on highly enriched uranium (HEU) fuel to absorb fast neutrons. This usually means changing the fuel arrangement within the core, or using different fuels. E.g., ^{239}Pu is more likely to absorb a fast neutron than ^{235}U.

Fast reactors can also be breeder reactors. These reactors release enough neutrons to transmute non-fissionable elements into fissionable ones. A common use for a breeder reactor is to surround the core by a "blanket" of ^{238}U, the most easily available isotope. Once the ^{238}U undergoes a neutron absorption reaction, it becomes ^{239}Pu, which can be removed from the reactor during refueling, and subsequently reprocessed and used as fuel.

=== Coolant ===
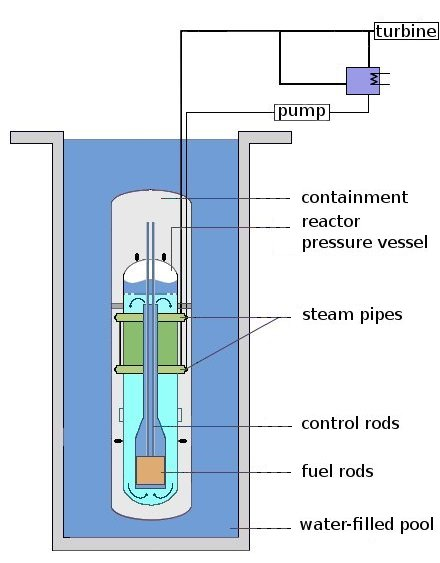
Diagram of NRC approved SMR type: Pumpless light water reactor developed by NuScale Power as mini nuclear reactor.

Conventional light-water reactors typically use water as a coolant and neutron moderator. SMRs may use water, liquid metal, gas and molten salt as coolants. Coolant type is determined based on the reactor type, reactor design, and the chosen application. Large-rated reactors primarily use light water as coolant, allowing for this cooling method to be easily applied to SMRs. Helium is often elected as a gas coolant for SMRs because it yields a high plant thermal efficiency and supplies a sufficient amount of reactor heat. Sodium, lead, and lead-bismuth eutectic (LBE) are liquid metal coolants studied for 4th generation SMRs. There was a large focus on sodium during early work on large-rated reactors which has since carried over to SMRs to be a prominent choice as a liquid metal coolant. SMRs have lower cooling water requirements, which expands the number of sites where KLT-40S SMRs loaded on a bargea SMR could be built, including remote areas typically incorporating mining and desalination.

== Applications ==
=== Thermal/electrical generation ===
Some gas-cooled reactor designs could drive a gas turbine, rather than boiling water, such that thermal energy can be used directly. Heat could also be used in hydrogen production and other industrial operations, such as desalination and the production of petroleum derivative (extracting oil from oil sands, making synthetic oil from coal, etc.).

=== Load following ===
SMR designs are generally expected to provide base load electrical power; some proposed designs are aimed to adjust their power output based on electricity demand.

Another approach, especially for SMRs designed to provide high temperature heat, is to adopt cogeneration, maintaining consistent heat output, while diverting otherwise unneeded heat to an auxiliary use. District heating, desalination and hydrogen production have been proposed as cogeneration options.

Overnight desalination requires sufficient freshwater storage capacity to deliver water at times other than when it is produced. Reverse osmosis membrane and thermal evaporators are the two main techniques for seawater desalination. The membrane desalination process uses only electricity to power water pumps and is the most employed of the two methods. In the thermal process, the feed water stream is evaporated in different stages with continuous decreases in pressure between the stages. The thermal process directly uses thermal energy and avoids the conversion of thermal power into electricity. Thermal desalination is further divided into two main technologies: the multi-stage flash distillation (MSF) and the Multi-Effect Desalination (MED).

=== Flexibility ===
Small nuclear reactors, in comparison to conventional nuclear power plants, offer potential advantages related to the flexibility of their modular construction. It would be possible to incrementally connect additional units to the grid in the event electrical load increases. Additionally, this flexibility in a standardized SMRs design revolving around modularity could allow for a faster production at a decreasing cost following the completion of the first reactor on site.

The hypothesized flexibility and modularity of SMR is intended to allow additional power generation capability to be installed at existing power plants. A site could host several SMRs, one going off-line for refueling while the other reactors stay online as it is presently already the case for conventional larger reactors.

SMRs operating in hybrid energy systems combining with renewables can develop multipurpose configurations developing system-level efficiency in sectors difficult to electrify.

Hybrid system integration of SMRs without needed electrical generation foresees the direct use of thermal energy in co-generation. This includes desalination, district heating, industrial heating, industrial processes, and hydrogen production.

Flexibility of SMRs enable nuclear energy use within broader energy system integration, and expanding emission reduction goals to varying degrees.

SMRs have been proposed for micro-grids in remote regions; flexibility of SMR allows for base-load generation, adjusting output from a response to demand. Complimenting wind and solar power intermittently. SMRs enhancing resilience in geographically isolated communities.

When electrical energy is not needed, some SMR designs foresee the direct use of thermal energy, minimizing so the energy loss. This includes "desalination, industrial processes, hydrogen production, shale oil recovery, and district heating", uses for which the present conventional larger reactors are not designed.

=== Siting and infrastructure ===
SMRs are expected to be more flexible in their deployment than large power plants. The use of inherent safety features and smaller emergency planning zones is expected to allow them to be deployed on industrial or military sites as well as closer to urban areas. They can also be deployed in power grids that are too small to accommodate large reactors. Electricity needs in remote locations are usually small and variable, making a smaller plant ideal.

In rural areas, limited grid coverage limits the deployment of large power plants. According to the IAEA, a single power plant should not represent more than 10% of the total grid capacity. Their smaller physical footprint and smaller generating capacity makes SMRs better suited for small power grids.

== Economics ==
=== Construction costs ===
A SMR factory would require substantial upfront capital. Per-unit costs would only become economical when an estimated 40–70 units are produced.

A potential advantage is that a future power station using SMRs can begin with a single module and expand by adding modules as demand grows. This reduces startup costs associated with conventional designs. Some SMRs also have a load-following design such that they could produce less electricity when demand is low.

Construction costs per SMR reactor were claimed in 2016 to be less than that for a conventional nuclear plant, while exploitation costs might be higher for SMRs due to low scale economics and the higher number of reactors. SMR staff operating costs per unit output can be as much as 190% higher than the fixed operating cost of fewer large reactors. Modular building is a very complex process and there is "extremely limited information about SMR modules transportation", according to a 2019 report.

A production cost calculation done by the German Federal Office for the Safety of Nuclear Waste Management (BASE), taking into account economies of scale and learning effects from the nuclear industry, suggests that an average of 3,000 SMR would have to be produced before SMR production would be worthwhile. This is because the construction costs of SMRs are relatively higher than those of large nuclear power plants due to the low electrical output.

In 2020, Energy Impact Center founder Bret Kugelmass claimed that thousands of SMRs could be built in parallel, "thus reducing costs associated with long borrowing times for prolonged construction schedules and reducing risk premiums currently linked to large projects". GE Vernova Hitachi Nuclear Energy Executive Vice President Jon Ball agreed, saying the modular elements of SMRs would also help reduce costs associated with extended construction times.

=== Energy costs ===
According to a 2014 study of electricity production in decentralized microgrids, the total cost of using SMRs for electricity generation would be significantly lower compared to the total cost of offshore wind power, solar thermal energy, biomass, and solar photovoltaic electricity generation plants.

In 2017, an Energy Innovation Reform Project (EIRP) study of eight companies looked at reactor designs with capacity between 47.5 MWe and 1,648 MWe. The study reported average capital cost of $3,782/kW, average operating cost total of $21/MWh and levelized cost of electricity (LCOE) of $60/MWh.

In October 2023, an academic paper published in Energy collated the basic economic data of 19 more developed SMR designs, and modeled their costs in a consistent manner. A Monte Carlo simulation showed that none were profitable or economically competitive. For the closer to market PWR SMRs the median LCOEs ranged from $218/MWh to $614/MWh (in 2020 US dollars), with lower first quartile estimates from $188/MWh to $385/MWh. The three high-temperature gas-cooled reactor designs, which needed more development time, had lower median LCOEs from $116/MWh to $137/MWh.

The first SMR deployment project in the US was the Carbon Free Power Project, which planned to deploy six 77 MWe NuScale reactors, reduced from twelve in earlier plans. Estimated target electricity generation price after subsidies was $89/MWh in 2023, an increase from $58/MWh in 2021. The increased generation cost led to the decision to cancel the project in November 2023. Before its cancellation, the project received a $1.355 billion cost-share award toward construction costs from the US government in 2020 plus an estimated $30/MWh generation subsidy from the Inflation Reduction Act of 2022. Unsubsidized cost estimates at cancellation were a capital cost of $20,139/kW and generating cost of $119/MWe. This raised concerns about the commercial prospects in the US of the other SMR designs.

In 2024, Australian scientific research body CSIRO estimated that electricity produced in Australia by a SMR constructed from 2023 would cost roughly 2.5 times that produced by a traditional large nuclear plant, falling to about 1.6 times by 2030.

The final investment decision in 2025 to proceed with the build of a BWRX-300 SMR in Canada was based on a forecast cost of CA$7.7 billion (US$5.6 billion), with an estimated cost of CA$13.2 billion (US$9.6 billion) for three further units. These costs include finance charges and some contingency.

== Societal issues ==
=== Nuclear safety ===
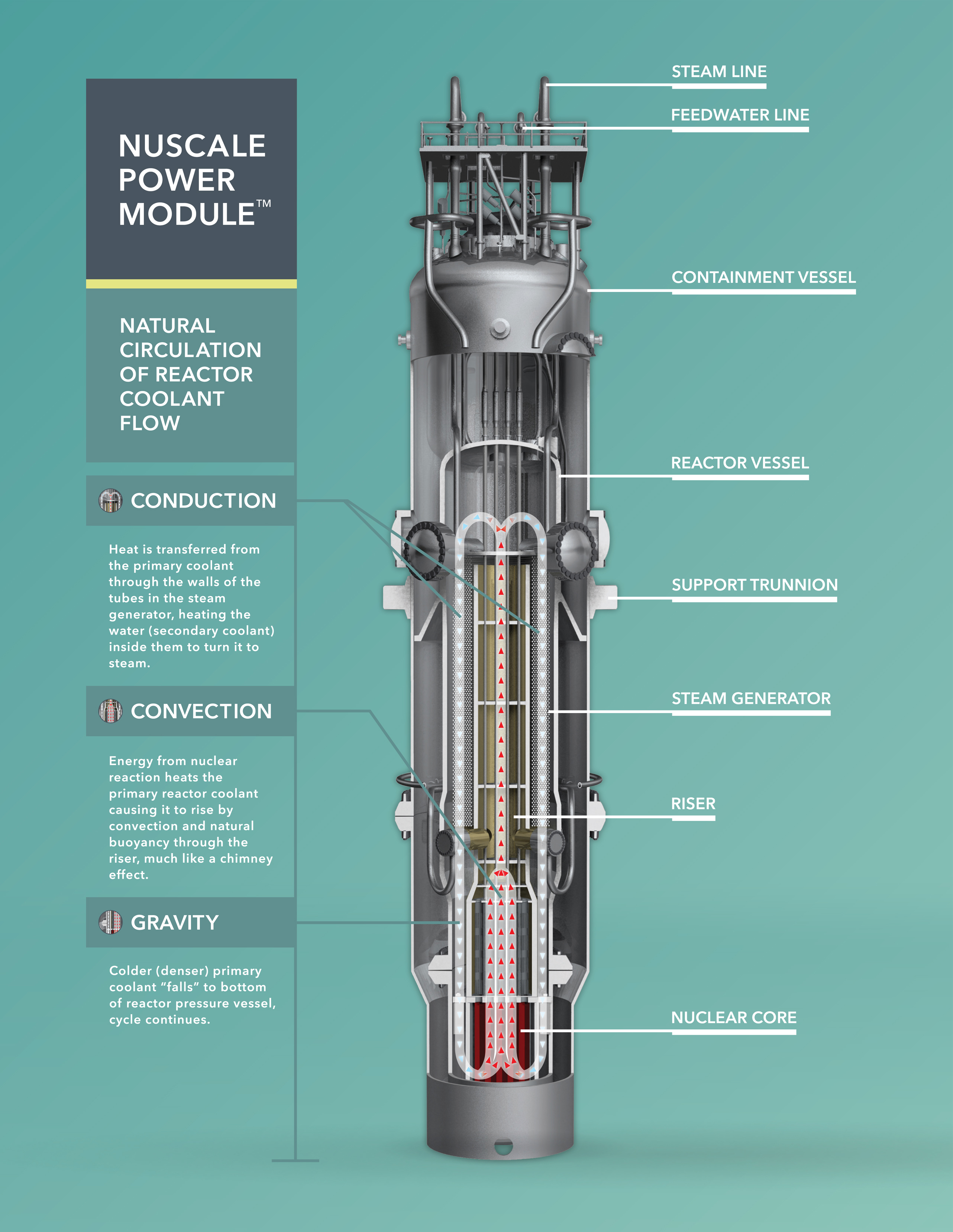
The NuScale Power Module, a pressurized-water SMR design, extensively uses passive safety systems. It does not use a primary coolant pump, instead circulating water through natural convection.

A report by the German Federal Office for the Safety of Nuclear Waste Management (BASE) considering 136 different historical and current reactors and SMR concepts stated: "Overall, SMRs could potentially achieve safety advantages compared to power plants with a larger power output, as they have a lower radioactive inventory per reactor and aim for a higher safety level especially through simplifications and an increased use of passive systems. In contrast, however, various SMR concepts also favour reduced regulatory requirements, for example, with regard to the required degree of redundancy or diversity in safety systems. Some developers even demand that current requirements be waived, for example in the area of internal accident management or with reduced planning zones, or even a complete waiver of external emergency protection planning. Since the safety of a reactor plant depends on all of these factors, based on the current state of knowledge it is not possible to state, that a higher safety level is achieved by SMR concepts in principle."

Negative temperature coefficients in the moderators and the fuels keep the fission reactions under control, causing the reaction to slow as temperature increases. After the shutdown of a nuclear reactor, the reactor needs to be cooled continuously in order to dissipate decay heat. A loss of emergency cooling such as in the Fukushima nuclear accident and the Three Mile Island accident can result in a nuclear meltdown when the temperature in the reactor becomes too high. Since the initial decay heat is a fraction of the reactor operating power, the lower operating power of SMRs makes them much safer since less heat needs to be dissipated.

Some SMR designs proposes cooling systems only based on thermoconvection – natural circulation – to eliminate cooling pumps that could break down. Convection can keep removing decay heat after reactor shutdown. However, some SMRs may need an active cooling system to back up the passive system, increasing cost.

Some SMR designs feature an integral design of which the primary reactor core, steam generator and the pressurizer are integrated within the sealed reactor vessel. This integrated design allows for the reduction of a possible accident as contamination leaks could be contained. In comparison to larger reactors having numerous components outside the reactor vessel, this feature increases the safety by decreasing the risks of an uncontained accident. Some SMR designs also envisage to install the reactor and the spent-fuel storage pools underground.

=== Radioactive waste ===
The back end of the nuclear fuel cycle for SMRs is a complex and contested issue that remains under debate. The quantity and radiotoxicity of the radioactive waste produced by SMRs depend primarily on their design and the corresponding fuel cycle. Because SMRs encompass a broad spectrum of nuclear reactor types, there is no simple answer to this issue. SMRs may include small light water reactors of the third generation, as well as small fast neutron reactors of the fourth generation.

Some startup companies developing unconventional SMR prototypes often advocate waste reduction as a key advantage of their proposed solutions, and in some cases claim that their technology could eliminate the need for a deep geological repository to dispose of high-level and long-lived radioactive waste. This is particularly true for companies developing fast neutron reactors of the fourth generation, such as molten salt reactors and metal-cooled reactors, including the sodium-cooled fast reactor and lead-cooled fast reactor.

Fast breeder reactors "burn" ^{235}U (0.7% of natural uranium) as fuel, but they also convert fertile materials such as ^{238}U (which makes up 99.3% of natural uranium) into fissile ^{239}Pu. This newly produced plutonium can then be used as nuclear fuel. The traveling wave reactor proposed by TerraPower is designed to "burn" the fuel it breeds in situ, without requiring its removal from the reactor core or further reprocessing.

Some SMR designs are based on the thorium fuel cycle, which is advocated by their promoters as a way to reduce the long-term radiotoxicity of waste compared to the uranium cycle. However, the thorium cycle also presents significant operational challenges due to the production and use of ^{232}U and the long-lived fertile ^{233}U, both of which emit strong gamma rays. As a result, the presence of these radionuclides complicates the radiation shielding of fresh nuclear fuel and the long-term storage and disposal of their spent nuclear fuel.

A 2022 study by Krall, Macfarlane and Ewing took a more critical approach, reporting that certain types of SMRs could produce more waste per unit of output power than conventional reactors—sometimes more than five times the amount of spent nuclear fuel per kilowatt, and up to thirty-five times more waste generated by neutron activation, such as activated steel and graphite. The authors identified neutron leakage as a primary issue for SMRs, as these reactors have a higher surface-area-to-volume ratio than conventional reactors. They calculated that, in smaller reactor cores, neutron leakage rates are significantly higher because emitted neutrons are less likely to interact with fissile atoms in the fuel and induce fission. Instead, more neutrons escape the core and are absorbed by materials used in neutron reflectors and shielding (thermal and gamma shields), rendering these materials radioactive waste through neutron activation. Reactor designs using liquid metal coolants—such as molten sodium, lead, or lead-bismuth eutectic (LBE)—also become radioactive and contain activated impurities.

Another issue pinpointed by Krall et al. (2022) related to higher neutron leakage in SMRs is that a lower fraction of their nuclear fuel is consumed, resulting in lower burnup and leaving more fissile material in their spent nuclear fuel, thereby increasing the waste volume. To sustain chain reactions in the smaller cores of SMRs, an alternative is to use nuclear fuel with a higher enrichment of ^{235}U. This could increase the risks of nuclear proliferation and may require more stringent safeguard measures to prevent it (see also IAEA safeguards).

If higher concentrations of fissile material remain in the spent fuel, the critical mass needed to sustain a nuclear chain reaction is also lower. As a direct consequence, the number of spent fuel assemblies present in a waste canister must also be lower, necessitating a larger number of canisters and overpacks (containment structures) to avoid criticality accidents and guarantee nuclear criticality safety in a deep geological repository. This also contributes to increased total waste volume and the number of disposal galleries needed in a geological repository.

Given the potential technical and economic importance of SMRs in providing zero-carbon electrical energy for climate change mitigation, as well as the long-term and social relevance of managing and disposing of radioactive waste without imposing a negative burden on future generations, the publication of Krall et al. (2022) in the prestigious PNAS journal has attracted numerous responses. These range from criticisms regarding the quality of their data and hypotheses to international debates on radioactive waste generated by SMRs and their decommissioning.

The high diversity of SMR reactors and their respective fuel cycles may require more diverse waste management strategies to recycle or safely dispose of their nuclear waste. Managing a larger number of spent fuel types will be more challenging than the current situation, where most spent fuel comes from light water reactors.

As Krall and Macfarlane stressed in a 2018 paper, some types of SMR spent fuels or coolants—such as highly reactive and corrosive uranium fluoride (UF_{4}) from molten salt reactors or pyrophoric sodium from liquid metal-cooled fast breeders—cannot be directly disposed of in a deep geologic repository because of their chemical reactivity in underground environments (such as deep clay formations, crystalline rocks, or rock salt). To avoid exacerbating spent fuel storage and disposal issues, it will be necessary to reprocess and condition these materials in an appropriate and safe manner before final geological disposal.

A study by Keto et al. (2022) at the VTT Technical Research Centre of Finland also addressed the management of spent nuclear fuel (SNF) and low- and intermediate-level waste (LILW) from the possible future deployment of SMRs in Finland. The study indicated that, per gigawatt-electric-year (GWe-year), larger masses of SNF and other high-level waste (HLW), as well as larger volumes of low-level waste (LLW), would be produced by a light water SMR compared to a large nuclear power plant.

A report by the German Federal Office for the Safety of Nuclear Waste Management (BASE) found that extensive interim storage and fuel transports would still be required for SMRs. The report also concluded that a deep geological repository is unavoidable due to the presence of highly mobile, long-lived fission products that cannot be efficiently transmuted because of their low neutron cross section. This is the case with dose-dominating radionuclides such as ^{129}I, ^{99}Tc, and ^{79}Se, which exist as soluble anions that are not sorbed onto the negatively charged minerals and are not retarded in geological media.

Nuclear waste is regulated within the existing nuclear governance systems, originally designed for conventional nuclear reactors. In the United States, oversight of waste is coordinated through the US Nuclear Regulatory Framework Commission and US Department of Energy. SMRs produce broadly similar categories of waste as large reactors, however differences in deployment of scale, design, and use of SMR alters the transportation needs, logistics, and containment demands.

=== Nuclear proliferation ===
Nuclear proliferation, or the use of nuclear materials to create weapons, is a concern for small modular reactors. As SMRs have lower generation capacity and are physically smaller, they are intended to be deployed in many more locations than conventional plants. SMRs are expected to substantially reduce staffing levels. The combination creates physical protection and security concerns.

SMRs can be designed to use unconventional fuels allowing for higher burnup and longer fuel cycles. Longer refueling intervals could contribute to decrease the proliferation risks. Once the fuel has been irradiated, the mixture of fission products and fissile materials is highly radioactive and requires special handling, preventing casual theft.

Contrasting to conventional large reactors, SMRs can be adapted to be installed in a sealed underground chamber; therefore, "reducing the vulnerability of the reactor to a terrorist attack or a natural disaster". New SMR designs enhance the proliferation resistance, such as those from the reactor design company Gen4. These models of SMR offer a solution capable of operating sealed underground for the life of the reactor following installation.

Some SMR designs are designed for one-time fueling. This improves proliferation resistance by eliminating on-site nuclear fuel handling and means that the fuel can be sealed within the reactor. However, this design requires large amounts of fuel, which could make it a more attractive target. A 200 MWe 30-year core life light water SMR could contain about 2.5 tonnes of plutonium at end of life.

Furthermore, many SMRs offer the ability to go periods of greater than 10 years without requiring any form of refueling therefore improving the proliferation resistance as compared to conventional large reactors of which entail refueling every 18–24 months.

Light-water reactors designed to run on thorium offer increased proliferation resistance compared to the conventional uranium cycle, though molten salt reactors have a substantial risk.

SMRs are transported from the factories without fuel, as they are fueled on the ultimate site, except some microreactors. This implies an independent transport of the fuel to the site and therefore increases the risk of nuclear proliferation. At the same time, millions of tons of nuclear waste are being shipped across the United States each year and there is no history of nuclear fuel or waste theft from these deliveries.

=== Licensing process ===
Licensing is an essential process required to guarantee the safety and security of a new nuclear installation. The safety and feasibility cases of nuclear installations have to take into account all processes and elements important for the operational safety, its physical security, safeguards (risk of proliferation), the proper conditioning of radioactive waste, and the long-term safety related to the final disposal of the different types of radwaste produced, including all the waste produced during dismantling operations after decommissioning of the installation. A particularly important point of attention for the backend of the nuclear fuel cycle is to avoid to producing poorly conditioned waste, or waste types without sustainable final destination or susceptible to generating unexpected reprocessing and disposal costs.

Licensing of reactor designs is commonly considered a potential barrier to SMR deployment. SMR designs encompass a broad range of reactor technologies and potential use cases. Many of these designs differ substantially from existing reactors. Accordingly, the licensing pathway for SMRs is highly design-dependent.

The majority of existing reactors are large light-water reactors (LWRs), including pressurized water reactors and boiling water reactors. Existing licensing procedures are generally based around these large LWRs. These procedures can in many cases be directly applied to SMRs, particularly light-water designs similar to existing reactors. However, non-light-water designs, and SMRs with certain features such as autonomous operation, may encounter significantly more difficulty.

In the United States, the Nuclear Regulatory Commission licenses nuclear power plants under two separate licensing pathways. The traditional process is a two-step pathway (Part 50), which involves a construction permit followed by an operating permit. A newer pathway, Part 52, involves a single, combined construction and operating license (COL), as well as an optional design certification process. While both pathways are technology-neutral, their supporting guidance is primarily designed for light-water reactors. In particular, the NRC's general design criteria is primarily geared towards light-water reactors. In response, the NRC and US Department of Energy developed a regulatory guide for developing design criteria for advanced reactors. The new guide was released in 2018. Other parts of the licensing process such as licensing fees and emergency planning zones, while not explicitly LWR-focused, may pose issues for SMRs.

The IAEA has encouraged the creation of an international guidance for SMR licensing. A workshop in October 2009 and another in June 2010 considered the topic, followed by an US congressional hearing in May 2010.

The NRC and the United States Department of Energy are working to define SMR licensing. The challenge of facilitating the development of SMRs is to prevent a weakening of the safety regulations: the risk of lightened regulations adopted more rapidly is to lower the safety characteristics of SMRs.

The US Advanced Reactor Demonstration Program was expected to help license and build two prototype SMRs during the 2020s, with up to $4 billion of government funding.

In July 2024, the ADVANCE Act directed the US NRC to develop a process to license and regulate microreactor designs. The Act is intended to expedite the deployment of microreactors, among other nuclear technologies.

Many SMR designs intend to use multiple identical modules at a single site, controlled from a single control room. However, NRC regulations assume that at most two reactors are controlled from a single control room. This rule is based on existing large LWRs, while many SMR designs are considered safer and simpler to operate. The NRC expects, in the short term, to allow some SMRs to deviate from this rule via a regulatory exemption. In 2020, the NRC approved a design certification for NuScale's SMR that included 12 reactor modules controlled from a single control room.

Similarly, some reactors propose highly or fully autonomous control, without human operators. Improved automation could significantly improve safety by reducing operational errors that lead to accidents. However, reactor designers will need to demonstrate sufficient human factors considerations for reactors that include a reduced number of human operators. Reactors that use automated controls will also need to satisfy cyber security requirements.

Several designs incorporate cogeneration capabilities, or are otherwise designed to provide process heat for industry rather than electricity. Regulations based primarily on electricity generation will need to take into account the use of nuclear heat during safety analysis.

== List of reactor designs ==
Numerous reactor designs have been proposed. Notable SMR designs:

Legend
| Designed or under design | Seeking license | Licensed in one or more countries | Licensed and under construction |
| Operational | Canceled | Retired | |

The stated power refers to the capacity of one reactor unless specified otherwise.

List of small nuclear reactor designs[ view/edit ]
| Name | Plant gross power (MW_{e}) | Type | Producer | Country | Status |
|---|---|---|---|---|---|
| 4S | 10–50 | SFR | Toshiba | Japan | Design (Detailed) |
| Aalo Pod | 10 (x5) | SGR | Aalo Atomics | United States | Experimental reactor under construction at INL. Graphite moderator, water and sodium cooling. |
| ACP100 Linglong One | 125 | PWR | China National Nuclear Corporation | China | Under construction |
| ACP100S | 300 | PWR | China National Nuclear Corporation | China | Feasibility study of demonstration project finished |
| ACR300 | 300 | PWR | INVAP | Argentina | Design (Detailed) |
| Advanced Micro Reactor – AMR | 3 | HTGR | STL Nuclear | South Africa | Design (Pre-conceptual) |
| AP300 | 300 | PWR | Westinghouse Electric Company | United States | Design (Detailed) |
| ARC-100 | 100 | SFR | ARC Nuclear | Canada | Design (Vendor Review) |
| ANGSTREM | 6 | LFR | OKB Gidropress | Russia | Design (Conceptual) |
| Aurora | 75 | SFR | Oklo Inc. | United States | First reactor under construction at INL. |
| B&W mPower | 195 | PWR | Babcock & Wilcox | United States | Cancelled |
| BANDI-60 | 60 | PWR | KEPCO | South Korea | Design (Detailed) |
| BLUE CAPSULE | 50 | SGR | Blue Capsule Technology | France | Preliminary studies |
| BREST-OD-300 | 300 | LFR | Atomenergoprom | Russia | Under construction |
| BWRX-300 | 300 | BWR | GE Vernova Hitachi Nuclear Energy | United States/Japan | Four units are licensed in Ontario as the Darlington New Nuclear Project. At least one unit under construction. |
| CALOGENA | 30 | PWR | Calogena S.A. | France | Design (Conceptual) |
| CANDU SMR | 300 | PHWR | Candu Energy Inc. | Canada | Design (Conceptual) |
| CAP200 | >200 | PWR | SPIC | China | Design (Completion) |
| CAREM | 27–30 | PWR | CNEA | Argentina | Seeking ARC approval for 30 MWe test SMR. Foundational construction now halted. |
| CMSR | 110 | MSR | Seaborg Technologies | Denmark | |
| Copenhagen Atomics Waste Burner | 20 | MSR | Copenhagen Atomics | Denmark | Design (Conceptual) |
| DHR400 | 400 (non-electric) | PWR | CNCC | China | Design (Conceptual) |
| EAGL-1 | 240 | LFR | First American Nuclear | United States | Design (Detailed) |
| ELENA | 0.068 | PWR | Kurchatov Institute | Russia | Design (Conceptual) |
| Energy Multiplier Module (EM^{2}) | 265 (×4) | GFR | General Atomics | United States | Pre-conceptual design complete |
| Energy Well | 8.4 | MSR | Centrum výzkumu Řež | Czechia | Design (Conceptual) |
| eVinci | 5 | HPR | Westinghouse Electric Company | United States | Design (Pre-licensing communications with the US NRC initiated.) |
| Fast Modular Reactor (FMR) | 44 | GFR | General Atomics | United States | Design (Conceptual) |
| FLEX Reactor | 24 | MSR | MoltexFLEX, Ltd. | United Kingdom | Design (Conceptual) |
| Flexblue | 160 | PWR | Areva TA / DCNS group | France | Design (Conceptual) |
| Fuji MSR | 200 | MSR | International Thorium Molten Salt Forum (ITMSF) | Japan | Design (Conceptual) |
| GTHTR300 | 100~300 | HTGR | JAEA-led | Japan | Design (Conceptual) |
| GT-MHR | 285 | HTGR | OKBM Afrikantov | Russia | Design (Completed) |
| G4M | 25 | LFR | Gen4 Energy | United States | Cancelled (Company ceased trading) |
| GT-MHR | 50 | HTGR | General Atomics, Framatome | United States/France | Design (Conceptual) |
| HAPPY200 | 200 MWt | PWR | SPIC | China | Design (Conceptual) |
| HEXANA | 150 (x2) | SFR | Hexana | France | Preliminary studies |
| HOLOS-QUAD | 10 | HTGR | HolosGen | United States | Developed detailed step-by-step installation procedure |
| HOLOS-MONO | 10 | HTGR | HolosGen | United States | Developed detailed step-by-step installation procedure |
| HTGR-POLA | 11.5 | HTGR | National Centre for Nuclear Research (NCBJ) | Poland | Design (Conceptual) |
| HTMR-100 | 35 | HTGR | Stratek Global | South Africa | Design (Conceptual) |
| HTR-10 | 2.5 | HTGR | Tsinghua University | China | Restart |
| HTR-PM | 210 (2 reactors one turbine) | HTGR | China Huaneng | China | Operational (Two reactors. Station connected to the grid in December 2021.) |
| HTR50 | 17.2 | HTGR | JAEA | Japan | Monolithic fuel element specimen irradiation test |
| HTTR | - | HTGR | JAEA | Japan | Safety demonstration test |
| IMSR400 | 195 | MSR | Terrestrial Energy | Canada | Design (Detailed) for 98 MWe (per mod), 2 module SMR |
| IRIS | 335 | PWR | Westinghouse-led | International | Design (Conceptual) |
| i-SMR | 170 | PWR | Innovative Small Modular Reactor Development Agency (KHNP and KAERI) | South Korea | Design (Conceptual) |
| JIMMY | | HTGR | JIMMY ENERGY | France | Design (Basic) |
| Kaleidos | 1 | HTGR | Radiant Nuclear | United States | Design (Detailed), test reactor under construction. |
| KLT-40S Akademik Lomonosov | 70 | PWR | OKBM Afrikantov | Russia | Operational May 2020 (floating plant) |
| KP-FHR | 140 | FHR | Kairos Power | United States | Design (Detailed), two test reactors under construction. |
| LFR-AS-200 | 200 | LFR | NewCleo | Italy/France | Design (Conceptual) |
| Lithium Fluoride Thorium Reactor | 250 | MSR | Flibe Energy | United States | Design (Conceptual) |
| MARVEL Research Microreactor | | LMR | Idaho National Laboratory | United States | Demonstration test bed |
| MMR | 5–15 | HTGR | Ultra Safe Nuclear Corporation purchased by NANO Nuclear Energy | United States/Canada | Company filed for Chapter 11 bankruptcy. Had been seeking licensing. Design acquired by Nano Nuclear Energy, who renamed the design KRONOS MMR. Applied for an NRC construction permit to build one unit at the University of Illinois Urbana-Champaign. |
| MHR-100 | 25–87 | HTGR | OKBM Afrikantov | Russia | Design (Conceptual) |
| MHR-T (Note: Multi-unit complex based on the GT-MHR reactor design) | 205.5 (x4) | HTGR | OKBM Afrikantov | Russia | Design (Conceptual) |
| MoveluX | 3~4 | HPR | Toshiba Energy Systems & Solutions | Japan | |
| MRX | 30–100 | PWR | JAERI | Japan | Design (Conceptual) |
| NOVA Core | | HTGR | Valar Atomics | United States | Design (Working prototype). Design achieved cold criticality state at LANL on 18 November 2025. |
| NP-300 | 100–300 | PWR | Areva TA | France | Design (Conceptual) |
| NuScale Power Module | 77 | PWR | NuScale Power | United States | Received NRC Standard Design Certification in 2025. 50 MW version certified in 2023. |
| Nuward | unknown | PWR | consortium | France | Design (Conceptual). In July 2024, existing design discontinued for a simpler redesign. |
| OPEN100 | 100 | PWR | Energy Impact Center | United States | Design (Conceptual) |
| PBMR | 165 | HTGR | Eskom | South Africa | Cancelled – demonstration plant postponed indefinitely |
| PeLUIt-40 | 10 | HTGR | BRIN, ITB | Indonesia | Design (Conceptual) |
| PWR-20 | 20 | PWR | Last Energy | United States | Design (Conceptual) |
| Pylon D1 | | HTGR | Ultra Safe Nuclear Corporation | United States | Design (Pre-conceptual) |
| RITM-200N | 55 | PWR | OKBM Afrikantov | Russia | Under construction |
| RITM-200S | 106 | PWR | OKBM Afrikantov | Russia | Under construction |
| Rolls-Royce SMR | 470 | PWR | Rolls-Royce | United Kingdom | Seeking UK GDA licensing in April 2022 In final stage 3 of assessment |
| Stable Salt Reactor Wasteburner | 300~900 | MSR (Static Fuelled) | Moltex Energy | Canada, United Kingdom | |
| SEALER | 55 | LFR | Blykalla | Sweden | Design |
| SHELF-M | 10 | PWR | NIKIET | Russia | Design |
| SMART100 | 110 | PWR | KAERI | South Korea | Licensed in Korea (standard design approval) |
| SMR-160 | 160 | PWR | Holtec International | United States | US NRC pre-application suspended in favor of SMR-300 design |
| SMR-300 | 300 | PWR | Holtec International | United States | Applied for an NRC construction permit for two units at Palisades. Seeking UK Generic Design Assessment. |
| SVBR-100 | 100 | LFR | OKB Gidropress | Russia | Design (Detailed) |
| SSR-W | 300–1000 | MSR | Moltex Energy | Canada | Design (Phase 1, vendor design review). |
| STAR | 10 | PWR | STAR ENERGY SA | Switzerland | Design (Detailed) |
| Stellarium | 110 | MSR | Stellaria | France | Pre-conceptual design |
| S-PRISM | 311 | SFR | GE Vernova Hitachi Nuclear Energy | United States/Japan | Design (Detailed) |
| Natrium | 345 | SFR | TerraPower | United States | Under construction as Kemmerer Unit 1. |
| Thorcon TMSR-500 | 500 | MSR | ThorCon | Indonesia | Design (Conceptual) |
| THORIZON | 100 | Modular core fast-spectrum reactor with chloride salt | THORIZON | Netherlands | Pre-conceptual design |
| U-Battery | 4 | HTGR | U-Battery consortium (Note: Urenco Group in collaboration with Jacobs and Kinectrics) | United Kingdom | Cancelled. Design archived. |
| VBER-300 | 325 | PWR | OKBM Afrikantov | Russia | Design |
| VK-300 | 250 | BWR | Atomstroyexport | Russia | Design (Detailed) |
| VVER-300 | 300 | BWR | OKB Gidropress | Russia | Design (Conceptual) |
| Westinghouse SMR | 225 | PWR | Westinghouse Electric Company | United States | Cancelled. Preliminary design completed. |
| Xe-100 | 80 | HTGR | X-energy | United States | Applied for an NRC construction permit to build a four-module plant with Dow Chemical Company. |
Updated as of 2022. Some reactors are not included in IAEA Report. Not all IAEA reactors are listed in this table. Some were added (anno 2023) that were not yet listed in the now dated IAEA report. However, new manufacturers are being added as news reports and NRC information becomes available.

== Proposed sites ==
=== Argentina ===
In February 2014, the CAREM SMR project started in Argentina with the civil engineering construction of the containment building of a prototype reactor. The CAREM acronym means Central ARgentina de Elementos Modulares. The National Atomic Energy Commission (Spanish: Comisión Nacional de Energía Atómica, CNEA), the Argentine government agency in charge of nuclear energy research and development and Nucleoeléctrica Argentina, the national nuclear energy company, are cooperating to achieve the realization of the project.

CAREM-25 is a prototype of 25 MWe, the first nuclear power plant completely designed and developed in Argentina. The project was suspended several times before being resumed. In October 2022, CNEA expected that the civil construction works would be finished by 2024. If construction continues according to plan, the first criticality of CAREM-25 is foreseen by the end of 2027.

=== Canada ===
In 2018, the Canadian province of New Brunswick announced it would invest $10 million for a demonstration project at the Point Lepreau Nuclear Generating Station. It was later announced that SMR proponents Advanced Reactor Concepts and Moltex would open offices there. One unit is scheduled for construction at Point Lepreau Nuclear Generating Station, Canada, in July 2018. Both Moltex and ARC Nuclear are vying for the contract.

On 1 December 2019, the Premiers of Ontario, New Brunswick and Saskatchewan signed a memorandum of understanding (MoU) "committing to collaborate on the development and deployment of innovative, versatile and scalable nuclear reactors, known as Small Modular Reactors (SMRs)." They were joined by the Government of Alberta in August 2020. Continued support from citizens and government officials has led to the execution of a selected SMR at the Canadian Nuclear Laboratory.

In 2021, Ontario Power Generation announced they planned to build a BWRX-300 SMR at their Darlington site to be completed by 2028. The Canadian Nuclear Safety Commission issued the construction license in 2025, and construction started soon after. As of 2026, the first unit is expected to come online by 2030.

On 11 August 2022, Invest Alberta, a Government of Alberta crown corporation, signed a MoU with Terrestrial Energy regarding IMSR in Western Canada through an interprovincial MoU it joined earlier.

=== China ===
In July 2019, China National Nuclear Corporation (CNNC) announced the start of the construction of a ACP100 SMR at the Changjiang Nuclear Power Plant in the Hainan province by the end of the year. It is the world's first commercial land-based SMR prototype. In July 2021 the start of the construction was announced, about four years later than planned. It is the first commercial on-shore SRM in China. The core module was installed in August 2023.

=== France ===
At the beginning of 2023, Électricité de France (EDF) created a new subsidiary to develop and construct a new SMR named Nuward. It was a 340 MWe design with two independent light water reactors of 170 MWe. The twin reactors were sheltered in a single containment building sharing most of their equipment. In August 2023, EDF submitted a safety case for Nuward to the autorité de sûreté nucléaire (ASN), the French safety authority.

In July 2024, EDF announced it was discontinuing the existing design process for Nuward, and will work on an SMR design based on existing rather than innovative technologies, following discussions with prospective SMR customers. In January 2025, EDF announced that the new Nuward conceptual design would be completed by mid-2026 to come to market in the 2030s, with an output of about 400 MWe and usable heat output of 100 MWt.

=== Poland ===
Polish chemical company Synthos declared plans to deploy a Hitachi BWRX-300 reactor (300 MW) in Poland by 2030. A feasibility study was completed in December 2020 and the licensing process started with the Polish National Atomic Energy Agency.

In February 2022, NuScale Power and the large mining conglomerate KGHM Polska Miedź announced signing of contract to construct a first operational reactor in Poland by 2029.

=== Romania ===
In 2019, the state-owned Romanian nuclear energy company Nuclearelectrica and NuScale Power signed a memorandum of understanding to develop NuScale SMRs in Romania. In 2022, the project was announced to be on the site of a former coal power plant, located near the village of Doicești, Dâmbovița county, 90 km North of Bucharest. The project would comprise 6 NuScale SMRs, each producing 77 MWe for a total of 462 MWe, and would be the first of its kind in Europe. The power plant would produce enough electricity for 46 thousand households and would help to avoid the release of 4 million tons of CO_{2} per year. In June 2022, US President Joe Biden announced $14 million in funding for the project. In 2026, Nuclearelectrica voted to approve the final investment decision on the project, with a targeted completion date of 2033. The project was expected to cost $6-7 billion.

=== Russia ===
Russia has started to deploy on its arctic coast small nuclear reactors embarked on board icebreakers. In May 2020, the first prototype of a floating nuclear power plant, Akademik Lomonosov-1 started operation in Pevek, Russia. The plant contains two 30 MW_{e} KLT-40S pressurized-water reactors and provides both heat and electricity. This concept is based on the design of nuclear icebreakers, and is considered the first operational SMR.

=== United Kingdom ===
In 2016, it was reported that the UK Government was assessing Welsh SMR sites – including the former Trawsfynydd nuclear power station – and on the site of former nuclear or coal-fired power stations in Northern England. Existing nuclear sites including Bradwell, Hartlepool, Heysham, Oldbury, Sizewell, Sellafield, and Wylfa were stated to be possibilities. The target cost for a 470 MWe Rolls-Royce SMR unit is £1.8 billion for the fifth unit built. In 2020, it was reported that Rolls-Royce had plans to construct up to 16 SMRs in the UK. In 2019, the company received £18 million to begin designing the modular system. An additional £210 million was awarded to Rolls-Royce by the British government in 2021, complemented by a £195 million contribution from private firms. In November 2022, Rolls-Royce announced that the sites at Trawsfynydd, Wylfa, Sellafield and Oldbury would be prioritised for assessment as potential locations for multiple SMRs.

The British government launched Great British Nuclear in July 2023 to administer a competition to create SMRs, and will co-fund any viable project.

=== United States ===
The Galena Nuclear Power Plant in Galena, Alaska, was a proposed micro nuclear reactor installation. It would have contained a Toshiba 4S reactor situated underground. As of 2011, the project had been scrapped after the development timeline was estimated to be 15 years.

The Utah Associated Municipal Power Systems (UAMPS) had partnered with Energy Northwest to explore siting a NuScale Power reactor in Idaho. Known as the Carbon Free Power Project, the project was canceled in November 2023 for cost reasons. The cost of the project had risen from $5 billion to $9 billion, causing customers to pull out of the project. NuScale said in January 2023 the target price for power from the plant was $89 per megawatt hour, up 53% from the previous estimate of $58 per MWh, raising concerns about customers' willingness to pay. Prior to its cancellation, the project had been predicted by the US Department of Energy to be the first SMR in the United States. In 2023, NuScale, which developed a light-water SMR, received the first Standard Design Certification issued by the NRC for an SMR.

In 2024, the US had nearly 4 gigawatts in announced SMR projects in addition to almost 3 GW in early development or pre-development stages, according to Utility Dive.

US company TerraPower developed a modular sodium-cooled fast reactor, the Natrium reactor, based on the PRISM SMR developed by GE Hitachi. (Note: Natrium has an electrical capacity of 345 MW, however it is still often considered an SMR.) The project couples a PRISM reactor with a molten-salt thermal energy storage system. The reactor incorporates a molten-salt thermal energy storage system that allows it to vary its power output between 500 MWe and 100 MWe, while remaining at a constant 840 MWth thermal power output. TerraPower received an $80M grant from the US Department of Energy (DOE) for development of the Natrium SFR under the Advanced Reactor Demonstration Program (ARDP). The Department of Energy later awarded $2 billion for the project by 2022. The company selected Kemmerer, Wyoming as the site for its first deployment in 2021, as Kemmerer Power Station Unit 1. TerraPower submitted a construction permit application to the NRC in 2024, and non-nuclear construction began later that year. The NRC issued the construction permit for Kemmerer Unit 1 in March 2026, and nuclear construction began in April.

The Tennessee Valley Authority (TVA) was authorized to receive an Early Site Permit (ESP) by the Nuclear Regulatory Commission for siting an SMR at its Clinch River Nuclear Site in Tennessee in December 2019. The ESP is valid for 20 years, and addresses site safety, environmental protection and emergency preparedness. It is applicable for any light-water reactor SMR design under development in the United States. In April 2025, the TVA applied for a construction permit for a BWRX-300 SMR. On 1 July 2026, the NRC recommended the permit be issued following a favorable safety determination. The permit was issued on 29 September 2026.

X-energy, an SMR developer based in Rockville, Maryland, received $80 million in 2020 from the ARDP to build four units of their 80 MWe (200 MWth) Xe-100 high-temperature gas-cooled reactor, as well as to build a fuel fabrication facility for TRISO fuel. In 2023, X-energy and the Dow Chemical Company announced the deployment of four Xe-100 SMRs, at a Dow manufacturing site in Texas, to provide both electricity and process heat. The construction permit application for the facility, to be called the Long Mott Generating Station, was submitted to the NRC in March 2025 and issued in November 2026. In 2024, Amazon announced that it would deploy four Xe-100 reactors in the state of Washington, called the Cascade Advanced Energy Facility.

In 2025, the TVA contracted Entra1 Energy to manage the building of 6 GW of NuScale SMRs on TVA's other sites. In December 2025, the Department of Energy selected the TVA and Holtec International to receive grants of $400 million each to support early deployment of advanced light-water SMRs, with an SMR defined as having output of between 50 and 350 MWe.

Kairos Power, which is developing a fluoride salt-cooled high-temperature SMR, received a construction permit from the NRC for their Hermes test reactor in Oak Ridge, Tennessee, in 2023, and construction began in 2025. In October 2024, Google agreed to commission multiple small modular reactors from Kairos to power its AI data centers, with the first to be operational in 2030. Kairos received a construction permit in November 2024 to build a two-reactor plant, Hermes 2, to supply 50 MW of electricity to Google and the TVA grid. The company broke ground on the site in April 2026.

Another developer, Oklo, has developed a sodium-cooled SMR, the Aurora Powerhouse. In 2025, they were selected under the DOE's Reactor Pilot Program to build the first unit at Idaho National Laboratory. The company broke ground on the reactor, Aurora-INL, in September 2025.

In 2026, Antares Nuclear announced that their Mark-0 test reactor had achieved zero-power (cold) criticality, claiming to be the first privately developed, non-light-water reactor to do so. Soon after, Valar Atomics announced that their 5 MW Ward-250 test reactor had reached cold criticality. In July 2026, Deployable Energy, another SMR developer, announced their Unity test reactor had also gone cold critical. The reactors were reported as having achieved Donald Trump's goal of three reactors achieving criticality by July 4.

The US Army announced in 2026 that under its Janus Program, it would spend up to $2.2 billion to help fund the development of five microreactors from five separate companies, with plans to install an SMR at five bases across the country. The reactors would be built by Antares Nuclear for Fort Bragg; BWX Technologies at Fort Campbell; General Atomics at Fort Hood; Radiant Industries for Fort Benning; and Westinghouse Government Services at Fort Drum.
