= Rolls-Royce SMR =

Nuclear reactor design

- Status: Regulatory Assessment

Main parameters of the reactor core
- Fuel (fissile material): ^{235}U
- Primary moderator: light water
- Primary coolant: light water

Reactor usage
- Operator/owner: Rolls-Royce Holdings (57.8% indirect shareholding, December 2025)
- Website: www.rolls-royce-smr.com

The Rolls-Royce SMR, also known as the UK SMR, is a small modular reactor (SMR) design being developed by the Rolls-Royce (RR) company in the United Kingdom.

The company has been given financial support by the UK Government to develop its design. In 2019 it was estimated that the 470 MWe units would cost around £1.8 billion, or £3.3 billion per GW, once in full production. By comparison, the planned 3,200 MWe Sizewell C is projected to cost £35 billion, or £10.3 billion per GW. Construction time and site size needed would also be lower.

== History ==
RR began design work on the SMR c. 2015 with a team of about 150 people, with decisions made near the start of the project to use light water (Note: The term light water is used to specifically distinguish from heavy water in the context of a nuclear reactor) as both coolant and moderator.

In 2016, it was reported that the UK Government was assessing Welsh SMR sites – including the former Trawsfynydd nuclear power station – and on the site of former nuclear or coal-fired power stations in Northern England. Existing nuclear sites including Bradwell, Hartlepool, Heysham, Oldbury, Sizewell, Sellafield and Wylfa were stated to be possibilities.

In 2017, the consortium headed by RR needed to seek UK government finance to support further development. In December 2017 The UK government provided funding of up to £56 million over three years to support SMR research and development.

In 2018, the UK SMR industry sought billions of pounds of government support to finance their putative First of a Kind projects. The Expert Finance Working Group on Small Reactors produced a report stating that there was "a current market failure in supporting nuclear projects generally" and identifying options for government to support SMR development in the UK. In 2019, the government committed a further £18 million to the development from its Industrial Strategy Challenge Fund, to begin designing the modular system. In November 2021, the UK government provided funding of £210 million to further develop the design, partly matched by £195 million of investment by Rolls-Royce Group, BNF Resources UK Limited and Exelon Generation Limited. At that point they expected the first unit would be completed in the early 2030s.

In 2022, the CEO stated that the Rolls-Royce SMR investment business case was based on selling many hundreds of SMRs by 2050.

On 1 April 2022, the regulatory Generic Design Assessment (GDA) of the Rolls-Royce SMR started. The assessment will begin once the timescales and resources have been agreed. The assessment is likely to take about four years, and be complete by 2026.

In October 2022, Rolls-Royce announced that it was exploring eight possible sites in the UK to build the first of three expected factories for parts of the SMR. In November 2022, four sites were identified suitable for multiple SMR units: Trawsfynydd, Sellafield, near Wylfa, and near Oldbury.

In March 2023, Rolls-Royce stated that the current programme funding of £500 million will run out by the end of 2024, and requested negotiations with the UK government to find fresh investment. Hiring of new staff was stopped. About 600 staff work on the programme in Derby, Warrington and Manchester. At the end of March 2023, the CEO and finance officer of the SMR unit were replaced by the newly appointed CEO of Rolls-Royce.

In July 2023, Energy Secretary Grant Shapps said he was launching an international competition to select up to four different SMR technologies "to go through to the final design stage", supported by up to £157 million of finance. He said the final investment decision will be taken by the next parliament, and UK SMRs might start operating by the 2030s.

As of November 2023, Rolls-Royce owned 76% of Rolls-Royce SMR Limited, with minority investments by the Perrodo family 11%, Qatar 10% and Constellation Energy 3%.

In April 2024, Rolls-Royce announced it had dropped plans to build a SMR pressure vessel factory, instead buying them from a third party supplier, with Sheffield Forgemasters in the UK being a possible supplier. In 2024, the cost of each SMR was expected to be between £2 billion and £3 billion.

In August 2024, Rolls-Royce SMR stated it was seeking further investment, for a stake in the subsidiary, to finance the company in 2025. In October 2024, the ČEZ Group took a 20% stake in Rolls-Royce SMR at a cost of "several hundred million pounds"; ČEZ plan to deploy up to 3 GWe of SMR generation capacity in the 2030s in the Czech Republic.

In February 2026, the Japanese company Yokogawa Electric was contracted to provide the control systems for the first Rolls-Royce SMRs to be built; they have a UK design facility in Runcorn.

In April 2026, Rolls-Royce secured up to £599 million from the United Kingdom's national wealth fund to support development of its small modular reactors, with initial plans for Wylfa.

In April 2026, a contract to prepare a site-specific design for three SMRs at Wylfa, including engagement with planning and regulatory bodies, was signed between Rolls-Royce and Great British Energy - Nuclear (representing the British government). This is in preparation for a final investment decision, expected in 2029.

In May 2026, Rolls-Royce SMR chose Škoda JS and Doosan Enerbility to do pre-production work on key nuclear island parts, including reactor pressure vessels and associated parts. A dual supplier approach was taken to reduce supplier risk. This decision received criticism from UK politicians and industry, in particular how it was compatible with the government's target of 70% of the project being made in Britain.

In June 2026, Videberg Kraft chose three Rolls-Royce SMRs for a planned new nuclear power project in Sweden near Ringhals Nuclear Power Plant. The Swedish government and state-owned Vattenfall will provide 80% of the capital cost.

In September 2026, Czech engineering company Škoda JS was selected as the sole supplier of control rod drive mechanisms and the associated reactor control system. Each reactor is designed to use 89 drive mechanisms to position its control rod assemblies.

=== Regulatory History ===
The Rolls-Royce SMR is going through the United Kingdom's Generic Design Assessment (GDA). The assessment is carried out by the Office for Nuclear Regulation, the Environment Agency and Natural Resources Wales.

Stage	Status	Date	Citation
Entry into GDA	Completed	April 2022	
Step 1	Completed	April 2022 to April 2023	
Step 2	Completed	April 2023 to July 2024	
Step 3	Ongoing	Started July 2024	
Regulatory justification	Approved	March 2026	

== Design ==
External image
- Cross section of Rolls-Royce SMR (CGI render)

RR is preparing a small modular reactor (SMR) design called the UK SMR, a close-coupled three-loop pressurised water reactor (PWR) design. Power output was initially designed to be 440 MWe, and subsequently increased to 470 MWe which is above the usual range considered to be a SMR. It should be able to power a city the size of Sheffield. The planning documents for the projects (by Rolls-Royce SMR co-owner ČEZ) for Temelín and Tušimice assume an output of 498 MWe.

=== Design approach ===
Rolls-Royce SMR is based on proven PWR technology and is designed to reduce cost and delivery risk through modular construction, standardisation, factory assembly and repeatable build methods. The design also uses existing nuclear components where possible.

=== Design Features ===
The SMR has a relatively large power output which has been maximised by specifying the largest components transportable by road.

A modular forced draft cooling tower will be used.

The intended fuel is uranium dioxide (UO_{2}). The fuel assembly design is a shortened version of on an existing Westinghouse 17×17 PWR fuel assembly and changed to have instrumentation fitted from above.

=== Novel Design Features ===
The design targets a 500-day construction time, on a 10 acres (4 ha) site. Overall build time is expected to be four years, two years for site preparation and two years for construction and commissioning.

Unlike typical PWRs, the Rolls-Royce SMR is designed not to use soluble boron during normal operations, but as a backup safety measure boron may be injected in emergencies if the reactor does not shut down as intended. This has the added benefit of reducing tritium production

Potassium hydroxide is used as a pH raiser instead of lithium hydroxide typically used in PWRs, to reduce tritium production.

The seismic isolation bearings allow for ground movements and seismic events. They also have been designed to provide a standard interface between the site-specific foundations below and the standardised plant architecture above, enabling the standard design to be repeated across sites with different ground conditions.

The Rolls-Royce SMR is designed to have a compact foot-print so that it can be assembled on site inside a weatherproof canopy. According to the Advanced Manufacturing Research Centre this should reduce cost and project risk by avoiding weather disruption.

== Cost ==
In 2020, the original target cost for a 470 MWe Rolls-Royce SMR unit was £1.8 billion for the fifth unit built, or around £3.8 million per MWe. As a comparison the estimated cost for the full-size 3.3 GWe Sizewell C nuclear power station was £22 billion, or around £6.7 million per MWe. In 2024, the SMR cost was expected to be between £2 billion and £3 billion.

In April 2026, Alastair Evans, Director of Corporate Affairs at Rolls-Royce SMR, told the UK parliamentary Energy Security and Net Zero Committee that the whole-life cost of the Wylfa project had not yet been finalised. He said that Rolls-Royce SMR and Great British Energy – Nuclear would develop costs covering site preparation, licensing, establishing the operator, and decommissioning, with the overall cost determined before the final investment decision.

== Sites ==
=== Selected site ===
- Wylfa/Gwyndod, Ynys Môn/Anglesey, Wales – In November 2025, the UK government announced that Wylfa had been chosen for Great British Energy–Nuclear's first SMR project. The Wylfa project has subsequently been named Gwyndod. The first project is for up to three Rolls-Royce SMR units. The site has also been assessed as having potential for up to eight units. In April 2026, Great British Energy – Nuclear and Rolls-Royce SMR signed a contract allowing site-specific design, regulatory engagement and planning work to begin, ahead of a final investment decision.

=== Site at early works stage ===
- Temelín, South Bohemia, Czech Republic – In April 2026, ČEZ and Rolls-Royce SMR signed an early works contract for a Rolls-Royce SMR project at the existing Temelín nuclear power plant site. This includes site-specific design and preparation for consents, permitting and licensing. This is a preparatory stage and is not the same as final approval for construction.

=== Planned sites ===
- Värö Peninsula, Halland County, Sweden – In June 2026, Videberg Kraft chose Rolls-Royce SMR as supplier for a planned project near Ringhals. The project is planned to use three Rolls-Royce SMR units.

=== Additional proposed sites ===
- Tušimice, Ústí nad Labem Region, Czech Republic and Dětmarovice, Moravian-Silesian Region, Czech Republic – In July 2026, the Czech Ministry of Industry and Trade, ČEZ and Rolls-Royce SMR signed a memorandum of understanding enabling preparatory work for SMR projects at the two sites. The Czech government said that, together with Temelín, the sites could accommodate up to six Rolls-Royce SMR units with a combined capacity of up to 3 GW. Decisions on the timetable and construction of the additional units are expected in 2028.

== See also ==
- List of small modular reactor designs
- Nuclear power in the United Kingdom
- U-Battery, a micro-SMR development also supported by the UK Government
