= Nuclear microreactor =

Very small nuclear reactor of 1-20 MW capacity

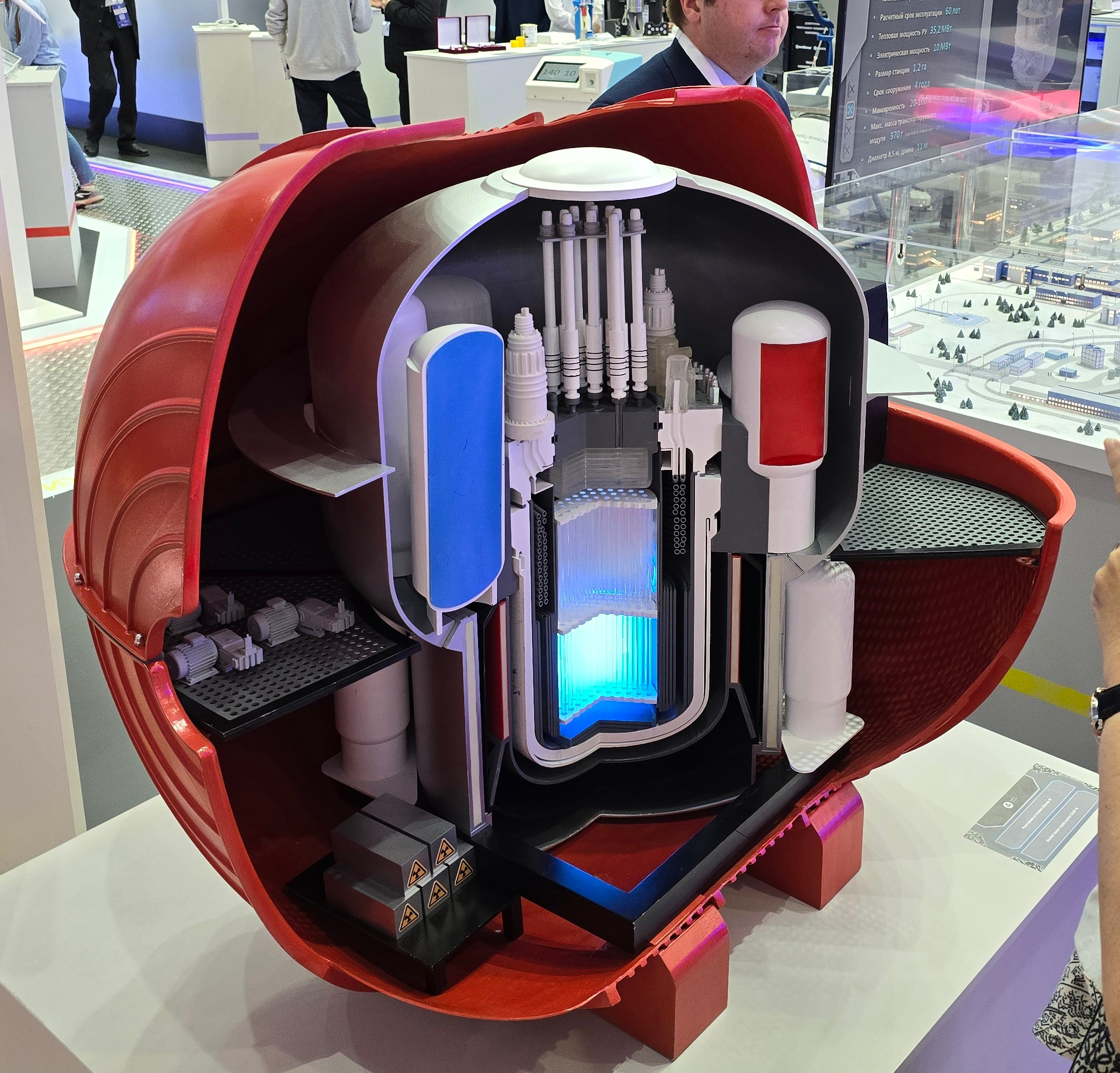
Russian nuclear microreactor Shelf-M

A nuclear microreactor is a type of nuclear reactor which can be easily assembled and transported by road, rail or air. Microreactors are 100 to 1,000 times smaller than conventional nuclear reactors, and range in capacity from 1 to 20 MWe (megawatts of electricity), compared to 20 to 300 MWe (megawatts of electricity) for small modular reactors (SMRs). Due to their size, they can be deployed to locations such as isolated military bases or communities affected by natural disasters. They can operate as part of the grid, independent of the grid, or as part of a small grid for electricity generation and heat treatment. They are designed to provide resilient, non-carbon emitting, and independent power in challenging environments. The nuclear fuel source for the majority of the designs is "high-assay low-enriched uranium", or HALEU.

== History ==
Nuclear microreactors originated in the United States Navy's nuclear submarine project, which was first proposed by Ross Gunn of United States Naval Research Laboratory in 1939. The concept was adapted by Admiral Hyman Rickover to start the American nuclear submarine program in the 1950s. The first US nuclear submarine to be constructed was the USS Nautilus, which was launched in 1955. It was installed with Westinghouse's S2W reactor - a pressurized water type reactor which gave out 10 megawatts output.

== Design ==
These reactors are made to fit in small areas where it would be inefficient to introduce a larger power plant, but have energy needs unsuitable for generators. Nuclear microreactors, a subcategory of Small Modular Reactors (SMRs), are a developing type of nuclear power plant designed to generate electricity on a smaller scale than traditional nuclear reactors. These microreactors typically have a capacity of 20 megawatts or less and are designed to be modular and transportable, making them suitable for powering small communities, remote areas, and industries such as desalinization and hydrogen fuel production.

One of the primary advantages of nuclear microreactors is that they have a lower environmental impact than fossil fuels. They emit no greenhouse gases such as CO_{2} and methane. The waste they produce is radioactive however, creating an issue of safe handling and disposal. One of the current methods of disposal is burying waste in deep underground storage facilities such as Onkalo in Finland. In addition, they can operate continuously for up to 10 years without the need for refueling.

Microreactors use nuclear fission to generate heat, which is then used to produce electricity through a steam turbine. The reactor core is surrounded by a thick shield to protect workers and the environment from radiation. The core also contains fuel rods made of uranium or other fissile materials. As the fuel undergoes fission, it releases energy in the form of heat, which is then transferred to a coolant that circulates through the reactor. The coolant is typically water or a liquid metal, such as sodium or lead, which absorbs the heat and transfers it to a heat exchanger. The heat exchanger then transfers the heat to a secondary coolant, which is used to generate steam and produce electricity.

Microreactors and SMRs reflect a wide range of technologies, including light-water reactors (LWRs), high-temperature gas reactors (HTGRs), and advanced reactor designs, such as liquid metal fast reactors (FRs), molten salt reactors (MSRs), and heat pipe reactors (HPRs). Designs can vary based on fuel, materials, refrigerants, inverters, manufacturing techniques (such as additive manufacturing), and heat exchangers.

Heat pipe reactor design is the simplest microreactor, which improves power transfer and avoids the use of pumps to circulate the coolant. Microreactors based on HTGR technology use a three-structure isotropic (TRISO) fuel, the same as that used in larger HTGR designs. For FR technologies that provide compactness and energy efficiency, proven oxide fuels, more experimental metals or nitride fuels are available. The experimental fuel is expected to be more efficient for microreactors, as the residence time of the fuel in the reactor core is much longer than in conventional reactors, leading to higher radiation exposure.

One of the key features of nuclear microreactors is their small size and modularity. SMRs can be built in factories and shipped to their final destination, reducing construction costs and time. They can be installed underground, underwater, or in other remote locations, making them ideal for powering small communities, industrial sites, military installations, and other specialized locations. In addition, the modular design allows for easy scalability, allowing additional microreactors to be added to increase power output as needed.

The environmental impact of reducing greenhouse gases and the capability of outputting low powers of less than 100 MWth have caused global interest in nuclear microreactors, which could potentially benefit companies with lower control necessities. Additional benefits could include expanded adaptability with regard to siting, progressed security execution; diminished development times; and decreased forthright venture necessities.

=== Challenges ===
Despite these advantages, nuclear microreactors still face challenges. One of the primary challenges is regulatory approval. SMRs must undergo extensive testing and certification before they can be deployed, and many countries have strict regulations in place to govern the use of SMRs such as those given by the U.S. Nuclear Regulatory Commission (NRC). The most profound issue for microreactors is the cost per kWh, as microreactors lose the power-of-scale advantages for economic efficiency. Design, operation and maintenance costs can make these low-power nuclear reactors prohibitively expensive. Economic analysis shows that despite lower capital costs, microreactors cannot compete in cost with large nuclear power plants due to economies of scale. Still, they can compete with technologies of similar size and application, such as diesel generators in small networks and renewable energies.

In addition, public perception of nuclear energy is often negative, with concerns about safety and nuclear waste disposal. The availability of High Assay Low-Enriched Uranium (HALEU) fuel on the commercial market is low, posing an issue to the viability of operating microreactors even if regulatory approval is attained. Other issues include the higher safety and proliferation risks compared to large nuclear power plants and the licensing requirements for small reactors that have yet to be established.

== Current development ==
Microreactors for civilian use are currently in the earliest stages of development, with individual designs ranging in various stages of maturity. The United States has been supporting the development of any form of SMR since 2012. The present work focuses on the feasibility of combining coolants commonly considered for fast reactor applications, such as sodium, molten salt, and lead-based coolants, with intermediates and special attention to molten salt, from a basic design perspective. Future work focuses on optimizing the basic design and performing coupled 3D calculations, like thermohydraulics, fuel performance, and neutronics to determine detailed behavior and operation.

As of 2010, there has also been a growing interest in mobile floating nuclear power plants, considered to be nuclear microreactors. Two recent notable examples are: The Russian plant Akademik Lomonosov, which utilizes two 35 MWe reactors, and the Chinese plant ACPR50S, which utilizes a 60 MWe reactor, classified as a marine pressurized water reactor. In addition to the Akademik Lomonosov plant, several new designs of autonomous power sources are being studied in Russia.

In 2018, NASA successfully demonstrated a kilowatt-scale microreactor based on its Kilopower technology. It is being developed for supporting human exploration of the Moon and Mars missions. It uses a unique technological approach to cool the reactor core (which is about the size of a paper towel roll): airtight heat pipes transfer reactor heat to engines that convert the heat to electricity. The approach to discovering the coolant fuel used for reactor cores was found through a series of scoping calculations, which utilize reactor vessel and internal dimensions, followed by calculating vibrations and hypothetical core-disruptive accidents.

In April 2022, the US Department of Defense announced its approval of Project Pele, an initiative to lower carbon emissions by the DOD by investing in nuclear technologies. The project has a budget of $300 million to develop a miniaturized reactor capable of generating 1.5 megawatts for a minimum of three years. The US Department of Strategic Capabilities partnered with BWXT Technologies in June 2022 to accomplish this. BWXT Tech developed a high-temperature gas-cooled reactor (HTGR) which will generate between 1 and 5 MWe and will be transportable in shipping containers. It will be powered by TRISO fuel, a specific design of high-assay low-enriched uranium (HALEU) fuel that can withstand high temperatures and has relatively low environmental risks.

The US Department of Energy (DOE) is also currently planning on developing a 100 kWt reactor in Idaho called the "Microreactor Applications Research Validation and Evaluation" (MARVEL) reactor.

The US Department of Defense anticipates deadlines and challenges for the deployment of the first small reactor by the end of 2027. The nominal time from license application to commercialization is estimated at 7 years.

In February 2026, first air transport of nuclear microreactor was carried out by the US to show viability of the technology.

Under a Trump Administration initiative, DOE's Idaho National Laboratory validated fueled criticality (self-sustaining operation), without power output, of three new microreactors in 2026, before the US's 250th birthday. Each reactor is a planned commercial products of three different US companies:

- The "Mark-0" from Antares Nuclear
- The "Ward 250" from Valar Atomics
- The 1MWe "Unity" from Deployable Energy

Several other companies are also taking new microreactor designs through this program.

In April 2026, the US Air Force tapped Radiant Nuclear, Westinghouse Government Services, and Antares Nuclear to provide microreactors for military bases. Each contractor is to develop a reactor on a single base, with Radiant assigned to Buckley Space Force Base, Westinghouse assigned to Malmstrom Air Force Base, and Antares assigned to Joint Base San Antonio.

The US Army announced in 2026 that under its Janus Program, it would spend up to $2.2 billion to help fund the development of five microreactors from five separate companies, with plans to install an SMR at five bases across the country. The reactors will be built by Antares for Fort Bragg; BWX Technologies at Fort Campbell; General Atomics at Fort Hood; Radiant for Fort Benning; and Westinghouse at Fort Drum.
