= Radiant Nuclear =

American nuclear technology company

Radiant Industries Inc.
- Type: Private
- Industry: Nuclear power
- Founded: 2020; 6 years ago in El Segundo, California, United States
- Founders: Doug Bernauer; Bob Urberger
- Headquarters: El Segundo, California, United States
- Key people: Doug Bernauer (CEO); Tori Shivanandan (president and COO); Rita Baranwal (chief nuclear officer); Mike Starrett (CCO)
- Products: Small modular reactors
- Number of employees: 100 (2025)
- Website: radiantnuclear.com

Radiant Industries Inc., commonly known as Radiant Nuclear, is an American nuclear energy company based in El Segundo, California, that designs and markets small modular reactors. The company is developing a 1 MW_{e} portable microreactor called Kaleidos. The reactor is intended to replace diesel generators in hospitals, remote areas, or military bases.

The company's Kaleidos microreactor is a high-temperature, gas-cooled design using helium coolant and TRISO fuel. The reactor is designed to fit in a single shipping container and be transportable by truck, cargo aircraft, or ship. To increase flexibility, Radiant's reactors use air cooling instead of water and are designed to avoid significant on-site construction. Each reactor is designed to run for five years between refueling, after which it is returned to the factory to be refurbished and redeployed.

As of 2026, Radiant has raised over $575 million in private funding. Radiant was selected by the US Department of Energy in 2025 to build a demonstration reactor at Idaho National Laboratory. Its demonstration unit was shipped to the laboratory in August 2026. The company signed an agreement with the US Air Force to build a commercial unit at Buckley Space Force Base, and says it was awarded $750 million by the US Army for up to 15 Kaleidos units, including at least one at Fort Benning. Data center company Equinix also signed a pre-order agreement for 20 reactors.

Radiant is constructing a microreactor factory in Oak Ridge, Tennessee called R-50, near the site of the K-25 plant. The company originally considered Bar Nunn, Wyoming, but announced it was moving to Oak Ridge due to Wyoming law restricting storage of spent nuclear fuel. The storage of spent fuel from outside Wyoming had attracted significant controversy in Bar Nunn, and was particularly criticized by the Wyoming Freedom Caucus.

== History ==
=== Early history ===
Doug Bernauer, an engineer at SpaceX, founded Radiant in 2020 with two colleagues, including Bob Urberger. According to Bernauer, he had investigated power generation options on Mars, and found that no companies manufactured small nuclear reactors for space use. Bernauer tried to develop a nuclear program at SpaceX before founding Radiant instead. In 2020, the company raised $1.2 million from angel investors. According to Radiant, the company was initially run out of a former dance studio, before moving into a former Hughes Aerospace warehouse in El Segundo.

=== DOME demonstration ===
In 2023, Radiant was awarded $3.9 million for front-end engineering and experiment design, shared with two other developers, by the US Department of Energy (DOE). The money was awarded to support a demonstration of its Kaleidos reactor at Idaho National Laboratory. The program, Demonstration of Microreactor Experiments (DOME), aims to use the former containment dome of EBR-II to test microreactors. On July 1, 2025, the DOE jointly selected Radiant and Westinghouse to lead the first test campaigns, with Radiant running the first test. Radiant was selected by the DOE in 2025 to receive high-assay low-enriched uranium (HALEU) fuel for its first reactor demonstration, the Kaleidos Development Unit (KDU) which the company expected to begin in 2026. The DOE approved Radiant's Preliminary Documented Safety Analysis in February 2026, and the company took possession of the DOME facility soon after. The KDU will be authorized by the DOE, instead of a commercial license from the Nuclear Regulatory Commission (NRC). Radiant received its first shipment of TRISO fuel, which had been fabricated by Standard Nuclear, for KDU in July 2026. On August 12, the KDU reactor was shipped to DOME from its facility in El Segundo on a specialized trailer. The company's test plan calls for at least 150 consecutive hours at full power without operator intervention.

=== Commercial contracts ===
In August 2025, the US Air Force and the Defense Innovation Unit signed an agreement with Radiant to deliver a reactor unit by 2028, as part of its Advanced Nuclear Power for Installations (ANPI) program. Shortly afterward, Equinix, a data center company, signed a pre-order agreement to purchase 20 Kaleidos microreactors from Radiant. The following year, the Air Force announced that it had selected Buckley Space Force Base as the location for Radiant's reactor, expected to enter operation in 2028. The Buckley reactor will be licensed under a commercial NRC license, as with all projects under the ANPI.

In August 2026, the US Army announced that it had selected Radiant to build at least one microreactor at Fort Benning, as part of its Janus Program. The program awarded up to $2.2 billion in total to five companies, with funding contingent on performance milestones. Radiant said it was awarded $750 million to construct up to 15 Kaleidos units. According to POWER magazine, reactors under the Janus Program will be authorized directly by the Army's regulatory authorities, rather than by the DOE or NRC. Radiant also signed an agreement with Standard Nuclear to fabricate TRISO fuel for planned Kaleidos units through the early 2030s. In September 2026, the company signed a multi-year contract with Centrus Energy to supply HALEU for multiple commercial Kaleidos reactors.

=== R-50 factory ===
In 2024, Radiant was reported to be examining Wyoming, Utah, Tennessee, Montana, and Idaho as locations to build a microreactor factory. The following year, Radiant selected Bar Nunn, Wyoming as its preferred site to build the facility, aiming to complete it by 2028. Radiant would have fabricated its reactors there before shipping them to a customer site. The project attracted controversy among Bar Nunn residents. While the assembly of nuclear reactors did not attract significant opposition, residents and state legislators including Bill Allemand expressed concerns about the storage of spent nuclear fuel from other states. Wyoming state law bans the storage of spent fuel unless it is produced in-state, which would have prevented Radiant from shipping its reactors back to Wyoming to be defueled. A bill to create an exception for reactor manufacturers was defeated in the 2025 legislative session, and a revised draft was taken up by an interim committee. The proposed factory also attracted significant opposition from the Wyoming Freedom Caucus, with chair Rachel Rodriguez-Williams saying that "California billionaires insist on saddling our landscapes with their windmills, their solar panels and now their radioactive waste". Several months later, Radiant cancelled the proposed facility in Bar Nunn in favor of one in Oak Ridge, Tennessee. The factory, to be called R-50, will be built on the former K-27 and K-29 gaseous diffusion plants, part of the K-25 complex built for the Manhattan Project. The company cited Wyoming state law as the reason for the change. The opposition, particularly from the Freedom Caucus, itself provoked criticism from Bar Nunn mayor Peter Boyer, as well as Wyoming governor Mark Gordon and state Senator Ed Cooper.

Radiant applied for a permit for the R-50 factory from the NRC in early 2026. The permit, under 10 CFR Part 70, allows the facility to possess and use special nuclear material. The NRC anticipated completing its review by the end of 2026. The R-50 facility is intended to produce and fuel Kaleidos reactors before shipping them to customers. The facility is intended to produce up to 50 reactors per year, and construction is underway as of 2026. Radiant was selected for the DOE's Nuclear Energy Launch Pad initiative in April 2026; according to Baranwal, the program will authorize the company to build, fuel, and test its first Kaleidos reactors at R-50.

== Kaleidos reactor ==
The Kaleidos reactor is a 1 MW_{e} microreactor, designed for off-grid power generation. A high-temperature gas-cooled reactor, it uses TRISO fuel, consisting of ceramic-coated particles of uranium. Each particle is composed of a kernel of uranium oxycarbide coated with layers of carbon and silicon carbide; the particles are then pressed into graphite compacts. TRISO particles can tolerate temperatures exceeding 3,000 °F (1,650 °C) without damage. The reactor uses passive cooling, which dissipates heat without requiring electricity, combined with TRISO fuel to achieve a high degree of nuclear safety, according to April Novak, an Argonne National Laboratory engineer who has worked with Radiant on the design. Todd Allen, chair of the department of nuclear engineering at the University of Michigan, stated that the safety of Kaleidos and similar microreactors is on par with those of research reactors on college campuses. Kaleidos reactors use zirconium hydride embedded within graphite blocks as their neutron moderator, allowing for compact design. The reactor uses inert helium gas as its coolant. It uses integrated fans to avoid using water for cooling, along with a passive air jacket driven by natural circulation to remove core heat.

Radiant has targeted minimal on-site construction, dry air cooling, and factory fabrication as key features. Each reactor is packaged in a single shipping container, containing the reactor, generator, and cooling system. Radiant's reactors are intended to be transportable by truck, cargo aircraft, or ship, without requiring specialized infrastructure. They would be installed on prepared pads and operated for years without refueling. The reactor is designed to be shipped to a customer's site and installed with minimal setup. According to Radiant, in many instances the reactor's deployments will be temporary. The company has stated that when deployment ends, the reactor would be picked up and shipped back to its factory. For longer deployments, the reactor will be shipped back, refueled, and returned to a customer site.

Radiant intends for its Kaleidos reactors to replace diesel generators, providing power to hospitals, military bases, data centers, or remote communities. The company expects that its reactors will be competitive with diesel generators in places where diesel fuel costs more than $6.50 per gallon.

Kaleidos reactors are designed to operate for five years between each refueling, with each unit expected to last 20 years. The company intends to bring spent nuclear fuel from its reactors back to its central fueling facility. Radiant has stated that the spent nuclear fuel remains entirely within the container while on a customer's site, being removed and replaced at the company's facility.

== Corporate affairs ==
The company's chief executive officer is Doug Bernauer. Tori Shivanandan serves as president and chief operating officer, while Mike Starrett is the chief commercial officer.

According to Radiant, Bernauer provided some of the company's initial funding. In 2023, the company raised $40 million in a Series B funding round led by Andreessen Horowitz. Radiant raised $165 million in a Series C funding round led by DCVC, which closed in June 2025. That year, it hired Rita Baranwal, the former Assistant Secretary of Energy for Nuclear Energy, as its Chief Nuclear Officer. Radiant raised over $300 million in a Series D round announced in December 2025. By 2026, Radiant had raised over $575 million overall.

== See also ==
- List of small modular reactor designs
- ML-1
- Project Pele
