= ADVANCE Act =

US energy legislation

Accelerating Deployment of Versatile, Advanced Nuclear for Clean Energy Act of 2023
- Other short titles: ADVANCE Act of 2023
- Long title: A bill to enhance United States civil nuclear leadership, support the licensing of advanced nuclear technologies, strengthen the domestic nuclear energy fuel cycle and supply chain, and improve the regulation of nuclear energy, and for other purposes.
- Enacted by: the 118th United States Congress

Citations
- Public law: Pub. L. 118–67 (text) (PDF), Division B

Legislative history
- Introduced in the United States Senate as S. 1111 by Shelley Moore Capito (R–WV) on March 30, 2023; Committee consideration by United States Senate Committee on Environment and Public Works; Signed into law by President Joe Biden on July 9, 2024

Atomic Energy Advancement Act
- Long title: To advance the benefits of nuclear energy by enabling efficient, timely, and predictable licensing, regulation, and deployment of nuclear energy technologies, and for other purposes.

Legislative history
- Introduced in the House of Representatives as H.R. 6544 by Jeff Duncan (R–SC) on December 1, 2023; Committee consideration by United States House Committee on Energy and Commerce; Passed the House of Representatives on February 28, 2024

The Accelerating Deployment of Versatile, Advanced Nuclear for Clean Energy Act of 2024, or the ADVANCE Act of 2024, is a piece of legislation passed by the 118th United States Congress to accelerate the development of generation IV nuclear reactor technology and keep existing United States nuclear electric power plants online. The Act was introduced in the Senate by Shelley Moore Capito in March 2023 as the ADVANCE Act of 2023. The bill was passed by the Senate in June 2024. A companion bill, the Atomic Energy Advancement Act, similarly reducing licensing fees for advanced nuclear technologies and opposing the Chinese and Russian nuclear sector, passed in the House of Representatives in February 2024. It was not passed alone; the ADVANCE Act was incorporated into the Fire Grants and Safety Act, a reauthorization signed into law on July 9, 2024.

The act is considered one of the most important federal clean energy measures since the Inflation Reduction Act.

== Political climate ==
The bill passed amid bipartisan support for nuclear energy, which is popular with Democrats as a means to decarbonize electrical generation and with Republicans for jobs and reliable base load electricity. Chairman Tom Carper (D‑DE) of the Senate Environment and Public Works Committee called it "a major victory for our climate and American energy security", and ranking member Shelley Moore Capito (R‑WV) described nuclear energy as important to the country. Both praised the bipartisan support for the bill, which passed the Senate 88–2. (The House version passed 393–13.)

High costs, complex permitting requirements, and development difficulties for advanced nuclear reactors have slowed US nuclear expansion in recent decades. Companies such as TerraPower, which was awaiting in July 2024 a permit for its Natrium reactor in Wyoming, stand to benefit from permitting reforms. Large, traditional reactor designs have struggled; Vogtle Electric Generating Plant units 3 and 4, the first to come online in decades, did so years behind schedule and at a cost of about $35 billion; the original budget was $14 billion.

Climate advocates are divided on the utility of nuclear power, which does not directly emit greenhouse gasses. Critics note that small modular reactors (SMRs), which promise lowered capital and space requirements, are not commercially ready. Cost overruns and uncertain permitting times have hindered nuclear development. However, nuclear fission offers a steady complement to intermittent renewable energy sources such as solar and wind.

Non-proliferation advocates, such as the Union of Concerned Scientists, warned against relaxed licensing for advanced nuclear reactors, such as those fueled by high-assay low-enriched uranium (HALEU). Small advanced reactors require such fuel. Edwin Lyman of the UCS stated that the ADVANCE Act would increase risks downwind of nuclear facilities.

The act's support of US nuclear exports and prohibition of Russian and Chinese nuclear fuels come after May 2024's Prohibiting Russian Uranium Imports Act, which aims to reduce global dependency on Russian fuel supplies.

== Legislative history ==
The ADVANCE Act was introduced in the Senate on March 30, 2023, by Senator Shelley Moore Capito (R‑WV). It was co-sponsored by a bipartisan group of senators, which included 9 Democrats, 8 Republicans and 2 Independents.

House vote
Party	Yes	No	Present	Not voting
Republican	195	12	—	10
Democratic	198	1	1	13
Total votes	✓ 393	13	1	23

On May 8, 2024, the House of Representatives took up the Fire Grants and Safety Act, which incorporated the provisions of the ADVANCE Act and the Atomic Energy Advancement Act. The House passed the bill with overwhelming support, achieving a vote of 393–13 under a House procedure called “suspension of the rules” which is typically used to pass non-controversial bills. Votes under suspension require a 2/3rds majority.

Senate vote
Party	Yes	No	Present	Not voting
Democratic	45	2	—	4
Republican	43	—	—	6
Total votes	✓ 88	2	—	10

Following the House’s passage, the Senate debated the legislation, which retained the core provisions of the ADVANCE Act. On June 18, 2024, the Senate voted in favor of the bill, with an overwhelming margin of 88–2.

On July 9, 2024, President Joe Biden signed the ADVANCE Act into law.

== Provisions ==
According to its official summary at Congress.gov, the ADVANCE Act's provisions are intended to support the development and deployment of advanced nuclear fuels in the US and allied countries, restrict enriched uranium imports from Russia and China, remediate contaminated lands, and "establish related requirements". The act includes,

- incentives for nuclear technology development and deployment, with prize awards for deployment and reduced fees for licensing
- extension through 2045 of the nuclear industry liability limitations in indemnification policy of the Price-Anderson Act
- a requirement for the Nuclear Regulatory Commission (NRC) to develop a process for timely nuclear licensing at brownfield sites and improve its licensing capacity for advanced nuclear fuel, hiring staff as necessary
- a requirement for the NRC to "coordinate certain international nuclear activities"
- authorization for certain foreign entities to receive licenses under the Atomic Energy Act of 1954
- authorization for the EPA to assist in remediating certain hazardous abandoned mines on tribal lands

The act changes the mission statement of the NRC to "not unnecessarily limit" nuclear power, a change that has drawn criticism.

=== Licensing ===
The ADVANCE Act is intended to cut licensing costs for advanced nuclear reactor technologies, accelerate licensing at certain sites, and create a prize for deployment of next-generation nuclear reactors.

The act aims to simplify permitting overall, reducing fees and delays. The act requires the NRC to report ways to streamline and quicken environmental reviews for reactors.

The act is intended to accelerate licensing at certain sites, including for additional reactors at existing nuclear power plants and for SMR licensing at former fossil fuel power sites and other brownfield sites, which would include TerraPower's Natrium demonstration plant at PacifiCorp's Naughton coal-fired power station.

For next-generation nuclear reactors, the act directs the NRC to lower licensing fees for advanced reactors and improve its capacity to license advanced and accident-tolerant nuclear fuels, with funding granted to hire necessary staff.

The act establishes a prize, equal to NRC licensing fees, to be given upon the first advanced reactor permit issued to the Tennessee Valley Authority or a non-federal entity.

=== Foreign exports ===
The act allows the NRC to issue licenses to OECD and Indian entities, where the Atomic Energy Act had prohibited the NRC from issuing licenses to foreign entities.

The act also directs the DOE streamline its nuclear export approval process and creates incentives for nuclear technology export. The act authorizes the Department of Commerce and Department of Energy to facilitate public–private financing partnerships for the export of nuclear power technology.
