= ThorCon nuclear reactor =

Proposed nuclear power plant design

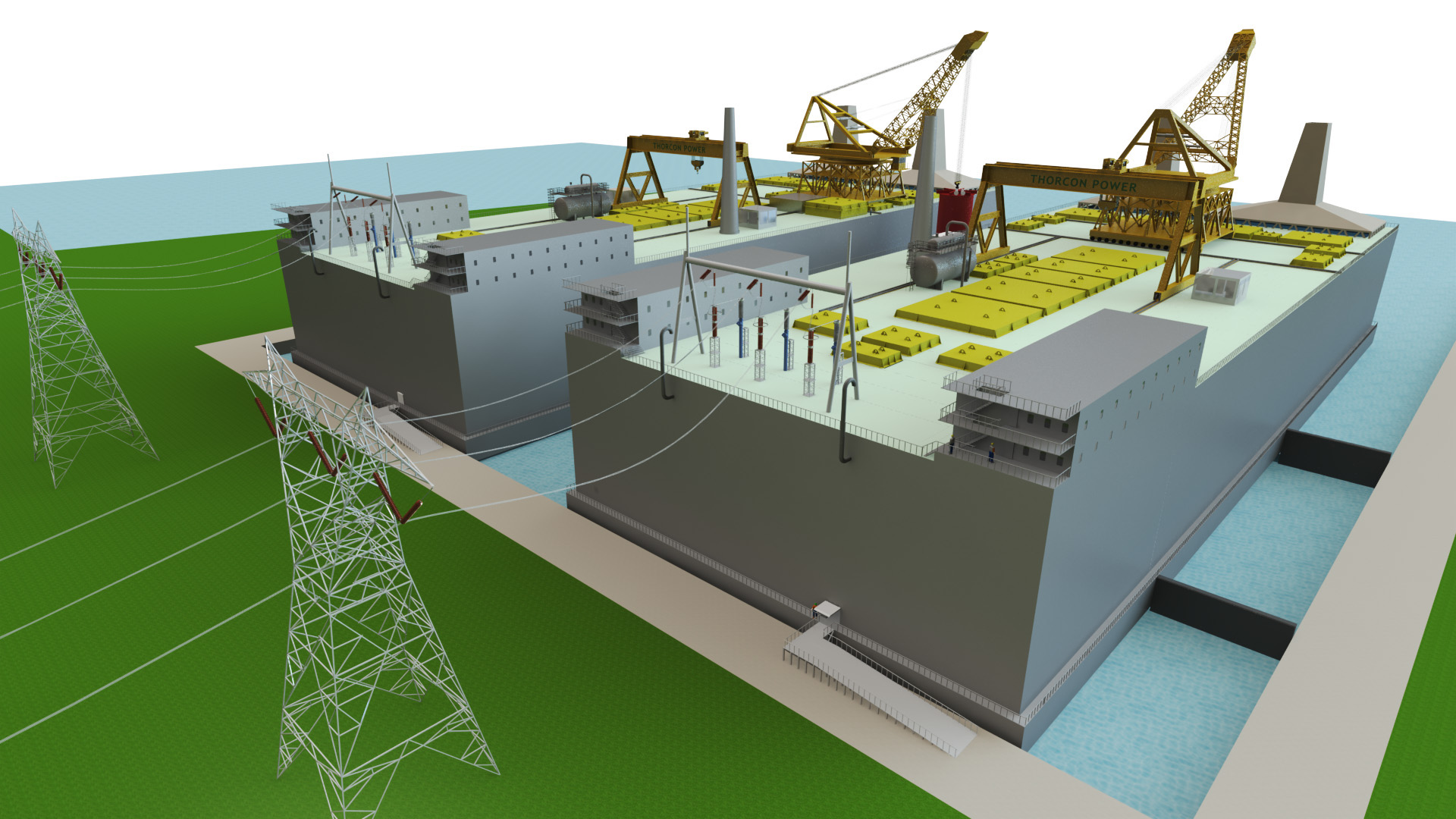
Artists impression of the TMSR-500 conceptual design

The ThorCon nuclear reactor is a design of a molten salt reactor with a graphite moderator, currently proposed by the US-based ThorCon company. These nuclear reactors are designed as part of a floating power plant, to be manufactured on an assembly line in a shipyard, and to be delivered via barge to any ocean or major waterway shoreline, similar to the US's MH-1A from 1968 and the Russian Akademik Lomonosov operating since 2020. The reactors are to be delivered as a sealed unit and never opened on site. All reactor maintenance and fuel processing are to be done at an off-site location. As of April 2025, no reactor of this type has been built.

== Design ==
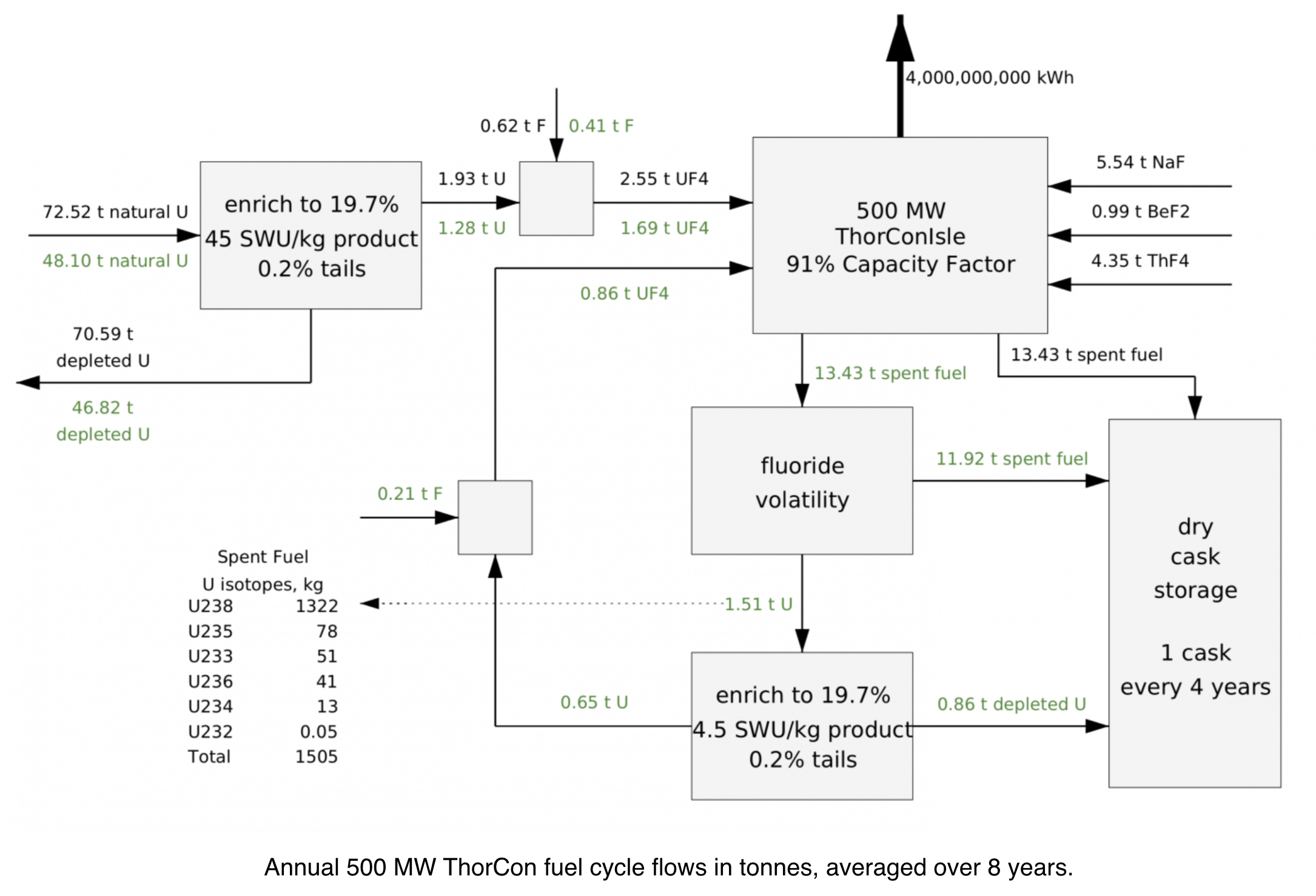
Raw material flows and waste at a ThorCon fuel processing plant. Enriched uranium powers the cycle, but most of the energy comes from the more abundant thorium.

ThorCon has proposed its power station to be closely based on the Molten-Salt Reactor Experiment in the 1960s, claiming that its design requires no new technology. The power station would contain two 250 MWe small modular reactors. The replaceable reactors are to be removed and replaced every four years. As molten salt reactors, they are designed for the use of fuel in liquid form, which also serves as primary coolant. The fuel would be about 20% enriched uranium tetrafluoride and thorium tetrafluoride. The ThorCon design is a floating power station to be built in a shipyard and then towed to the location of operation.

== Company's claim about safety ==
Thorcon claims that this reactor design will be safer than traditional nuclear reactors. The design includes several features intended to prevent meltdowns, contain radioactive materials, and protect from terrorism and sabotage.

== Potential prototype installation in Indonesia ==
P3Tek, an agency of the Indonesia Ministry of Energy and Mineral Resources, reviewed a 500 MW prototype thorium molten salt reactor design by ThorCon called the TMSR-500 in 2019. (The TMSR-500 was later renamed the Thorcon 500.)

In 2023, the company began a pre-licensing consultation with Indonesian regulators toward installing a TMSR-500 there. In 2025, the Indonesian regulatory agency approved a site evaluation plan and site evaluation management system plan for the reactor. A site license and design approval remained yet to be completed, but the company said there was "the potential to start construction in 2027 and achieve full power by 2031".

== See also ==
- Thorium fuel cycle
- Liquid fluoride thorium reactor
- Thorium Energy Alliance
