= MoltexFLEX, Ltd. =

British nuclear energy company (e. 2022)

- Type: Private
- Industry: Nuclear power
- Founded: 2022
- Founder: Dr. Ian Scott (Chairman)
- Headquarters: Warrington, UK
- Key people: David Landon (CEO)
- Website: http://www.moltexflex.com/

MoltexFLEX is a British nuclear energy company developing small modular molten salt reactors. Their reactor designs, termed "FLEX reactors", are stable salt reactors, and feature a hybrid approach whereby fuel assemblies similar to current light water reactors containing the liquid salt fuel mixture are submerged in a pool of liquid salt coolant.

== History ==
MoltexFLEX, Ltd. was launched in 2022 to develop "flexibly-operated" molten salt reactors in the UK. The company is a subsidiary of Moltex Energy Limited, which was created in 2014 to develop stable salt reactor technologies. MoltexFLEX has a laboratory in Warrington, Cheshire.

== The FLEX reactor ==
MoltexFLEX's proposed product, the FLEX reactor, operates in the thermal spectrum and uses low enriched uranium. Stable salt reactors fundamentally differ from other molten salt reactor designs in that the radioactive fuel salt is confined within fuel tube assemblies similar to those found in conventional light-water reactors. A separate, non-radioactive molten salt transfers the heat from the reactor core to heat exchangers.

The stable salt reactor design requires no moving parts. The cooling salt circulates through the core using natural convection, greatly simplifying the design.

The FLEX reactor was originally designed to output 40 MWt, equivalent to 16 MWe, but this was later revised to be upwards of 60 MWt / 24 MWe. Each reactor unit is stated to be roughly the size of a three-bedroom house. MoltexFLEX claims the reactors can be used singly or combined in arrays. Used in combination with the company's GridReserve molten salt thermal storage system, large arrays could be used to provide baseload or peaking power at an estimated cost of £40/MWe. The company states that a 500MWe plant employing 32 FLEX reactors could be constructed in approximately 24 months. MoltexFLEX intends FLEX reactors to complement intermittent generation from renewables such as wind and solar power.

Additionally, the FLEX reactor will generate heat at 750 °C, which is intended to be used in several downstream decarbonisation applications. These include: high-temperature electrolysis to efficiently produce hydrogen for use in industry or fuel cells for heavy transport, desalination, and process heat for industry.

Similar to other small modular designs, components of the FLEX reactor are intended to be factory-produced and readily transportable to reduce on-site work, thereby increasing speed of construction and minimising overall costs. The company claims the physics of the molten salt ensure passive safety, and that FLEX reactors do not require redundant, active safety systems. The FLEX reactor is designed to operate at atmospheric pressures, and therefore the large and expensive concrete and steel containment structures inherent in conventional nuclear plants are deemed unnecessary. Time between refuelling is claimed to be approximately 5 years, with a plant lifetime of 60 years.

== Research and development ==
MoltexFLEX states it intends to use as many already-available components and materials as possible, with the turbine island using technology that is standard within the electricity generation industry. The company aims to have a first-of-its-kind prototype in operation by 2029.

A research initiative with the University of Manchester to examine the behaviour of standard industrial-grade graphite for neutron moderation was announced in early 2023. The company was awarded a £1.2 million grant from the UK Nuclear Fuel Fund in July 2023 to build and operate rigs for the development of molten salt fuel. The company also signed a Memorandum of Understanding with Emirates Nuclear Energy Corporation in December 2023 to examine the commercial viability of deploying FLEX reactors in the United Arab Emirates.
