= Flexblue =

Flexblue was a concept of a small nuclear power plant (50 to 250 MWe), measuring a hundred meters long and about 14 meters in diameter. The reactor would be placed several tens of metres underwater, several kilometres off the sea coast. The surrounding sea water would provide the heat sink for the reactor, as well as protection from attack.

It was studied by Naval Group (French industrial group specialised in naval defence and marine renewable energy) from 2008 to around 2016, in partnership with AREVA, the CEA and EDF. The production unit, as it was presented by its promoters, could be used by developing countries and in areas of developed countries that need to compensate for an energy deficit. Another target market for the reactor was medium-sized countries, like Monaco, which may be unsuitable for large nuclear plants.

Proponents of the Flexblue technology point out that this type of reactor would be much less prone to terrorist attacks than terrestrial-based ones. However, nuclear reactor leaks would be much more difficult and costly to resolve underwater. Scholars have pointed out that operating a nuclear reactor underwater would also raise the surrounding water temperature by several degrees and affect the surrounding marine biome.

== See also ==
=== Related Pages ===
- List of small nuclear reactor designs
- Naval Group
- Energy policy of the European Union

=== External links ===
- Official site of Flexblue Naval Group
- List of Small Nuclear Reactors
- The encyclopedia of Earth - Small nuclear power reactors
