= U-Battery =

Small nuclear reactor design

- Generation: IV
- Status: Design archived

Main parameters of the reactor core
- Fuel (fissile material): Information missing
- Primary coolant: Helium

Reactor usage
- Power (thermal): 10 MWt
- Power (electric): 4 MWe
- Criticality (date): 2028 (planned)
- Operator/owner: consortium (Urenco, Kinectrics, Jacobs)
- Website: www.u-battery.com

U-battery is a micro–small modular reactor design of a nuclear reactor.

== History ==
The design for U-Battery was created at Delft University of Technology in the Netherlands and Manchester University in the United Kingdom basing it on high temperature reactor (HTR) technology which was already available in Europe. A consortium was formed to develop the product, participants including consortium that includes Urenco, Kinectrics and Jacobs Solutions.

Finance has been supported by grants from the UK government's Advanced Modular Reactor Feasibility and Development project, being selected for phase two in July 2020. Each reactor is targeted to cost £50m.

The design is for a 10 MWt / 4 MWe (Note: MWt refers to thermal megawatt, MWe refers to electrically power produced in megawatts) micro-small modular reactor. The design is graphite-moderated, helium-cooled and based on high temperature reactor (HTR) concepts some of which were pioneered from the Dragon reactor, while the fuel block is based on the earlier Fort St. Vrain reactor. The target fuel is TRISO with 17–20% enriched uranium which might be supplemented by thorium with a beryllium oxide reflector.

A £1.6 million mock up has been set up at Whetstone, Leicestershire. The first site in the UK could be at Capenhurst.

In March 2023, Urenco ended its support, saying "we can no longer continue our support of the U-Battery Advanced Modular Reactor project, having exhausted our attempts to secure the commitment of new commercial investors." Intellectual property in the design will be transferred to the National Nuclear Laboratory. The staff joined Ultra safe nuclear.
