= Isaiah P. Taylor =

American entrepreneur

Isaiah P. Taylor (born 1999) is an American entrepreneur. He is the founder and CEO of Valar Atomics.

Taylor dropped out of high school at age 16 to work as a programmer. He founded Valar Atomics in 2023.

Taylor is a postmillennial Christian. He attends a CREC church.
