= Liquid fluoride thorium reactor =

Type of nuclear reactor that uses molten material as fuel

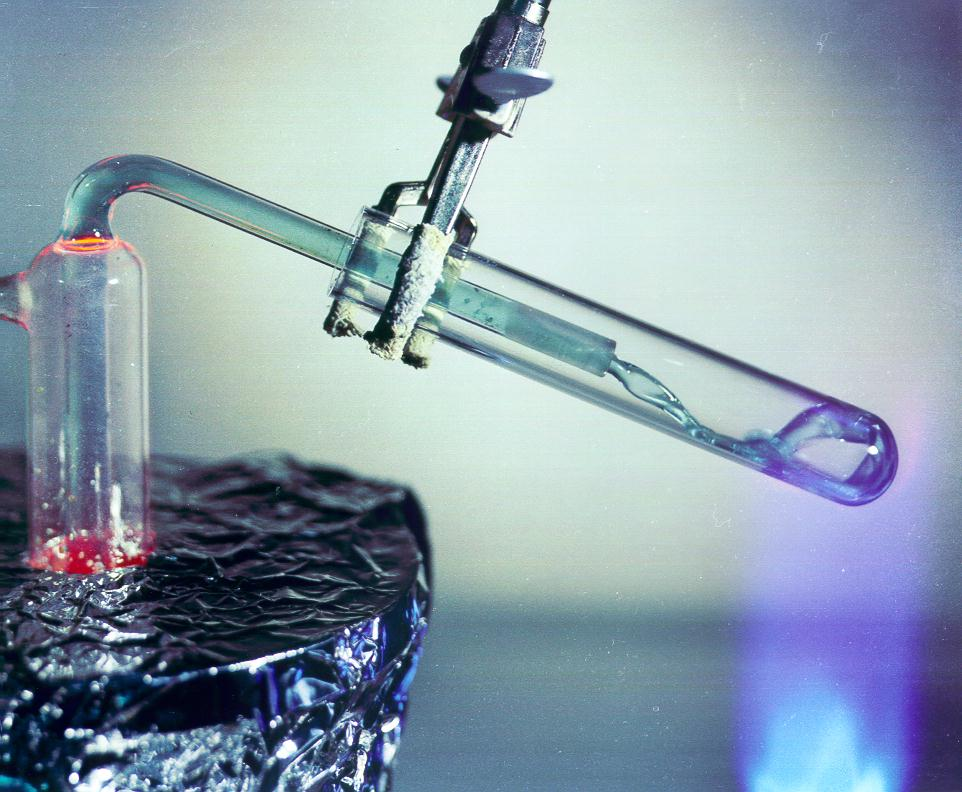
Liquid FLiBe salt

The liquid fluoride thorium reactor (LFTR; often pronounced lifter) is a type of molten salt reactor. LFTRs use the thorium fuel cycle with a fluoride-based molten (liquid) salt for fuel. In a typical design, the liquid is pumped between a critical core and an external heat exchanger where the heat is transferred to a nonradioactive secondary salt. The secondary salt then transfers its heat to a steam turbine or closed-cycle gas turbine.

Molten-salt-fueled reactors (MSRs) supply the nuclear fuel mixed into a molten salt. They should not be confused with designs that use a molten salt for cooling only (fluoride high-temperature reactors) and still have a solid fuel. Molten salt reactors, as a class, include both burners and breeders in fast or thermal spectra, using fluoride or chloride salt-based fuels and a range of fissile or fertile consumables. LFTRs are defined by the use of fluoride fuel salts and the breeding of thorium into uranium-233 in the thermal neutron spectrum.

The LFTR concept was first investigated at the Oak Ridge National Laboratory Molten-Salt Reactor Experiment in the 1960s, though the MSRE did not use thorium. The LFTR has recently been the subject of a renewed interest worldwide. Japan, China, the UK and private US, Czech, Canadian and Australian companies have expressed the intent to develop, and commercialize the technology.

LFTRs differ from other power reactors in almost every aspect: they use thorium that breeds into uranium-233, instead of using isotope-enhanced uranium-235 (enriched uranium); they are refueled by pumping without shutdown. Their liquid salt coolant allows higher operating temperature and much lower pressure in the primary cooling loop. These distinctive characteristics give rise to many potential advantages, as well as design challenges.

== Background ==
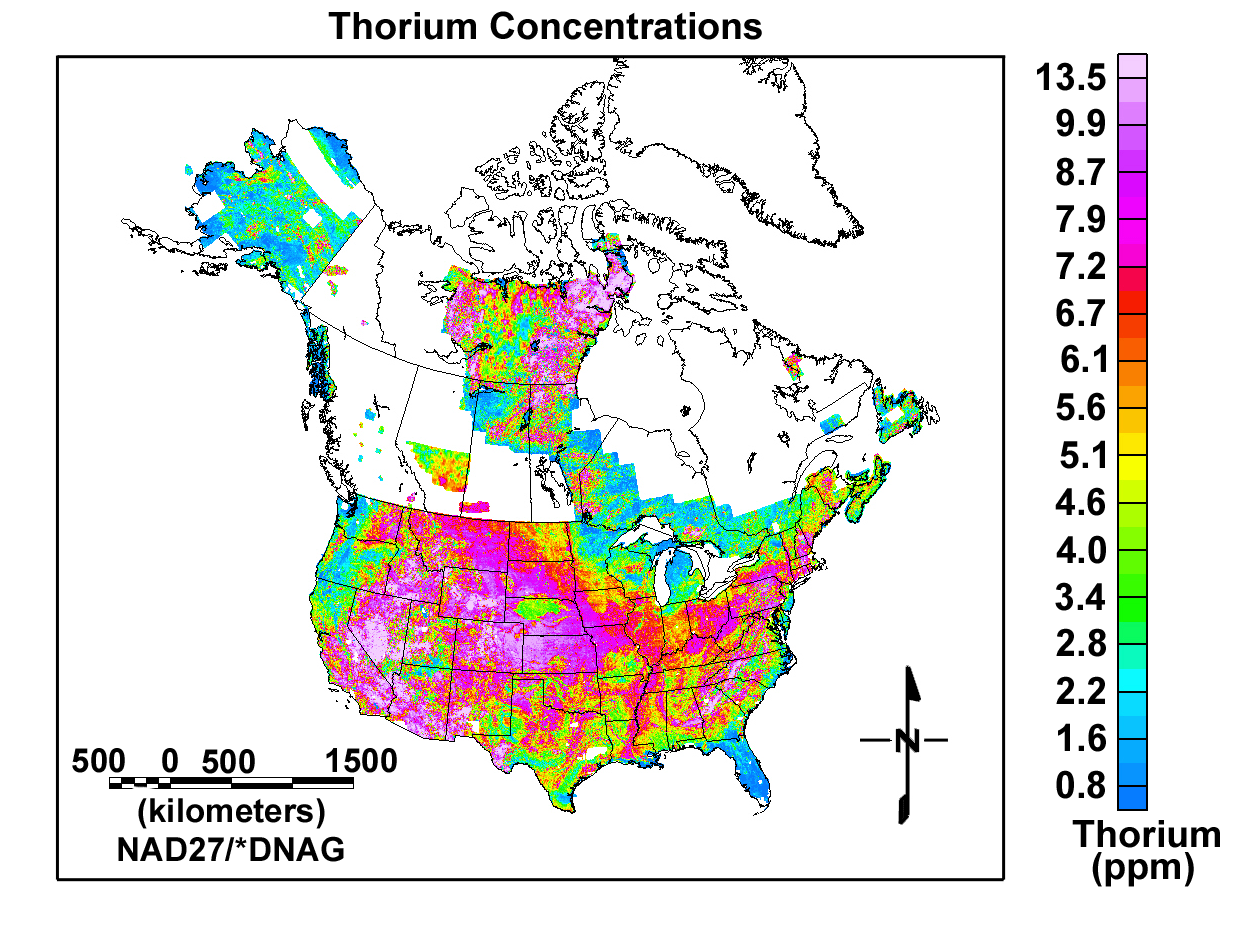
Thorium is relatively abundant in the Earth's crust.

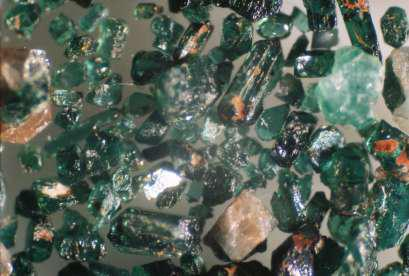
Tiny crystals of thorite, a thorium mineral, under magnification.

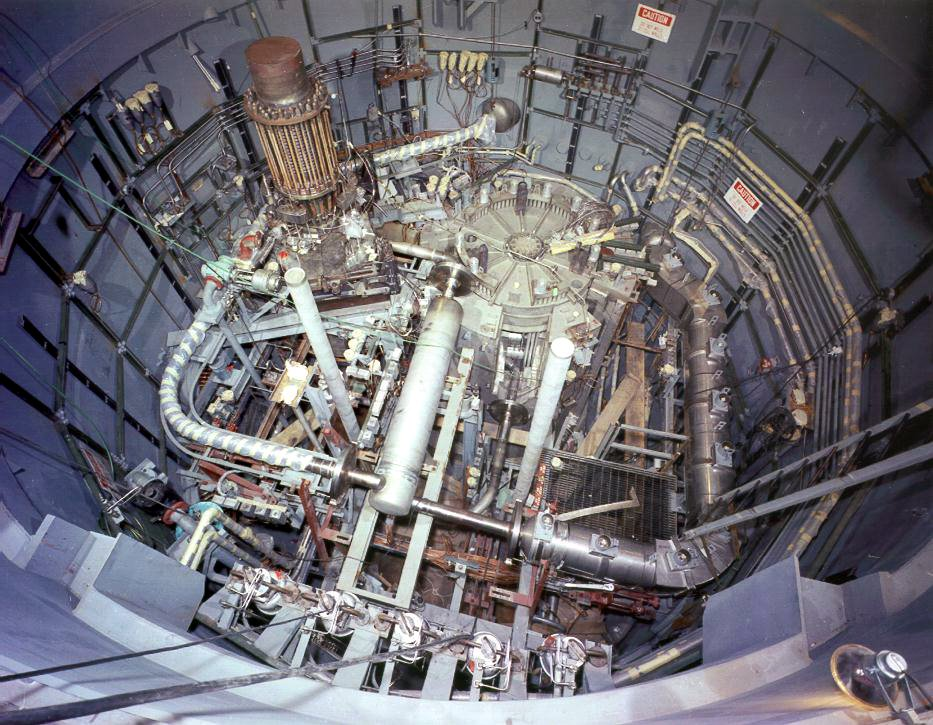
Molten salt reactor at Oak Ridge

By 1946, eight years after the discovery of nuclear fission, three fissile isotopes had been publicly identified for use as nuclear fuel:

- Uranium-235, which is already fissile, and occurs as 0.72% of natural uranium
- Plutonium-239, which can be bred from non-fissile uranium-238 (>99% of natural uranium)
- Uranium-233, which can be bred from non-fissile thorium-232 (~100% of natural thorium; which has about four times greater abundance in the Earth's crust than uranium)

Th-232, U-235 and U-238 are primordial nuclides, having existed in their current form for over 4.5 billion years, predating the formation of the Earth; they were forged in the cores of dying stars through the r-process and scattered across the galaxy by supernovas. Their radioactive decay produces about half of the Earth's internal heat.

For technical and historical reasons, the three are each associated with different reactor types. U-235 is the world's primary nuclear fuel and is usually used in light water reactors. U-238/Pu-239 has found the most use in liquid sodium fast breeder reactors and CANDU reactors. Th-232/U-233 is best suited to molten salt reactors (MSR).

Alvin M. Weinberg pioneered the use of the MSR at Oak Ridge National Laboratory. At ORNL, two prototype molten salt reactors were successfully designed, constructed and operated. These were the Aircraft Reactor Experiment (ARE) in 1954 and Molten-Salt Reactor Experiment (MSRE) from 1965 to 1969. Both test reactors used liquid fluoride fuel salts. The MSRE notably demonstrated fueling with U-233 and U-235 during separate test runs. Weinberg was removed from his post and the MSR program closed down in the early 1970s, after which research stagnated in the United States. Today, the ARE and the MSRE remain the only molten salt reactors ever operated.

== Breeding basics ==
In a nuclear power reactor, there are two types of fuel. The first is fissile material, which splits when hit by neutrons, releasing a large amount of energy and also releasing two or three new neutrons. These can split more fissile material, resulting in a continued chain reaction. Examples of fissile fuels are U-233, U-235 and Pu-239. The second type of fuel is called fertile. Examples of fertile fuel are Th-232 (mined thorium) and U-238 (mined uranium). In order to become fissile these nuclides must first absorb a neutron that's been produced in the process of fission, to become Th-233 and U-239 respectively. After two sequential beta decays, they transmute into fissile isotopes U-233 and Pu-239 respectively. This process is called breeding.

All reactors breed some fuel this way, but today's solid-fueled thermal reactors do not breed enough new fuel from the fertile to make up for the amount of fissile they consume. This is because today's reactors use the mined uranium-plutonium cycle in a moderated neutron spectrum. Such a fuel cycle, using slowed-down neutrons, gives back less than two new neutrons from fissioning the bred plutonium. Since one neutron is required to sustain the fission reaction, this leaves a budget of less than one neutron per fission to breed new fuel. In addition, the materials in the core such as metals, moderators and fission products absorb some neutrons, leaving too few neutrons to breed enough fuel to continue operating the reactor. As a consequence they must add new fissile fuel periodically and swap out some of the old fuel to make room for the new fuel.

In a reactor that breeds at least as much new fuel as it consumes, it is not necessary to add new fissile fuel. Only new fertile fuel is added, which breeds to fissile inside the reactor. In addition the fission products need to be removed. This type of reactor is called a breeder reactor. If it breeds just as much new fissile from fertile to keep operating indefinitely, it is called a break-even breeder or isobreeder. A LFTR is usually designed as a breeder reactor: thorium goes in, fissile products come out.

Reactors that use the uranium-plutonium fuel cycle require fast reactors to sustain breeding, because only with fast moving neutrons does the fission process provide more than 2 neutrons per fission. With thorium, it is possible to breed using a thermal reactor. This was proven to work in the Shippingport Atomic Power Station, whose final fuel load bred slightly more fissile from thorium than it consumed, despite being a fairly standard light water reactor. Thermal reactors require less of the expensive fissile fuel to start, but are more sensitive to fission products left in the core.

There are two ways to configure a breeder reactor to do the required breeding. One can place the fertile and fissile fuel together, so breeding and splitting occurs in the same place. Alternatively, fissile and fertile can be separated. The latter is known as core-and-blanket, because a fissile core produces the heat and neutrons while a separate blanket does all the breeding.

== Reactor primary system design variations ==
Oak Ridge investigated both ways to make a breeder for their molten salt breeder reactor. Because the fuel is liquid, they are called the "single fluid" and "two fluid" thorium thermal breeder molten salt reactors.

=== Single fluid reactor ===
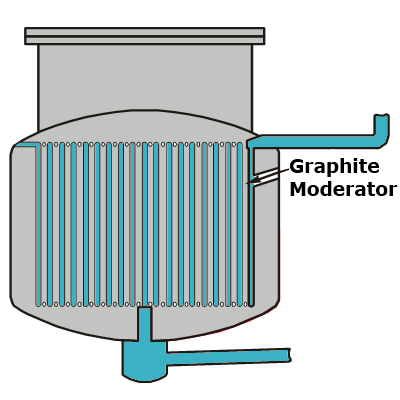
Simplified schematic of a single fluid reactor.

The one-fluid design includes a large reactor vessel filled with fluoride salt containing thorium and uranium. Graphite rods immersed in the salt function as a moderator and to guide the flow of salt. In the ORNL MSBR (molten salt breeder reactor) design a reduced amount of graphite near the edge of the reactor core would make the outer region under-moderated, and increased the capture of neutrons there by the thorium. With this arrangement, most of the neutrons were generated at some distance from the reactor boundary, and reduced the neutron leakage to an acceptable level. Still, a single fluid design needs a considerable size to permit breeding.

In a breeder configuration, extensive fuel processing was specified to remove fission products from the fuel salt. In a converter configuration fuel processing requirement was simplified to reduce plant cost. The trade-off was the requirement of periodic uranium refueling.

The MSRE was a core region only prototype reactor. The MSRE provided valuable long-term operating experience. According to estimates of Japanese scientists, a single fluid LFTR program could be achieved through a relatively modest investment of roughly 300–400 million dollars over 5–10 years to fund research to fill minor technical gaps and build a small reactor prototype comparable to the MSRE.

=== Two fluid reactor ===
The two-fluid design is mechanically more complicated than the "single fluid" reactor design. The "two fluid" reactor has a high-neutron-density core that burns uranium-233 from the thorium fuel cycle. A separate blanket of thorium salt absorbs neutrons and slowly converts its thorium to protactinium-233. Protactinium-233 can be left in the blanket region where neutron flux is lower, so that it slowly decays to U-233 fissile fuel, rather than capture neutrons. This bred fissile U-233 can be recovered by injecting additional fluorine to create uranium hexafluoride, a gas which can be captured as it comes out of solution. Once reduced again to uranium tetrafluoride, a solid, it can be mixed into the core salt medium to fission. The core's salt is also purified, first by fluorination to remove uranium, then vacuum distillation to remove and reuse the carrier salts. The still bottoms left after the distillation are the fission products waste of a LFTR.

The advantages of separating the core and blanket fluid include:

1. Simpler fuel processing. Thorium is chemically similar to several fission products, called lanthanides. With thorium in a separate blanket, thorium is kept isolated from the lanthanides. Without thorium in the core fluid, removal of lanthanide fission products is simplified.
2. Low fissile inventory. Because the fissile fuel is concentrated in a small core fluid, the actual reactor core is more compact. There is no fissile material in the outer blanket that contains the fertile fuel for breeding, other than that which has been bred there. Because of this, the 1968 ORNL design required just 315 kilograms of fissile materials to start up a 250 MW(e) two fluid MSBR reactor. This reduces the cost of the initial fissile startup charge, and allows more reactors to be started up on any given amount of fissile material.
3. More efficient breeding. The thorium blanket can effectively capture leaked neutrons from the core region. There is nearly zero fission occurring in the blanket, so the blanket itself does not leak significant numbers of neutrons. This results in a high efficiency of neutron use (neutron economy), and a higher breeding ratio, especially with small reactors.

One weakness of the two-fluid design is the necessity of periodically replacing the core-blanket barrier due to fast neutron damage. ORNL chose graphite for its barrier material because of its low neutron absorption, compatibility with the molten salts, high temperature resistance, and sufficient strength and integrity to separate the fuel and blanket salts. The effect of neutron radiation on graphite is to slowly shrink and then swell it, causing an increase in porosity and a deterioration in physical properties. Graphite pipes would change length, and may crack and leak.

Another weakness of the two-fluid design is its complex plumbing. ORNL thought a complex interleaving of core and blanket tubes was necessary to achieve a high power level with acceptably low power density. ORNL chose not to pursue the two-fluid design, and no examples of the two-fluid reactor were ever constructed.

However, more recent research has questioned the need for ORNL's complex interleaving graphite tubing, suggesting a simple elongated tube-in-shell reactor that would allow high power output without complex tubing, accommodate thermal expansion, and permit tube replacement. Additionally, graphite can be replaced with high molybdenum alloys, which are used in fusion experiments and have greater tolerance to neutron damage.

=== Hybrid "one and a half fluid" reactor ===
A two fluid reactor that has thorium in the fuel salt is sometimes called a "one and a half fluid" reactor, or 1.5 fluid reactor. This is a hybrid, with some of the advantages and disadvantages of both 1 fluid and 2 fluid reactors. Like the 1 fluid reactor, it has thorium in the fuel salt, which complicates the fuel processing. And yet, like the 2 fluid reactor, it can use a highly effective separate blanket to absorb neutrons that leak from the core. The added disadvantage of keeping the fluids separate using a barrier remains, but with thorium present in the fuel salt there are fewer neutrons that must pass through this barrier into the blanket fluid. This results in less damage to the barrier. Any leak in the barrier would also be of lower consequence, as the processing system must already deal with thorium in the core.

The main design question when deciding between a one and a half or two fluid LFTR is whether a more complicated reprocessing or a more demanding structural barrier will be easier to solve.

Calculated nuclear performance of 1000-MW(e) MSBR design concepts
Design concept	Breeding ratio	Fissile inventory
Single-fluid, 30-year graphite life, fuel processing	1.06	2300 kg
Single-fluid, 4-year graphite life, fuel processing	1.06	1500 kg
1.5 fluid, replaceable core, fuel processing	1.07	900 kg
Two-fluid, replaceable core, fuel processing	1.07	700 kg

== Power generation ==
An LFTR with a high operating temperature of 700 degrees Celsius can operate at a thermal efficiency in converting heat to electricity of 45%. This is higher than today's light water reactors (LWRs) that are at 32–36% thermal to electrical efficiency. In addition to electricity generation, concentrated thermal energy from the high-temperature LFTR can be used as high-grade industrial process heat for many uses, such as ammonia production with the Haber process or thermal hydrogen production by water splitting, eliminating the efficiency loss of first converting to electricity.

=== Rankine cycle ===
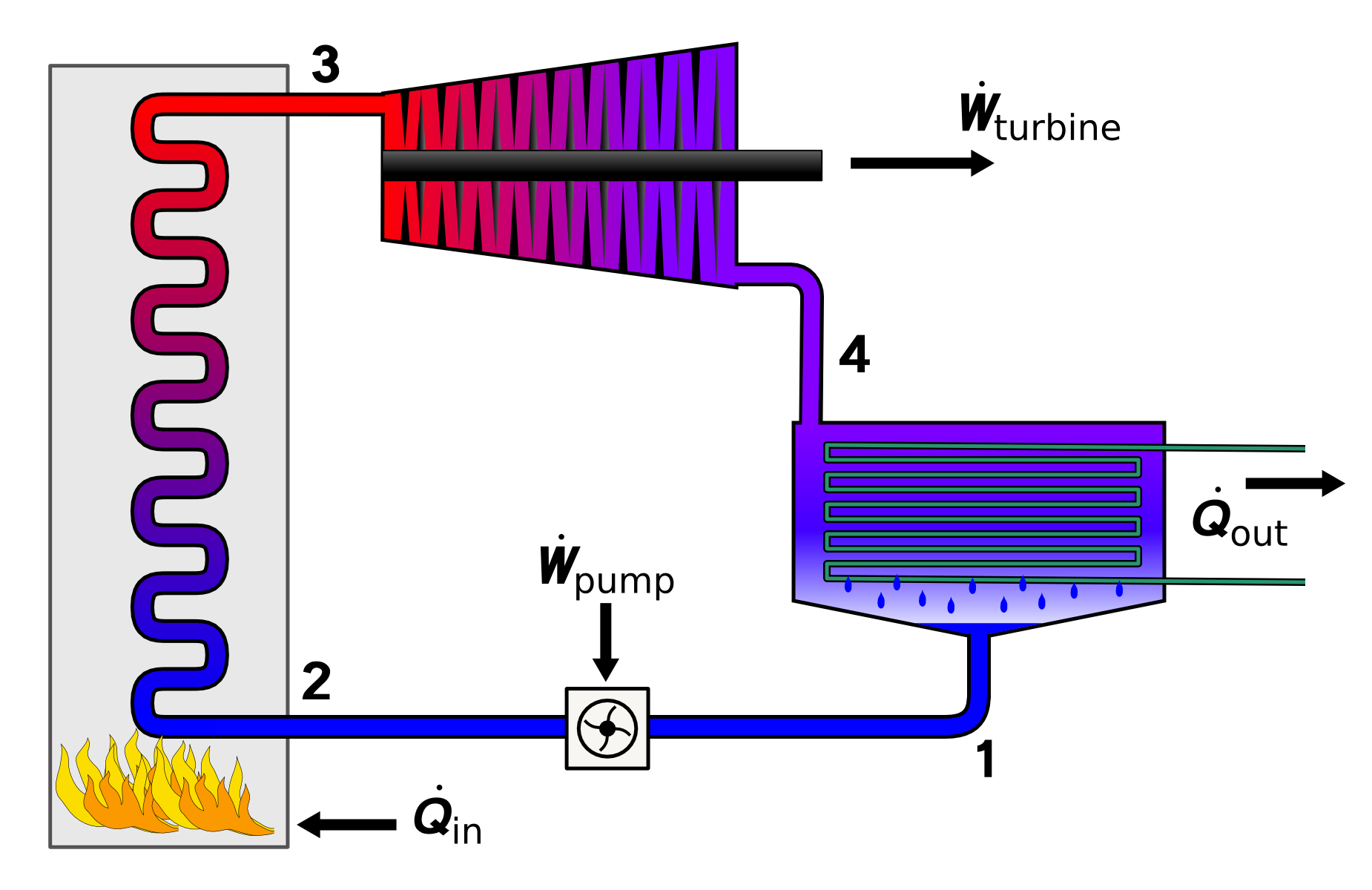
Rankine steam cycle

The Rankine cycle is the most basic thermodynamic power cycle. The simplest cycle consists of a steam generator, a turbine, a condenser, and a pump. The working fluid is usually water. A Rankine power conversion system coupled to a LFTR could take advantage of increased steam temperature to improve its thermal efficiency. The subcritical Rankine steam cycle is currently used in commercial power plants, with the newest plants utilizing the higher temperature, higher pressure, supercritical Rankine steam cycles. The work of ORNL from the 1960s and 1970s on the MSBR assumed the use of a standard supercritical steam turbine with an efficiency of 44%, and had done considerable design work on developing molten fluoride salt – steam generators.

=== Brayton cycle ===
Closed-cycle gas turbine schematic

The Brayton cycle generator has a much smaller footprint than the Rankine cycle, lower cost and higher thermal efficiency, but requires higher operating temperatures. It is therefore particularly suitable for use with a LFTR. The working gas can be helium, nitrogen, or carbon dioxide. The low-pressure warm gas is cooled in an ambient cooler. The low-pressure cold gas is compressed to the high-pressure of the system. The high-pressure working gas is expanded in a turbine to produce power. Often the turbine and the compressor are mechanically connected through a single shaft. High pressure Brayton cycles are expected to have a smaller generator footprint compared to lower pressure Rankine cycles. A Brayton cycle heat engine can operate at lower pressure with wider diameter piping. The world's first commercial Brayton cycle solar power module (100 kW) was built and demonstrated in Israel's Arava Desert in 2009.

== Removal of fission products ==
The LFTR needs a mechanism to remove the fission products from the fuel. Fission products left in the reactor absorb neutrons and thus reduce neutron economy. This is especially important in the thorium fuel cycle with few spare neutrons and a thermal neutron spectrum, where absorption is strong. The minimum requirement is to recover the valuable fissile material from used fuel.

Removal of fission products is similar to reprocessing of solid fuel elements; by chemical or physical means, the valuable fissile fuel is separated from the waste fission products. Ideally the fertile fuel (thorium or U-238) and other fuel components (e.g. carrier salt or fuel cladding in solid fuels) can also be reused for new fuel. However, for economic reasons they may also end up in the waste.

On site processing is planned to work continuously, cleaning a small fraction of the salt every day and sending it back to the reactor. There is no need to make the fuel salt very clean; the purpose is to keep the concentration of fission products and other impurities (e.g. oxygen) low enough. The concentrations of some of the rare earth elements must be especially kept low, as they have a large absorption cross section. Some other elements with a small cross section like Cs or Zr may accumulate over years of operation before they are removed.

As the fuel of a LFTR is a molten salt mixture, it is attractive to use pyroprocessing, high temperature methods working directly with the hot molten salt. Pyroprocessing does not use radiation sensitive solvents and is not easily disturbed by decay heat. It can be used on highly radioactive fuel directly from the reactor. Having the chemical separation on site, close to the reactor avoids transport and keeps the total inventory of the fuel cycle low. Ideally everything except new fuel (thorium) and waste (fission products) stays inside the plant.

One potential advantage of a liquid fuel is that it not only facilitates separating fission-products from the fuel, but also isolating individual fission products from one another, which is lucrative for isotopes that are scarce and in high-demand for various industrial (radiation sources for testing welds via radiography), agricultural (sterilizing produce via irradiation), and medical uses (molybdenum-99 which decays into technetium-99m, which is the most commonly used medical radioisotope).

=== Details by element group ===
The more noble metals (Pd, Ru, Ag, Mo, Nb, Sb, Tc) do not form fluorides in the normal salt, but instead fine colloidal metallic particles. They can plate out on metal surfaces like the heat exchanger, or preferably on high surface area filters which are easier to replace. Still, there is some uncertainty where they end up, as the MSRE only provided a relatively short operating experience and independent laboratory experiments are difficult.

Gases like Xe and Kr come out easily with a sparge of helium. In addition, some of the "noble" metals are removed as an aerosol. The quick removal of Xe-135 is particularly important, as it is a very strong neutron poison and makes reactor control more difficult if unremoved; this also improves neutron economy. The gas (mainly He, Xe and Kr) is held for about 2 days until almost all Xe-135 and other short lived isotopes have decayed. Most of the gas can then be recycled. After an additional hold up of several months, radioactivity is low enough to separate the gas at low temperatures into helium (for reuse), xenon (for sale) and krypton, which needs storage (e.g. in compressed form) for an extended time (several decades) to wait for the decay of Kr-85.

For cleaning the salt mixture several methods of chemical separation were proposed. Compared to classical PUREX reprocessing, pyroprocessing can be more compact and produce less secondary waste. The pyroprocesses of the LFTR salt already starts with a suitable liquid form, so it may be less expensive than using solid oxide fuels. However, because no complete molten salt reprocessing plant has been built, all testing has been limited to the laboratory, and with only a few elements. There is still more research and development needed to improve separation and make reprocessing more economically viable.

Uranium and some other elements can be removed from the salt by a process called fluorine volatility: A sparge of fluorine removes volatile high-valence fluorides as a gas. This is mainly uranium hexafluoride, containing the uranium-233 fuel, but also neptunium hexafluoride, technetium hexafluoride and selenium hexafluoride, as well as fluorides of some other fission products (e.g. iodine, molybdenum and tellurium). The volatile fluorides can be further separated by adsorption and distillation. Handling uranium hexafluoride is well established in enrichment. The higher valence fluorides are quite corrosive at high temperatures and require more resistant materials than Hastelloy. One suggestion in the MSBR program at ORNL was using solidified salt as a protective layer. At the MSRE reactor fluorine volatility was used to remove uranium from the fuel salt. Also for use with solid fuel elements fluorine volatility is quite well developed and tested.

Another simple method, tested during the MSRE program, is high temperature vacuum distillation. The lower boiling point fluorides like uranium tetrafluoride and the LiF and BeF carrier salt can be removed by distillation. Under vacuum the temperature can be lower than the ambient pressure boiling point. So a temperature of about 1000 °C is sufficient to recover most of the FLiBe carrier salt. However, while possible in principle, separation of thorium fluoride from the even higher boiling point lanthanide fluorides would require very high temperatures and new materials. The chemical separation for the 2-fluid designs, using uranium as a fissile fuel can work with these two relatively simple processes: Uranium from the blanket salt can be removed by fluorine volatility, and transferred to the core salt. To remove the fissile products from the core salt, first the uranium is removed via fluorine volatility. Then the carrier salt can be recovered by high temperature distillation. The fluorides with a high boiling point, including the lanthanides stay behind as waste.

==== Optional protactinium-233 separations ====
The early Oak Ridge's chemistry designs were not concerned with proliferation and aimed for fast breeding. They planned to separate and store protactinium-233, so it could decay to uranium-233 without being destroyed by neutron capture in the reactor. With a half-life of 27 days, 2 months of storage would assure that 75% of the ^{233}Pa decays to ^{233}U fuel. The protactinium removal step is not required per se for a LFTR. Alternate solutions are operating at a lower power density and thus a larger fissile inventory (for 1 or 1.5 fluid) or a larger blanket (for 2 fluid). Also a harder neutron spectrum helps to achieve acceptable breeding without protactinium isolation.

If Pa separation is specified, this must be done quite often (for example, every 10 days) to be effective. For a 1 GW, 1-fluid plant this means about 10% of the fuel or about 15 t of fuel salt need to go through reprocessing every day. This is only feasible if the costs are much lower than current costs for reprocessing solid fuel.

Newer designs usually avoid the Pa removal and send less salt to reprocessing, which reduces the required size and costs for the chemical separation. It also avoids proliferation concerns due to high purity U-233 that might be available from the decay of the chemical separated Pa.

Separation is more difficult if the fission products are mixed with thorium, because thorium, plutonium and the lanthanides (rare earth elements) are chemically similar. One process suggested for both separation of protactinium and the removal of the lanthanides is the contact with molten bismuth. In a redox-reaction some metals can be transferred to the bismuth melt in exchange for lithium added to the bismuth melt. At low lithium concentrations U, Pu and Pa move to the bismuth melt. At more reducing conditions (more lithium in the bismuth melt) the lanthanides and thorium transfer to the bismuth melt too. The fission products are then removed from the bismuth alloy in a separate step, e.g. by contact to a LiCl melt. However this method is far less developed. A similar method may also be possible with other liquid metals like aluminum.

== Advantages ==
Thorium-fueled molten salt reactors offer many potential advantages compared to conventional solid uranium fueled light water reactors:

=== Safety ===
- Inherent safety. LFTR designs use a strong negative temperature coefficient of reactivity to achieve passive inherent safety against excursions of reactivity. The temperature dependence comes from 3 sources. The first is that thorium absorbs more neutrons if it overheats, the so-called Doppler effect. This leaves fewer neutrons to continue the chain reaction, reducing power. The second part is heating the graphite moderator, that usually causes a positive contribution to the temperature coefficient. The third effect has to do with thermal expansion of the fuel. If the fuel overheats, it expands considerably, which, due to the liquid nature of the fuel, will push fuel out of the active core region. In a small (e.g. the MSRE test reactor) or well moderated core this reduces the reactivity. However, in a large, under-moderated core (e.g. the ORNL MSBR design), less fuel salt means better moderation and thus more reactivity and an undesirable positive temperature coefficient.
- Stable coolant. Molten fluorides are chemically stable and impervious to radiation. The salts do not burn, explode, or decompose, even under high temperature and radiation. There are no rapid violent reactions with water and air that sodium coolant has. There is no combustible hydrogen production that water coolants have. However the salt is not stable to radiation at low (less than 100 C) temperatures due to radiolysis.
- Low pressure operation. Because the coolant salts remain liquid at high temperatures, LFTR cores are designed to operate at low pressures, like 0.6 MPa (comparable to the pressure in the drinking water system) from the pump and hydrostatic pressure. Even if the core fails, there is little increase in volume. Thus the containment building cannot blow up. LFTR coolant salts are chosen to have very high boiling points. Even a several hundred degree heatup during a transient or accident does not cause a meaningful pressure increase. There is no water or hydrogen in the reactor that can cause a large pressure rise or explosion as happened during the Fukushima Daiichi nuclear accident.
- No pressure buildup from fission. LFTRs are not subject to pressure buildup of gaseous and volatile fission products. The liquid fuel allows for online removal of gaseous fission products, such as xenon, for processing, thus these decay products would not be spread in a disaster. Further, fission products are chemically bonded to the fluoride-salt, including iodine, cesium, and strontium, capturing the radiation and preventing the spread of radioactive material to the environment.
- Easier to control. A molten fuel reactor has the advantage of easy removal of xenon-135. Xenon-135, an important neutron absorber, makes solid fueled reactors difficult to control. In a molten fueled reactor, xenon-135 can be removed. In solid-fuel reactors, xenon-135 remains in the fuel and interferes with reactor control.
- Slow heatup. Coolant and fuel are inseparable, so any leak or movement of fuel will be intrinsically accompanied by a large amount of coolant. Molten fluorides have high volumetric heat capacity, some such as FLiBe, even higher than water. This allows them to absorb large amounts of heat during transients or accidents.
- Passive decay heat cooling. Many reactor designs (such as that of the Molten-Salt Reactor Experiment) allow the fuel/coolant mixture to escape to a drain tank, when the reactor is not running (see "Fail safe core" below). This tank is planned to have some kind (details are still open) of passive decay heat removal, thus relying on physical properties (rather than controls) to operate.
- Fail safe core. LFTRs can include a freeze plug at the bottom that has to be actively cooled, usually by a small electric fan. If the cooling fails, say because of a power failure, the fan stops, the plug melts, and the fuel drains to a subcritical passively cooled storage facility. This not only stops the reactor, also the storage tank can more easily shed the decay heat from the short-lived radioactive decay of irradiated nuclear fuels. Even in the event of a major leak from the core such as a pipe breaking, the salt will spill onto the kitchen-sink-shaped room the reactor is in, which will drain the fuel salt by gravity into the passively cooled dump tank.
- Less long-lived waste. LFTRs can dramatically reduce the long-term radiotoxicity of their reactor wastes. Light water reactors with uranium fuel have fuel that is more than 95% U-238. These reactors normally transmute part of the U-238 to Pu-239, a long-lived isotope. Almost all of the fuel is therefore only one step away from becoming a transuranic long-lived element. Plutonium-239 has a half-life of 24,000 years, and is the most common transuranic in spent nuclear fuel from light water reactors. Transuranics like Pu-239 cause the perception that reactor wastes are an eternal problem. In contrast, the LFTR uses the thorium fuel cycle, which transmutes thorium to U-233. Because thorium is a lighter element, more neutron captures are required to produce the transuranic elements. U-233 has two chances to fission in a LFTR. First as U-233 (90% will fission) and then the remaining 10% has another chance as it transmutes to U-235 (80% will fission). The fraction of fuel reaching neptunium-237, the most likely transuranic element, is therefore only 2%, about 15 kg per GWe-year. This is a transuranic production 20x smaller than light water reactors, which produce 300 kg of transuranics per GWe-year. Importantly, because of this much smaller transuranic production, it is much easier to recycle the transuranics. That is, they are sent back to the core to eventually fission. Reactors operating on the U238-plutonium fuel cycle produce far more transuranics, making full recycle difficult on both reactor neutronics and the recycling system. In the LFTR, only a fraction of a percent, as reprocessing losses, goes to the final waste. When these two benefits of lower transuranic production, and recycling, are combined, a thorium fuel cycle reduces the production of transuranic wastes by more than a thousand-fold compared to a conventional once-through uranium-fueled light water reactor. The only significant long-lived waste is the uranium fuel itself, but this can be used indefinitely by recycling, always generating electricity.
  If the thorium stage ever has to be shut down, part of the reactors can be shut down and their uranium fuel inventory burned out in the remaining reactors, allowing a burndown of even this final waste to as small a level as society demands. The LFTR does still produce radioactive fission products in its waste, but they do not last very long – the radiotoxicity of these fission products is dominated by cesium-137 and strontium-90. The longer half-life is cesium: 30.17 years. So, after 30.17 years, decay reduces the radioactivity by a half. Ten half-lives will reduce the radioactivity by two raised to a power of ten, a factor of 1,024. Fission products at that point, in about 300 years, are less radioactive than natural uranium. What's more, the liquid state of the fuel material allows separation of the fission products not only from the fuel, but from each other as well, which enables them to be sorted by the length of each fission product's half-life, so that the ones with shorter half-lives can be brought out of storage sooner than those with longer half-lives.
- Proliferation resistance. In 2016, Nobel Laureate physicist Dr Carlo Rubbia, former director general of CERN, claimed a primary reason for the United States cutting thorium reactor research in the 1970s is what makes it so attractive today: thorium is difficult to turn into a nuclear weapon.
  The LFTR resists diversion of its fuel to nuclear weapons in four ways: first, the thorium-232 breeds by converting first to protactinium-233, which then decays to uranium-233. If the protactinium remains in the reactor, small amounts of U-232 are also produced. U-232 has a decay chain product (thallium-208) that emits powerful, dangerous gamma rays. These are not a problem inside a reactor, but in a bomb, they complicate bomb manufacture, harm electronics and reveal the bomb's location. The second proliferation resistant feature comes from the fact that LFTRs produce very little plutonium, around 15 kg per gigawatt-year of electricity (this is the output of a single large reactor over a year). This plutonium is also mostly Pu-238, which makes it unsuitable for fission bomb building, due to the high heat and spontaneous neutrons emitted. The third track, a LFTR does not make much spare fuel. It produces at most 9% more fuel than it burns each year, and it is even easier to design a reactor that makes only 1% more fuel. With this kind of reactor, building bombs quickly will take power plants out of operation, and this is an easy indication of national intentions. And finally, use of thorium can reduce and eventually eliminate the need to enrich uranium. Uranium enrichment is one of the two primary methods by which states have obtained bomb making materials.

=== Economy and efficiency ===
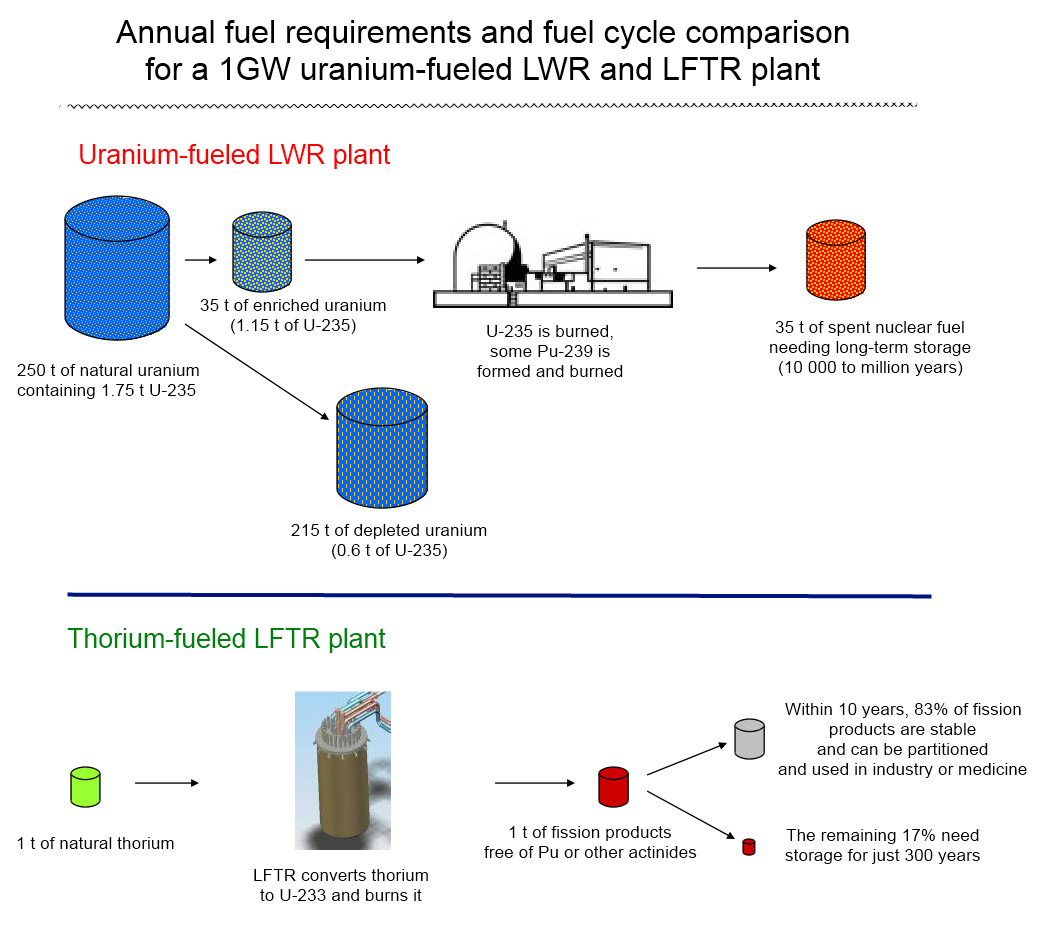
Comparison of annual fuel requirements and waste products of a 1 GW uranium-fueled LWR and 1 GW thorium-fueled LFTR power plant.

- Thorium abundance. A LFTR breeds thorium into uranium-233 fuel. The Earth's crust contains about three to four times as much thorium as U-238 (thorium is about as abundant as lead). It is a byproduct of rare-earth mining, normally discarded as waste. Using LFTRs, there is enough affordable thorium to satisfy the global energy needs for hundreds of thousands of years. Thorium is more common in the earth's crust than tin, mercury, or silver. A cubic meter of average crust yields the equivalent of about four sugar cubes of thorium, enough to supply the energy needs of one person for more than ten years if completely fissioned. Lemhi Pass on the Montana-Idaho border is estimated to contain 1,800,000 tons of high-grade thorium ore. Five hundred tons could supply all U.S. energy needs for one year. Due to lack of current demand, the U.S. government has returned about 3,200 metric tons of refined thorium nitrate to the crust, burying it in the Nevada desert.
- No shortage of natural resources. Sufficient other natural resources such as beryllium, lithium, nickel and molybdenum are available to build thousands of LFTRs.
- Reactor efficiency. Conventional reactors consume less than one percent of the mined uranium, leaving the rest as waste. With perfectly working reprocessing LFTR may consume up to about 99% of its thorium fuel. The improved fuel efficiency means that 1 ton of natural thorium in a LFTR produces as much energy as 35 t of enriched uranium in conventional reactors (requiring 250 t of natural uranium), or 4,166,000 tons of black coal in a coal power plant.
- Thermodynamic efficiency. LFTRs operating with modern supercritical steam turbines would operate at 45% thermal to electrical efficiency. With future closed gas Brayton cycles, which could be used in a LFTR power plant due to its high temperature operation, the efficiency could be up to 54%. This is 20 to 40% higher than today's light water reactors (33%), resulting in the same 20 to 40% reduction in fissile and fertile fuel consumption, fission products produced, waste heat rejection for cooling, and reactor thermal power.
- No enrichment and fuel element fabrication. Since 100% of natural thorium can be used as a fuel, and the fuel is in the form of a molten salt instead of solid fuel rods, expensive fuel enrichment and solid fuel rods' validation procedures and fabricating processes are not needed. This greatly decreases LFTR fuel costs. Even if the LFTR is started up on enriched uranium, it only needs this enrichment once just to get started. After startup, no further enrichment is required.
- Lower fuel cost. The salts are fairly inexpensive compared to solid fuel production. For example, while beryllium is quite expensive per kg, the amount of beryllium required for a large 1 GWe reactor is quite small. ORNL's MSBR required 5.1 tons of beryllium metal, as 26 tons of BeF_{2}. At a price of $147/kg BeF_{2}, this inventory would cost less than $4 million, a modest cost for a multibillion-dollar power plant. Consequently, a beryllium price increase over the level assumed here has little effect in the total cost of the power plant. The cost of enriched lithium-7 is less certain, at $120–800/kg LiF. and an inventory (again based on the MSBR system) of 17.9 tons lithium-7 as 66.5 tons LiF makes between $8 million and $53 million for the LiF. Adding the 99.1 tons of thorium at $30/kg adds only $3 million. Fissile material is more expensive, especially if expensively reprocessed plutonium is used, at a cost of $100 per gram fissile plutonium. With a startup fissile charge of only 1.5 tons, made possible through the soft neutron spectrum this makes $150 million. Adding everything up brings the total cost of the one time fuel charge at $165 to $210 million. This is similar to the cost of a first core for a light water reactor. Depending on the details of reprocessing the salt inventory once can last for decades, whereas the LWR needs a completely new core every 4 to 6 years (1/3 is replaced every 12 to 24 months). ORNL's own estimate for the total salt cost of even the more expensive 3 loop system was around $30 million, which is less than $100 million in today's money.
- LFTRs are cleaner: as a fully recycling system, the discharge wastes from a LFTR are predominantly fission products, most of which (83%) have relatively short half-lives in hours or days compared to longer-lived actinide wastes of conventional nuclear power plants. This results in a significant reduction in the needed waste containment period in a geologic repository. The remaining 17% of waste products require only 300 years until reaching background levels. The radiotoxicity of the thorium fuel cycle waste is about 10,000 times less than that of one through uranium fuel.
- Less fissile fuel needed. Because LFTRs are thermal spectrum reactors, they need much less fissile fuel to get started. Only 1–2 tons of fissile are required to start up a single fluid LFTR, and potentially as low as 0.4 ton for a two fluid design. In comparison, solid fueled fast breeder reactors need at least 8 tons of fissile fuel to start the reactor. While fast reactors can theoretically start up very well on the transuranic waste, their high fissile fuel startup makes this very expensive.
- No downtime for refueling. LFTRs have liquid fuels, and therefore there is no need to shut down and take apart the reactor just to refuel it. LFTRs can thus refuel without causing a power outage (online refueling).
- Load following. As the LFTR does not have xenon poisoning, there is no problem reducing the power in times of low demand for electricity and turn back on at any time.
- No high pressure vessel. Since the core is not pressurized, it does not need the most expensive item in a light water reactor, a high-pressure reactor vessel for the core. Instead, there is a low-pressure vessel and pipes (for molten salt) constructed of relatively thin materials. Although the metal is an exotic nickel alloy that resists heat and corrosion, Hastelloy-N, the amount needed is relatively small.
- Excellent heat transfer. Liquid fluoride salts, especially LiF based salts, have good heat transfer properties. Fuel salt such as LiF-ThF_{4} has a volumetric heat capacity that is around 22% higher than water, FLiBe has around 12% higher heat capacity than water. In addition, the LiF based salts have a thermal conductivity around twice that of the hot pressurized water in a pressurized water reactor. This results in efficient heat transfer and a compact primary loop. Compared to helium, a competing high temperature reactor coolant, the difference is even bigger. The fuel salt has over 200 times higher volumetric heat capacity as hot pressurized helium and over 3 times the thermal conductivity. A molten salt loop will use piping of 1/5 the diameter, and pumps 1/20 the power, of those required for high-pressure helium, while staying at atmospheric pressure
- Smaller, low pressure containment. By using liquid salt as the coolant instead of pressurized water, a containment structure only slightly bigger than the reactor vessel can be used. Light water reactors use pressurized water, which flashes to steam and expands a thousandfold in the case of a leak, necessitating a containment building a thousandfold bigger in volume than the reactor vessel. The LFTR containment can not only be smaller in physical size, its containment is also inherently low pressure. There are no sources of stored energy that could cause a rapid pressure rise (such as Hydrogen or steam) in the containment. This gives the LFTR a substantial theoretical advantage not only in terms of inherent safety, but also in terms of smaller size, lower materials use, and lower construction cost.
- From waste to resource. There are suggestions that it might be possible to extract some of the fission products so that they have separate commercial value. However, compared to the produced energy, the value of the fission products is low, and chemical purification is expensive.
- Efficient mining. The extraction process of thorium from the earth's crust is a much safer and efficient mining method than that of uranium. Thorium's ore, monazite, generally contains higher concentrations of thorium than the percentage of uranium found in its respective ore. This makes thorium a more cost efficient and less environmentally damaging fuel source. Thorium mining is also easier and less dangerous than uranium mining, as the mine is an open pit, which does not require ventilation such as the underground uranium mines, where radon levels are potentially harmful.

== Challenges ==
LFTRs are quite unlike today's operating commercial power reactors. These differences create design difficulties and trade-offs:

- No large scale production yet – A 2014 study from the University of Chicago concluded that since this design hasn't yet reached the commercial phase, full economic advantages won't be realized without the advantages of large scale production: "Although substation cost-savings are associated with the building of a LFTR in comparison to a traditional uranium plant, the difference in cost, given the current industry environment [as of 2014], remains insufficient to justify the creation of a new LFTR".
- Reaching break-even breeding is questionable – While the plans usually call for break-even breeding, it is questionable if this is possible when other requirements are to be met. The thorium fuel cycle has very few spare neutrons. Due to limited chemical reprocessing (for economic reasons) and compromises needed to achieve safety requirements like a negative void coefficient too many neutrons may be lost. Old proposed single fluid designs promising breeding performance tend to have an unsafe positive void coefficient and often assume excessive fuel cleaning to be economic viable.
- Still much development needed – Despite the ARE and MSRE experimental reactors already built in the 1960s, there is still a lot of development needed for the LFTR. This includes most of the chemical separation, (passive) emergency cooling, the tritium barrier, remote operated maintenance, large scale Li-7 production, the high temperature power cycle and more durable materials.
- Startup fuel – Unlike mined uranium, mined thorium does not have a fissile isotope. Thorium reactors breed fissile uranium-233 from thorium, but require a small amount of fissile material for initial start up. There is relatively little of this material available. This raises the problem of how to start the reactors in a short time frame. One option is to produce U-233 in today's solid fueled reactors, then reprocess it out of the solid waste. An LFTR can also be started by other fissile isotopes, enriched uranium or plutonium from reactors or decommissioned bombs. For enriched uranium startup, high enrichment is needed. Decommissioned uranium bombs have enough enrichment, but not enough is available to start many LFTRs. It is difficult to separate plutonium fluoride from lanthanide fission products. One option for a two-fluid reactor is to operate with plutonium or enriched uranium in the fuel salt, breed U-233 in the blanket, and store it instead of returning it to the core. Instead, add plutonium or enriched uranium to continue the chain reaction, similar to today's solid fuel reactors. When enough U-233 is bred, replace the fuel with new fuel, retaining the U-233 for other startups. A similar option exists for a single-fluid reactor operating as a converter. Such a reactor would not reprocess fuel while operating. Instead the reactor would start on plutonium with thorium as the fertile and add plutonium. The plutonium eventually burns out and U-233 is produced in situ. At the end of the reactor fuel life, the spent fuel salt can be reprocessed to recover the bred U-233 to start up new LFTRs.
- Salts freezing – Fluoride salt mixtures have melting points ranging from 300 to 600 °C (572 to 1,112 °F). The salts, especially those with beryllium fluoride, are very viscous near their freezing point. This requires careful design and freeze protection in the containment and heat exchangers. Freezing must be prevented in normal operation, during transients, and during extended downtime. The primary loop salt contains the decay heat-generating fission products, which help to maintain the required temperature. For the MSBR, ORNL planned on keeping the entire reactor room (the hot cell) at high temperature. This avoided the need for individual electric heater lines on all piping and provided more even heating of the primary loop components. One "liquid oven" concept developed for molten salt-cooled, solid-fueled reactors employs a separate buffer salt pool containing the entire primary loop. Because of the high heat capacity and considerable density of the buffer salt, the buffer salt prevents fuel salt freezing and participates in the passive decay heat cooling system, provides radiation shielding and reduces deadweight stresses on primary loop components. This design could also be adopted for LFTRs.
- Beryllium toxicity – The proposed salt mixture FLiBe contains large amounts of beryllium, which is toxic to humans (although nowhere near as toxic as the fission products and other radioactives). The salt in the primary cooling loops must be isolated from workers and the environment to prevent beryllium poisoning. This is routinely done in industry. Based on this industrial experience, the added cost of beryllium safety is expected to cost only $0.12/MWh. After start up, the fission process in the primary fuel salt produces highly radioactive fission products with a high gamma and neutron radiation field. Effective containment is therefore a primary requirement. It is possible to operate instead using lithium fluoride-thorium fluoride eutectic without beryllium, as the French LFTR design, the "TMSR", has chosen. This comes at the cost of a somewhat higher melting point, but has the additional advantages of simplicity (avoiding BeF_{2} in the reprocessing systems), increased solubility for plutonium-trifluoride, reduced tritium production (beryllium produces lithium-6, which in turn produces tritium) and improved heat transfer (BeF_{2} increases the viscosity of the salt mixture). Alternative solvents such as the fluorides of sodium, rubidium and zirconium allow lower melting points at a tradeoff in breeding.
- Loss of delayed neutrons – In order to be predictably controlled, nuclear reactors rely on delayed neutrons. They require additional slowly evolving neutrons from fission product decay to continue the chain reaction. Because the delayed neutrons evolve slowly, this makes the reactor very controllable. In an LFTR, the presence of fission products in the heat exchanger and piping means a portion of these delayed neutrons are also lost. They do not participate in the core's critical chain reaction, which in turn means the reactor behaves less gently during changes of flow, power, etc. Approximately up to half of the delayed neutrons can be lost. In practice, it means that the heat exchanger must be compact so that the volume outside the core is as small as possible. The more compact (higher power density) the core is, the more important this issue becomes. Having more fuel outside the core in the heat exchangers also means more of the expensive fissile fuel is needed to start the reactor. This makes a fairly compact heat exchanger an important design requirement for an LFTR.
- Waste management – About 83% of the radioactive waste has a half-life in hours or days, with the remaining 17% requiring 300-year storage in geologically stable confinement to reach background levels. If the fluoride fuel salts are stored in solid form over many decades, radiation can cause the release of corrosive fluorine gas and uranium hexafluoride. The salts must be defueled and wastes removed before extended shutdowns and stored above 100 degrees Celsius. Fluorides are less suitable for long-term storage because some (e.g. caesium fluoride) have high water solubility unless vitrified in insoluble borosilicate glass.
- Uncertain decommissioning costs – Cleanup of the Molten-Salt Reactor Experiment was about $130 million, for a small 8 MW(th) unit. Much of the high cost was caused by the unexpected evolution of fluorine and uranium hexafluoride from cold fuel salt in storage that ORNL did not defuel and store correctly, but this has now been taken into consideration in MSR design. In addition, decommissioning costs do not scale strongly with plant size based on previous experience, and costs are incurred at the end of plant life, so a small per kilowatthour fee is sufficient. For example, a GWe reactor plant produces over 300 billion kWh of electricity over a 40-year lifetime, so a $0.001/kWh decommissioning fee delivers $300 million plus interest at the end of the plant lifetime.
- Noble metal buildup – Some radioactive fission products, such as noble metals, deposit on pipes. Novel equipment, such as nickel-wool sponge cartridges, must be developed to filter and trap the noble metals to prevent build up.
- Limited graphite lifetime – Compact designs have a limited lifetime for the graphite moderator and fuel / breeding loop separator. Under the influence of fast neutrons, the graphite first shrinks, then expands indefinitely until it becomes very weak and can crack, creating mechanical problems and causing the graphite to absorb enough fission products to poison the reaction. The 1960 two-fluid design had an estimated graphite replacement period of four years. Eliminating graphite from sealed piping was a major incentive to switch to a single-fluid design. Replacing this large central part requires remotely operated equipment. MSR designs have to arrange for this replacement. In a molten salt reactor, virtually all of the fuel and fission products can be piped to a holding tank. Only a fraction of one percent of the fission products end up in the graphite, primarily due to fission products slamming into the graphite. This makes the graphite surface radioactive, and without recycling/removal of at least the surface layer, creates a fairly bulky waste stream. Removing the surface layer and recycling the remainder of the graphite would solve this issue. Several techniques exist to recycle or dispose of nuclear moderator graphite. Graphite is inert and immobile at low temperatures, so it can be readily stored or buried if required. At least one design used graphite balls (pebbles) floating in salt, which could be removed and inspected continuously without shutting down the reactor. Reducing power density increases graphite lifetime. By comparison, solid-fueled reactors typically replace 1/3 of the fuel elements, including all of the highly radioactive fission products therein, every 12 to 24 months. This is routinely done under a protecting and cooling column layer of water.
- Graphite-caused positive reactivity feedback – When graphite heats up, it increases U-233 fission, causing an undesirable positive feedback. The LFTR design must avoid certain combinations of graphite and salt and certain core geometries. If this problem is addressed by employing adequate graphite and thus a well-thermalized spectrum, it is difficult to reach break-even breeding. The alternative of using little or no graphite results in a faster neutron spectrum. This requires a large fissile inventory and radiation damage increases.
- Limited plutonium solubility – Fluorides of plutonium, americium and curium occur as trifluorides, which means they have three fluorine atoms attached (PuF_{3}, AmF_{3}, CmF_{3}). Such trifluorides have a limited solubility in the FLiBe carrier salt. This complicates startup, especially for a compact design that uses a smaller primary salt inventory. Of course, leaving plutonium carrying wastes out of the startup process is an even better solution, making this a non-issue. Solubility can be increased by operating with less or no beryllium fluoride (which has no solubility for trifluorides) or by operating at a higher temperature(as with most other liquids, solubility rises with temperature). A thermal spectrum, lower power density core does not have issues with plutonium solubility.
- Proliferation risk from reprocessing – Effective reprocessing implies a proliferation risk. LFTRs could be used to handle plutonium from other reactors as well. However, as stated above, plutonium is chemically difficult to separate from thorium and plutonium cannot be used in bombs if diluted in large amounts of thorium. In addition, the plutonium produced by the thorium fuel cycle is mostly Pu-238, which produces high levels of spontaneous neutrons and decay heat that make it impossible to construct a fission bomb with this isotope alone, and extremely difficult to construct one containing even very small percentages of it. The heat production rate of 567 W/kg means that a bomb core of this material would continuously produce several kilowatts of heat. The only cooling route is by conduction through the surrounding high explosive layers, which are poor conductors. This creates unmanageably high temperatures that would destroy the assembly. The spontaneous fission rate of 1204 kBq/g is over twice that of Pu-240. Even very small percentages of this isotope would reduce bomb yield drastically by "predetonation" due to neutrons from spontaneous fission starting the chain reaction causing a "fizzle" rather than an explosion. Reprocessing itself involves automated handling in a fully closed and contained hot cell, which complicates diversion. Compared to today's extraction methods such as PUREX, the pyroprocesses are inaccessible and produce impure fissile materials, often with large amounts of fission product contamination. While not a problem for an automated system, it poses severe difficulties for would-be proliferators.
- Proliferation risk from protactinium separation – Compact designs can breed only using rapid separation of protactinium, a proliferation risk, since this potentially gives access to high purity 233-U. This is difficult as the 233-U from these reactors will be contaminated with 232-U, a high gamma radiation emitter, requiring a protective hot enrichment facility as a possible path to weapons-grade material. Because of this, commercial power reactors may have to be designed without separation. In practice, this means either not breeding, or operating at a lower power density. A two-fluid design might operate with a bigger blanket and keep the high power density core (which has no thorium and therefore no protactinium). However, a group of nuclear engineers argues in Nature (2012) that the protactinium pathway is feasible and that thorium is thus "not as benign as has been suggested . . ."
- Proliferation of neptunium-237 – In designs utilizing a fluorinator, Np-237 appears with uranium as gaseous hexafluoride and can be easily separated using solid fluoride pellet absorption beds. No one has produced such a bomb, but Np-237's considerable fast fission cross section and low critical mass imply the possibility. When the Np-237 is kept in the reactor, it transmutes to short lived Pu-238. All reactors produce considerable neptunium, which is always present in high (mono)isotopic quality, and is easily extracted chemically.
- Neutron poisoning and tritium production from lithium-6 – Lithium-6 is a strong neutron poison; using LiF with natural lithium, with its 7.5% lithium-6 content, prevents reactors from starting. The high neutron density in the core rapidly transmutes lithium-6 to tritium, losing neutrons that are required to sustain break-even breeding. Tritium is a radioactive isotope of hydrogen, which is nearly identical, chemically, to ordinary hydrogen. In the MSR the tritium is quite mobile because, in its elemental form, it rapidly diffuses through metals at high temperature. If the lithium is isotopically enriched in lithium-7, and the isotopic separation level is high enough (99.995% lithium-7), the amount of tritium produced is only a few hundred grams per year for a 1 GWe reactor. This much smaller amount of tritium comes mostly from the lithium-7 – tritium reaction and from beryllium, which can produce tritium indirectly by first transmuting to tritium-producing lithium-6. LFTR designs that use a lithium salt, choose the lithium-7 isotope. In the MSRE, lithium-6 was successfully removed from the fuel salt via isotopic enrichment. Since lithium-7 is at least 16% heavier than lithium-6, and is the most common isotope, lithium-6 is comparatively easy and inexpensive to extract. Vacuum distillation of lithium achieves efficiencies of up to 8% per stage and requires only heating in a vacuum chamber. However, about one fission in 90,000 produces helium-6, which quickly decays to lithium-6 and one fission in 12,500 produces an atom of tritium directly (in all reactor types). Practical MSRs operate under a blanket of dry inert gas, usually helium. LFTRs offer a good chance to recover the tritium, since it is not highly diluted in water as in CANDU reactors. Various methods exist to trap tritium, such as hydriding it to titanium, oxidizing it to less mobile (but still volatile) forms such as sodium fluoroborate or molten nitrate salt, or trapping it in the turbine power cycle gas and offgasing it using copper oxide pellets. ORNL developed a secondary loop coolant system that would chemically trap residual tritium so that it could be removed from the secondary coolant rather than diffusing into the turbine power cycle. ORNL calculated that this would reduce Tritium emissions to acceptable levels.
- Corrosion from tellurium – The reactor makes small amounts of tellurium as a fission product. In the MSRE, this caused small amounts of corrosion at the grain boundaries of the special nickel alloy, Hastelloy-N. Metallurgical studies showed that adding 1 to 2% niobium to the Hastelloy-N alloy improves resistance to corrosion by tellurium. Maintaining the ratio of UF_{4}/UF_{3} to less than 60 reduced corrosion by keeping the fuel salt slightly reducing. The MSRE continually contacted the flowing fuel salt with a beryllium metal rod submerged in a cage inside the pump bowl. This caused a fluorine shortage in the salt, reducing tellurium to a less aggressive (elemental) form. This method is also effective in reducing corrosion in general, because the fission process produces more fluorine atoms that would otherwise attack the structural metals.
- Radiation damage to nickel alloys – The standard Hastelloy N alloy was found to be embrittled by neutron radiation. Neutrons reacted with nickel to form helium. This helium gas concentrated at specific points inside the alloy, where it increased stresses. ORNL addressed this problem by adding 1–2% titanium or niobium to the Hastelloy N. This changed the alloy's internal structure so that the helium would be finely distributed. This relieved the stress and allowed the alloy to withstand considerable neutron flux. However the maximum temperature is limited to about 650 °C. Development of other alloys may be required. The outer vessel wall that contains the salt can have neutronic shielding, such as boron carbide, to effectively protect it from neutron damage.
- Business model – Today's solid-fueled reactor vendors make long term revenues by fuel fabrication. Without any fuel to fabricate and sell, an LFTR would adopt a different business model. There would be significant barrier to entry costs to make this a viable business. Existing infrastructure and parts suppliers are geared towards water-cooled reactors. There is little thorium market and thorium mining, so considerable infrastructure that would be required does not yet exist. Regulatory agencies have less experience regulating thorium reactors, creating potentials for extended delays.
- Development of the power cycle – Developing a large helium or supercritical carbon dioxide turbine is needed for highest efficiency. These gas cycles offer numerous potential advantages for use with molten salt-fueled or molten salt-cooled reactors. These closed gas cycles face design challenges and engineering upscaling work for a commercial turbine-generator set. A standard supercritical steam turbine could be used at a small penalty in efficiency (the net efficiency of the MSBR was designed to be approximately 44%, using an old 1970s steam turbine). A molten salt to steam generator would still have to be developed. Currently, molten nitrate salt steam generators are used in concentrated solar thermal power plants such as Andasol in Spain. Such a generator could be used for an MSR as a third circulating loop, where it would also trap any tritium that diffuses through the primary and secondary heat exchanger

== Recent developments ==
=== The Fuji MSR ===
The FUJI MSR was a design for a 100 to 200 MWe molten-salt-fueled thorium fuel cycle thermal breeder reactor, using technology similar to the Oak Ridge National Laboratory Reactor Experiment. It was being developed by a consortium including members from Japan, the United States, and Russia. As a breeder reactor, it converts thorium into nuclear fuels. An industry group presented updated plans about FUJI MSR in July 2010. They projected a cost of 2.85 cents per kilowatt hour.

The IThEMS consortium planned to first build a much smaller MiniFUJI 10 MWe reactor of the same design once it had secured an additional $300 million in funding, but IThEMS closed in 2011 after it was unable to secure adequate funding. A new company, Thorium Tech Solution (TTS), was founded in 2011 by Kazuo Furukawa, the chief scientist from IThEMS, and Masaaki Furukawa. TTS acquired the FUJI design and some related patents.

=== Chinese thorium MSR project ===
The People's Republic of China has initiated a research and development project in thorium molten-salt reactor technology. It was formally announced at the Chinese Academy of Sciences (CAS) annual conference in January 2011. Its ultimate target is to investigate and develop a thorium based molten salt nuclear system in about 20 years. An expected intermediate outcome of the TMSR research program is to build a 2 MW pebble bed fluoride salt cooled research reactor in 2015, and a 2 MW molten salt fueled research reactor in 2017. This would be followed by a 10 MW demonstrator reactor and a 100 MW pilot reactors. The project is spearheaded by Jiang Mianheng, with a start-up budget of $350 million, and has already recruited 140 PhD scientists, working full-time on thorium molten salt reactor research at the Shanghai Institute of Applied Physics. An expansion of staffing has increased to 700 as of 2015.

At the end of August 2021, the Shanghai Institute of Applied Physics (SINAP) completed the construction of a 2MW (thermal) experimental thorium molten salt reactor in Wuwei, Gansu, known as the TMSR-LF1. China plans to follow up the experiment with a 373MW version by 2030.

=== Flibe Energy ===
Kirk Sorensen, former NASA scientist and Chief Nuclear Technologist at Teledyne Brown Engineering, has been a long-time promoter of thorium fuel cycle and particularly liquid fluoride thorium reactors. He first researched thorium reactors while working at NASA, while evaluating power plant designs suitable for lunar colonies. Material about this fuel cycle was surprisingly hard to find, so in 2006 Sorensen started "energyfromthorium.com", a document repository, forum, and blog to promote this technology. In 2006, Sorensen coined the liquid fluoride thorium reactor and LFTR nomenclature to describe a subset of molten salt reactor designs based on liquid fluoride-salt fuels with breeding of thorium into uranium-233 in the thermal spectrum. In 2011, Sorensen founded Flibe Energy, a company that initially intends to develop 20–50 MW LFTR small modular reactor designs to power military bases; Sorensen noted that it is easier to promote novel military designs than civilian power station designs in the context of the modern US nuclear regulatory and political environment. An independent technology assessment coordinated with EPRI and Southern Company represents the most detailed information so far publicly available about Flibe Energy's proposed LFTR design.

=== Copenhagen Atomics ===
Copenhagen Atomics is a Danish molten salt technology company developing mass manufacturable 100MWth molten salt reactors. The Copenhagen Atomics Waste Burner is a single-fluid, heavy water moderated, fluoride-based, thermal spectrum and autonomously controlled molten-salt reactor. This is designed to fit inside of a leak-tight, 40-foot, stainless steel shipping container. The heavy water moderator is thermally insulated from the salt and continuously drained and cooled to below 50 °C (122 °F). A molten lithium-7 deuteroxide (7LiOD) moderator version is also being researched. The reactor utilizes the thorium fuel cycle using separated plutonium from spent nuclear fuel as the initial fissile load for the first generation of reactors, eventually transitioning to a thorium breeder. Copenhagen Atomics is actively developing and testing valves, pumps, heat exchangers, measurement systems, salt chemistry and purification systems, and control systems and software for molten salt applications.

In July of 2024, Copenhagen Atomics announced that their reactor is ready to be tested in a real life scenario with a critical experiment at the Paul Scherrer Institute in Switzerland in 2026.

=== Thorium Energy Generation Pty. Limited (TEG) ===
Thorium Energy Generation Pty. Limited (TEG) was an Australian research and development company dedicated to the worldwide commercial development of LFTR reactors, as well as thorium accelerator-driven systems. As of June 2015, TEG had ceased operations.

=== Alvin Weinberg Foundation ===
The Alvin Weinberg Foundation was a British charity founded in 2011, dedicated to raising awareness about the potential of thorium energy and LFTR. It was formally launched at the House of Lords on 8 September 2011. It is named after American nuclear physicist Alvin M. Weinberg, who pioneered the thorium molten salt reactor research.

=== Thorcon ===
ThorCon nuclear reactor is a proposed floating molten salt reactor, by the US-based Thorcon company. The two-reactor unit is designed to be manufactured on an assembly line in a shipyard, and to be delivered via barge to any ocean or major waterway shoreline. The reactors are to be delivered as a sealed unit and never opened on site. All reactor maintenance and fuel processing is done at an off-site location.

=== Nuclear Research and Consultancy Group ===
On 5 September 2017, the Dutch Nuclear Research and Consultancy Group announced that research on the irradiation of molten thorium fluoride salts inside the Petten high-flux reactor was underway.

== See also ==
- Generation IV reactor
- Thorium-based nuclear power
- List of small nuclear reactor designs
- Passive nuclear safety
- Small modular reactor
- Thorium Energy Alliance
- Accelerator-driven sub-critical reactor
- Energy amplifier
