= Thorium fuel cycle =

Nuclear fuel cycle

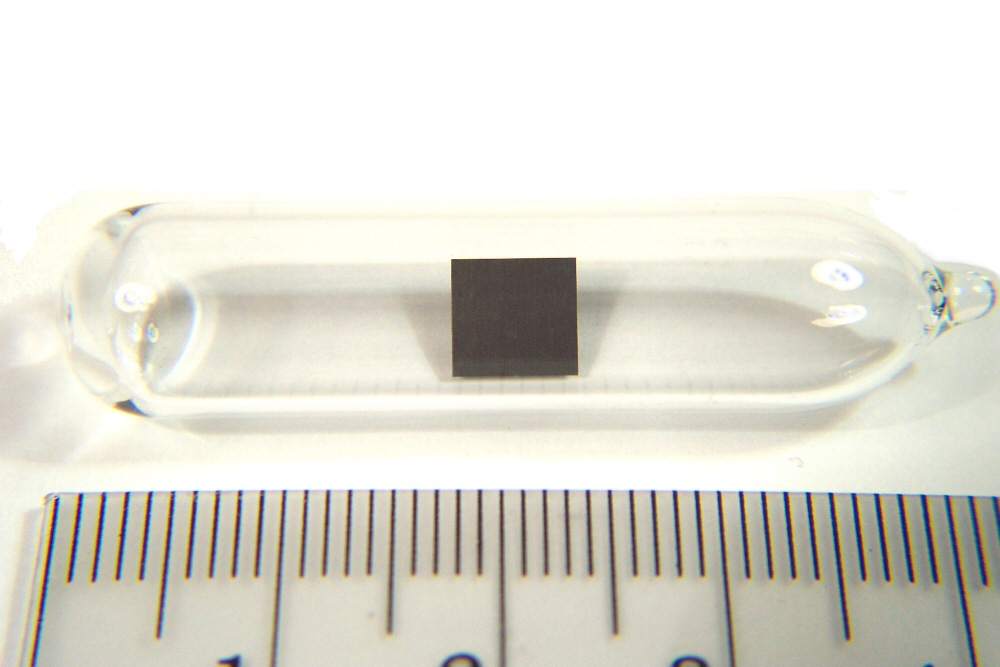
A sample of thorium

The thorium fuel cycle is a nuclear fuel cycle that uses an isotope of thorium, ^{232}Th, as the fertile material. In the reactor, ^{232}Th is transmuted into the fissile artificial uranium isotope ^{233}U which is the nuclear fuel. Unlike natural uranium, natural thorium contains only trace amounts of fissile material (such as ^{231}Th), which are insufficient to initiate a nuclear chain reaction. Additional fissile material or another neutron source is necessary to initiate the fuel cycle. In a thorium-fuelled reactor, ^{232}Th absorbs neutrons to produce ^{233}U. This parallels the process in uranium breeder reactors whereby fertile ^{238}U absorbs neutrons to form fissile ^{239}Pu. Depending on the design of the reactor and fuel cycle, the generated ^{233}U either fissions in situ or is chemically separated from the used nuclear fuel and formed into new nuclear fuel.

The thorium fuel cycle has several potential advantages over a uranium fuel cycle, including thorium's greater abundance, superior physical and nuclear properties, reduced plutonium and actinide production, and better resistance to nuclear weapons proliferation when used in a traditional light water reactor though not in a molten salt reactor.

== History ==
Concerns about the limits of worldwide uranium resources motivated initial interest in the thorium fuel cycle. It was envisioned that as uranium reserves were depleted, thorium would supplement uranium as a fertile material. However, for most countries, uranium was relatively abundant, and research in thorium fuel cycles waned. A notable exception was India's three-stage nuclear power program proposed by Homi J. Bhabha. In the twenty-first century, thorium's claimed potential for improving proliferation resistance and waste characteristics led to renewed interest in the thorium fuel cycle. While thorium is more abundant in the continental crust than uranium and easily extracted from monazite as a side product of rare earth element mining, it is much less abundant in seawater than uranium.

At Oak Ridge National Laboratory in the 1960s, the Molten-Salt Reactor Experiment used ^{233}U as the fissile fuel in an experiment to demonstrate a part of the molten salt breeder reactor that was designed to operate on the thorium fuel cycle. Molten salt reactor (MSR) experiments assessed thorium's feasibility, using thorium(IV) fluoride dissolved in a molten salt fluid that eliminated the need to fabricate fuel elements. The MSR program was defunded in 1976 after its patron Alvin Weinberg was fired.

In 1993, Carlo Rubbia proposed the concept of an energy amplifier or "accelerator driven system" (ADS), which he saw as a novel and safe way to produce nuclear energy that exploited existing accelerator technologies. Rubbia's proposal offered the potential to incinerate high-activity nuclear waste and produce energy from natural thorium and depleted uranium.

Kirk Sorensen, former NASA scientist and Chief Technologist at Flibe Energy, has been a long-time promoter of thorium fuel cycle and particularly liquid fluoride thorium reactors (LFTRs). He first researched thorium reactors while working at NASA while evaluating power plant designs suitable for lunar colonies. In 2006 Sorensen started "energyfromthorium.com" to promote and make information available about this technology.

A 2011 MIT study concluded that although there is little in the way of barriers to a thorium fuel cycle, with current or near term light-water reactor designs there is also little incentive for any significant market penetration to occur. As such they conclude there is little chance of thorium cycles replacing conventional uranium cycles in the current nuclear power market, despite the potential benefits.

== Nuclear reactions with thorium ==
In the thorium cycle, fuel is formed when ^{232}Th captures a neutron (whether in a fast reactor or thermal reactor) to become ^{233}Th. This normally emits an electron and an anti-neutrino (ν̅) by β^{−} decay to become ^{233}Pa. This then emits another electron and anti-neutrino by a second β^{−} decay to become ^{233}U, the fuel:

$$\ce{\overset{neutron}{n}+{^{232}_{90}Th} -> {^{233}_{90}Th} ->[\beta^-] {^{233}_{91}Pa} ->[\beta^-] \overset{fuel}{^{233}_{92}U}}$$

=== Fission product waste ===
Nuclear fission produces radioactive fission products which can have half-lives from days to greater than 200,000 years. According to some toxicity studies, the thorium cycle can fully recycle actinide wastes and only emit fission product wastes, and after a few hundred years, the waste from a thorium reactor can be less toxic than the uranium ore that would have been used to produce low enriched uranium fuel for a light water reactor of the same power.

Other studies assume some actinide losses and find that actinide wastes dominate thorium cycle waste radioactivity at some future periods. Some fission products have been proposed for nuclear transmutation, which would further reduce the amount of nuclear waste and the duration during which it would have to be stored (whether in a deep geological repository or elsewhere). However, while the principal feasibility of some of those reactions has been demonstrated at laboratory scale, there is, as of 2024, no large scale deliberate transmutation of fission products anywhere in the world, and the upcoming MYRRHA research project into transmutation is mostly focused on transuranic waste. Furthermore, the cross section of some fission products is relatively low and others - such as caesium - are present as a mixture of stable, short lived and long lived isotopes in nuclear waste, making transmutation dependent on expensive isotope separation.

=== Actinide waste ===
In a reactor, when a neutron hits a fissile atom (such as certain isotopes of uranium), it either splits the nucleus or is captured and transmutes the atom. In the case of ^{233}U, the transmutations tend to produce useful nuclear fuels rather than transuranic waste. When ^{233}U absorbs a neutron, it either fissions or becomes ^{234}U. The chance of fissioning on absorption of a thermal neutron is about 92%; the capture-to-fission ratio of ^{233}U, therefore, is about 1:12 – which is better than the corresponding capture vs. fission ratios of ^{235}U (about 1:6), or ^{239}Pu or ^{241}Pu (both about 1:3). The result is less transuranic waste than in a reactor using the uranium-plutonium fuel cycle.

Transmutations in the thorium fuel cycle
														**^{237}Np**
														↑
		^{231}U	←	^{232}U	↔	^{233}U	↔	^{234}U	↔	**^{235}U**	↔	**^{236}U**	→	^{237}U
		↓		↑		↑		↑
		^{231}Pa	→	^{232}Pa	←	^{233}Pa	→	^{234}Pa
		↑				↑
^{230}Th	→	^{231}Th	←	**^{232}Th**	→	^{233}Th
Nuclides with a yellow background in italic have half-lives under 30 days; Nuclides in **bold** have half-lives over 1,000,000 years; Nuclides in red frames are fissile

^{234}U, like most actinides with an even number of neutrons, is not fissile, but neutron capture produces fissile ^{235}U. If the fissile isotope fails to fission on neutron capture, it produces ^{236}U, ^{237}Np, ^{238}Pu, and eventually fissile ^{239}Pu and heavier isotopes of plutonium. The ^{237}Np can be removed and stored as waste or retained and transmuted to plutonium, where more of it fissions, while the remainder becomes ^{242}Pu, then americium and curium, which in turn can be removed as waste or returned to reactors for further transmutation and fission.

However, the ^{231}Pa (with a half-life of 3.27×10^{4} years) formed via (n,2n) reactions with ^{232}Th (yielding ^{231}Th that decays to ^{231}Pa), while not a transuranic waste, is a major contributor to the long-term radiotoxicity of spent nuclear fuel. While ^{231}Pa can in principle be converted back to ^{232}Th by neutron absorption, its neutron absorption cross section is relatively low, making this rather difficult and possibly uneconomic.

=== Uranium-232 contamination ===
^{232}U is also formed in this process, via (n,2n) reactions between fast neutrons and ^{233}U, ^{233}Pa, and ^{232}Th:

$$\begin{align}{}\\
\ce{{^{232}_{90}Th} ->[+n] {^{233}_{90}Th} ->[\beta^-] {^{233}_{91}Pa} \text{ } ->[\beta^-] {^{233}_{92}U} ->[+n-2n] {^{232}_{92}U}}\\
\ce{{^{232}_{90}Th} ->[+n] {^{233}_{90}Th} ->[\beta^-] {^{233}_{91}Pa} \text{ } ->[+n-2n] {^{232}_{91}Pa} ->[\beta^-] {^{232}_{92}U}}\\
\ce{{^{232}_{90}Th} ->[+n-2n] {^{231}_{90}Th} ->[\beta^-] {^{231}_{91}Pa} \text{ } ->[+n] {^{232}_{91}Pa} ->[\beta^-] {^{232}_{92}U}}\\{}
\end{align}$$

Unlike most even numbered heavy isotopes, ^{232}U is also a fissile fuel fissioning just over half the time when it absorbs a thermal neutron. ^{232}U has a relatively short half-life (68.9 years), and some decay products emit high energy gamma radiation, such as ^{220}Rn, ^{212}Bi and particularly ^{208}Tl. The full decay chain, along with half-lives and relevant gamma energies, is:

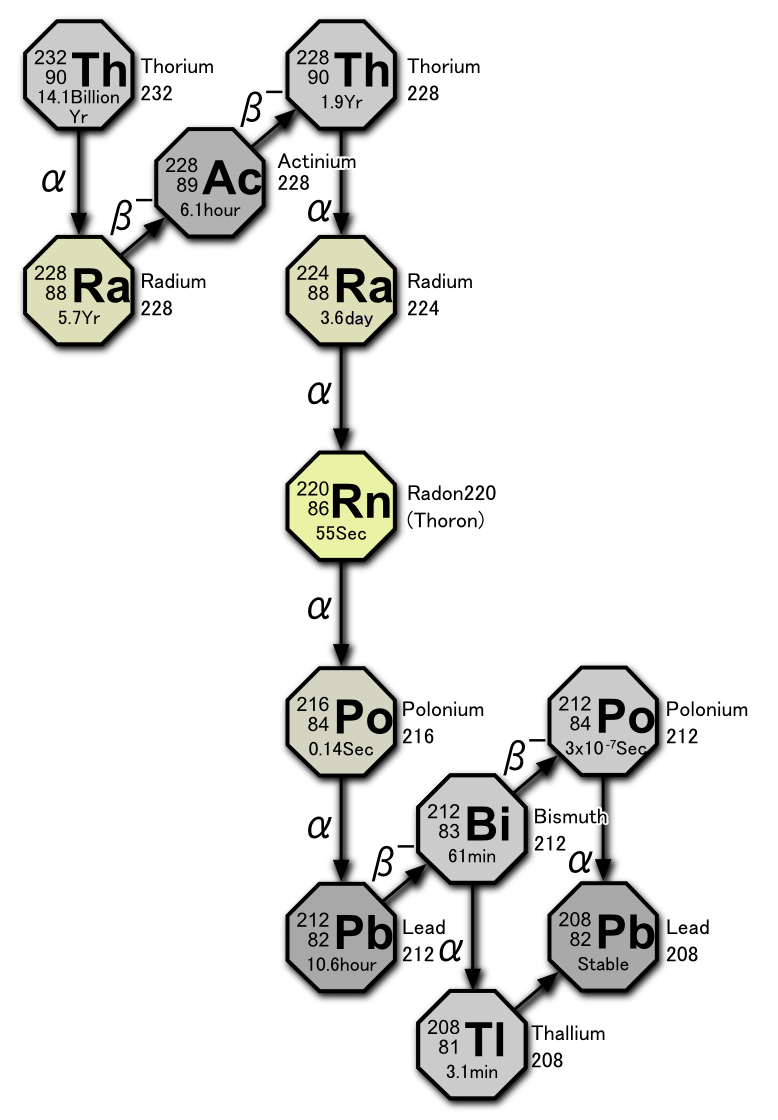
The 4n decay chain of ^{232}Th, commonly called the "thorium series"

^{232}U decays to ^{228}Th where it joins the decay chain of ^{232}Th

$$\begin{align}{}\\
\ce{^{232}_{92}U  ->[\alpha]  ^{228}_{90}Th}\ &\mathrm{(68.9\ years)}\\
\ce{^{228}_{90}Th ->[\alpha]  ^{224}_{88}Ra}\ &\mathrm{(1.9\ year)}\\
\ce{^{224}_{88}Ra ->[\alpha]  ^{220}_{86}Rn}\ &\mathrm{(3.6\ day,\ 0.24\ MeV)}\\
\ce{^{220}_{86}Rn ->[\alpha]  ^{216}_{84}Po}\ &\mathrm{(55\ s,\ 0.54\ MeV)}\\
\ce{^{216}_{84}Po ->[\alpha]  ^{212}_{82}Pb}\ &\mathrm{(0.15\ s)}\\
\ce{^{212}_{82}Pb ->[\beta^-] ^{212}_{83}Bi}\ &\mathrm{(10.64\ h)}\\
\ce{^{212}_{83}Bi ->[\alpha]  ^{208}_{81}Tl}\ &\mathrm{(61\ m,\ 0.78\ MeV)}\\
\ce{^{208}_{81}Tl ->[\beta^-] ^{208}_{82}Pb}\ &\mathrm{(3\ m,\ 2.6\ MeV)}\\{}
\end{align}$$

Thorium-cycle fuels produce hard gamma emissions, which damage electronics, limiting their use in bombs. ^{232}U cannot be chemically separated from ^{233}U from used nuclear fuel; however, chemical separation of thorium from uranium removes the decay product ^{228}Th and the radiation from the rest of the decay chain, which gradually build up as ^{228}Th reaccumulates. The contamination could also be avoided by using a molten-salt breeder reactor and separating the ^{233}Pa before it decays into ^{233}U. The hard gamma emissions also create a radiological hazard which requires remote handling during reprocessing.

== Nuclear fuel ==
As a fertile material thorium is similar to ^{238}U, the major part of natural and depleted uranium. The thermal neutron absorption cross section (σ_{a}) and resonance integral (average of neutron cross sections over intermediate neutron energies) for ^{232}Th are about three and one third times those of the respective values for ^{238}U.

=== Advantages ===
The primary physical advantage of thorium fuel is that it uniquely makes possible a breeder reactor that runs with slow neutrons, otherwise known as a thermal breeder reactor. These reactors are often considered simpler than the more traditional fast-neutron breeders. Although the thermal neutron fission cross section (σ_{f}) of the resulting ^{233}U is comparable to ^{235}U and ^{239}Pu, it has a much lower capture cross section (σ_{γ}) than the latter two fissile isotopes, providing fewer non-fissile neutron absorptions and improved neutron economy. The ratio of neutrons released per neutron absorbed (η) in ^{233}U is greater than two over a wide range of energies, including the thermal spectrum. A breeding reactor in the uranium–plutonium cycle needs to use fast neutrons, because in the thermal spectrum one neutron absorbed by ^{239}Pu on average leads to less than two neutrons.

Thorium is estimated to be about three to four times more abundant than uranium in Earth's crust, although present knowledge of reserves is limited. Current demand for thorium has been satisfied as a by-product of rare-earth extraction from monazite sands. Notably, there is very little thorium dissolved in seawater, so seawater extraction is not viable, as it is with uranium. Using breeder reactors, known thorium and uranium resources can both generate world-scale energy for thousands of years.

Thorium-based fuels also display favourable physical and chemical properties that improve reactor and repository performance. Compared to the predominant reactor fuel, uranium dioxide (UO_{2}), thorium dioxide (ThO_{2}) has a higher melting point, higher thermal conductivity, and lower coefficient of thermal expansion. Thorium dioxide also exhibits greater chemical stability and, unlike uranium dioxide, does not further oxidise.

Because the ^{233}U produced in thorium fuels is significantly contaminated with ^{232}U in proposed power reactor designs, thorium-based used nuclear fuel possesses inherent proliferation resistance. ^{232}U cannot be chemically separated from ^{233}U and has several decay products that emit high-energy gamma radiation. These high-energy photons are a radiological hazard that necessitate the use of remote handling of separated uranium and aid in the passive detection of such materials.

The long-term (on the order of roughly 10^{3} to 10^{6} years) radiological hazard of conventional uranium-based used nuclear fuel is dominated by plutonium and other minor actinides, after which long-lived fission products become significant contributors again. A single neutron capture in ^{238}U is sufficient to produce transuranic elements, whereas five captures are generally necessary to do so from ^{232}Th. 98–99% of thorium-cycle fuel nuclei would fission at either ^{233}U or ^{235}U, so fewer long-lived transuranics are produced. Because of this, thorium is a potentially attractive alternative to uranium in mixed oxide (MOX) fuels to minimise the generation of transuranics and maximise the destruction of plutonium.

=== Disadvantages ===
There are several challenges to the application of thorium as a nuclear fuel, particularly for solid fuel reactors:

In contrast to uranium, naturally occurring thorium is effectively mononuclidic and contains no fissile isotopes; fissile material, generally ^{233}U, ^{235}U or plutonium, must be added to achieve criticality. This, along with the high sintering temperature necessary to make thorium-dioxide fuel, complicates fuel fabrication. Oak Ridge National Laboratory experimented with thorium tetrafluoride as fuel in a molten salt reactor from 1964 to 1969, which was expected to be easier to process and separate from contaminants that slow or stop the chain reaction.

In an open fuel cycle (i.e. using ^{233}U in situ), higher burnup is necessary to achieve a favourable neutron economy. Although thorium dioxide performed well at burnups of 170,000 MWd/t and 150,000 MWd/t at Fort St. Vrain Generating Station and AVR respectively, challenges complicate achieving this in light water reactors (LWR), which compose the vast majority of existing power reactors.

In a once-through thorium fuel cycle, thorium-based fuels produce far less long-lived transuranics than uranium-based fuels, but some long-lived actinide products still constitute a long-term radiological impact, especially ^{231}Pa and ^{233}U. In a closed cycle,^{233}U and ^{231}Pa can be reprocessed. ^{231}Pa is also considered an excellent burnable poison absorber in light water reactors.

Another challenge associated with the thorium fuel cycle is the comparatively long interval over which ^{232}Th breeds to ^{233}U. The half-life of ^{233}Pa is about 27 days, which is an order of magnitude longer than the half-life of ^{239}Np. As a result, substantial ^{233}Pa develops in thorium-based fuels. ^{233}Pa is a significant neutron absorber and, although it eventually breeds into fissile ^{235}U, this requires two more neutron absorptions, which degrades neutron economy and increases the likelihood of transuranic production.

Alternatively, if solid thorium is used in a closed fuel cycle in which ^{233}U is recycled, remote handling is necessary for fuel fabrication because of the high radiation levels resulting from the decay products of ^{232}U. This is also true of recycled thorium because of the presence of ^{228}Th, which is part of the ^{232}U decay sequence. Further, unlike proven uranium fuel recycling technology (e.g. PUREX), recycling technology for thorium (e.g. THOREX) is only under development.

Although the presence of ^{232}U complicates matters, there are public documents showing that ^{233}U has been used once in a nuclear weapon test. The United States tested a composite ^{233}U-plutonium bomb core in the MET (Military Effects Test) blast during Operation Teapot in 1955, though with much lower yield than expected.

Advocates for liquid core and molten salt reactors such as LFTRs claim that these technologies negate thorium's disadvantages present in solid fuelled reactors. As only two liquid-core fluoride salt reactors have been built (the ORNL ARE and MSRE) and neither have used thorium, it is hard to validate the exact benefits.

== Thorium-fuelled reactors ==
Thorium fuels have fuelled several different reactor types, including light water reactors, heavy water reactors, high temperature gas reactors, sodium-cooled fast reactors, and molten salt reactors.

=== List of thorium-fuelled reactors ===
(From IAEA TECDOC-1450 "Thorium Fuel Cycle – Potential Benefits and Challenges", Table 1: Thorium utilization in different experimental and power reactors. Additionally from Energy Information Administration, "Spent Nuclear Fuel Discharges from U. S. Reactors", Table B4: Dresden 1 Assembly Class.)

Name	Operation period	Country	Reactor type	Power	Fuel
NRX & NRU	1947 (NRX) + 1957 (NRU); Irradiation–testing of few fuel elements	Canada	MTR (pin assemblies)	20 MW; 200 MW (see)	Th+^{235}U, Test Fuel
Dresden Unit 1	1960–1978	United States	BWR	197 MW(e)	ThO_{2} corner rods, UO_{2} clad in Zircaloy-2 tube
CIRUS; DHRUVA; & KAMINI	1960–2010 (CIRUS); others in operation	India	MTR thermal	40 MWt; 100 MWt; 30 kWt (low power, research)	Al+^{233}U Driver fuel, ‘J’ rod of Th & ThO2, ‘J’ rod of ThO_{2}
Indian Point Unit 1	1962–1965	United States	LWBR, PWR, (pin assemblies)	285 MW(e)	Th+^{235}U Driver fuel, oxide pellets
BORAX-IV & Elk River Station	1963–1968	United States	BWR (pin assemblies)	2.4 MW(e); 24 MW(e)	Th+^{235}U Driver fuel oxide pellets
MSRE ORNL	1964–1969	United States	MSR	7.5 MWt	^{233}U molten fluorides
Peach Bottom Unit 1	1966–1972	United States	HTGR, Experimental (prismatic block)	40 MW(e)	Th+^{235}U Driver fuel, coated fuel particles, oxide & dicarbides
Dragon (OECD-Euratom)	1966–1973	(United Kingdom) UK (also Sweden, Norway and Switzerland)	HTGR, Experimental (pin-in-block design)	20 MWt	Th+^{235}U Driver fuel, coated fuel particles, oxide & dicarbides
AVR	1967–1988	Germany (West)	HTGR, experimental (pebble bed reactor)	15 MW(e)	Th+^{235}U Driver fuel, coated fuel particles, oxide & dicarbides
Lingen	1968–1973	Germany (West)	BWR irradiation-testing	60 MW(e)	Test fuel (Th,Pu)O_{2} pellets
SUSPOP/KSTR KEMA	1974–1977	Netherlands	Aqueous homogeneous suspension (pin assemblies)	1 MWt	Th+HEU, oxide pellets
Fort St Vrain	1976–1989	United States	HTGR, Power (prismatic block)	330 MW(e)	Th+^{235}U Driver fuel, coated fuel particles, Dicarbide
Shippingport	1977–1982	United States	LWBR, PWR, (pin assemblies)	100 MW(e)	Th+^{233}U Driver fuel, oxide pellets
KAPS 1 &2; KGS 1 & 2; RAPS 2, 3 & 4	1980 (RAPS 2) +; continuing in all new PHWRs	India	PHWR, (pin assemblies)	220 MW(e)	ThO_{2} pellets (for neutron flux flattening of initial core after start-up)
FBTR	1985; in operation	India	LMFBR, (pin assemblies)	40 MWt	ThO_{2} blanket
THTR-300	1985–1989	Germany (West)	HTGR, power (pebble type)	300 MW(e)	Th+^{235}U Driver fuel, coated fuel particles, oxide & dicarbides
TMSR-LF1	2023; in operation	China	Liquid fuel thorium-based molten salt experimental reactor	2 MWt	Thorium-based molten salt
Petten	2024; planned	Netherlands	High Flux Reactor thorium molten salt experiment	45 MW(e)	?
SINAP	2030; planned	China	thorium-based molten-salt reactor	10 MWt	Thorium-based molten salt

== See also ==
- Thorium
- Thorium-232
- Occurrence of thorium
- Thorium-based nuclear power
- List of countries by thorium resources
- List of countries by uranium reserves
- Advanced heavy-water reactor
- Alvin Radkowsky
- CANDU reactor
- Fuji MSR
- Peak uranium
- Radioactive waste
- Thorium Energy Alliance
- Weinberg Foundation
- World energy resources and consumption
