= List of countries by thorium resources =

Thorium resources are the estimated mineral reserves of thorium on Earth. Thorium is a future potential source of low-carbon energy. Thorium has been demonstrated to perform as a nuclear fuel in several reactor designs. It is present with a higher abundance than uranium in the crust of the earth. Thorium resources have not been estimated and assessed with a higher level of confidence, as in the case of uranium. Approximately 6 million tonnes of thorium have been estimated globally based on currently limited exploration and mainly on historical data.

Thorium resources are found widely in over 35 countries all over the world, with India leading the chart. As there is currently negligible commercial use of thorium, the resources should be considered potentially viable according to the United Nations Framework Classification for Resources. Figures are given in metric tonnes of thorium metal.

Country	Total thorium resources (tonnes Th)	Per capita thorium (kg/person)	Source
Angola	10,000	0.25	
Argentina	35,910	0.78	
Australia	595,000	22.8	
Brazil	632,000	2.96	
Canada	172,000	4.25	
China	300,000	0.21	
DR Congo	2,500	0.02	
Egypt	380,000	3.16	
Finland	60,000	10.9	
France	1,000	0.015	
Greenland (Denmark)	86,000	1510	
India	846,477	0.57	
Iran	30,000	0.32	
Kenya	8,000	0.14	
Kazakhstan	50,000	2.63	
Madagascar	22,000	0.71	
Malawi	9,000	0.45	
Malaysia	18,000	0.53	
Morocco	30,000	0.77	
Mozambique	10,000	0.30	
Nigeria	29,000	0.12	
Norway	87,000	15.8	
Peru	20,000	0.60	
Russia	155,000	1.08	
South Africa	148,000	2.26	
South Korea	6,000	0.12	
Sri Lanka	4,000	0.18	
Sweden	50,000	4.75	
Taiwan	9,000	0.38	
Thailand	10,000	0.14	
Turkey	381,000	4.33	
United States	595,000	1.70	
Uruguay	3,000	0.86	
Uzbekistan	5,000	0.14	
Venezuela	300,000	10.5	
Vietnam	5,000	0.05	
Others (Africa)	1,000		
Others (CIS) (excluding Russia, Kazakhstan and Uzbekistan)	1,340,000		
Total	6,245,887		

== See also ==
- Thorium
- Occurrence of thorium
- List of countries by uranium reserves
- Thorium fuel cycle
- Thorium-based nuclear power
- Thorium Energy Alliance
- Nuclear power

== Sources ==
- International Atomic Energy Agency (2019). World Thorium Occurrences, Deposits and Resources (PDF) (Report).
