= CCGT =

CCGT may refer to:

- Combined cycle gas turbine, a type of combined cycle power plant commonly used for high efficiency, fast responding electricity generators
- Closed-cycle gas turbine (but combined cycle, see above, is the more common usage for gas turbines)
- Koenigsegg CCGT, race car
