= Molten-Salt Reactor Experiment =

Nuclear reactor, Oak Ridge 1965–1969

Coordinates: 35°55′18″N 84°18′24″W

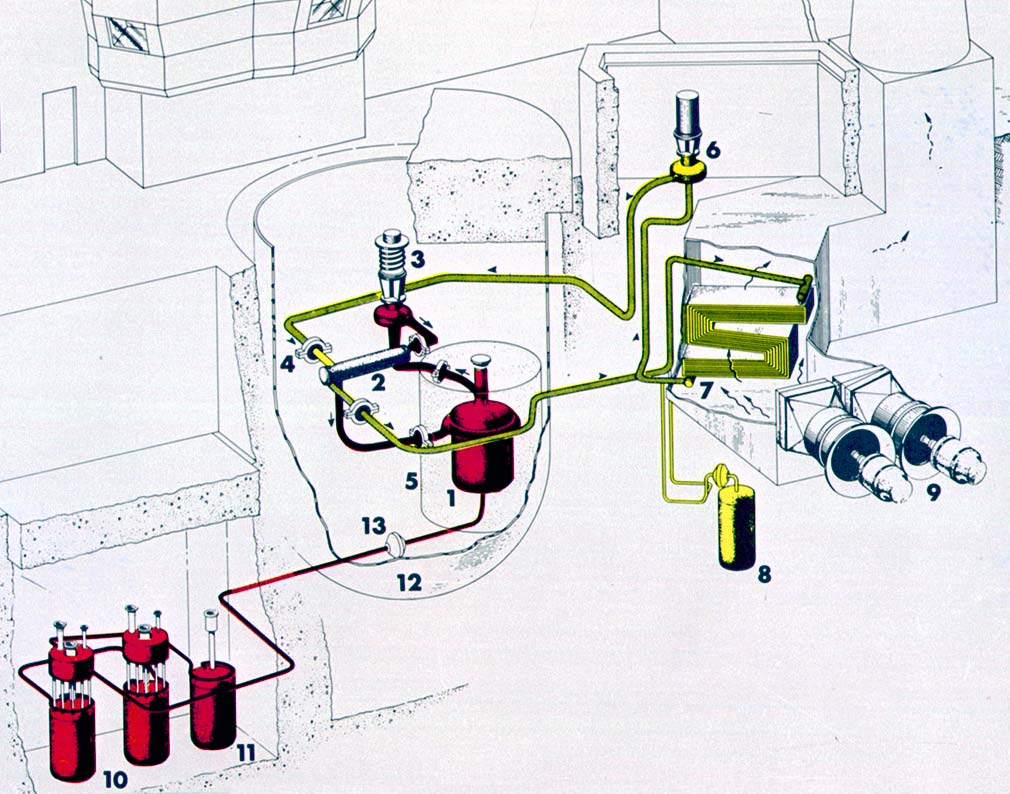
MSRE plant diagram: (1) Reactor vessel, (2) Heat exchanger, (3) Fuel pump, (4) Freeze flange, (5) Thermal shield, (6) Coolant pump, (7) Radiator, (8) Coolant drain tank, (9) Fans, (10) Fuel drain tanks, (11) Flush tank, (12) Containment vessel, (13) Freeze valve. Also note Control area in upper left and Chimney upper right.

The Molten-Salt Reactor Experiment (MSRE) was an experimental molten-salt reactor research reactor at the Oak Ridge National Laboratory (ORNL) in Oak Ridge, Tennessee. This technology was researched through the 1960s, the reactor was constructed by 1964, it went critical in 1965, and was operated until 1969. The costs of a cleanup project were estimated at $130 million.

Initially designed for 15 MW_{th}, the MSRE was operated at 7.4 MW_{th} because of imprecise nuclear cross section data. It was a test reactor simulating the neutronic "kernel" of a type of inherently safer epithermal thorium breeder reactor called the liquid fluoride thorium reactor. It primarily used two fuels: first uranium-235 and later uranium-233. The latter ^{233}UF_{4} was the result of breeding from thorium in other reactors. Since this was an engineering test, the large, expensive breeding blanket of thorium salt was omitted in favor of neutron measurements.

In the MSRE, the heat from the reactor core was shed via a cooling system using air blown over radiators. It is thought similar reactors could power high-efficiency heat engines such as closed-cycle gas turbines. The MSRE's piping, core vat and structural components were made from Hastelloy-N, and its moderator was a pyrolytic graphite core. The fuel for the MSRE was LiF-BeF_{2}-ZrF_{4}-UF_{4} (65-29.1-5-0.9 mole %). The secondary coolant was FLiBe (2LiF-BeF_{2}), and it operated as hot as 650 °C and operated for the equivalent of about 1.5 years of full power operation.

The result promised to be a simple, reliable reactor. The purpose of the Molten-Salt Reactor Experiment was to demonstrate that some key features of the proposed molten-salt power reactors could be embodied in a practical reactor that could be operated safely and reliably and be maintained without excessive difficulty. For simplicity, it was to be a fairly small, one-fluid (i.e. non-breeding) reactor operating at 10 MW_{th} or less, with heat rejection to the air via a secondary (fuel-free) salt.

== Reactor description ==
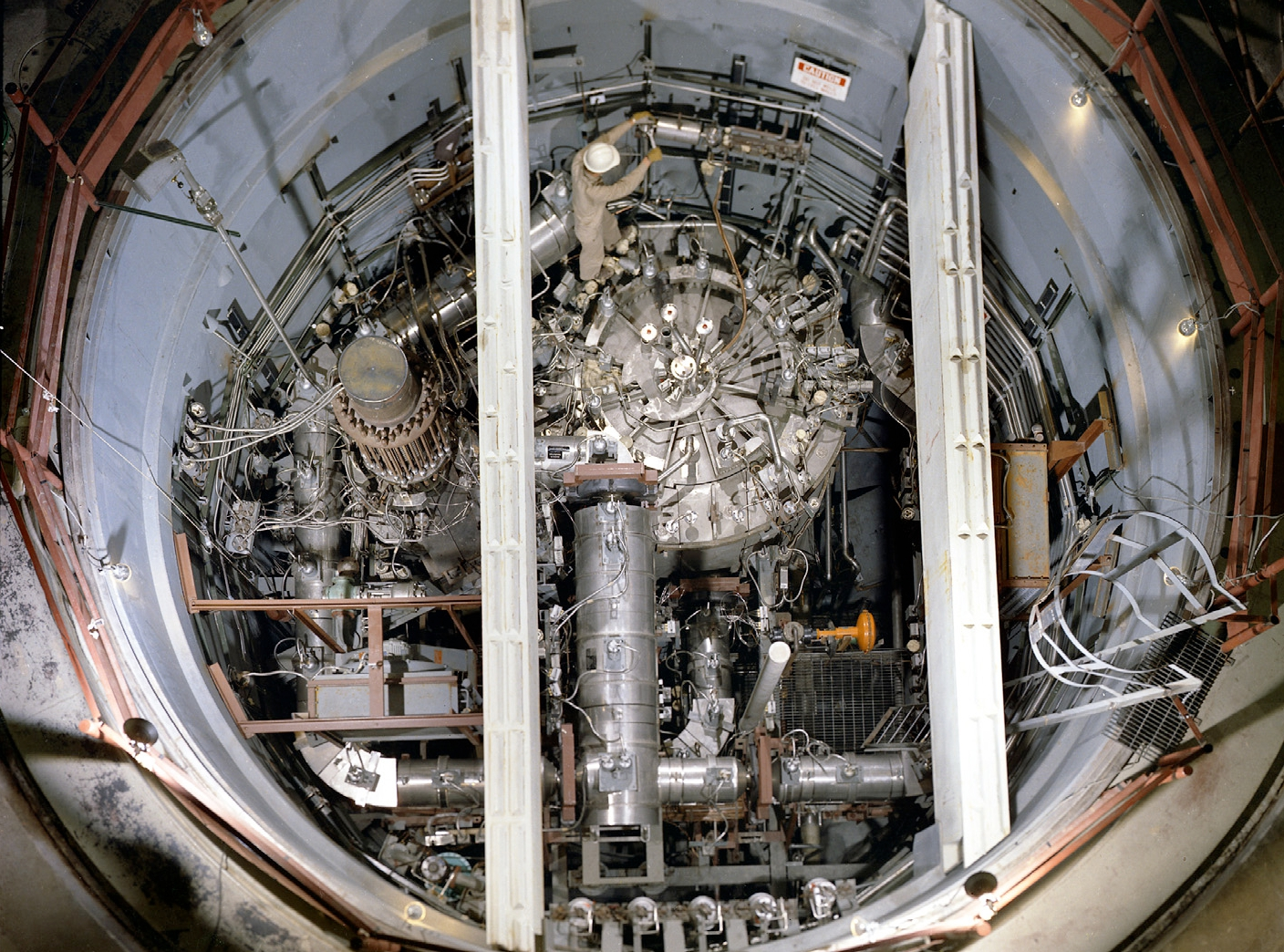
Molten salt reactor

=== Core ===
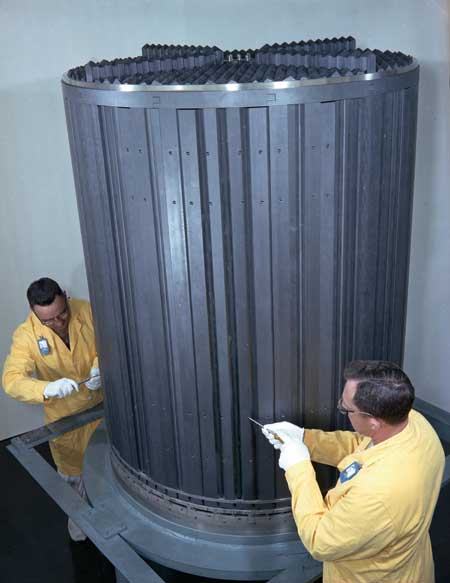
Graphite MSRE core

The pyrolytic graphite core, grade CGB, also served as the moderator. Before the MSRE development began, tests had shown that salt would not permeate graphite in which the pores were on the order of a micrometer. However, graphite with the desired pore structure was available only in small, experimentally prepared pieces, and when a manufacturer set out to produce a new grade (CGB) to meet the MSRE requirements, difficulties were encountered.

=== Fuel ===
The fuel was ^{7}LiF-BeF_{2}-ZrF_{4}-UF_{4} (65-29.1-5-0.9 mole %). The first fuel was 33% ^{235}U; later a smaller amount of ^{233}UF_{4} was used. By 1960 a better understanding of fluoride salt based molten-salt reactors had emerged from earlier molten salt reactor research for the Aircraft Reactor Experiment. Fluoride salts are strongly ionic, and when melted they are stable at high temperatures, low pressures, and high radiation fluxes. Stability at low pressure permits less robust reactor vessels and increases reliability. The high reactivity of fluorine traps most fission reaction byproducts. It appeared that the fluid salt would permit on-site chemical separation of the fuel and wastes.

The fuel system was located in sealed cells, laid out for maintenance with long-handled tools through openings in the top shielding. A tank of LiF-BeF_{2} salt was used to flush the fuel circulating system before and after maintenance. In a cell adjacent to the reactor was a simple facility for bubbling gas through the fuel or flush salt: H_{2}-hydrogen fluoride mixture, in roughly 10:1 ratio, to remove oxide, fluorine to remove uranium as uranium hexafluoride.

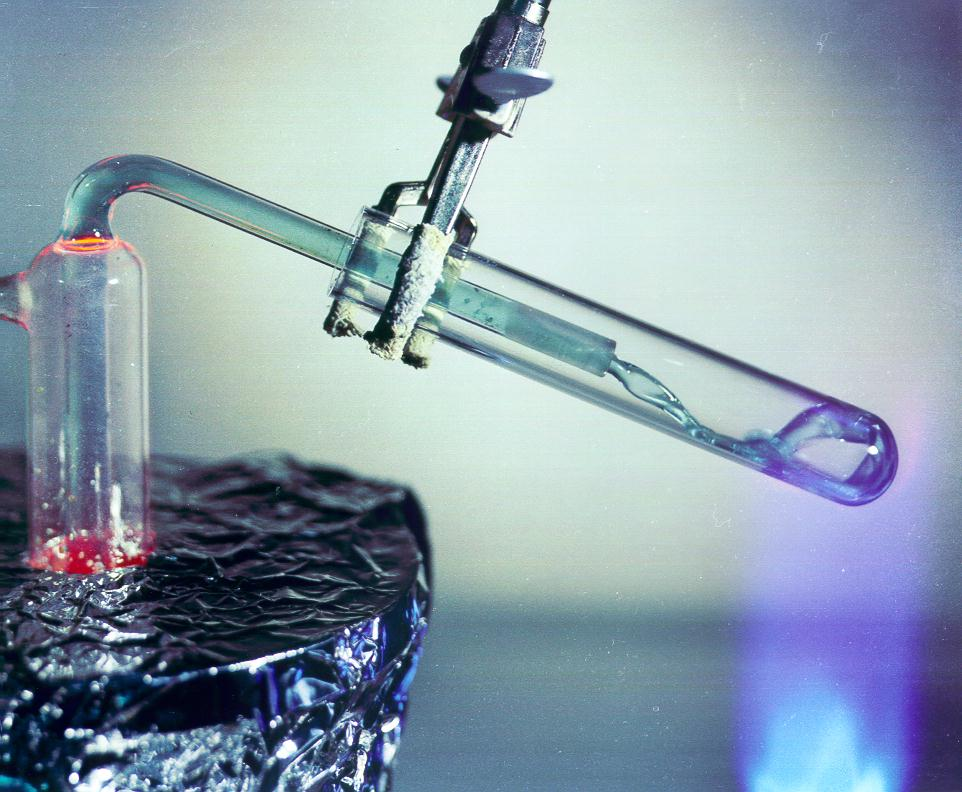
Molten FLiBe

The secondary coolant was LiF-BeF_{2} (66–34 mole %).

=== Pump ===
The bowl of the fuel pump was the surge space for the circulating loop, and here about 50 US gallons per minute (190 L/min) of fuel was sprayed into the gas space to allow xenon and krypton to escape from the salt. Removing the most significant neutron poison xenon-135 made the reactor safer and easier to restart. In solid-fuel reactors, on restart the ^{135}Xe in the fuel absorbs neutrons, followed by a sudden jump in reactivity as the ^{135}Xe is burned out. Conventional reactors may have to wait hours until xenon-135 decays after shutting down and not immediately restarting (so-called iodine pit).

Also in the pump bowl was a port through which salt samples could be taken or capsules of concentrated fuel-enriching salt (UF_{4}-LiF or PuF_{3}) could be introduced.

=== Air-cooled heat exchangers ===
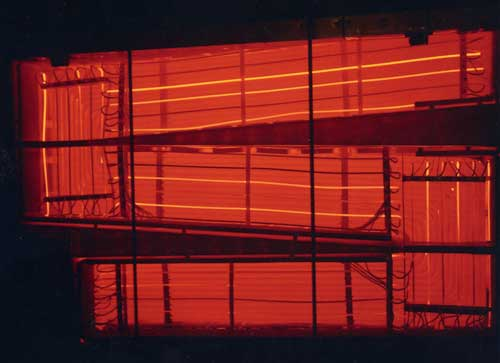
MSRE air-cooled heat exchanger glowing a dull red hue to high temperature.

At the time, the high temperatures were seen almost as a disadvantage because they hampered use of conventional steam turbines. Now, such temperatures are seen as an opportunity to use high-efficiency closed-cycle gas turbines. After two months of high-power operation, the reactor was down for 3 months because of the failure of one of the main cooling blowers.

=== Neutronics and thermal-hydraulics ===
The reactor experienced stable neutronic operation. If temperatures increased or bubbles formed, the volume of the fluid fuel salts would increase and some fluid fuel salts would be forced out of the core, thereby reducing the reactivity. The MSRE development program did not include reactor physics experiments or heat transfer measurements. There was enough latitude in the MSRE that deviations from predictions would not compromise safety or accomplishment of the objectives of the experimental reactor.

=== Building grounds ===
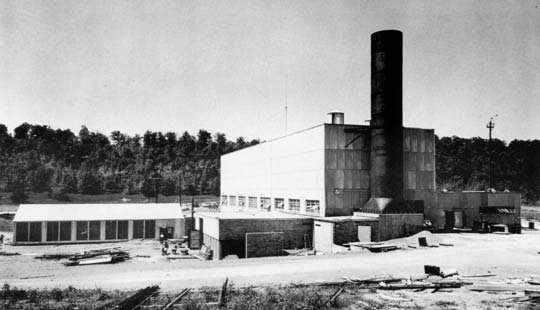
Aircraft Reactor Experiment building at ORNL that was retrofitted to house the MSRE.

Construction of the primary system components and alterations of the old Aircraft Reactor Experiment building (which had been partly remodeled for a proposed 60 MW_{th} aircraft reactor) were started in 1962. Installation of the salt systems was completed in mid-1964. ORNL was responsible for quality assurance, planning, and management of construction. The primary systems were installed by ORNL personnel; subcontractors modified the building and installed ancillary systems.

=== Structural alloy Hastelloy-N ===
Hastelloy-N—a low chromium, nickel–molybdenum alloy—was used in the MSRE and proved compatible with the fluoride salts FLiBe and FLiNaK. All metal parts contacting salt were made of Hastelloy-N. The choice of Hastelloy-N for the MSRE was on the basis of the promising results of tests at aircraft nuclear propulsion conditions and the availability of much of the required metallurgical data. Development for the MSRE generated the further data required for ASME code approval. It also included preparation of standards for Hastelloy-N procurement and for component fabrication.

Almost 200,000 lb (90,000 kg) in a variety of shapes of material for the MSRE were produced commercially. Requests for bids on component fabrication went to several companies in the nuclear fabrication industry, but all declined to submit lump-sum bids because of lack of experience with the new alloy. Consequently, all major components were fabricated in U.S. Atomic Energy Commission-owned shops at Oak Ridge and Paducah, Kentucky.

At the time that design stresses were set for the MSRE, the data that was available indicated that the strength and creep rate of Hastelloy-N were hardly affected by irradiation. After the construction was well along, the stress-rupture life and fracture strain were found to be drastically reduced by thermal neutron irradiation. The MSRE stresses were reanalyzed, and it was concluded that the reactor would have adequate life to reach its goals. At the same time a program was launched to improve the resistance of Hastelloy-N to the embrittlement.

An out-of-pile corrosion test program was carried out for Hastelloy-N, which indicated extremely low corrosion rates at MSRE conditions. Capsules exposed in the Materials Testing Reactor showed that salt fission power densities of more than 200 W/cm^{3} had no adverse effects on compatibility of fuel salt, Hastelloy-N, and graphite. Fluorine gas was found to be produced by radiolysis of frozen salts, but only at temperatures below about 212 °F (100 °C).

Components that were developed especially for the MSRE included flanges for 5-inch (130 mm) lines carrying molten salt, freeze valves (an air-cooled section where salt could be frozen and thawed), flexible control rods to operate in thimbles at 1,200 °F (649 °C), and the fuel sampler-enricher. Centrifugal pumps were developed similar to those used successfully in the aircraft reactor program, but with provisions for remote maintenance, and including a spray system for xenon removal. Remote maintenance considerations pervaded the MSRE design, and developments included devices for remotely cutting and brazing together 1 1/2 inches (38 mm) pipe, removable heater-insulation units, and equipment for removing specimens of metal and graphite from the core.

=== Development and construction ===
Most of the MSRE effort from 1960 through 1964 was devoted to design, development, and construction of the MSRE. Production and further testing of graphite and Hastelloy-N, both in-pile and out, were major development activities. Others included work on reactor chemistry, development of fabrication techniques for Hastelloy-N, development of reactor components, and remote-maintenance planning and preparations.

== Operation ==
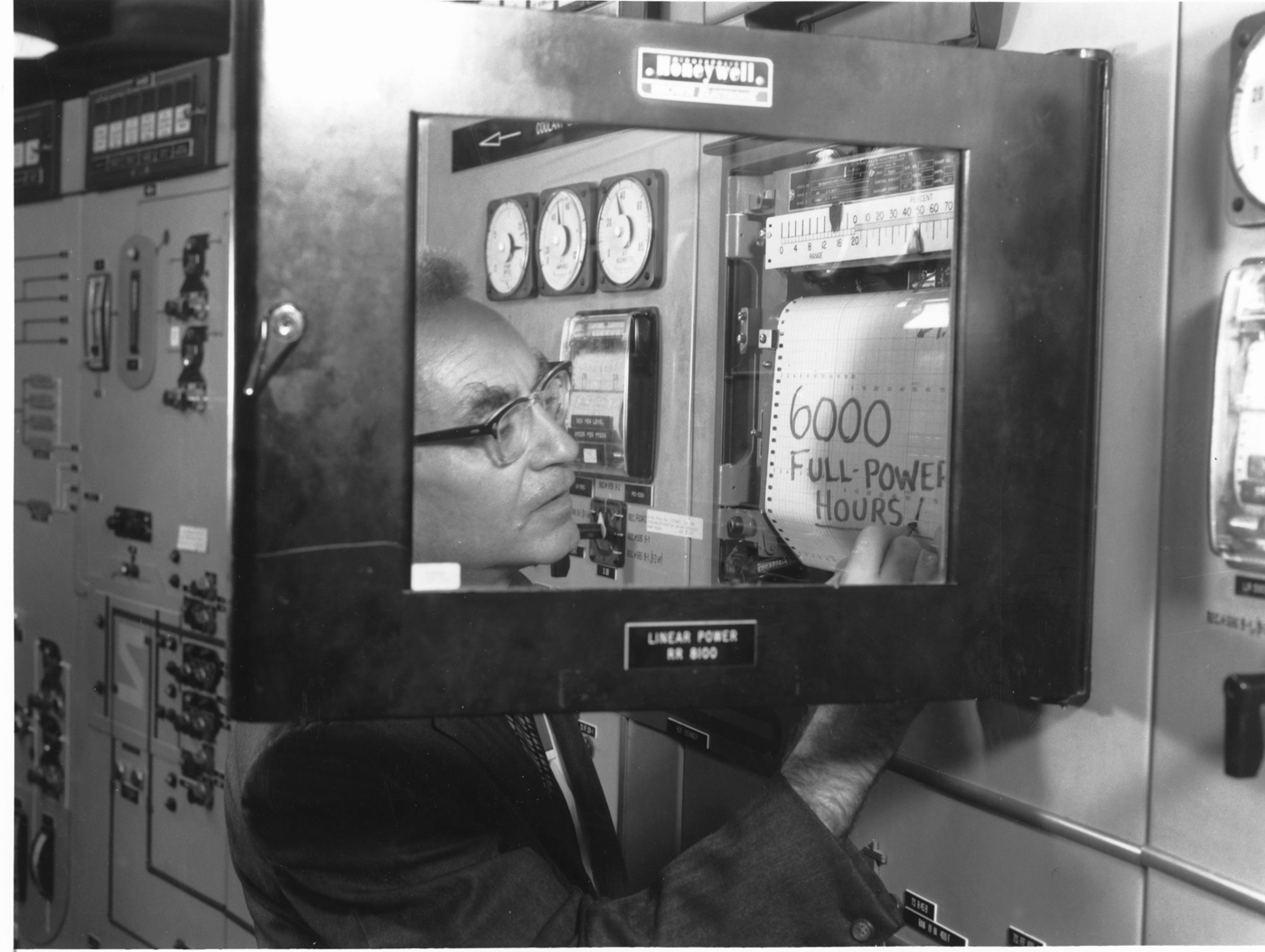
Alvin M. Weinberg noting "6000 full-power hours!" of MSRE operation, in 1967.

The MSRE operated for 5 years. The salt was loaded in 1964, and nuclear operation ended in December 1969, and all the objectives of the experiment were achieved during this period.

Checkout and prenuclear tests included 1,000 hours of circulation of flush salt and fuel carrier salt. Nuclear testing of the MSRE began in June 1965, with the addition of enriched ^{235}U as UF_{4}-LiF eutectic to the carrier salt to make the reactor critical. After zero-power experiments to measure rod worth and reactivity coefficients, the reactor was shut down and final preparations made for power operation. Power ascension was delayed when vapors from oil that had leaked into the fuel pump were polymerized by the radioactive offgas and plugged gas filters and valves. Maximum power, which was limited to 7.4 MW_{th} by the capability of the heat-rejection system, was reached in May 1966.

After two months of high-power operation, the reactor was down for three months because of the failure of one of the main cooling blowers. Some further delays were encountered because of offgas line plugging, but by the end of 1966 most of the startup problems were behind. During the next 15 months, the reactor was critical 80% of the time, with runs of 1, 3, and 6 months that were uninterrupted by a fuel drain. By March 1968, the original objectives of the MSRE had been accomplished, and nuclear operation with ^{235}U was concluded.

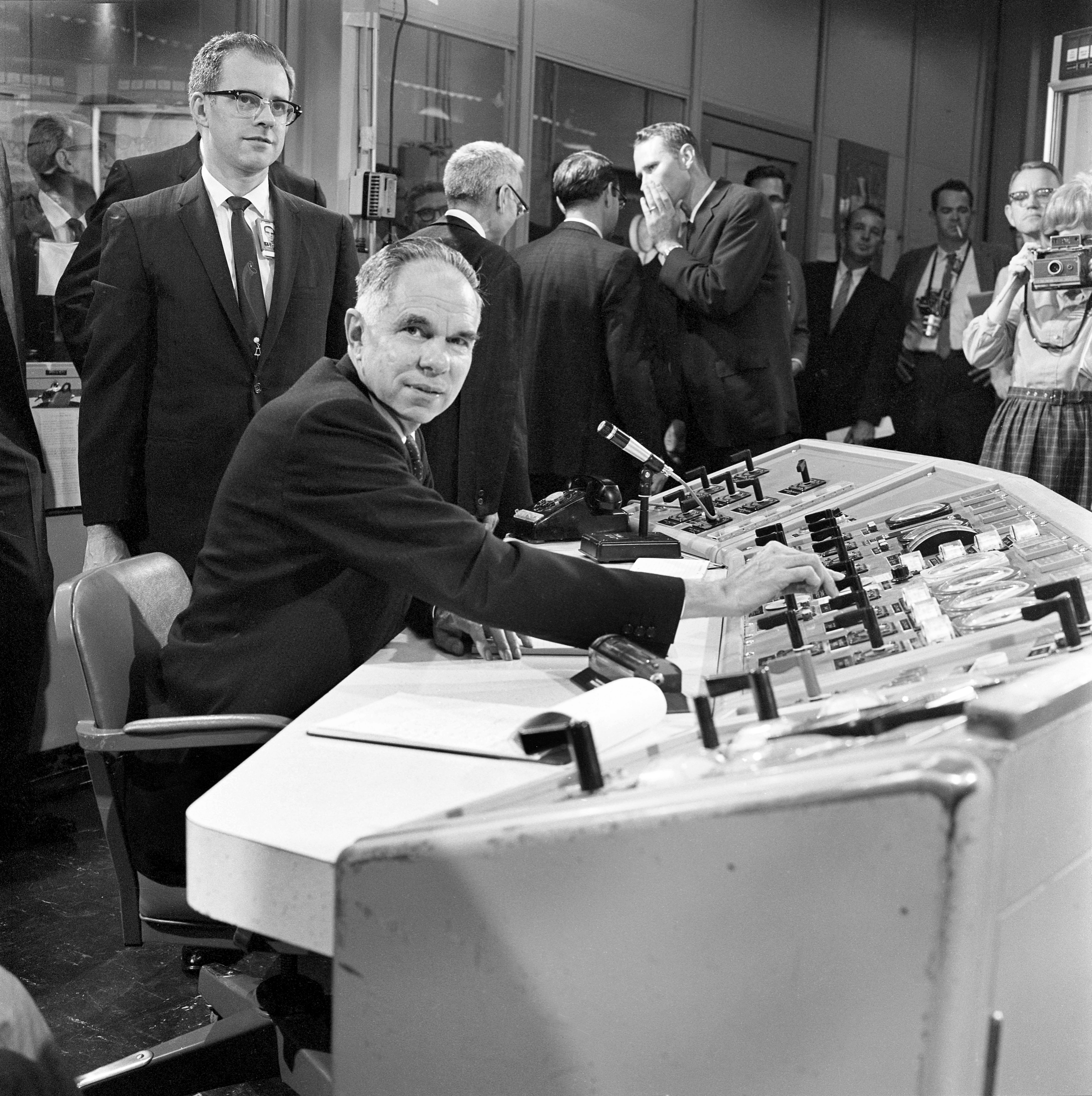
AEC Chairman Seaborg at the MSRE controls in 1968 for startup with U-233.

By this time, ample ^{233}U had become available, so the MSRE program was extended to include substitution of ^{233}U for the uranium in the fuel salt, and operation to observe the new nuclear characteristics. Using the on-site processing equipment the flush salt and fuel salt were fluorinated to recover the uranium in them as UF_{6}. ^{233}UF_{4}-LiF eutectic was then added to the carrier salt, and in October 1968, the MSRE became the world's first reactor to operate on ^{233}U.

The ^{233}U zero-power experiments and dynamics tests confirmed the predicted neutronic characteristics. An unexpected consequence of processing the salt was that its physical properties were altered slightly so that more than the usual amount of gas was entrained from the fuel pump into the circulating loop. The circulating gas and the power fluctuations that accompanied it were eliminated by operating the fuel pump at slightly lower speed. Operation at high power for several months permitted accurate measurement of the capture-to-fission ratio, for ^{233}U in this reactor, completing the objectives of the ^{233}U operation.

In the concluding months of operation, xenon stripping, deposition of fission products, and tritium behavior were investigated. The feasibility of using plutonium in molten-salt reactors was emphasized by adding PuF_{3} as makeup fuel during this period.

After the final shutdown in December 1969, the reactor was left in standby for nearly a year. A limited examination program was then carried out, including a moderator bar from the core, a control rod thimble, heat exchanger tubes, parts from the fuel pump bowl, and a freeze valve that had developed a leak during the final reactor shutdown. The radioactive systems were then closed to await ultimate disposal.

=== Statistics ===
Parameters and operational statistics:

Power: 8 MW (thermal)
output: 92.8 GWh
equivalent full-power: 11,555 h

Fuel salt: fluoride
cations: 65% Li-7, 29.1% Be, 5% Zr, 0.9% U
weight: 11,260 lbs (5,107 kg)
melting temp: 813 F (434 C)
inlet temp: 1175 F (635 C)
outlet temp: 1225 F (663 C)
flow rate: 400 gal/min (1514 l/min)
fuel pump circulating: 19,405 h

Coolant salt: fluoride
cations: 66% Li-7, 34% Be
weight: 15,300 lbs (6,940 kg)
coolant pump circulating: 23,566 h

Moderator: nuclear graphite

Container: Hastelloy-N

First fuel: U-235
first critical: 1 June 1965
thermal output: 72,441 MWh
critical hours: 11,515 h
full-power output equivalent: 9,006 h

Second fuel: U-233
critical: 2 October 1968
thermal output: 20,363 MWh
critical hours: 3,910 h
full-power output equivalent: 2,549 h

Shutdown: December 1969

== Results ==
The broadest and perhaps most important conclusion from the MSRE experience was that a molten salt fueled reactor concept was viable. It ran for considerable periods of time, yielding valuable information, and maintenance was accomplished safely and without excessive delay.

The MSRE confirmed expectations and predictions. For example, it was demonstrated that: the fuel salt was immune to radiation damage, the graphite was not attacked by the fuel salt, and the corrosion of Hastelloy-N was negligible. Noble gases were stripped from the fuel salt by a spray system, reducing the ^{135}Xe poisoning by a factor of about 6. The bulk of the fission product elements remained stable in the salt. Additions of uranium and plutonium to the salt during operation were quick and uneventful, and recovery of uranium by fluorination was efficient. The neutronics, including critical loading, reactivity coefficients, dynamics, and long-term reactivity changes, agreed with prior calculations.

In other areas, the operation resulted in improved data or reduced uncertainties. The ^{233}U capture-to-fission ratio in a typical MSR neutron spectrum is an example of basic data that was improved. The effect of fissioning on the redox potential of the fuel salt was resolved. The deposition of some elements ("noble metals") was expected, but the MSRE provided quantitative data on relative deposition on graphite, metal, and liquid-gas interfaces. Heat transfer coefficients measured in the MSRE agreed with conventional design calculations and did not change over the life of the reactor. Limiting oxygen in the salt proved effective, and the tendency of fission products to be dispersed from contaminated equipment during maintenance was low.

Operation of the MSRE provided insights into the problem of tritium in a molten-salt reactor. It was observed that about 6–10% of the calculated 54 Ci/day (2.0 TBq) production diffused out of the fuel system into the containment cell atmosphere and another 6–10% reached the air through the heat removal system. The fact that these fractions were not higher, indicated that something partially negated the transfer of tritium through hot metals.

One unexpected finding was inter-granular cracking in all metal surfaces exposed to the fuel salt. The cause of the embrittlement was tellurium, a fission product generated in the fuel. This was first noted in the specimens that were removed from the core at intervals during the reactor operation. Post-operation examination of pieces of a control-rod thimble, heat-exchanger tubes and pump bowl parts revealed the ubiquity of the cracking and emphasized its importance to the MSR concept. The crack growth was rapid enough to become a problem over the planned 30-year life of a follow-on thorium breeder reactor. This cracking could in short-term be reduced by adding small amounts of niobium to the Hastelloy-N. However, further studies were needed to assess the effects of longer exposure times and some interaction parameters for the used mixtures.

The operation experience gained with the MSRE showed that the following areas require further investigation for the successful operation of a commercial MSR:

- Maintaining the salt as a liquid in all parts of primary system, particularly in extremities far from the core.
- Tight control of tritium production and transport from the core (only <20% could be removed due to diffusion and heat removal system in the MSRE).
- Reduction in growth of inter-granular cracks in exposed metal surfaces (due to tellurium, a fission product of uranium).
- Decommissioning and disposal of the reactor structure and waste salt (approx. costs in 2019 are $10mil/yr).

== Decommissioning ==
After shutdown, the salt was believed to be in long-term safe storage. At low temperatures, radiolysis can free fluorine from the salt. As a countermeasure, the salt was annually reheated to about 302 °F (150 °C) until 1989. But beginning in the mid-1980s, there was concern that radioactivity was migrating through the system, reported by an ORNL employee who was among 125 people working above the reactor, which had not been decontaminated or decommissioned. Department of Energy Oak Ridge Operations Manager Joe Ben LaGrone ordered evacuation of 125 employees, based on findings reported to him inspector William Dan DeFord, P.E.

Sampling in 1994 revealed concentrations of uranium that created a potential for a nuclear criticality accident, as well as a potentially dangerous build-up of fluorine gas: the environment above the solidified salt was approximately one atmosphere of fluorine. The ensuing decontamination and decommissioning project was called "the most technically challenging" activity assigned to Bechtel Jacobs under its environmental management contract with the U.S. Department of Energy's Oak Ridge Operations organization.

In 2003, decommissioning was expected to be completed in 2009, and the MSRE cleanup project cost estimated at $130 million. Removal of uranium from the salt was completed in March 2008, however still leaving the salt with the fission products in the tanks. Much of the high cost was caused by the unpleasant surprise of fluorine and uranium hexafluoride evolution from cold fuel salt in storage that ORNL did not defuel and store correctly, but this has now been taken into consideration in MSR design.

A potential decommissioning process has been described; uranium is to be removed from the fuel as the hexafluoride by adding excess fluorine, and plutonium as the plutonium dioxide by adding sodium carbonate.

As of 2019, the MSRE is in a SAFESTOR state, meaning it is still intact but shut down and actively monitored and maintained.

== See also ==
- Thorium fuel cycle
- Fuji MSR
- Thorium-based nuclear power
