= Thorium Energy Alliance =

U.S. non-profit organization

- Formation: 2009 Washington, D.C., United States
- Type: Non-governmental organization
- Purpose: Educational, Sustainable Energy
- Headquarters: Harvard, Illinois
- Region served: Worldwide
- Executive Director: John Kutsch
- Website: thoriumenergyalliance.com

The Thorium Energy Alliance (TEA) is a 501(c)(3) non-profit organization based in the United States which promotes the use of thorium in nuclear power. The potential for thorium-based nuclear power was studied extensively during the 1950s and 1960s, and experienced a worldwide revival of interest in the early 2010s due to concerns regarding safety, economics, and availability of other energy sources. The TEA advocates for the use of thorium both in existing nuclear reactors and in next generation reactors. It promotes initiatives to educate scientists, government officials, and the general public.

== Energy crisis and the role of thorium ==
Present-generation nuclear reactors are uranium-based and are fueled by either freshly mined uranium or recycled plutonium and uranium as the fissile material. There are concerns about a continued supply of uranium, due to resource depletion, as well as various obstacles to mining uranium deposits. Moreover, the current generation of nuclear reactors harness less than 3% of the energy content of uranium fuel. This technology, in turn, leaves large quantities of radioactive waste to be disposed of. Some believe the issue of waste storage is a negative for this energy source. A vast majority of the present generation reactors are based on the original design of reactors meant to power submarines, and whose safety is ensured by several active features and standard operating practices. Under various circumstances, these features and procedures were seen to fail, potentially bringing about catastrophic consequences. An additional concern for this type of reactor regards the proliferation of nuclear weapons; the enrichment equipment necessary for preparing fuel for nuclear reactors can be repurposed to create feed-stock for nuclear weapons.

Thorium has been proposed as a clean, safe, proliferation-resistant and sustainable source of energy, freeing it from most of the issues associated with uranium. The average crustal abundance of thorium is four times more than that of uranium. Thorium is invariably associated with rare-earth elements or rare metals like niobium, tantalum and zirconium. Hence, it can be recovered as a by-product of other mining activities. Already, large quantities of thorium recovered from rare-earth element operations have been stockpiled in many countries. Thorium is a fertile material, and essentially all thorium can be used in a nuclear reactor. Thorium is not fissile in itself, it absorbs a neutron to transmute into uranium-233, which can then fission to produce energy. Therefore, a thorium-based fuel cycle produces relatively little, easily manageable waste compared to uranium-based fuel cycles. Thorium based fuel cycle options can be used to 'burn' all the presently accumulated nuclear waste. Various thorium-based reactor designs are inherently safer than uranium-based reactors. Nuclear proliferation using thorium has proven to be extremely difficult and non-practical, although proof-of-concepts for this have been reported.

Despite its use in commercial reactors in the past, interest in thorium diminished in the late 1980s. Critics of thorium claim that the advantages are overstated and it is unlikely to be a useful source of energy. Experts point to adverse economics and the availability of plentiful alternative energy sources as factors that may deter the full commercialization of thorium-based energy. These and other issues regarding the use of thorium have been debated.

== Objectives ==
The Thorium Energy Alliance's stated mission is "educating the world on the uses and advantages of Thorium as a Fuel for nuclear power and as a critical material derived from the rare earth metals refining process for free". The TEA states that its objectives include restarting American research into homogeneous nuclear fuels and commercialization of the molten-salt reactor, establishing a cooperative for the refining of thorium-bearing rare-earth metals, and "supporting the reemergence of a Western Rare Earths infrastructure".

One of the major objectives of the TEA is its advocacy for use of thorium as a nuclear fuel, particularly in molten-salt reactors. It has emphasized the research and development conducted in the United States during the 1950s to 1970s on thorium based reactor designs and fuel cycle options including the Molten-Salt Reactor Experiment (MSRE) carried out at Oak Ridge National Laboratory, in the United States during 1964–1969.

== Activities ==
The TEA creates educational resources and textbooks, facilitates speaking events, and engages the public on social media. It maintains a website hosting resources including historical documentation and applications of thorium, conference materials, and related technical papers. It has worked with rare-earth organizations and the Critical Minerals Institute to provide thorium policy guidance relating to critical materials supply in the United States.

The Thorium Energy Alliance has supported research projects at the Nanotechnology Lab at the University of Missouri–St. Louis (UMSL), and has conducted outreach through STEM organizations including Generation Atomic, North American Young Generation in Nuclear, and Mothers for Nuclear. On October 14, 2022, the TEA opened an exhibit on thorium energy at the National Museum of Nuclear Science & History in Albuquerque, New Mexico.

The TEA has argued for the use of the thorium-fueled molten salt reactor in place of light-water reactors. It has argued in support of thorium-fueled MSRs in public hearings, such as the Blue Ribbon Commission on America's Nuclear Future.

In March 2023, the Government of El Salvador and the Thorium Energy Alliance signed a Memorandum of Understanding to promote the "El Salvador Energy Bridge" plan for clean energy through thorium. The document was signed by Daniel Álvarez, Director General of Energy, Hydrocarbons and Mines, and John Kutsch, the TEA's executive director, at the Embassy of El Salvador in Washington, D.C., with Salvadoran Ambassador Milena Mayorga as witness.

== Annual conferences ==
TEA has organized annual conferences since 2009, where scientific sessions and cross-cutting energy and fuel management discussions have brought together a cross-section of experts. The inaugural conference in 2009 took place in Washington, D.C., followed by California (2010), Washington, D.C. (2011), and Chicago, Illinois (2012 and 2013). The tenth conference, TEAC10, was held at the Pollard Technology Conference Center in Oak Ridge, Tennessee, on October 1, 2019.

The eleventh conference, TEAC11, was held in 2022 in Albuquerque, New Mexico, at the National Museum of Nuclear Science & History. The conference occurred with participation of the University of New Mexico, Abilene Christian University Nuclear Department, the museum, and the support of several of the startups that TEA has assisted with technological support and policy information.

== See also ==
- Alvin M. Weinberg
- The Alvin Weinberg Foundation
- Nuclear power debate
