= Neutron economy =

Measure of the efficiency of a nuclear fission reaction

Neutron economy is a measure of how efficiently a nuclear reactor uses the neutrons produced in fission to sustain a chain reaction. On average, a fission event releases about 2.5 neutrons, and a self-sustaining chain reaction needs at least one of them to trigger a further fission. The neutron economy of a reactor design is therefore a question of keeping neutron production balanced against neutron loss from absorption and leakage. That balance is expressed by the neutron multiplication factor, the ratio of the neutrons produced by fission in one generation to the number of neutrons produced in the preceding generation; the reactor is critical, with a constant neutron population, when that factor equals one.

Nuclear fission is a process in which the nuclei of atoms are split apart. Among the various particles released in this process are high-energy neutrons with energies spread over the neutron spectrum. Those neutrons may cause other nuclei to undergo fission, leading to the possibility of a chain reaction. However, the neutrons can only cause another fission under certain conditions based on their energy; high-energy, or "relativistic", neutrons will often fly right through another nucleus without causing fission. The chance that a neutron will be captured increases greatly when its energy is about that of the target nucleus, which is known as a "thermal neutron". In order to maintain a chain reaction in a nuclear reactor, a neutron moderator is used to slow the neutrons down. This moderator is often used as the coolant that is used for energy extraction as well, and the most common moderator is water. The neutrons also slow due to elastic and inelastic collisions with fuel and other materials in the reactor.

A fission reactor is based on the idea of maintaining criticality, where every fission event leads to another fission event, no more and no less. As fission of uranium releases two or three neutrons, this means some of the neutrons must be removed as part of the overall process. Some will be lost purely due to geometry, those released travelling outward from the outer edge of the fuel mass will not have a chance to cause fission, for instance. Others will be absorbed through various processes in the mass, and still others will be deliberately absorbed by control rods or similar devices to maintain the correct overall balance. The process of moderating the neutrons almost always leads to some of them being absorbed as well.

== Multiplication factors ==
The neutron economy of a reactor is summarized by the neutron multiplication factor, the ratio of the neutrons produced by fission in one generation to the number of neutrons produced in the preceding generation. For an idealized infinitely large reactor, in which no neutrons leak out of the core, this is the infinite multiplication factor $k_\infty$. In a thermal reactor it can be decomposed into four factors:

$$k_\infty = \varepsilon p f \eta$$

where $\varepsilon$ is the fast fission factor, the ratio of fast neutrons produced by all fissions to those produced by thermal fissions; $p$ is the resonance escape probability, the ratio of the neutrons that reach thermal energy to the fast neutrons that start to slow down; $f$ is the thermal utilization factor, the ratio of thermal neutrons absorbed in the fuel to the thermal neutrons absorbed in all the reactor materials; and $\eta$ is the reproduction factor, the ratio of the fast neutrons produced by thermal fission to the thermal neutrons absorbed in the fuel.

In a real reactor of finite size, some neutrons leak out of the core before they can cause fission. The effective multiplication factor $k_\text{eff}$ accounts for these losses, giving the six-factor formula:

$$k_\text{eff} = \varepsilon p f \eta P_\text{FNL} P_\text{TNL}$$

where $P_\text{FNL}$ and $P_\text{TNL}$ are the fast and thermal non-leakage probabilities. A reactor is critical when $k_\text{eff} = 1$, supercritical when $k_\text{eff} > 1$, and subcritical when $k_\text{eff} < 1$.

The quantity that indicates how much the neutron economy is out of balance is given the term reactivity. If a reactor is exactly critical—that is, the neutron production is exactly equal to neutron destruction—the reactivity is zero. If the reactivity is positive, the reactor is supercritical. If the reactivity is negative, the reactor is subcritical. The term "neutron economy" is used not just for the instantaneous reactivity of a reactor, but also to describe the overall efficiency of a nuclear reactor design. Common reactor designs using conventional water as the coolant and moderator generally have poor relative neutron economies because the water will absorb some of the thermal neutrons, reducing the number available to keep the reaction going. In contrast, heavy water captures far fewer neutrons while moderating than light water does, which gives a better neutron economy and lets such reactors operate on natural uranium without enrichment; CANDU reactors use heavy water as their moderator. Reactors with high neutron economies have more "leftover neutrons" which can be used for other purposes, like breeding additional fuel (in a breeder reactor the amount of fissionable fuel produced is greater than the amount consumed) or transmuting the radioactive components of nuclear waste, such as the minor actinides in spent fuel, which is more efficient in fast reactors.

== See also ==
- Dollar (reactivity)
- Breeder reactor
