= Closed-cycle gas turbine =

Gas turbine using a working fluid in a closed loop

Closed-cycle gas turbine schematic C compressor and T turbine assembly w high-temperature heat exchanger ʍ low-temperature heat exchanger ~ mechanical load, e.g. electric generator

A closed-cycle gas turbine is a turbine that uses a gas (e.g. air, nitrogen, helium, argon, etc.) for the working fluid as part of a closed thermodynamic system. Heat is supplied from an external source. Such recirculating turbines follow the Brayton cycle.

== Background ==
The initial patent for a closed-cycle gas turbine (CCGT) was issued in 1935 and they were first used commercially in 1939. Seven CCGT units were built in Switzerland and Germany by 1978. Historically, CCGTs found most use as external combustion engines "with fuels such as bituminous coal, brown coal and blast furnace gas" but were superseded by open cycle gas turbines using cleaner-burning fuels (e.g. "gas or light oil"), especially in highly efficient combined cycle systems. Air-based CCGT systems have demonstrated very high availability and reliability. The most notable helium-based system thus far was Oberhausen 2, a 50 megawatt cogeneration plant that operated from 1975 to 1987 in Germany. Compared to Europe where the technology was originally developed, CCGT is not well known in the US.

== Nuclear power ==
Gas-cooled reactors powering helium-based closed-cycle gas turbines were suggested in 1945. The experimental ML-1 nuclear reactor in the early-1960s used a nitrogen-based CCGT operating at 0.9 MPa. The cancelled pebble bed modular reactor was intended to be coupled with a helium CCGT. Future nuclear (Generation IV reactors) may employ CCGT for power generation, e.g. Flibe Energy intends to produce a liquid fluoride thorium reactor coupled with a CCGT.

== Development ==
Closed-cycle gas turbines hold promise for use with future high temperature solar power and fusion power generation.

They have also been proposed as a technology for use in long-term space exploration.

Supercritical carbon dioxide closed-cycle gas turbines are under development; "The main advantage of the supercritical CO_{2} cycle is comparable efficiency with the helium Brayton cycle at significantly lower temperature" (550 °C vs. 850 °C), but with the disadvantage of higher pressure (20 MPa vs. 8 MPa). Sandia National Laboratories had a goal of developing a 10 MWe supercritical CO_{2} demonstration CCGT by 2019.

== See also ==
- Aircraft Nuclear Propulsion
- Stirling engine
