= Fertile material =

Substance that can be converted into material for use in nuclear fission

Transmutation flow between ^{238}U and ^{245}Cm in LWR. Speed of transmutation varies greatly by nuclide, and percentages are relative to total transmutation and decay. After removal of fuel from reactor, decay will predominate for shorter-lived isotopes such as ^{238}Pu, ^{241}Pu, ^{242–244}Cm; but ^{245–248}Cm are all long-lived.

Fertile material is a material that, although not fissile itself, can be converted into a fissile material by neutron absorption.

== Naturally occurring fertile materials ==
Naturally occurring fertile materials that can be converted into a fissile material by irradiation in a reactor include:

- thorium-232 which converts into uranium-233
- uranium-234 which converts into uranium-235
- uranium-238 which converts into plutonium-239

Artificial isotopes formed in the reactor which can be converted into fissile material by one neutron capture include:

- plutonium-238 which converts into plutonium-239
- plutonium-240 which converts into plutonium-241

Some higher actinides require multiple successive neutron captures—interspersed with radioactive decay—before yielding a nuclide that is both fissile and sufficiently long-lived to undergo fission. Because neutron capture (n, γ) increases the mass number (Α) without changing the atomic number (Z), the nucleus must undergo β decay to convert excess neutrons into protons and climb to a higher element. Examples include

- plutonium-242 to americium-243 to curium-244 to curium-245
- uranium-236 to neptunium-237 to plutonium-238 to plutonium-239
- americium-241 to curium-242 to curium-243 (or, more likely, curium-242 decays to plutonium-238, which also requires one additional neutron to reach a fissile nuclide)

Since these require a total of 3 or 4 thermal neutrons to eventually fission, and a thermal neutron fission generates only about 2 to 3 neutrons, these nuclides represent a net loss of neutrons. A subcritical reactor operating in the thermal neutron spectrum would have to adjust the strength of the external neutron source in accordance with the build-up or consumption of such materials. In a fast reactor, those nuclides may require fewer neutrons to achieve fission, as well as producing more neutrons when they do fission. However, there is also the chance of (n,2n) or even (n,3n) "knockout" reactions (an incident fast neutron hits a nucleus and more than one neutron leaves) with fast neutrons which are not possible with thermal neutrons.

== Fissile materials from fertile materials ==
A fast-neutron reactor, meaning one with little or no neutron moderator and hence utilising fast neutrons, can be configured as a breeder reactor, producing more fissile material than it consumes, using fertile material in a blanket around the core, or contained in special fuel rods. Since plutonium-238, plutonium-240 and plutonium-242 are fertile, accumulation of these and other nonfissile isotopes is less of a problem than in thermal reactors, which cannot burn them efficiently. Breeder reactors using thermal-spectrum neutrons are only practical if the thorium fuel cycle is used, as uranium-233 fissions far more reliably with thermal neutrons than plutonium-239. A subcritical reactor —regardless of neutron spectrum— can also "breed" fissile nuclides from fertile material, allowing in principle the consumption of very low grade actinides (e.g. Spent MOX fuel whose plutonium-240 content is too high for use in current critical thermal reactors) without the need for highly enriched material as used in a fast breeder reactor.

== Applications ==
Proposed applications for fertile material includes a space-based facility for the manufacture of fissile material for spacecraft nuclear propulsion. The facility would notionally transport fertile materials from Earth, safely through the atmosphere, and locate them at a space facility at the Earth–Moon L1 Lagrangian point where manufacture of fissile material would occur, eliminating the safety risk of transport of fissile materials from Earth. While uranium and thorium are present on the moon, they seem to be in more limited supply than on earth, especially near the surface. If in situ resource utilization is desired to fuel nuclear power plants on the moon, converting fertile material to fissile material could be a way to make the resources last longer and to reduce the need for uranium enrichment which requires the chemically aggressive volatile fluorine to prepare uranium hexafluoride as used in the current enrichment technology.
