= Molten Salt Demonstration Reactor =

Experimental nuclear reactor

The Molten-Salt Demonstration Reactor (MSDR) was a semi-commercial-scale experimental molten salt reactor (MSR) design developed at Oak Ridge National Laboratory (ORNL).

Due to the success of both the Aircraft Reactor Experiment (ARE) and Molten Salt Reactor Experiment (MSRE), ORNL went on to design a MSDR and a Molten Salt Breeder Reactor (MSBR). The MSDR is a 750 MW_{th} MSR design that uses LiF-BeF_{2}-ThF_{4}-UF_{4} (71.5-16.0-12.0-0.5 mole %) as the primary fuel salt. The secondary coolant salt is FLiBe (2LiF-BeF_{2}) (66-34 mol%). "The original goal of the MSDR design was to demonstrate the MSR concept on a semicommercial scale while maximizing development of basic technology beyond that already demonstrated by the MSRE."

== Reactor Design ==
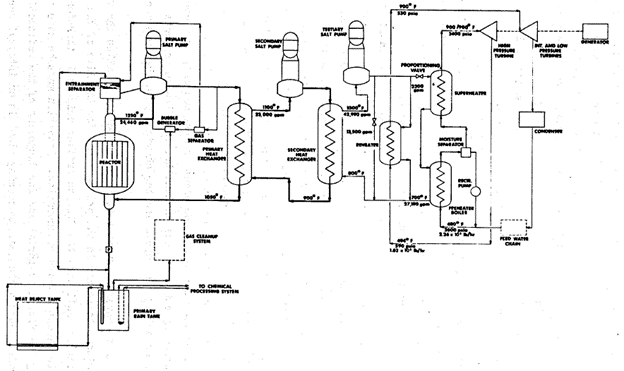
Flow chart of the entire MSDR design model

The MSDR design has a Primary Fuel Loop, Primary Coolant Loop, and Balance of Plant.

Design Parameters for MSDR
Property	Value	Units
Thermal Power Rating	750	MW
Operating Pressure	0.1	MPa
Primary Hot/Cold Leg Temperature	677/566	°C
Secondary Hot/Cold Leg Temperature	593/482	°C
Primary total mass flow rate	5000	kg/s
Secondary total mass flow rate	2800	kg/s

=== Primary Fuel Loop ===
The fuel salt circulates from the reactor to the primary fuel pump, then the Primary Heat Exchanger (PHX), where it then flows back into the reactor. The primary fuel loop is a forced flow loop system. The components that are part of the primary fuel loop are the reactor, PHXs, pump bowl, pump, and hot and cold leg piping. The MSDR has three heat exchanger loops. Each of these loops has one pump and two heat exchangers in parallel. Graphite reflectors are used in the core, both radial and axial reflectors. The pumps have a capacity of 8,100 gpm and are centrifugal pumps. The PHXs in the primary fuel loop reject heat to the primary coolant loop and are shell-and-tube heat exchangers. The PHXs are constructed of a nickel based alloy, Hastelloy N, and each has a rate of heat transfer equal to 125 MW. The primary fuel salt for the MSDR is LiF-BeF_{2}-ThF_{4}-UF_{4} (71.5-16.0-12.0-0.5 mole %).

MSDR fuel salt nominal values from Bettis
Property	Nominal Value	Units
Density	236.3-0.0233×T(°F)	lb/ft^{3}
Viscosity	0.2637×exp(7362/(459.7+T(°F)))	lb/hr·ft
Thermal Conductivity	0.75	Btu/hr·ft·(°F)
Specific Heat Capacity	0.32	Btu/lb·(°F)

Thermophysical Properties of Hastelloy-N (Temperatures in Kelvin)
Property	Nominal Value	Units
Density	8,860	kg/m^{3}
Thermal Conductivity	9.77-(3.2e^{−4}×T)+(1.46e^{−5}×T^{2})	W/m^{2}·K
Specific Heat Capacity	489-(0.34e-4×T)+(4.6e^{−4}×T^{2})	J/kg·K

Thermophysical Properties of Graphite (Temperatures in Kelvin)
Property	Nominal Value	Units
Density	1776.66	kg/m^{3}
Thermal Conductivity	169-(0.125×T)+(3.28e^{−5}×T^{2})	W/m^{2}·K
Specific Heat Capacity	-144-(3.67×T)+(2.2e^{−3}×T^{2})+(4.63e^{−7}×T^{3})	J/kg·K

==== PHX ====
The PHXs are shell-and-tube type heat exchangers. The tube-side of the PHX has the hot fluid, which is the fuel salt flowing through it with an PHX inlet temperature of 1250°F and a PHX outlet temperature of 1050°F. The pressure drop across the heat exchanger is 127 psi, and the mass flow rate is 6.6 million lb/hr.

The shell-side has the coolant salt as the cold fluid. The coolant has an inlet temperature of 900°F and an outlet temperature of 1100 °F. The pressure drop across the heat exchanger is 115 psi, and the mass flow rate on the shell-side is 3.7 million lb/hr.

The tube, shell, and tubesheet material is Hastelloy N. The total heat transfer areas based on the outside of the tubes is 4024 ft^{2}. The volume of the fuel salt within the tubes is 20.8 ft^{3}. There are 47 baffles of type disk and doughnut. The overall heat transfer coefficient (U) is equal to 700 Btu/hr·ft^{2}.

=== Primary Coolant Loop ===
The primary coolant loop includes the coolant pump, the shell side of the PHX, and the tube side of the secondary heat exchanger. There are three total primary coolant loops to correspond to the three primary fuel loops. All the secondary heat exchangers reject heat to the balance of plant. The secondary salt was LiF-BeF_{2} (66–34 mole %).

MSDR FLiBe coolant salt nominal values from Bettis
Property	Nominal Value	Units
Density	138.68-0.01456×T(°F)	lb/ft^{3}
Viscosity	0.2806×exp(6759/(459.7+T(°F)))	lb/hr·ft
Thermal Conductivity	0.58	Btu/hr·ft·(°F)
Specific Heat Capacity	0.57	Btu/lb·(°F)

=== Secondary Coolant Loop/Power Cycle ===
The proposed design uses a secondary coolant loop that has nitrate-nitrate salt as the working fluid. The nitrate salt is KNO_{3}-NaNO_{2}-NaNO_{3} (44-49-7 mole %). A supercritical steam Rankine cycle is the selected power cycle. The water has a temperature of 1050°F(838.71 K) when it leaves the secondary heat exchanger, and it has a pressure of 3500 psa (24132 kPa).

MSDR Nitrate-Nitrate coolant salt nominal values from Bettis
Property	Nominal Value	Units
Density	130.6-0.0254×T(°F)	lb/ft^{3}
Viscosity	0.1942×exp(3821.6/(459.7+T(°F)))	lb/hr·ft
Thermal Conductivity	0.33	Btu/hr·ft·(°F)
Specific Heat Capacity	0.37	Btu/lb·(°F)

== See also ==
- Thorium fuel cycle
- Nuclear power plant
- Liquid fluoride thorium reactor
- Fuji Molten Salt Reactor
- Thorium-based nuclear power
