= Molten-salt reactor =

Type of nuclear reactor cooled by molten salt

Example of a molten-salt reactor scheme

A molten-salt reactor (MSR) is a class of nuclear fission reactor in which the primary nuclear reactor coolant and/or the fuel is a mixture of molten salt with a fissile material. Only some small molten-salt test reactors have been built. As of 2026, no commercial MSR exists.

MSRs can be grouped by the role the salt plays. In salt-fuelled designs, the fuel is dissolved in the salt. In the Molten-Salt Reactor Experiment, the salt functioned as both fuel and coolant combined, and circulated through the core and out to pumps and heat exchangers. In the stable salt reactor, the fuel salt stays inside fixed fuel pins. In salt-cooled designs such as the fluoride salt-cooled high-temperature reactor (FHR), solid fuel is cooled by molten salt. Using salt as fuel and as coolant are separate choices: the dual fluid reactor, for example, uses salt fuel with a metal coolant. MSRs can use fast or moderated (thermal) neutrons, and can burn fuel or breed it. MSRs are distinguished from the similar liquid metal cooled reactor, which may use sodium metal coolant (as opposed to a sodium salt).

The choice of salt affects how safe and practical a reactor is. Most research has used fluoride salts, because fluorine rarely becomes radioactive, absorbs few neutrons and slows neutrons well. Fluoride salts also do not form flammable hydrogen. The most studied mixture is FLiBe, made from lithium and beryllium fluorides. Chloride salts would allow fast breeder reactors but have been studied much less. Lithium must be purified to lithium-7 to limit tritium production, and beryllium is toxic, so designs must stop it escaping. Salts are usually mixed so that they melt at a lower temperature, which makes startup easier.

MSRs are designed with several safety and efficiency advantages. Because the fuel is already molten, they avoid the meltdown and hydrogen gas explosion risk of water-cooled reactors. In an emergency, the fuel can drain into a separate tank, where it cools and solidifies, stopping the reaction. MSRs run at near-normal air pressure, so they need less costly pressure vessels. They also run much hotter than light-water reactors, about 700 °C compared with about 300 °C. This makes them more efficient and lets them supply heat for industry.

However, MSRs face several challenges. Hot salts are highly corrosive. In designs where the fuel circulates, radioactive material touches pumps and heat exchangers, so repairs may need to be done by remote control. Some designs also need on-site chemical processing, which has been shown only at laboratory scale.

Two research MSRs operated in the United States in the mid-20th century. The 1950s Aircraft Reactor Experiment (ARE) was primarily motivated by the technology's compact size, while the 1960s Molten-Salt Reactor Experiment (MSRE) aimed to demonstrate a nuclear power plant using a thorium fuel cycle in a breeder reactor. Increased research into Generation IV reactor designs renewed interest in the 21st century with multiple nations starting projects. In 2023, China's 2 MW_{t} testreactor TMSR-LF1 reached criticality and achieved full power for 10 days in October 2024.

== Properties ==
Fundamentally, all MSRs involve the use of a molten salt (not necessarily table salt) in their core. MSRs may be divided into two further categories: those with fissile or fertile material dissolved in the salt, and those that merely use the salt to cool more traditional fuel assemblies or a pebble bed. The nuclear reaction heats the salt to very high temperatures. The temperature is then exchanged to one or more secondary coolant loops, which can be used for power generation or in chemical processes requiring very high heat.

MSRs with fuel carrying salt eliminate the nuclear meltdown scenario present in water-cooled reactors because the fuel mixture is kept in a molten state. The fuel mixture is designed to drain without pumping from the core to a containment vessel in emergency scenarios, where the fuel solidifies, quenching the reaction. In addition, hydrogen evolution does not occur. That eliminates the risk of hydrogen explosions (as in the Fukushima nuclear disaster). They operate at or close to atmospheric pressure, rather than the 75–150 times atmospheric pressure of a typical light-water reactor (LWR). This reduces the need and cost for reactor pressure vessels. The gaseous fission products (Xe and Kr) have little solubility in the fuel salt, (Note: "Fission products (except Xe and Kr) and nuclear materials are highly soluble in the salt and will remain in the salt under both operating and expected accident conditions. The fission products that are not soluble (e.g. Xe, Kr) are continuously removed from the molten fuel salt, solidified, packaged, and placed in passively cooled storage vaults".—Dr. Charles W. Forsberg.) and can be safely captured as they bubble out of the fuel, (Note: The TMSR-500, a liquid fluoride thorium reactor operates at a pressure of 3 atmospheres and temperatures of 550 to 700 °C. In this design, the gaseous fission byproducts Xe and Kr are separated by helium sparge into holding tanks, where their radioactivity has decayed, after about a week. The helium is recycled.) rather than increasing the pressure inside the fuel tubes, as happens in conventional reactors. Xenon capture also eliminates the Xenon hole problem.

MSRs can be refueled while operating (essentially inline-nuclear reprocessing) while conventional reactors shut down for refueling (notable exceptions include pressure tube reactors like the heavy water CANDU or the Atucha-class PHWRs, light water cooled graphite moderated RBMK, and British-built gas-cooled reactors such as Magnox, AGR). MSR operating temperatures are around 700 °C (1,292 °F), significantly higher than traditional LWRs at around 300 °C (572 °F). This increases electricity-generation efficiency and process-heat opportunities.

Relevant design challenges include the corrosivity of hot salts and the changing chemical composition of the salt as it is transmuted by the neutron flux.

MSRs, especially those with fuel in the molten salt, offer lower operating pressures, and higher temperatures. In this respect an MSR is more similar to a liquid metal cooled reactor than to a conventional light water cooled reactor. MSR designs are often breeding reactors with a closed fuel cycle—as opposed to the once-through fuel currently used in conventional nuclear power generators.

MSRs exploit a negative temperature coefficient of reactivity and a large allowable temperature rise to prevent criticality accidents. For designs with the fuel in the salt, the salt thermally expands immediately with power excursions. In conventional reactors the negative reactivity is delayed since the heat from the fuel must be transferred to the moderator. An additional method is to place a separate, passively cooled container below the reactor. Fuel drains into the container during malfunctions or maintenance, which stops the reaction.

The temperatures of some designs are high enough to produce process heat, which led them to be included on the GEN-IV roadmap.

=== Advantages ===
MSRs offer many potential advantages over light water reactors.

For one, MSRs achieve passive decay heat removal. The molten coolant is not damaged by neutron bombardment (though the reactor vessel itself is).

MSRs can operate at low pressure, forgoing the need for expensive containment vessels, piping, and safety equipment. Because there is no explosive material in the reactor vessel such as water (which can explosively flash to steam, as in the Chernobyl disaster) or elemental sodium, the risk of reactor destruction is much lessened.

MSRs may enable cheaper closed nuclear fuel cycles, because they can operate with slow neutrons. Closed fuel cycles can reduce environmental impacts; chemical separation turns long-lived actinides into reactor fuel, and discharged wastes are mostly fission products with shorter half-lives. Additionally, the molten salt fuel's liquid phase can be pyroprocessed to separate fission products from the fuel element, which has advantages over conventional reprocessing. Also, MSRs do not require fuel rod fabrication.

Some MSR designs are compatible with fast neutrons, which "burn" transuranic elements such as ^{240}Pu and ^{241}Pu produced by standard reactors. This allows usage of a wider range of fuel elements in the reactor. MSRs also potentially have the neutron economy to exploit the neutron-poor thorium fuel cycle.

MSRs can run at high temperatures, yielding higher thermal efficiency than modern reactors. The size, expense, and environmental impact of the reactor is reduced as a result. Relatedly, MSRs can offer a high specific power (power per unit mass), as demonstrated by ARE.

=== Disadvantages ===
In circulating-fuel designs, radioactive material dissolved in the fuel salt contacts equipment such as pumps and heat exchangers directly. The potent radiation may require fully remote maintenance of these systems.

Some MSRs require on-site chemical processing to manage core mixture and remove fission products.

As MSRs are highly unconventional when compared to the more familiar light-water reactor designs in use today, regulatory changes to accommodate the non-traditional design features will be required. MSRE and ARE both used uranium approaching weapons-grade levels of enrichment; these levels would be illegal in most modern power plant regulatory regimes, and so modern designs employ lower-enriched fuels.

Some MSR designs rely on expensive nickel alloys to contain the molten salt. Such alloys are prone to embrittlement under high neutron flux.

Chief among these issues, MSRs are subject to high risk of corrosion. Molten salts are highly corrosive (unless they are purified) and require careful management of their oxidation state to mitigate the associated risks. This is particularly challenging for circulating designs, in which a mix of radioactive isotopes and their decay products circulate through the reactor. Static designs benefit from compartmentalizing the problem: the fuel salt is contained within fuel pins whose regular replacement, primarily due to neutron irradiation, is normalized; while the coolant salt has a simpler chemical composition and does not post a corrosion risk either to the fuel pins or to the reactor vessel. MSRs developed at ORNL in the 1960s were safe to operate only for a few years, and operated at only about 650 °C (1,202 °F). Corrosion risks include dissolution of chromium by liquid fluoride thorium salts at greater than 700 °C (1,292 °F), hence endangering stainless steel components. Neutron radiation can transmute common alloying agents (such as cobalt and nickel), shortening lifespan. Lithium salts such as FLiBe warrant the use of ^{7}Li to reduce tritium generation (tritium can permeate stainless steels, cause embrittlement, and escape into the environment). ORNL developed Hastelloy N to help address these issues, while other structural steels may be acceptable, such as 316H, 800H, and Inconel 617.

Some MSR designs can be converted into breeder reactors to produce weapons-grade nuclear material, posing a nuclear proliferation risk.

Core lifetime is limited by neutron damage to solid moderator materials. As an example, MSRE's graphite moderator was designed with loose tolerances, so neutron damage could change them without consequences. Dual-fluid MSR designs do not use graphite piping because graphite changes size when bombarded with neutrons. MSRs using fast neutrons cannot use graphite, because it moderates neutrons.

Thermal MSRs have lower breeding ratios than fast-neutron breeders, though their doubling time may be shorter.

== Coolant ==
MSRs can be cooled in various ways, including using molten salts.

Molten-salt-cooled solid-fuel reactors are variously called "molten-salt reactor system" in the Generation IV proposal, molten-salt converter reactors (MSCR), advanced high-temperature reactors (AHTRs), or fluoride high-temperature reactors (FHR, preferred DOE designation).

FHRs cannot reprocess fuel easily and have fuel rods that need to be fabricated and validated, requiring up to twenty years from project inception. FHR retains the safety and cost advantages of a low-pressure, high-temperature coolant, also shared by liquid metal cooled reactors. Notably, steam is not created in the core (as is present in boiling water reactors), and no large, expensive steel pressure vessel (as required for pressurized water reactors). Since it can operate at high temperatures, the conversion of the heat to electricity can use an efficient, lightweight Brayton cycle gas turbine.

Much of the current research on FHRs is focused on small, compact heat exchangers that reduce molten salt volumes and associated costs.

Molten salts can be highly corrosive and corrosivity increases with temperature. For the primary cooling loop, a material is needed that can withstand corrosion at high temperatures and intense radiation. Experiments show that Hastelloy-N and similar alloys are suited to these tasks at operating temperatures up to about 700 °C. However, operating experience is limited. Still higher operating temperatures are desirable—at 850 °C (1,560 °F) thermochemical production of hydrogen becomes possible. Materials for this temperature range have not been validated, though carbon composites, molybdenum alloys (e.g. TZM), carbides, and refractory metal based or ODS alloys might be feasible.

=== Fused salt selection ===
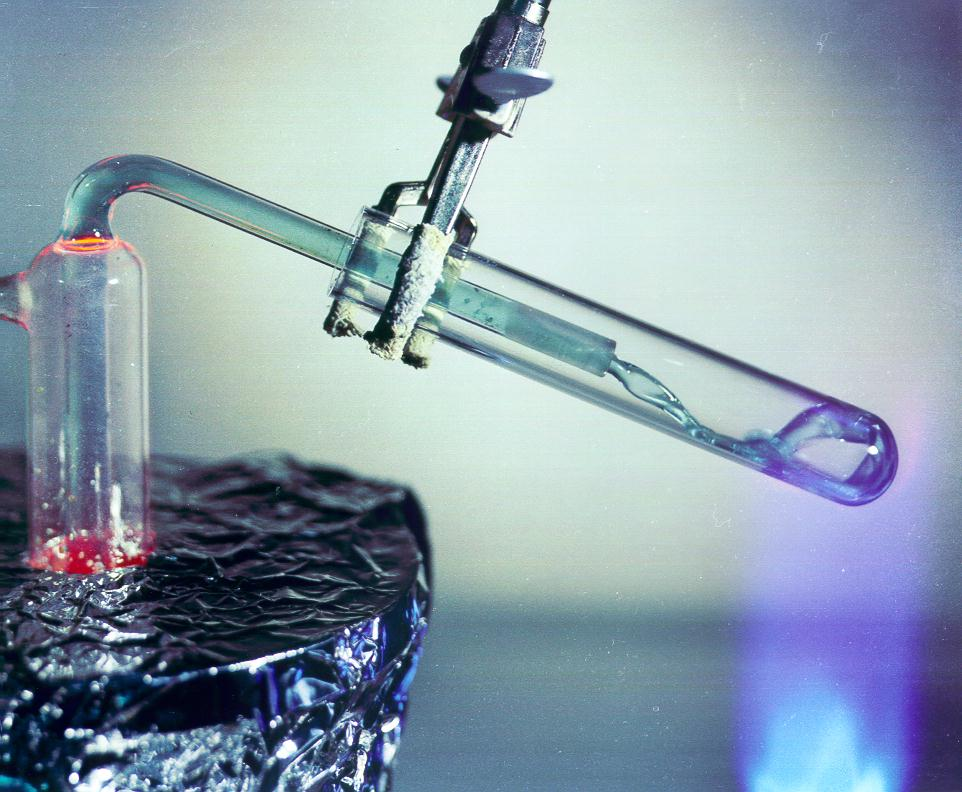
Molten FLiBe

The salt mixtures are chosen to make the reactor safer and more practical.

==== Mixtures ====
Reactor salts are usually close to eutectic mixtures to reduce their melting point. A low melting point simplifies melting the salt at startup and reduces the risk of the salt freezing as it is cooled in the heat exchanger.

Due to the high "redox window" of fused fluoride salts, the redox potential of the fused salt system can be changed. Fluorine-lithium-beryllium ("FLiBe") can be used with beryllium additions to lower the redox potential and nearly eliminate corrosion. However, since beryllium is extremely toxic, special precautions must be engineered into the design to prevent its release into the environment. Many other salts can cause plumbing corrosion, especially if the reactor is hot enough to make highly reactive hydrogen.

To date, most research has focused on FLiBe, because lithium and beryllium are reasonably effective moderators and form a eutectic salt mixture with a lower melting point than each of the constituent salts. Beryllium also improves the neutron economy through neutron doubling, which occurs when a beryllium nucleus emits two neutrons after absorbing a single neutron. For the fuel carrying salts, generally 1% or 2% (by mole) of UF_{4} is added. Thorium and plutonium fluorides have also been used.

==== Fluorine ====
Fluorine has only one stable isotope (^{19}F), and does not easily become radioactive under neutron bombardment. Compared to chlorine and other halides, fluorine also absorbs fewer neutrons and slows ("moderates") neutrons better. Low-valence fluorides boil at high temperatures, though many pentafluorides and hexafluorides boil at low temperatures. They must be very hot before they break down into their constituent elements. Such molten salts are "chemically stable" when maintained well below their boiling points. Fluoride salts dissolve poorly in water, and do not form burnable hydrogen.

Fluorine also aids in fission product stability, as most non-noble gas fission products quickly react with the fluorine to form non-volatile salt-soluble compounds.

==== Chlorine ====
Chlorine has two stable isotopes (^{35}Cl and ^{37}Cl), as well as a slow-decaying isotope between them which facilitates neutron absorption by ^{35}Cl.

Chlorides permit fast breeder reactors to be constructed. Much less research has been done on reactor designs using chloride salts. Chlorine, unlike fluorine, must be purified to isolate the heavier stable isotope, ^{37}Cl, thus reducing production of sulfur tetrachloride that occurs when ^{35}Cl absorbs a neutron to become ^{36}Cl, then degrades by beta decay to ^{36}S.

Limited theoretical work has been done on NaCl-PuCl_{3} salt mixtures.

==== Lithium ====
Lithium must be in the form of purified ^{7}Li, because ^{6}Li effectively captures neutrons and produces tritium. Even if pure ^{7}Li is used, salts containing lithium cause significant tritium production, comparable with heavy water reactors.

=== Fused salt purification ===
Techniques for preparing and handling molten salt were first developed at ORNL. The purpose of salt purification is to eliminate oxides, sulfur and metal impurities. Oxides could result in the deposition of solid particles in reactor operation. Sulfur must be removed because of its corrosive attack on nickel-based alloys at operational temperature. Structural metals such as chromium, nickel, and iron must be removed for corrosion control.

A water content reduction purification stage using HF and helium sweep gas was specified to run at 400 °C. Oxide and sulfur contamination in the salt mixtures were removed using gas sparging of HF/H_{2} mixture, with the salt heated to 600 °C. Structural metal contamination in the salt mixtures were removed using hydrogen gas sparging, at 700 °C. Solid ammonium hydrofluoride was proposed as a safer alternative for oxide removal.

=== Fused salt processing ===
The possibility of online processing can be an MSR advantage. Continuous processing would reduce the inventory of fission products, control corrosion and improve neutron economy by removing fission products with high neutron absorption cross-section, especially xenon. This makes the MSR particularly suited to the neutron-poor thorium fuel cycle. Online fuel processing can introduce risks of fuel processing accidents, which can trigger release of radio isotopes.

In some thorium breeding scenarios, the intermediate product protactinium ^{233}Pa would be removed from the reactor and allowed to decay into highly pure ^{233}U, an attractive bomb-making material. More modern designs propose to use a lower specific power or a separate thorium breeding blanket. This dilutes the protactinium to such an extent that few protactinium atoms absorb a second neutron or, via a (n, 2n) reaction (in which an incident neutron is not absorbed but instead knocks a neutron out of the nucleus), generate ^{232}U. Because ^{232}U has a short half-life and its decay chain contains hard gamma emitters, it makes the isotopic mix of uranium less attractive for bomb-making. This benefit would come with the added expense of a larger fissile inventory or a 2-fluid design with a large quantity of blanket salt.

The necessary fuel salt reprocessing technology has been demonstrated, but only at laboratory scale. A prerequisite to full-scale commercial reactor design is the R&D to engineer an economically competitive fuel salt cleaning system.

== Fuel ==
Traditional nuclear reactors tend to use partially enriched uranium, but MSRs may allow for less traditional fuel cycles.

=== Thorium cycle ===
Thorium may be transmuted to Uranium-233 using the Thorium fuel cycle. A chief advantage of the Thorium cycle is that it produces less transuranic waste, which tends to be very radioactive and difficult to deal with. Theoretically, breeding ratios of up to 1.13 could be achieved. Thorium is three times more abundant than Uranium.

=== Fuel reprocessing ===
Changes in the composition of a MSR fast neutron (kg/GW)

Reprocessing refers to the chemical separation of fissionable uranium and plutonium from spent fuel. Such recovery could increase the risk of nuclear proliferation. In the United States the regulatory regime has varied dramatically across administrations.

== Costs and economics ==
A systematic literature review from 2020 concludes that there is very limited information on economics and finance of MSRs, with low quality of the information and that cost estimations are uncertain.

== Types of molten-salt reactors ==
While many design variants have been proposed, there are four main categories regarding the role of molten salt:

Category	Examples
Molten salt fuel – externally circulating	ARE • AWB • CMSR • DMSR • EVOL • LFTR • IMSR • MSFR • MSRE • MSDR • DFR • TMSR-500 • TMSR-LF
Molten salt fuel – static	SSR
Molten salt coolant only	FHR • TMSR-SF

The use of molten salt as fuel and as coolant are independent design choices – the original circulating-fuel-salt MSRE and the more recent static-fuel-salt SSR use salt as fuel and salt as coolant; the DFR uses salt as fuel but metal as coolant; and the FHR has solid fuel but salt as coolant.

=== Designs ===
MSRs can be burners or breeders. They can be fast or thermal or epithermal. Thermal reactors typically employ a moderator (usually graphite) to slow the neutrons down and moderate temperature. They can accept a variety of fuels (low-enriched uranium, thorium, depleted uranium, waste products) and coolants (fluoride, chloride, lithium, beryllium, mixed). Fuel cycle can be either closed or once-through. They can be monolithic or modular, large or small. The reactor can adopt a loop, modular or integral configuration. Variations include:

==== Molten salt fast reactor ====
The molten-salt fast reactor (MSFR) is a proposed design with the fuel dissolved in a fluoride salt coolant. The MSFR is one of the two variants of MSRs selected by the Generation IV International Forum (GIF) for further development, the other being the FHR or AHTR. The MSFR is based on a fast neutron spectrum and is believed to be a long-term substitute to solid-fueled fast reactors. They have been studied for almost a decade, mainly by calculations and determination of basic physical and chemical properties in the European Union and Russian Federation. A MSFR is regarded sustainable because there are no fuel shortages. Operation of a MSFR does in theory not generate or require large amounts of transuranic (TRU) elements. When steady state is achieved in a MSFR, there is no longer a need for uranium enrichment facilities.

MSFRs may be breeder reactors. They operate without a moderator in the core such as graphite, so graphite life-span is no longer a problem. This results in a breeder reactor with a fast neutron spectrum that operates in the Thorium fuel cycle. MSFRs contain relatively small initial inventories of ^{233}U. MSFRs run on liquid fuel with no solid matter inside the core. This leads to the possibility of reaching specific power that is much higher than reactors using solid fuel. The heat produced goes directly into the heat transfer fluid. In the MSFR, a small amount of molten salt is set aside to be processed for fission product removal and then returned to the reactor. This gives MSFRs the capability of reprocessing the fuel without stopping the reactor. This is very different compared to solid-fueled reactors because they have separate facilities to produce the solid fuel and process spent nuclear fuel. The MSFR can operate using a large variety of fuel compositions due to its on-line fuel control and flexible fuel processing.

The standard MSFR would be a 3000 MWth reactor that has a total fuel salt volume of 18 m^{3} with a mean fuel temperature of 750 °C. The core's shape is a compact cylinder with a height to diameter ratio of 1 where liquid fluoride fuel salt flows from the bottom to the top. The return circulation of the salt, from top to bottom, is broken up into 16 groups of pumps and heat exchangers located around the core. The fuel salt takes approximately 3 to 4 seconds to complete a full cycle. At any given time during operation, half of the total fuel salt volume is in the core and the rest is in the external fuel circuit (salt collectors, salt-bubble separators, fuel heat exchangers, pumps, salt injectors and pipes). MSFRs contain an emergency draining system that is triggered and achieved by redundant and reliable devices such as detection and opening technology. During operation, the fuel salt circulation speed can be adjusted by controlling the power of the pumps in each sector. The intermediate fluid circulation speed can be adjusted by controlling the power of the intermediate circuit pumps. The temperature of the intermediate fluid in the intermediate exchangers can be managed through the use of a double bypass. This allows the temperature of the intermediate fluid at the conversion exchanger inlet to be held constant while its temperature is increased in a controlled way at the inlet of the intermediate exchangers. The temperature of the core can be adjusted by varying the proportion of bubbles injected in the core since it reduces the salt density. As a result, it reduces the mean temperature of the fuel salt. Usually the fuel salt temperature can be brought down by 100 °C using a 3% proportion of bubbles. MSFRs have two draining modes, controlled routine draining and emergency draining. During controlled routine draining, fuel salt is transferred to actively cooled storage tanks. The fuel temperature can be lowered before draining, this may slow down the process. This type of draining could be done every 1 to 5 years when the sectors are replaced. Emergency draining is done when an irregularity occurs during operation. The fuel salt can be drained directly into the emergency draining tank either by active devices or by passive means. The draining must be fast to limit the fuel salt heating in a loss of heat removal event.

==== Fluoride salt-cooled high-temperature reactor ====
The fluoride salt-cooled high-temperature reactor (FHR), also called advanced high temperature reactor (AHTR), is a type of salt-cooled reactor. The FHR uses a solid fuel along with a molten fluoride salt as coolant.

The concept was proposed as the Advanced High Temperature Reactor by ORNL in 2003. Following several years of conceptual development, the Pebble-Bed Fluoride Salt-Cooled High-Temperature Reactor (PB-FHR) design was launched by the University of California, Berkeley in 2014. This design was then used as the basis for Kairos Power's KP-FHR small modular reactor. The concept is also being explored in China by the Shanghai Institute Of Applied Physics (SINAP) as part of the TMSR project.

One version of the Very-high-temperature reactor (VHTR) under study was the liquid-salt very-high-temperature reactor (LS-VHTR). It uses liquid salt as a coolant in the primary loop, rather than a single helium loop. It relies on tristructural-isotropic (TRISO) fuel dispersed in graphite. Early AHTR research focused on graphite in the form of graphite rods that would be inserted in hexagonal moderating graphite blocks, but current studies focus primarily on pebble-type fuel. The LS-VHTR can work at very high temperatures (the boiling point of most molten salt candidates is >1400 °C); low-pressure cooling that can be used to match hydrogen production facility conditions (most thermochemical cycles require temperatures in excess of 750 °C); better electric conversion efficiency than a helium-cooled VHTR operating in similar conditions; passive safety systems and better retention of fission products in the event of an accident.

==== Liquid-fluoride thorium reactor ====
Reactors containing molten thorium salt, called liquid fluoride thorium reactors (LFTR), would tap the thorium fuel cycle. Private companies from Japan, Russia, Australia and the United States, and the Chinese government, have expressed interest in developing this technology.

Advocates estimate that five hundred metric tons of thorium could supply U.S. energy needs for one year. The U.S. Geological Survey estimates that the largest-known U.S. thorium deposit, the Lemhi Pass district on the Montana-Idaho border, contains thorium reserves of 64,000 metric tons.

Traditionally, these reactors were known as molten salt breeder reactors (MSBRs) or thorium molten-salt reactors (TMSRs), but the name LFTR was promoted as a rebrand in the early 2000s by Kirk Sorensen.

==== Stable salt reactor ====
The stable salt reactor is a relatively recent concept which holds the molten salt fuel statically in traditional LWR fuel pins. Pumping of the fuel salt, and all the corrosion/deposition/maintenance/containment issues arising from circulating a highly radioactive, hot and chemically complex fluid, are no longer required. The fuel pins are immersed in a separate, non-fissionable fluoride salt which acts as primary coolant.

==== Dual-fluid molten-salt reactors ====
A prototypical example of a dual fluid reactor is the lead-cooled, salt-fueled reactor.

== History ==
=== 1950s ===
==== Aircraft Reactor Experiment, US ====
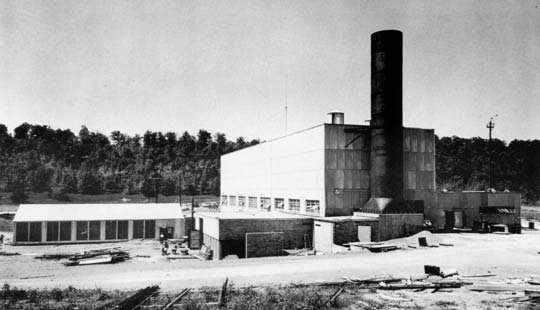
Aircraft Reactor Experiment building at the Oak Ridge National Laboratory (ORNL). It was later retrofitted for the MSRE.

MSR research started with the U.S. Aircraft Reactor Experiment (ARE) in support of the U.S. Aircraft Nuclear Propulsion program. ARE was a 2.5 MW_{th} nuclear reactor experiment designed to attain a high energy density for use as an engine in a nuclear-powered bomber.

The project included experiments, including high temperature and engine tests collectively called the Heat Transfer Reactor Experiments: HTRE-1, HTRE-2 and HTRE-3 at the National Reactor Test Station (now Idaho National Laboratory) as well as an experimental high-temperature molten-salt reactor at Oak Ridge National Laboratory – the ARE.

ARE used molten fluoride salt NaF/ZrF_{4}/UF_{4} (53-41-6 mol%) as fuel, moderated by beryllium oxide (BeO). Liquid sodium was a secondary coolant.

The experiment had a peak temperature of 860 °C. It produced 100 MWh over nine days in 1954. This experiment used Inconel 600 alloy for the metal structure and piping.

An MSR was operated at the Critical Experiments Facility of the Oak Ridge National Laboratory in 1957. It was part of the circulating-fuel reactor program of the Pratt & Whitney Aircraft Company (PWAC). This was called Pratt and Whitney Aircraft Reactor-1 (PWAR-1). The experiment was run for a few weeks and at essentially zero power, although it reached criticality. The operating temperature was held constant at approximately 675 °C (1,250 °F). The PWAR-1 used NaF/ZrF_{4}/UF_{4} as the primary fuel and coolant. It was one of three critical MSRs ever built.

=== 1960s and 1970s ===
==== MSRE at Oak Ridge, US ====
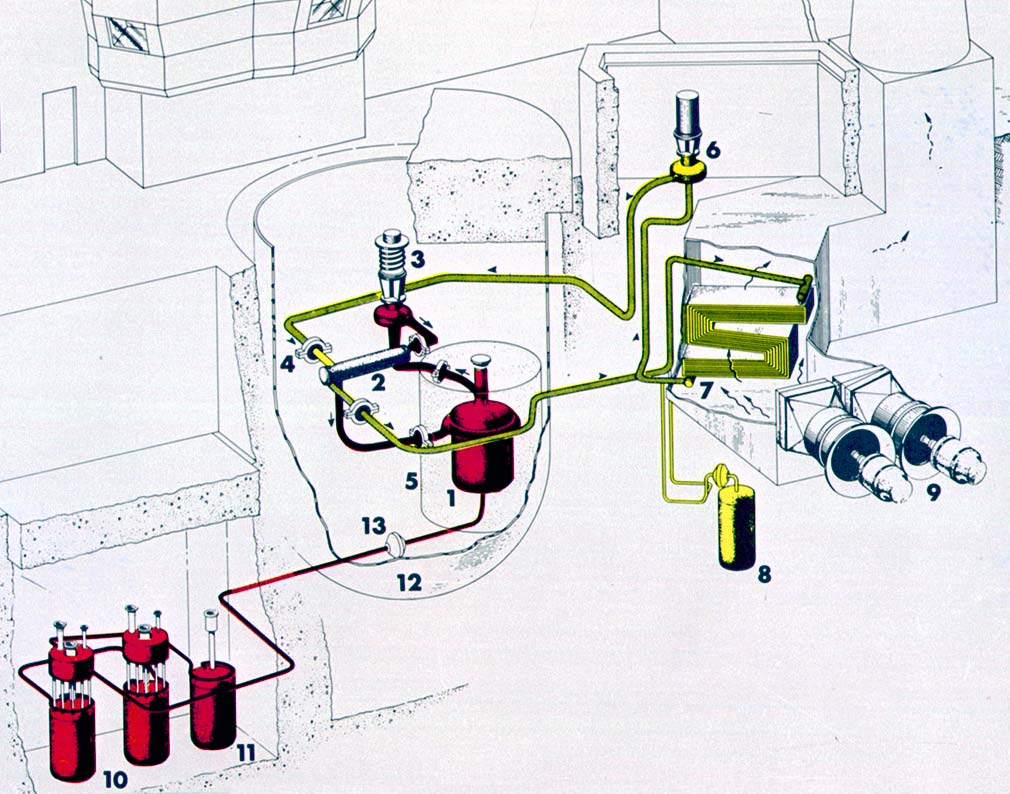
MSRE plant diagram

Oak Ridge National Laboratory (ORNL) took the lead in researching MSRs through the 1960s. Much of their work culminated with the Molten-Salt Reactor Experiment (MSRE). MSRE was a 7.4 MW_{th} test reactor simulating the neutronic "kernel" of a type of epithermal thorium molten salt breeder reactor called the liquid fluoride thorium reactor (LFTR). The large (expensive) breeding blanket of thorium salt was omitted in favor of neutron measurements.

MSRE's piping, core vat and structural components were made from Hastelloy-N, moderated by pyrolytic graphite. It went critical in 1965 and ran for four years. Its fuel was LiF/BeF_{2}/ZrF_{4}/UF_{4} (65-29-5-1)mol%. The graphite core moderated it. Its secondary coolant was FLiBe (2LiF·BeF_{2}). It reached temperatures as high as 650 °C (1,202 °F) and achieved the equivalent of about 1.5 years of full power operation.

==== Theoretical designs at Oak Ridge, US ====
===== Molten salt breeder reactor =====
From 1970 to 1976 ORNL researched during the 1970–1976 a molten salt breeder reactor (MSBR) design. Fuel was to be LiF/BeF_{2}/ThF_{4}/UF_{4} (72-16-12-0.4) mol% with graphite moderator. The secondary coolant was to be NaF/Na[BF_{4}]. Its peak operating temperature was to be 705 °C (1,301 °F). It would follow a 4-year replacement schedule. The MSR program closed down in the early 1970s in favor of the liquid metal fast-breeder reactor (LMFBR), after which research stagnated in the United States. As of 2011, ARE and MSRE remained the only molten-salt reactors ever operated.

The MSBR project received funding from 1968 to 1976 of (in 2025 dollars) $81.8 million.

Officially, the program was cancelled because:

- The political and technical support for the program in the United States was too thin geographically. Within the United States the technology was well understood only in Oak Ridge.
- The MSR program was in competition with the fast breeder program at the time, which got an early start and had copious government development funds with contracts that benefited many parts of the country. When the MSR development program had progressed far enough to justify an expanded program leading to commercial development, the United States Atomic Energy Commission (AEC) could not justify the diversion of substantial funds from the LMFBR to a competing program.

===== Denatured molten-salt reactor =====
The denatured molten-salt reactor (DMSR) was an Oak Ridge theoretical design that was never built.

Engel et al. 1980 said the project "examined the conceptual feasibility of a molten-salt power reactor fueled with denatured uranium-235 (i.e. with low-enriched uranium) and operated with a minimum of chemical processing." The main design priority was proliferation resistance. Although the DMSR can theoretically be fueled partially by thorium or plutonium, fueling solely with low enriched uranium (LEU) helps maximize proliferation resistance.

Other goals of the DMSR were to minimize research and development and to maximize feasibility. The Generation IV international Forum (GIF) includes "salt processing" as a technology gap for molten-salt reactors. The DMSR design theoretically requires minimal chemical processing because it is a burner rather than a breeder.

==== United Kingdom ====
The UK's Atomic Energy Research Establishment (AERE) was developing an alternative MSR design across its National Laboratories at Harwell,

, Risley and Winfrith. AERE opted to focus on a lead-cooled 2.5 GWe Molten Salt Fast Reactor (MSFR) concept using a chloride. They also researched helium gas as a coolant.

The UK MSFR would have been fuelled by plutonium, a fuel considered to be 'free' by the program's research scientists, because of the UK's plutonium stockpile.

Despite their different designs, ORNL and AERE maintained contact during this period with information exchange and expert visits. Theoretical work on the concept was conducted between 1964 and 1966, while experimental work was ongoing between 1968 and 1973. The program received annual government funding of around £100,000–£200,000 (equivalent to £2m–£3m in 2005). This funding came to an end in 1974, partly due to the success of the Prototype Fast Reactor at Dounreay which was considered a priority for funding as it went critical in the same year.

==== Soviet Union ====
In the USSR, a molten-salt reactor research program was started in the second half of the 1970s at the Kurchatov Institute. It included theoretical and experimental studies, particularly the investigation of mechanical, corrosion and radiation properties of the molten salt container materials. The main findings supported the conclusion that no physical nor technological obstacles prevented the practical implementation of MSRs.

=== Twenty-first century ===
MSR interest resumed in the new millennium due to continuing delays in fusion power and other nuclear power programs and increasing demand for energy sources that would incur minimal greenhouse gas (GHG) emissions.

As of 2016, Oak Ridge National Laboratory is doing research to support the development of MSRs. They are studying salt purification, production, and corrosion testing, as well as developing simulation software for modeling reactor core conditions, neutronics, and neutron transport, including in liquid fueled reactors where the fuel circulates outside the core.

== Commercial/national/international projects ==
=== Canada ===
Terrestrial Energy, a Canadian-based company, is developing a DMSR design called the Integral Molten Salt Reactor (IMSR). The IMSR is designed to be deployable as a small modular reactor (SMR). Their design currently undergoing licensing is 400MW thermal (190MW electrical). With high operating temperatures, the IMSR has applications in industrial heat markets as well as traditional power markets. The main design features include neutron moderation from graphite, fueling with low-enriched uranium and a compact and replaceable Core-unit. Decay heat is removed passively using nitrogen (with air as an emergency alternative). The latter feature permits the operational simplicity necessary for industrial deployment.

Terrestrial completed the first phase of a prelicensing review by the Canadian Nuclear Safety Commission in 2017, which provided a regulatory opinion that the design features are generally safe enough to eventually obtain a license to construct the reactor.

Moltex Energy Canada, a subsidiary of UK-based Moltex Energy Ltd, has obtained support from New Brunswick Power for the development of a pilot plant in Point Lepreau, Canada, and financial backing from IDOM (an international engineering firm) and is currently engaged in the Canadian Vendor Design Review process. The plant will employ the waste-burning version of the company's stable salt reactor design.

=== China ===
TMSR (Thorium Molten Salt Reactor) project logo, from the Chinese Academy of Sciences

China initiated a thorium research project in January 2011, and spent about 3 billion yuan (US$500 million) on it by 2021.

In 2021, the government announced plans for a first-of-its-kind, 100 megawatt commercial molten-salt reactor in the desert city of Wuwei that does not need water for cooling. It was slated for construction by 2030. It would be capable of generating 100 megawatts of electricity, enough to provide power for 100,000 people. They said that a 2 MW prototype reactor was already expected to be completed next month, August 2021, with the first tests beginning as early as September. China stated that the Wuwei prototype would produce energy for around 1,000 homes.

A 100 MW demonstrator of the solid fuel version (TMSR-SF), based on pebble bed technology, was planned to be ready by 2024. A 10 MW pilot and a larger demonstrator of the liquid fuel (TMSR-LF) variant were targeted for 2024 and 2035, respectively. China then accelerated its program to build two 12 MW reactors underground at Wuwei research facilities by 2020, beginning with the 2 megawatt TMSR-LF1 prototype. The project sought to test new corrosion-resistant materials. In 2017, ANSTO/Shanghai Institute Of Applied Physics announced the creation of a NiMo-SiC alloy for use in MSRs.

Further work on commercial reactors was announced with the target completion date of 2030. Chinese government plans to realize similar reactors in deserts and plains of western China as well as up to 30 in countries involved in China's "Belt and Road" initiative.

In 2023, the 2MWt reactor reached criticality and in late 2024 was refueled while continuing to operate.

=== Denmark ===
Copenhagen Atomics is a Danish molten salt technology company developing mass manufacturable molten salt reactors. The Copenhagen Atomics Waste Burner is a single-fluid, heavy water moderated, fluoride-based, thermal spectrum and autonomously controlled molten-salt reactor. This is designed to fit inside of a leak-tight, 40-foot, stainless steel shipping container. The heavy water moderator is thermally insulated from the salt and continuously drained and cooled to below 50 °C (122 °F). A molten lithium-7 deuteroxide (^{7}LiOD) moderator version is also being researched. The reactor utilizes the thorium fuel cycle using separated plutonium from spent nuclear fuel as the initial fissile load for the first generation of reactors, eventually transitioning to a thorium breeder. Copenhagen Atomics is actively developing and testing valves, pumps, heat exchangers, measurement systems, salt chemistry and purification systems, and control systems and software for molten salt applications.

Seaborg Technologies is developing the core for a compact molten-salt reactor (CMSR). The CMSR is a high temperature, single salt, thermal MSR designed to go critical on commercially available low enriched uranium. The CMSR design is modular, and uses proprietary NaOH moderator. The reactor core is estimated to be replaced every 12 years. During operation, the fuel will not be replaced and will burn for the entire 12-year reactor lifetime. The first version of the Seaborg core is planned to produce 250 MW_{th} power and 100 MW_{e} power. As a power plant, the CMSR will be able to deliver electricity, clean water and heating/cooling to around 200,000 households.

=== France ===
The CNRS project EVOL (Evaluation and viability of liquid fuel fast reactor system) project, with the objective of proposing a design of the molten salt fast reactor (MSFR), released its final report in 2014. Various MSR projects like FHR, MOSART, MSFR, and TMSR have common research and development themes.

The EVOL project will be continued by the EU-funded Safety Assessment of the Molten Salt Fast Reactor (SAMOFAR) project, in which several European research institutes and universities collaborate.

=== Germany ===
The German Institute for Solid State Nuclear Physics in Berlin has proposed the dual fluid reactor as a concept for a fast breeder lead-cooled MSR. The original MSR concept used the fluid salt to provide the fission materials and also to remove the heat. Thus it had problems with the needed flow speed. Using 2 different fluids in separate circles is thought to solve the problem.

=== India ===
In 2015, Indian researchers published a MSR design, as an alternative path to thorium-based reactors, according to India's three-stage nuclear power programme.

=== Indonesia ===
Thorcon is developing the TMSR-500 molten-salt reactor for the Indonesian market. National Research and Innovation Agency, through its Research Organization for Nuclear Energy announced its renewal of interest on MSR reactor research on 29 March 2022 and planned to study and develop MSR for thorium-fueled nuclear reactors.

=== Japan ===
The Fuji Molten Salt Reactor is a 100 to 200 MW_{e} LFTR, using technology similar to the Oak Ridge project, but the project seems to lack funding.

=== Russia ===
In 2020, Rosatom announced plans to build a 10 MW_{th} FLiBe

MSR. It would be fueled by plutonium from reprocessed VVER spent nuclear fuel and fluorides of minor actinides. It is expected to launch in 2031 at Mining and Chemical Combine.

=== United Kingdom ===
The Alvin Weinberg Foundation is a British non-profit organization founded in 2011, dedicated to raising awareness about the potential of thorium energy and LFTR. It was formally launched at the House of Lords on 8 September 2011. It is named after American nuclear physicist Alvin M. Weinberg, who pioneered thorium MSR research.

Moltex Energy's stable-salt reactor design was selected as the most suitable of six MSR designs for UK implementation in a 2015 study commissioned by the UK's innovation agency, Innovate UK. UK government support has been weak, but the company's UK arm, MoltexFLEX, launched its FLEX small modular design in October 2022.

=== United States ===
Idaho National Laboratory designed (2013) a molten-salt-cooled, molten-salt-fuelled reactor with a prospective output of 1000 MW_{e}.

Kirk Sorensen, former NASA scientist and chief nuclear technologist at Teledyne Brown Engineering, is a long-time promoter of the thorium fuel cycle, coining the term liquid fluoride thorium reactor. In 2011, Sorensen founded Flibe Energy.

Transatomic Power pursued what it termed a waste-annihilating molten-salt reactor (WAMSR), intended to consume existing spent nuclear fuel, from 2011 until ceasing operation in 2018 and open-sourcing their research.

In January 2016, the United States Department of Energy announced a $80m award fund to develop Generation IV reactor designs. One of the two beneficiaries, Southern Company will use the funding to develop a molten chloride fast reactor (MCFR), a type of MSR developed earlier by British scientists.

In 2021, Tennessee Valley Authority (TVA) and Kairos Power announced a TRISO-fueled, low-pressure fluoride salt-cooled 140 MWe test reactor to be built in Oak Ridge, Tennessee. A construction permit for the project was issued by the US Nuclear Regulatory Commission (NRC) in 2023. The design is expected to operate at 45% efficiency. The outlet temperature is 650 °C (1,202 °F). The main steam pressure is 19 MPa. The reactor structure is 316 stainless steel. The fuel is enriched to 19.75%. Loss-of-power cooling is passive. In February 2024 DOE and Kairos Power signed a $303M Technology Investment Agreement to support the design, construction, and commissioning of the reactor. The company is to receive fixed payments upon completing project milestones.

Also in 2021, Southern Company, in collaboration with TerraPower and the U.S. Department of Energy announced plans to build the Molten Chloride Reactor Experiment (MCRE), the first fast-spectrum salt reactor at the Idaho National Laboratory.

Abilene Christian University (ACU) has applied to the NRC for a construction licence for a 1MWt molten-salt research reactor (MSRR), to be built on its campus in Abilene, Texas, as part of the Nuclear Energy eXperimental Testing (NEXT) laboratory. ACU plans for the MSRR to achieve criticality by December 2025. ACU received the FLiBe salt for the reactor in September 2026.

== List of molten-salt reactors ==
Model	Country	Thermal power (MW)	Electric power (MW)	Year of commission	Year of decommission	Notes
ARE	United States	2.5		1954	1954	Test reactor; circulating NaF–ZrF_{4}–^{235}UF_{4} fuel
MSRE	United States	8		1964	1969	Test reactor; circulating ^{7}LiF–BeF_{2}–ZrF_{4}–UF_{4} fuel (First ^{235}U, later ^{233}U)
TMSR-LF1	China	2		2023	Operational	Test reactor; circulating ^{7}LiF–BeF_{2}–ZrF_{4}–^{235}UF_{4} (HALEU driver fuel, with fertile ThF_{4} added later)
Hermes	United States	35		Under construction		Test reactor; solid TRISO fuel with FLiBe coolant
Hermes 2	United States		50	Under construction		Commercial reactor; solid TRISO fuel with FLiBe coolant
MSR-1	United States	1		Under construction		Test reactor; circulating FLiBe–UF_{4} (HALEU) fuel
MCRE	United States	0.15		Under construction		Test reactor; circulating NaCl–^{235}UCl_{3}

== See also ==
- Aqueous homogeneous reactor – Type of nuclear reactor
- Integral fast reactor – Nuclear reactor design
- Nuclear aircraft – Flying machine that relies on thrust generated from nuclear energy
- Nuclear waste – Unusable radioactive materials
