= Stable salt reactor =

Nuclear reactor design

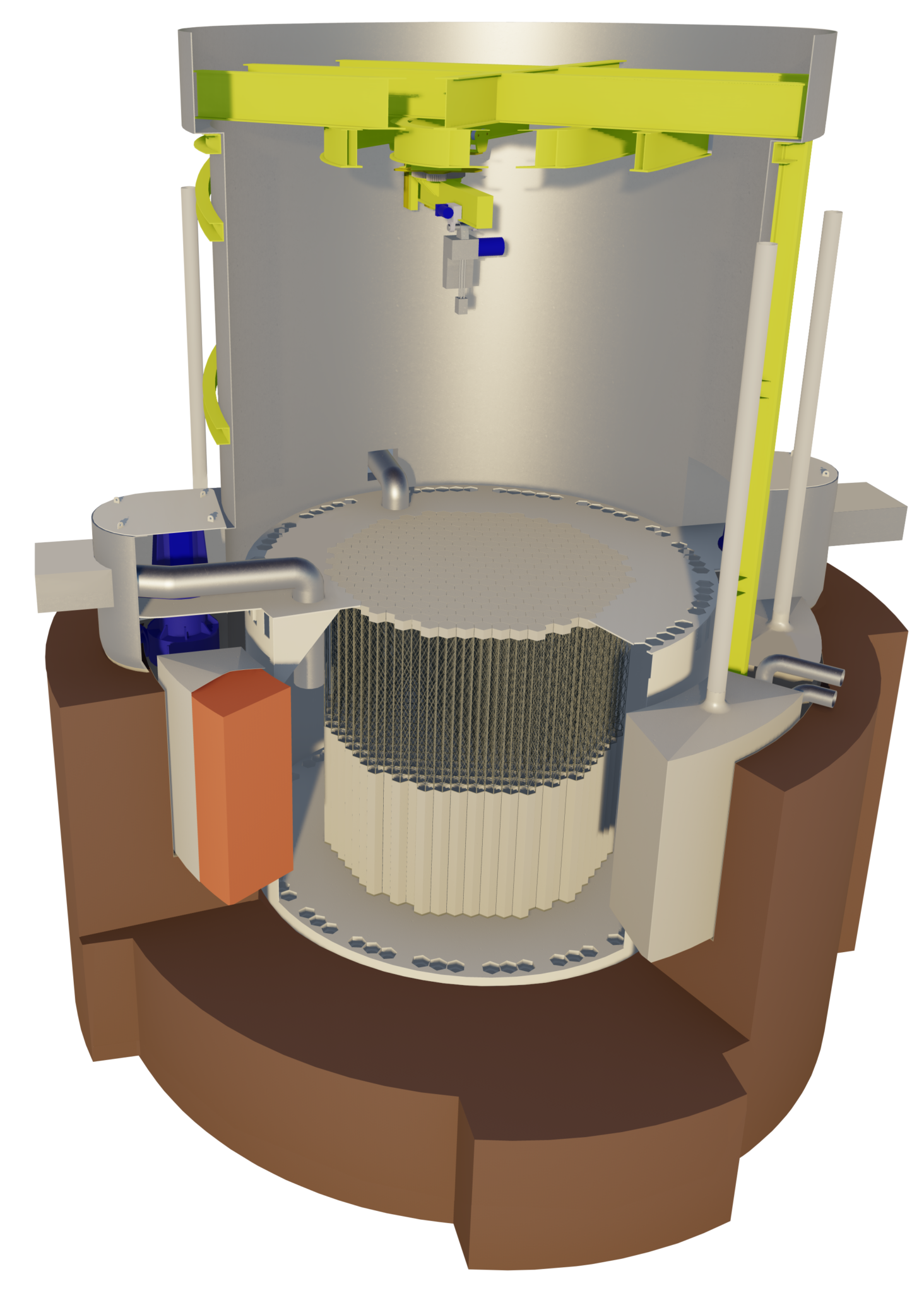
A cutout of a proposed stable salt reactor core

The stable salt reactor (SSR) is a Canadian reactor design created by Moltex Energy Limited. The Stable Salt Reactor - Wasteburner (SSR-W) design incorporates elements of the molten salt reactor designed to be intrinsically safe and more economical than traditional light water reactors.

SSRs are designed so that they do not need containment structures and components to mitigate radioactive releases in accident scenarios. The design avoids the type of widespread radiological contamination that occurred in the Chernobyl or Fukushima accidents because any hazardous isotopes are chemically bound to the coolant. The modular design allows factory production of components.

The SSR-W fuel design is a hybrid between light water reactor fuel assemblies and traditional molten salt reactor approaches, in which the fuel is mixed with the coolant. The liquid salt fuel mixture is contained within fuel assemblies that are very similar to light water reactor technology. The fuel assemblies are then submerged in a pool of liquid salt coolant.

== Technology ==
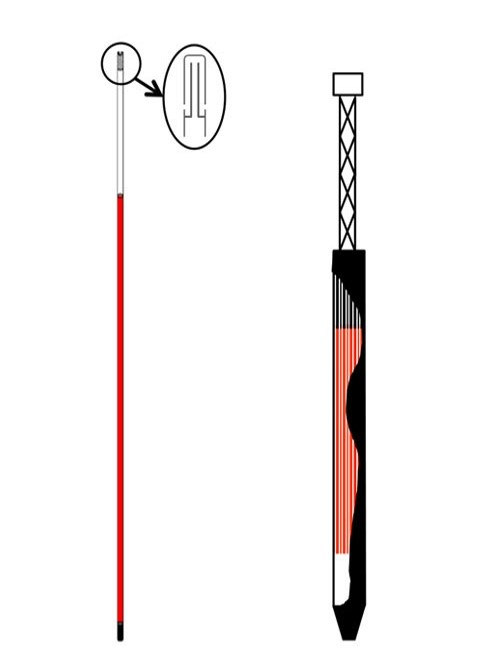
Single fuel tube showing 'diving bell' gas vent and an entire assembly.

The basic unit of the reactor core is the fuel assembly. In the SSR-W, each assembly contains nearly 300 fuel tubes of 10 mm diameter, filled to a height of 1.8 m with fuel salt. The tubes have “diving bell” gas vents at the top to allow fission gases to escape. The assemblies are loaded vertically into the core, with fresh assemblies entering through an airlock and inserted into the core through a fuelling machine.

=== Fuel and materials ===
The fuel in the SSR is two-thirds sodium chloride (table salt) and one-third mixed lanthanide/actinide trichlorides. Fuel is sourced from converted spent nuclear fuel from existing conventional reactors. Another fuel source is civil plutonium dioxide from PUREX downblended with chloride impurities, wit h are added to reduce any proliferation concerns.

Trichlorides are more thermodynamically stable than the corresponding fluoride salts, and can therefore be maintained in a strongly reducing state by contact with sacrificial nuclear-grade zirconium metal added as a coating on, or an insert within, the fuel tube of the SSR-W. As a result the fuel tube can be made from standard nuclear certified steel without risk of corrosion. Since the reactor operates in the fast spectrum, the tubes will be exposed to very high neutron flux and so will suffer high levels of radiation damage estimated at 100–200 dpa over the tube life. The highly neutron damage tolerant steel, PE16 is used for the tubes. Other steels with fast-neutron tolerance (such as T9, NF616 and 15-15Ti) can also be used depending on the local supply chain capabilities.

The average power density in the SSR-W fuel salt is 150 kW/L, which allows a large temperature margin below the boiling point of the salt.

=== Coolants ===
The coolant salt in the SSR-W reactor tank is a chloride-based coolant salt. The coolant also contains an agent to reduce its redox potential, making it virtually non-corrosive to standard types of steel. The reactor tank, support structures and heat exchangers can therefore be built with standard 316L stainless steel.

The coolant salt is circulated through the reactor core by pumps attached to the heat exchangers in each module. Flow rates are modest (approximately 1 m/s) with a resulting low requirement for pump power. Redundant engineering allows operation to continue in the event of a pump failure.

== Safety ==
SSRs are designed with intrinsic safety characteristics being the first line of defence. No operator or active system is required to maintain the reactor in a safe and stable state. The following are primary intrinsic safety features of the SSR.

=== Reactivity control ===
As the SSR is self-controlling, no mechanical control is required. This is made possible by the combination of a high negative temperature coefficient of reactivity and the ability to continually extract heat from the fuel tubes. As heat is taken out of the system the temperature drops, causing the reactivity to go up. Conversely, when the reactor heats up, reactivity decreases. This provides security against all overpower scenarios, such as a reactivity insertion accident. For the SSR-W, diverse and redundant safety is also provided by an array of gravitationally driven boron carbide control rods.

=== Non-volatile radioactive material ===
Molten salt fuel does not create hazardous volatile material like iodine and caesium. For the SSR-W, the noble gases xenon and krypton leave the reactor core in normal operation, but are trapped until their radioactive isotopes decay.

=== Low pressure design ===
Its core runs at atmospheric pressure. Physical separation of the steam-generating system from the radioactive core, by means of a secondary coolant loop. fuel tubes also vent off fission gases into the surrounding coolant salt.

=== Decay heat removal ===
Immediately after a nuclear reactor shuts down, almost 7% of its previous operating power continues to be generated, from the decay of short half-life fission products. In conventional reactors, removing this decay heat passively is challenging because of the reactors’ low temperatures. An SSR operates at much higher temperatures; so, this heat can be rapidly transferred away from the core. In the event of a reactor shutdown and failure of all active heat-removal systems in the SSR, decay heat from the core dissipates into air-cooling ducts around the perimeter of the tank that operate continually. This is known as the Emergency Heat Removal System. The main heat-transfer mechanism is radiative. Heat transfer goes up substantially with temperature; so, it is negligible at operating temperatures but sufficient at higher-temperature accident conditions. The reactor components are not damaged during this process and the plant can be restarted afterwards.

== Consumption of nuclear waste ==
Most countries that use nuclear power store spent nuclear fuel until its radioactivity has reduced to levels similar to that of natural uranium. As the SSR-W consumes nuclear waste it reduces the volume of waste that ends up in long-term storage.

Operating in the fast spectrum, the SSR-W transmutes long-lived actinides into more stable isotopes. The SSR-W can have lanthanide and actinide contamination in its fuel, so long as it can still go critical. This low level of purity simplifies the recycling method for existing waste.

The recycling method is based on pyroprocessing. A 2016 report by the Canadian Nuclear Laboratories on recycling of CANDU fuel estimated that pyroprocessing would cost about half as much as more conventional reprocessing. Pyroprocessing for the SSR-W uses only one third of the steps of conventional pyroprocessing.

Waste from the SSR-W takes the form of solid salt in tubes. This can be vitrified and stored underground for over 100,000 years or it can be recycled. In that case, fission products would be separated out and safely stored at ground level for the several hundred years needed for them to decay to radioactivity levels similar to that of uranium ore. The long-lived actinides and the remaining fuel go back into the reactor, where they are burned and transmuted into more-stable isotopes.

== Economics ==
The capital cost of the SSR-W was estimated at $1,950/kW USD. For comparison, the capital cost of a modern pulverized coal power station in the United States is $3,250/kW and the cost of large-scale nuclear is $5,500/kW..

This low capital cost results in a levelised cost of electricity (LCOE) of $44.64/MWh USD or less because of the simpler intrinsic safe design of the SSR.
