= Molten Chloride Reactor Experiment =

Experimental molten-salt reactor under construction

- Reactor concept: Molten-salt reactor
- Status: Under construction
- Location: Idaho National Laboratory
- Coordinates: 43°35′35.2″N 112°39′16.8″W

Main parameters of the reactor core
- Fuel (fissile material): HEU
- Fuel state: Liquid
- Neutron energy spectrum: Fast
- Primary control method: B_{4}C control rods
- Primary coolant: NaCl-UCl_{3} circulating fuel
- Outlet temperature: 650 °C

Reactor usage
- Primary use: Experimental
- Power (thermal): 150 kW
- Operator/owner: Southern Company

The Molten Chloride Reactor Experiment (MCRE) is an experimental molten-salt reactor under construction at Idaho National Laboratory (INL). It is planned to generate 150 kW of heat and no electricity, and use a mixture of sodium chloride and uranium chloride as both nuclear fuel and coolant. It is intended to prototype a fast-spectrum molten-salt reactor using chloride salt, instead of the better-studied fluoride salts. Such reactors have attracted attention for their high fuel efficiency, proliferation resistance, and ability to burn nuclear waste as fuel.

The reactor is being built by a consortium led by Southern Company, TerraPower, and Core Power, and funded by the US Department of Energy. It is located at INL's LOTUS test bed, inside the former Zero Power Physics Reactor. MCRE is expected to be the world's first fast-spectrum molten-salt reactor, and is expected to be operational in 2027. Its fuel salt is being produced by INL.

== Design ==
MCRE is designed to generate 150 kW of heat and operate between 600 and 650 °C. As a molten chloride fast reactor (MCFR), it uses molten chloride salt as both its fuel and coolant. Its fuel is a eutectic mixture of sodium chloride and uranium trichloride (67-33 mol%). The uranium is planned to be highly-enriched, containing 93.2% ^{235}U. MCRE is expected to require approximately 1300 kg of fuel salt in total. The reactor also uses a flush salt, composed of a eutectic NaCl-MgCl mixture, to flush out the system during commissioning and decommissioning.

The reactor core consists of a cylindrical vessel containing the molten fuel salt. Fuel circulates upward through the reactor vessel, and enters a centrifugal pump atop the reactor. The pump circulates the salt downward through a pipe loop, where it re-enters the vessel from the bottom. The pump also contains an expansion volume to accommodate thermal expansion of the fuel salt during operation. The piping loop is linked through a drainpipe to the fuel handling system.

MCRE is designed to use four control rods, arranged surrounding the core vessel, as its reactivity control system. Each rod contains neutron-absorbing boron carbide. To reduce neutron leakage from the core, magnesium oxide (MgO) is used as a neutron reflector. MgO bricks are stacked surrounding the core to create the reflector assembly. The core and reflector are encased with insulation, with heater panels inside. The externally-powered heaters ensure the fuel salt remains liquid during operation. The reactor lacks a primary coolant system, and therefore cannot sustain long-term high-power operation.

MCRE's primary objective is to characterize MCFR behavior, in support of a future demonstration reactor. The experiment is anticipated to run for six months before decommissioning. The data collected from MCRE is expected to guide deployment of commercial and maritime MCFRs.

== History ==
=== Design background ===
Unlike most nuclear reactors, which use solid fuel, molten-salt reactors (MSRs) use nuclear fuel dissolved within a liquid salt. The molten chloride fast reactor (MCFR) is a type of fast-spectrum MSR whose fuel is a chloride salt. Chlorine, especially ^{37}Cl has very favorable nuclear properties for a fast reactor, including low neutron absorption. A molten-salt reactor using chloride salts results in one of the hardest neutron spectra of any fast reactor concept. Its high neutron economy can then be used either to destroy nuclear waste or as an efficient breeder reactor. As with other MSRs, MCFRs feature low-pressure operation, online refueling, and a large negative temperature coefficient of reactivity. However, chlorine is largely transparent to neutrons, requiring a large neutron reflector. It is also less chemically stable than fluoride salts, which causes issues with corrosion.

Thermal-spectrum molten-salt breeder reactors using the thorium fuel cycle use fuel salt with a very small (~2%) fissile fuel fraction. This results in high sensitivity to fission products. Thus, they require online reprocessing to prevent buildup in the fuel salt. Online reprocessing including separation of ^{233}Pa is also frequently required for breeding, and they must use fluoride salts. In contrast, many chlorides allow significantly higher fissile fractions, which in a fast reactor results in little sensitivity to fission products. MCFRs therefore can be excellent breeders using either uranium-plutonium or thorium-uranium fuel cycles. Alternatively, an MCFR can operate in a "breed-and-burn" configuration, where depleted uranium is used as the feed material but fuel is not reprocessed.

Research on chloride salts for MSRs occurred during the Aircraft Nuclear Propulsion program, and the civilian MSR program at Oak Ridge National Laboratory. However, the graphite-moderated molten salt breeder reactor using a thorium fuel cycle was chosen instead, due to its low fissile inventory and subsequent low doubling time. As a result, relatively little experimental data has been collected for chlorides compared to fluorides. More recently, the MCFR has attracted attention due to its breed-and-burn fuel cycle. Such a configuration allows for very high fuel efficiency without requiring uranium enrichment or reprocessing, which are considered proliferation risks.

=== Planning ===
Southern Company is part of a public-private partnership with TerraPower, UK-based Core Power, the US Department of Energy (DOE), and several other collaborators aiming to commercialize the molten chloride fast reactor. In 2016, the Department of Energy awarded a $68 million cost-sharing agreement, under its Advanced Reactor Competition program, to support development of the MCFR.

Funded by the DOE under an Advanced Reactor Concepts (ARC-15) award, the consortium constructed an integral effects test (IET) system at TerraPower's facility in Everett, Washington. The IET, using chloride salt without any nuclear material, entered operation in 2023. The IET is a non-nuclear salt loop, using external heaters supplying 1 MW of heat. It was intended to inform the design of a 180 MW demonstration MCFR.

=== Construction ===
In 2020, Southern Company was selected under the Advanced Reactor Demonstration Program's (ARDP) risk reduction pathway to design, construct, and operate the Molten Chloride Reactor Experiment (MCRE, pronounced "McCree"). The risk reduction pathway was created to finance projects that could be licensed and deployed within 10 to 14 years. In November 2021, Southern Company and the DOE announced a cooperative agreement to construct and operate MCRE at Idaho National Laboratory (INL). The project is supported by a five-year $170 million cost-sharing agreement under the ARDP. MCRE is expected to be the first molten chloride salt-fueled reactor.

MCRE is planned to be DOE-authorized and is sited inside the Laboratory for Operation and Testing in the United States (LOTUS) test bed. LOTUS is a test facility for advanced reactor demonstration projects, and comprises the reactor cell area of the Zero Power Physics Reactor (ZPPR), which was closed in 1992. The test bed is intended for microreactors up to 500 kW. LOTUS is capable of handling fuels that require enhanced security. The final environmental assessment and finding of no significant impact for MCRE was issued by the DOE in August 2023.

In support of MCRE, INL constructed a Molten Salt Flow Loop Test Bed. The test loop uses 4.5 kg of lithium chloride and potassium chloride mixture, plus an inert cover gas. It was built to monitor corrosion and instrument performance in hot chloride salt, and entered operation in 2025.

MCRE is expected to be the first fast-spectrum molten-salt reactor, and the first fast-spectrum circulating-fuel reactor. On October 14, 2026, Southern Company and Core Power announced the DOE's approval of cost-sharing under ARDP for the final stage of the project. According to the announcement, MCRE is expected to achieve criticality in 2027.

=== Fuel production ===
Production of the NaCl–UCl_{3} fuel salt for MCRE began in 2020. The HEU for MCRE is sourced from fuel plates left over from the ZPPR. However, early attempts experienced issues with incomplete conversion. A technical breakthrough in 2024 allowed for faster production. By 2025, INL claimed it could produce one batch in a single day.

In December 2025, the DOE announced that it had finished the first batch of fuel for MCRE. The reactor is expected to require 72 to 75 such batches in total. According to INL, MCRE represents the largest fuel production effort at the laboratory since the Experimental Breeder Reactor II more than 30 years prior. In 2023, a test sample of chloride salt fuel similar to MCRE was irradiated in INL's Neutron Radiography Reactor (NRAD).
