= Thorium fluoride =

Thorium fluoride may refer to:

- Thorium(III) fluoride (thorium trifluoride), ThF_{3}
- Thorium(IV) fluoride (thorium tetrafluoride), ThF_{4}

== See also ==
- Thorium oxyfluoride, ThOF_{2}
