= Saltfoss Energy =

Danish small molten salt reactor startup

Saltfoss Energy ApS
- Formerly: Seaborg Technologies
- Type: Private
- Industry: Nuclear power
- Founded: 2015; 11 years ago
- Headquarters: Copenhagen, Denmark
- Products: Neutronics; Molten salt reactors
- Number of employees: >100 (2022)
- Website: saltfoss.com

Saltfoss Energy ApS is a private Danish startup. It is developing small molten salt reactors. Founded in 2015 and based in Copenhagen, Denmark, Saltfoss emerged as a small team of physicists, chemists, and engineers with educational roots at the Niels Bohr Institute, CERN, ESS (European Spallation Source) and DTU (Technical University of Denmark) who share a common vision of safe, sustainable and cheap nuclear power.

In April 2025 Seaborg Technologies changed its name to Saltfoss Energy, reflecting the company’s flowing molten salt technology. In Old Norse, the word “foss” is used to describe a powerful waterfall.

== Compact Molten Salt Reactor ==
The reactor designed by Saltfoss Energy is called the Compact Molten Salt Reactor (CMSR). The company claims that it is inherently safe, significantly smaller, better for the environment, and inexpensive even compared to fossil fuel-based electricity.

Conventional nuclear reactors have solid fuel rods that need constant cooling, typically using water under high pressure. Water is abundantly available but its low boiling point is a vulnerability creating a potential point of failure. In contrast, in a CMSR, fuel is mixed in a liquid salt whose boiling point is far above the temperatures produced by the fission products. This enables it to operate stably at a pressure of one atmosphere.

Unlike other thermal spectrum molten salt reactors the CMSR was originally planned to not use graphite as a moderator. Instead it would have used molten Sodium hydroxide (NaOH) contained in pipes adjacent to and interlaced with pipes that contain the molten fuel salt. This enabled a more compact design. It also allowed the liquid moderator to be rapidly removed from the core as a fission control mechanism. In early 2023 however, Saltfoss Energy made the decision to switch at least the first generation of developed reactors to Low-Enriched Uranium (LEU), instead of the originally planned High-Assay-Low-Enriched Uranium (HALEU) due to potential issues with HALEU supply, which did not meet their desired timeline for the CMSR. This involved switching the moderator to graphite from NaOH as well.

In the case of an overheating accident, a frozen salt plug at the base of the reactor melts and the liquid fuel flows out of the reactor core away from the moderator into cooled tanks where the reaction quenches, the fuel cools and solidifies, without dispersing in the surrounding environment.

The approach mitigates the danger of a failure rather than eliminating all failures.

== Deployment ==
The company intends to deploy its shipping container sized reactors on barges. Reactors are manufactured at scale in a central facility, reducing costs. Using barges makes them mobile. Single reactor output is estimated to be 100 MWe. Multiple units could be deployed on a single barge.

The primary design challenge is in preventing the highly corrosive fuel slurry and moderator from damaging the reactor.

The fueling cycle is 12 years. It offers no proliferation risk or military applications.

Saltfoss Energy hopes to deliver the first power barge in the first half of 2030.
