= Kairos Power =

American nuclear energy company

Kairos Power LLC
- Type: Private
- Industry: Nuclear energy
- Founded: 2016; 10 years ago
- Founders: Mike Laufer; Edward Blandford; Per Peterson
- Headquarters: Alameda, California, US
- Area served: United States of America
- Products: Nuclear reactors
- Website: kairospower.com

Kairos Power LLC is an American nuclear energy company founded in 2016 that is developing fluoride salt-cooled high-temperature reactors (FHRs), a type of molten-salt reactor, in a small modular reactor (SMR) form factor.

== History ==
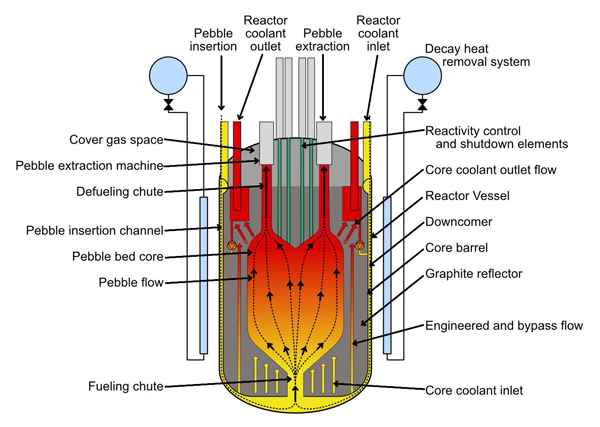
Kairos Power's design for a fluoride salt-cooled high temperature reactor (FHR) using Triso-coated particle fuel in a pebble bed configuration

Kairos Power was founded in 2016 and is attempting to design and construct small modular reactors (SMRs), which are hoped to be faster to build and less expensive than current nuclear power plants. The company has designed a fluoride salt-cooled high-temperature reactor, called KP-FHR, using ceramic-coated tri-structural isotropic (TRISO) pebble fuel and low-pressure molten fluoride salt as coolant, as opposed to the metal-oxide fuel with water used for neutron moderation and coolant as is the case in conventional pressurized water reactors or boiling water reactors.

The company's ultimate goal is to deploy commercial power plants featuring 75-megawatt reactors deployed in pairs.

As of January 2026, the NRC has approved 14 topical reports submitted by Kairos Power to support licensing KP-FHR reactors, with another under review.

=== Hermes ===
In 2021, Kairos applied for a construction permit from the Nuclear Regulatory Commission (NRC) to build their Hermes Low-Power Demonstration Reactor (Hermes), a fluoride salt-cooled high-temperature (FHR) reactor, designed to produce 35 MW_{th}. The application was approved in 2023 for the $100 million reactor project to be built in the East Tennessee Technology Park campus in Oak Ridge, Tennessee. Kairos broke ground on the site in July 2024, and nuclear construction began in May 2025.

As of February 2026, Kairos is preparing to submit an operating license application for the Hermes reactor.

=== Hermes 2 ===
In 2023, Kairos submitted a construction permit application for their Hermes 2 Demonstration Plant (2 x 35 MW_{th}), also intended to be located in Oak Ridge, in July 2023. However, after signing a power purchase agreement with Google, the company changed the plant to a power output of 50 MW_{e}, to be integrated with the Tennessee Valley Authority (TVA) grid. This application was approved in November 2024, and Kairos broke ground on the site in April 2026.

=== Power purchase agreements ===
In 2024, Kairos Power signed an agreement with Google to supply 500 MW of electricity, from six to seven small nuclear reactors, for Google's data centers. The first is scheduled to be completed by 2030, with the remainder by 2035. The plans are pending approval by the US Nuclear Regulatory Commission as well as local agencies.

In August 2025, Kairos Power, Google, and the TVA announced a power purchase agreement (PPA) in which Kairos Power’s Hermes 2 reactor will deliver 50 MW of energy to the TVA grid to help power Google’s data centers in Jackson County, Alabama and Montgomery County, Tennessee. The agreement made TVA the first U.S. utility to sign a PPA with an advanced nuclear plant. Hermes 2 is expected to start providing power to the grid in 2030 and will be the first deployment under Kairos Power’s 2024 agreement with Google.

=== Strategic Partnerships ===
In February 2026, the Department of Energy's Oak Ridge National Laboratory (ORNL) and Kairos Power announced a new $27 million strategic partnership to accelerate advanced nuclear technology and advance U.S. clean energy goals. Under the partnership, ORNL would provide access to its specialized facilities and manufacturing capabilities and would evaluate the performance of coated particle fuel under irradiation. This work is intended to support the Hermes reactor series and future Kairos Power deployments.

In September 2025, Kairos Power and BWX Technologies, Inc. (NYSE: BWXT) announced a collaborative agreement to explore opportunities to optimize commercial TRISO nuclear fuel production to supply Kairos Power's future fleet and other potential customers. The joint team would explore ways to use Kairos Power's TRISO Development Laboratory (TDL) at its Albuquerque campus as well as BWXT's facilities to optimize TRISO manufacturing and process automation.

== KP-FHR Technology ==
The company's KP-FHR reactors are built using prefabricated components, including precast concrete shielding and a seismically isolated foundation, which the company hopes will lower project costs. Future KP-FHR reactors are expected to produce 75 MW_{e} each.

=== Molten Salt Coolant ===
The Fluoride Salt-Cooled High Temperature Reactor (FHR) Kairos is developing uses the same type of coolant that was first demonstrated in the Molten Salt Reactor Experiment of the 1960s at Oak Ridge National Laboratory – a mixture of lithium fluoride and beryllium fluoride known as FLiBe. Fluoride is known to protect metals from the salt's corrosiveness at higher temperatures.

In 2022, Kairos announced the commissioning of its Molten Salt Purification Plant (MSPP), based at the Materion campus in Elmore, Ohio, to produce plant-scale quantities of high-purity FLiBe for Kairos' non-nuclear engineering test units, Hermes demonstration reactor, and future KP-FHR iterations. The facility will scale up a chemical process for Flibe production developed in Kairos Power's labs.

=== TRISO Fuel ===
Unlike other MSRs, Kairos Power's reactor uses solid fuel. TRISO particles are encased in annular graphite fuel pebbles that are buoyant in the molten salt coolant. The pebble bed design enables online refueling, allowing fresh fuel to be added and used fuel to be removed without shutting down the reactor. The pebbles will circulate continuously, with each pebble traversing the core multiple times. TRISO particles cannot melt in a reactor and can withstand extreme temperatures that are well beyond the threshold of current nuclear fuels. TRISO has been described by the U.S. Department of Energy as "the most robust nuclear fuel on earth."

In January 2026, the U.S. Department of Energy finalized a contract to provide high-assay low-enriched uranium (HALEU) to Kairos Power. The company will use this first allocation of HALEU to fuel the Hermes 1 reactor. HALEU, which is uranium enriched between 5% and 20% uranium-235, is required for fueling many advanced reactor designs.

== Funding and Investment ==
In 2020, Kairos Power received a $630 million, seven year Technology Investment Agreement with the U.S. Department of Energy as part of the DOE's Advanced Reactor Demonstration Program.
