= Dual fluid reactor =

German nuclear reactor design proposal with liquid metal cooling loops

The Dual Fluid Reactor is a reactor concept of the Canadian company Dual Fluid Energy Inc. It combines techniques from molten salt reactors (MSR) and liquid metal cooled reactors. In contrast to classical molten salt reactor designs, the Dual Fluid Reactor employs a liquid metallic actinide mixture fuel, while the coolant is provided by a separate liquid metal loop, typically using molten lead. It is intended to reach the criteria for reactors of the Generation IV International Forum. The Dual Fluid Reactor is classified by its developers as the first Generation V nuclear reactor, characterized by the physical separation of liquid metallic fuel and coolant and by the provision for continuous fuel processing beyond Generation IV reactor concepts.

== Design ==
The fuel can be a molten solution of actinide chloride salts, or it can be pure liquid actinide metal. Cooling is provided by molten lead in a separate loop. It is a fast breeder reactor, and can use both uranium and thorium to breed fissile material, as well as recycle processed high-level waste and plutonium.

The reactor is inherently safe, because decay heat can be removed passively. This takes advantage of the high thermal conductivity of the molten metal.

U-238 of a spent nuclear fuel element of a light water reactor can be dissolved in Chlorine-salt, including long-living transuranic isotopes. Breeding and fission could power a 300MW electrical Dual Fluid Reactor for about 25 years. The initial fuel would be completely converted into fission products with radiotoxicity reduced from a hundreds of thousands of years to a few hundred years. This essentially eliminates the need for problematic long term storage.

For the DF-300 (300 MW) design variant, projected levelized electricity costs of approximately 2.7 US cents per kilowatt-hour are reported by the developer, based on modelling assumptions including high fuel utilisation and simplified plant design.

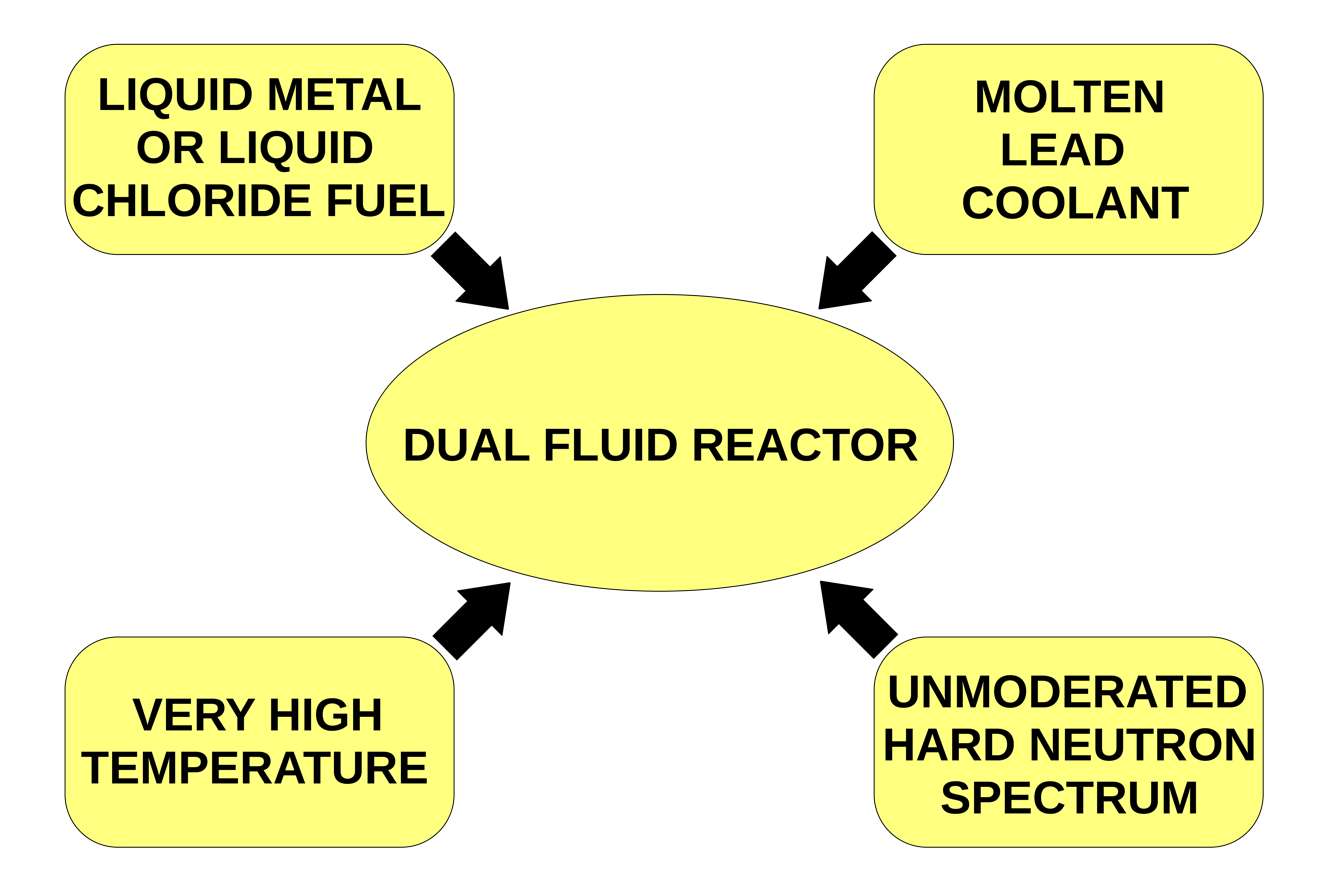

== History ==
A conceptual predecessor of the Dual Fluid Reactor was the UK 1970s lead-cooled fast spectrum molten salt reactor (MSFR), which dissolved the fissile fuel in a molten salt, with experimental work undertaken over 1968-73, before it lost funding.

The Dual Fluid Reactor was initially developed by a German research institute, the Institute for Solid-State Nuclear Physics in Berlin, led by Armin Huke and Götz Ruprecht.

In 2015, a design fueled by undiluted actinide trichloride based on isotope-purified Cl-37, circulating at an operating temperature of 1000 °C. It used lead as coolant.

In February 2021, the six German inventors, along with the existing team, formed Canadian company Dual Fluid Energy Inc. to commercialize the design. In June 2021, the company secured over $6 million in Canadian seed funding.

One patent has been obtained, and another is pending on the liquid metal fuel variant.

The reactor design won the public vote for the Galileo Knowledge Prize in the German GreenTec Awards of 2013, although the award committee presiding over the awards changed the rules to exclude nuclear designs before announcing the winner. Dual Fluid participants successfully sued to remedy this.

In 2023 the company signed a deal signed with the Rwanda Atomic Energy Board (RAEB) to build a demonstrator reactor. The reactor is expected to be complete by 2026 and complete testing by 2028.
