= Thorium trifluoride =

Names
- Other names Thorium(III) fluoride

Identifiers
| CAS Number | 13842-84-7 |
| 3D model (JSmol) | Interactive image |
| ChemSpider | 123139 |
| PubChem CID | 139625 |
| CompTox Dashboard (EPA) | DTXSID80160671 |
- InChI: InChI=1S/3FH.Th/h3*1H;/q;;;+3/p-3 Key: NFUSRTKFVSVVEC-UHFFFAOYSA-K
- SMILES: F[Th](F)F

Properties
| Chemical formula | F_{3}Th |
| Molar mass | 289.0329 g·mol^{−1} |

Related compounds
| Related compounds | Americium trifluoride |
- Except where otherwise noted, data are given for materials in their standard state (at 25 °C [77 °F], 100 kPa). Infobox references

Thorium trifluoride is a binary inorganic compound of thorium metal and fluorine with the chemical formula ThF_{3}.

== Synthesis ==
Thorium trifluoride is not formed in a reaction of thorium metal with thorium tetrafluoride: Molecules of ThF_{3} have been prepared by reacting atomic thorium with fluorine gas, and condensation onto a solid inert gas matrix. A solid phase is not known.

2 Th + 3 F_{2} → 2 ThF_{3}
