= Fuel temperature coefficient of reactivity =

Measure of nuclear reactor fuel stability

Fuel temperature coefficient of reactivity is the change in reactivity of the nuclear fuel per degree change in the fuel temperature. It is a measure of the stability of the reactor operations (that is, its value is normally negative). This temperature coefficient is also known as the Doppler coefficient due to the contribution of Doppler broadening, which is the dominant contribution to the effect. The American Nuclear Society defines the term as the "Doppler temperature coefficient of reactivity" (DTC). Because the fuel temperature responds to changes in reactor power much faster than the coolant or moderator temperature does, the coefficient is also called the prompt temperature coefficient; a negative fuel temperature coefficient is generally considered more important for safety than a negative moderator temperature coefficient.

A reactor with a negative fuel temperature coefficient is inherently stable: a rise in temperature lowers the reactivity and the power, tending to return the reactor to its original state, while a positive coefficient drives power excursions that can be stopped only by outside intervention.

== Contributing effects ==
=== Doppler broadening ===
The thermal motion of atoms within the fuel broadens the neutron capture cross-section resonances of the non-fissile portions of the fuel, notably uranium-238 and plutonium-240. The area under a resonance curve is essentially constant, so the broadened peak produces less flux depression (self-shielding) at the resonance center while increasing the energy-integrated absorption rate (the resonance integral); the resonance escape probability therefore decreases and the effective multiplication factor falls. In light-water reactor cores the effect occurs predominantly in uranium-238 resonances, so any increase in fuel temperature produces a prompt negative reactivity feedback, an important self-regulating and inherently safe feedback mechanism. The response is fast: it takes only a few milliseconds for the fuel temperature to rise enough to change the absorption in the uranium-238 resonances, with time frames as short as 10^{−4} seconds, which is why the coefficient is called prompt.

=== Thermal expansion ===
Thermal expansion of the fuel at higher temperatures results in a lower density which reduces the likelihood of a neutron interacting with the fuel. In light-water reactors with ceramic uranium dioxide fuel this effect is relatively insignificant and the Doppler contribution dominates; in fast reactors with metallic fuel, fuel expansion provides a significant additional negative reactivity effect.

== Sign and magnitude ==
The fuel temperature coefficient is negative in most thermal reactors, and the Doppler broadening contribution accounts for the dominant part of it, making a substantial contribution in fast reactors as well. For thermal water reactors with uranium-235-fueled cores the coefficient typically ranges from −1.0×10^{−5} to −5.0×10^{−5} per kelvin; a modern 9×9 boiling water reactor fuel assembly has a value of about −1.7×10^{−5} per kelvin.

== See also ==
- Nuclear fission
- Nuclear reactor physics
- Void coefficient
