= Pohick =

Pohick is a toponym in Northern Virginia derived from the Algonquian (Pohick language) word for the "water place." It can refer to:

- Pohick (tribe), historical Algonquian-speaking tribe, part of Powhatan Confederacy
- Pohick language, part of Algonquian family
- Pohick Bay
- Pohick Church
- Pohick Creek
- Pohick Road
- Pohick, Virginia
- Pohick, West Virginia
