= Project Pele =

US deployable nuclear reactor project

Project Pele is a project of the US Department of Defense (DOD) to build a mobile nuclear reactor for use at remote military bases. Named for the Hawaiian goddess Pele, the project intends to replace fossil fuel-fired generators in remote locations. It was launched after a DOD study identified the energy supply chain as vulnerable to attack or disruption. Project Pele began in 2018, and contracts were awarded to three companies for initial development in 2020. In 2022, BWX Technologies was selected to build the final prototype, and was awarded a $300 million contract. The project broke ground in 2024, and reactor assembly began the following year. As of 2026, the reactor is under construction and is intended to begin power production in 2028.

The prototype reactor will be a high-temperature gas-cooled reactor using TRISO fuel and supplying 1.5 MW of electricity. The reactor core, power conversion system, and other components will be contained in four ISO 20-foot containers. It will be transportable by truck or by C-17 cargo aircraft, and placed behind concrete shields for operation. The reactor is intended to take under three days to set up after delivery, and one week to remove after operation.

== Development ==
The project originated in 2016, in response to a study by the Defense Science Board examining the DOD's requirements for reliable, mobile power. During the wars in Iraq and Afghanistan, approximately 52% of American casualties occurred during land convoy missions, over 80% of which were carrying water or fuel. It was tasked by Congress to examine the energy supply chain, and it produced a report in 2018. In its report, the Defense Science Board identified energy logistics as at-risk, and considered nuclear energy as an idea power source; Project Pele was started the same year.

Jeff Waksman, the program manager, stated that the idea for the project originated with US Indo-Pacific Command, based in Hawaii. According to Waksman, while Pele is a backronym for Portable Energy for Lasting Effects, the project is really named after Pele, the Hawaiian goddess of fire and volcanos. Project Pele is led by the DOD's Strategic Capabilities Office. According to the DOD, the project's goal is to demonstrate a microreactor that can produce reliable electrical power without connection to the commercial power grid.

Plans called for a 1–5 MW_{e} reactor, contained within three or four 20-foot containers and weighing under 40 tons. It was required to be transportable by C-17 cargo aircraft, and capable of operating for up to three years without refueling. The DOD mandated that the reactor should be capable of operating within three days of delivery, and removable within a week of shutdown.

In 2020, BWX Technologies (BWXT), Westinghouse Government Services, and X-energy were each awarded preliminary contracts of less than $15 million. The following year, BWXT and X-energy were down-selected to each develop final designs by 2022. The environmental impact statement (EIS) for the project was released in early 2022. After the EIS was issued, the DOD chose to formally proceed with Project Pele, and selected BWXT's design for construction. The DOD also awarded a one-year contract to X-energy, to continue engineering development of its own design in parallel. In June 2022, the DOD awarded $300 million to BWXT to construct the reactor. The company was contracted to deliver a 1.5 MW_{e} prototype microreactor. Although the original specifications required the reactor to be transportable within a week of shutdown, the EIS allowed for five weeks for transport between locations at INL.

Project Pele broke ground in 2024, with reactor assembly set to begin in 2025. The project is proceeding under Department of Energy (DOE) authorization, rather than a license from the Nuclear Regulatory Commission (NRC), although the NRC's Advisory Committee on Reactor Safeguards has provided input to the project. Construction of the reactor core began in July 2025. The reactor's control module is being built by Northrop Grumman, while the power conversion system is being built by Rolls-Royce at its facility in Indianapolis, Indiana. TRISO fuel for Project Pele was fabricated by BWXT at its facility in Lynchburg, Virginia. The fuel was delivered to INL in December 2025. As of 2025, the reactor was expected to begin producing power in 2028. According to Waksman, the program timeline is intended such that the reactor turns on before the end of the Second Trump Administration, a requirement issued by Pentagon leadership.

== Design ==
Project Pele is a compact, transportable high-temperature gas-cooled reactor, supplying 1.5 MW of electricity. The reactor and support systems will be contained within four ISO 20-foot containers, which will each contain one module: the reactor, the intermediate heat exchanger, the power conversion system, and the control system. The assembled reactor will consist of the four containerized modules, positioned within a concrete shield. The reactor is intended to be inherently safe, and have a smaller exclusion boundary than conventional light-water reactors. While most commercial and naval reactors are water-cooled, water cooling is impractical for a transportable reactor. Instead, a high-temperature, self-contained system like gas or heat pipe cooling is required. Pele will be transportable by truck or by cargo aircraft.

Fuel for Project Pele is TRISO-coated uranium oxycarbide. The enriched uranium fuel is sourced from the DOE, which provided highly-enriched uranium to BWXT, where it was downblended into low-enriched uranium. The project's development also incorporated kinetic impact testing of TRISO fuel.

According to Waksman, Project Pele is not intended to be mass-produced. Instead, the project is intended to demonstrate a portable nuclear power system, and create a clear framework for licensing future commercial or military microreactors. BWXT also plans to leverage Project Pele to advance its commercial BANR microreactor.

== See also ==
- Akademik Lomonosov, a Russian floating power plant with two 32 MWe reactors
- Army Nuclear Power Program (ANPP), a similar US project in the 1960's
  - ML-1, the prototype mobile reactor developed during the ANPP
- List of small modular reactor designs
- Radiant Nuclear
