= Sm-1 =

SM-1 can refer to:

- SM-1, a nuclear reactor
- SM1, a postcode district within the SM postcode area, in Sutton, Greater London
- A surface-to-air missile, RIM-66 Standard (SM-1MR) or RIM-67 Standard (SM-1ER)
- Spider-Man 1, also known as just Spider-Man, the first film in the Spider-Man film series
