= SS Charles H. Cugle =

World War II Liberty ship of the United States

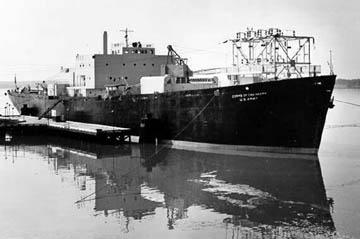
- SS Charles H. Cugle after conversion to nuclear barge Sturgis

History

United States
- Name: Charles H. Cugle
- Namesake: Charles Hurst Cugle
- Builder: J.A. Jones Construction, Panama City, Florida
- Yard number: 105
- Way number: 5
- Laid down: 23 June 1945
- Launched: 13 August 1945
- Completed: 31 August 1945
- Decommissioned: 1977
- Renamed: Sturgis (MH-1A), 1963
- Reclassified: Nuclear Barge
- Fate: In storage prior to disposal

General characteristics (as built)
- Class & type: Type Z-EC2-S-C5 Liberty ship
- Displacement: 14,245 long tons (14,474 t)
- Length: 441 ft 6 in (134.57 m) o/a; 417 ft 9 in (127.33 m) p/p; 427 ft (130 m) w/l
- Beam: 57 ft (17 m)
- Draft: 27 ft 9 in (8.46 m)
- Propulsion: Two oil-fired boilers; Triple-expansion steam engine; 2,500 hp (1,900 kW); Single screw
- Speed: 11 knots (20 km/h; 13 mph)
- Range: 20,000 nmi (37,000 km; 23,000 mi)
- Capacity: 10,856 t (10,685 long tons) deadweight (DWT)
- Crew: 81
- Armament: Stern-mounted 4 in (100 mm) deck gun for use against surfaced submarines, variety of anti-aircraft guns

SS Charles H. Cugle was a Type Z-EC2-S-C5 Liberty ship built by J.A. Jones Construction of Panama City, Florida, launched on 13 August 1945. It was ordered by the War Shipping Administration under Maritime Commission Contract number 3145.

As part of the Army Nuclear Power Program the ship was transferred to the U.S. Army in March 1963, and fitted with a pressurized water reactor, fuelled by used low enriched uranium, designed by Martin Marietta, becoming the world's first floating nuclear power plant, at a cost of $17 million.

Now renamed Sturgis (MH-1A) the reactor began operation on 24 January 1967 at Fort Belvoir, Virginia, generating 10 MWe of electrical power. The reactor barge was then towed to Gatun Lake in the Panama Canal Zone to provide power, owing to a lack of water for the hydroelectric plant. The ship returned to Fort Belvoir in early 1977, and the reactor deactivated and de-fueled. The ship was decontaminated, sealed, and assigned to the James River Reserve Fleet for an expected 50 years of SAFSTOR.

However, 38 years later the Army Corps of Engineers deemed there were low enough levels of radioactivity in the mothballed vessel's contaminated areas for it to be scrapped. It was scheduled to be towed from Virginia to Galveston in April–May 2015 where subcontractor Malin International Ship Repair and Drydock will begin the 12- to 18-month work of removing the contaminated material and placing it in rail cars to be hauled to a hazardous materials disposal site, after which the remaining portions of the vessel will be cut up and sold for scrap value.
