= Lake Braddock =

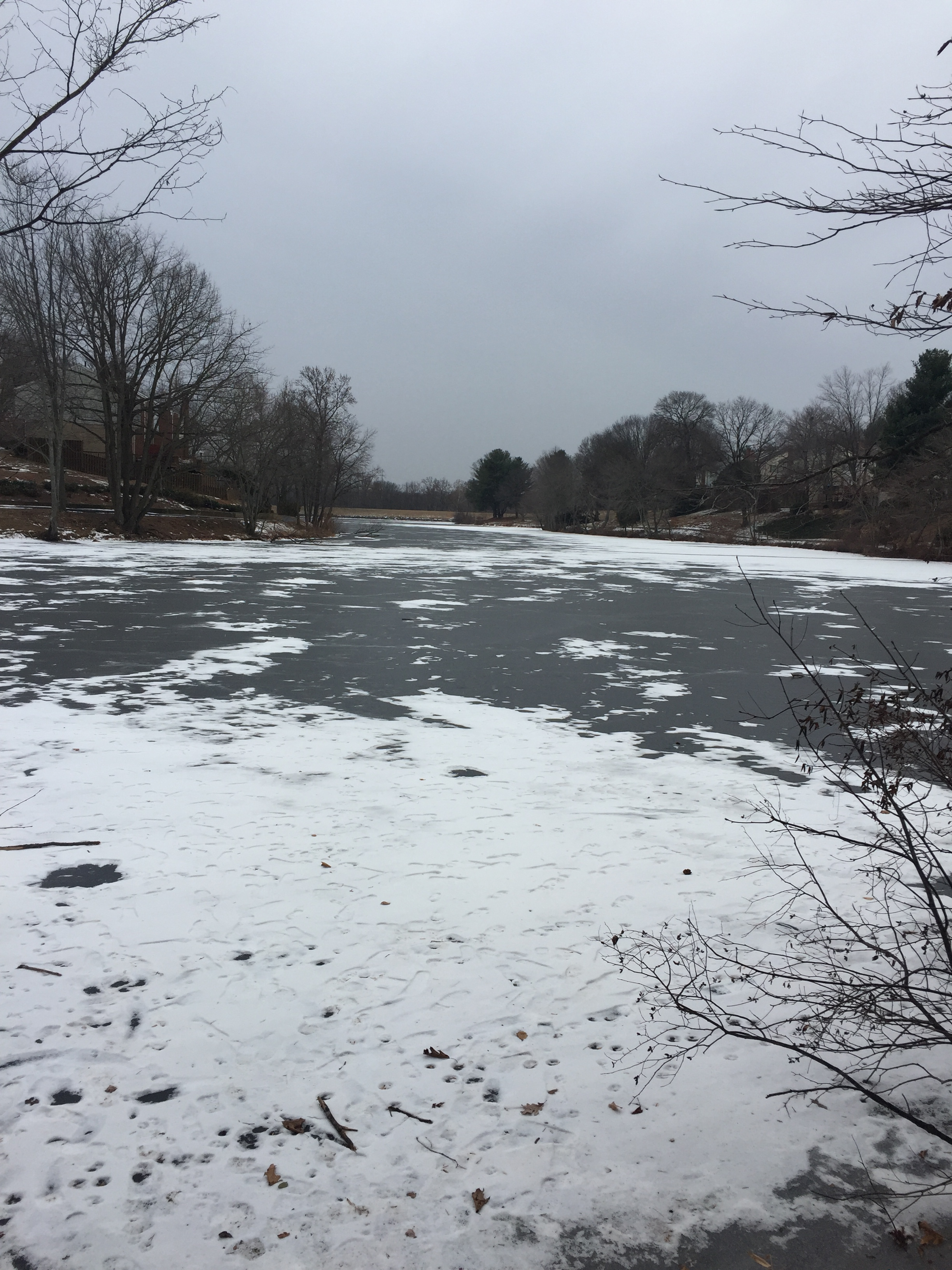
- Lake Braddock in winter

- Location within Virginia Location within the United States
- Location: Fairfax County, Virginia
- Coordinates: 38°48′00″N 77°16′29″W
- Type: reservoir
- Primary inflows: Pohick Creek
- Primary outflows: Pohick Creek
- Basin countries: United States
- Surface area: 19 acres (7.7 ha)
- Surface elevation: 300 ft (90 m)

Lake Braddock is a reservoir in the community of Burke in Fairfax County, Virginia, United States. Lake Braddock is created by an impoundment on a tributary stream of Pohick Creek, itself a tributary of the Potomac River.

In 1969, the Fairfax County Board of Supervisors and the Northern Virginia Soil District signed contracts which allowed the construction of the dam impounding the tributary of the Pohick creek in Burke. The $138,500 cost of the dam, intended as the first of eight to control soil erosion and flooding in the Pohick watershed, was split between the U.S. Department of Agriculture and the Yeonas Development Corporation, the latter of which intended to build a 1000-unit development on the surrounding 400 acres (160 ha).

The ultimate cost of the dam creating the 19 acres (7.7 ha) lake was $93,000 to the U.S. Government and $104,000 to Yeonas.

The fact that the lake included no public recreation facilities despite being financed with public money was the subject of controversy, and led to the amendment of the Watershed Protection and Flood Prevention Act in 1972 to require public access to all such facilities constructed in the future.
