= Pohick Creek =

Stream in Virginia, USA

Pohick Creek Tributary to Potomac River
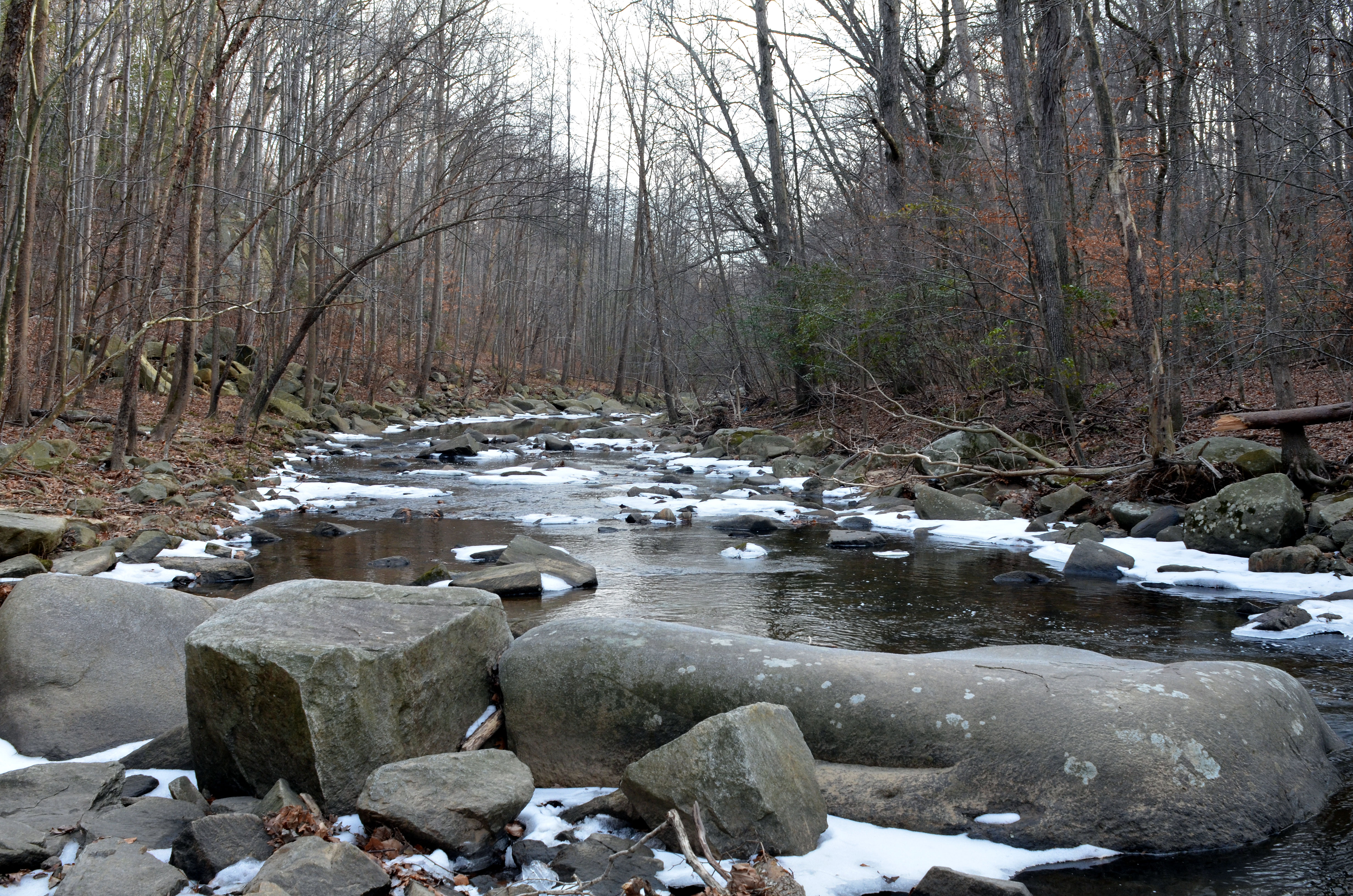

- Location of Pohick Creek mouth Pohick Creek (the United States)

Location
- Country: United States
- State: Virginia
- County: Fairfax

Physical characteristics
- Source: confluence of Rabbit Branch and Sideburn Branch
  - location: Fairfax
  - coordinates: 38°47′52″N 077°17′04″W
  - elevation: 262 ft (80 m)
- Mouth: Potomac River (Pohick Bay)
  - coordinates: 38°41′07″N 077°11′12″W
  - elevation: 0 ft (0 m)
- Length: 14.32 mi (23.05 km)
- Basin size: 32.21 square miles (83.4 km^{2})
- Discharge
  - location: Potomac River (Pohick Bay)
  - average: 41.20 cu ft/s (1.167 m^{3}/s) at mouth with Potomac River

Basin features
- Progression: southeast
- River system: Potomac River
- Tributaries
  - left: Rabbit Branch
  - right: Sideburn Branch; Middle Run; South Run; Rocky Branch
- Bridges: Commonwealth Boulevard, Guinea Road, Burke Lake Road, Old Keene Mill Road, VA 286, Pohick Road, I-95, Lorton Road, US 1, Old Colchester Road

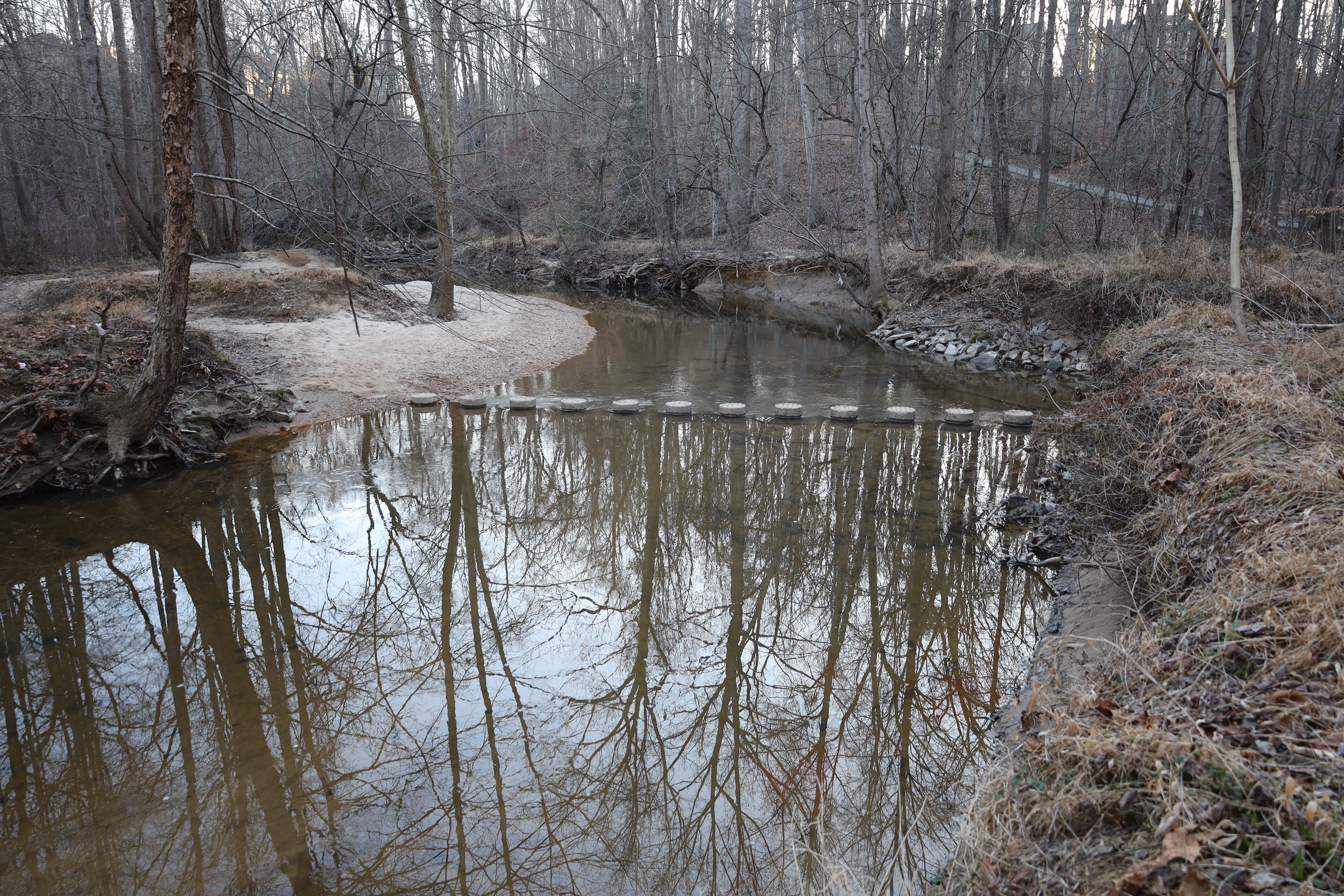
One of many crossings of the Gerry Connolly Cross County Trail over Pohick Creek in Newington, Virginia

Pohick Creek is a 14.0-mile-long (22.5 km) tributary stream of the Potomac River in Fairfax County in the U.S. state of Virginia. It takes its name from the Pohick Native American tribe once prevalent in the area.

Pohick Creek forms in the vicinity of Burke and flows southeast past the western edge of Fort Belvoir to empty into the tidal Pohick Bay, which itself empties, along with Accotink Bay, into Gunston Cove, an embayment of the tidal Potomac River.

Pohick Creek provides Class II and III rapids along a 5.5-mile (8.9 km) stretch between Hooes Road (Virginia Secondary Route 636) and the Richmond Highway (U.S. Route 1) at Lorton.

Several tributaries of the Pohick Creek are impounded by dams constructed under the Watershed Protection and Flood Prevention Act to prevent soil erosion and flooding. Originally eight dams were planned, but from 1970 to 1985, only six were actually built.

- Lake Braddock (Pohick #7) was the first dam built in 1970, and impounds the Pohick Creek in Burke.
- Huntsman Lake (Pohick #8) was built in 1973, and impounds the Middle Run in Springfield.
- Lake Royal (Pohick #4) was completed in 1977, and impounds the Rabbit Branch in Burke above its confluence with the Sideburn Branch, where it forms Pohick Creek.
- Lake Barton (Pohick #2) completed in 1978, impounds a tributary of the Sideburn Branch in Burke.
- Woodglen Lake (Pohick #3), which impounds the Sideburn Branch in Fairfax, was completed in 1981.
- Lake Mercer (Pohick #1) became in 1985 the final dam completed, impounding the South Run in Springfield.

== Variant names ==
The following variant names have been listed on the Geographic Names Information System by the United States Geological Survey.

- North West Branch
- Poehick Creeke
- Poheick Creek
- West Branch

== Course ==
Pohick Creek forms at the confluence of Rabbit Branch and Sideburn Branch in Burke, Virginia. Pohick Creek then flows southeast through West Springfield. After crossing beneath the Fairfax County Parkway, it crosses the Atlantic Seaboard Fall Line near Ridgebrook Drive and Donegal Lane. The Gerry Connolly Cross County Trail follows the creek south of the parkway, crossing it eight times. It then passes into Lorton and crosses Interstate 95, the CSX RF&P Subdivision, and U.S. Route 1. It then meets the Potomac River in Pohick Bay.

Map depicting where Pohick Creek crosses the Atlantic Seaboard Fall Line

== Watershed ==
Pohick Creek drains 32.21 square miles (83.4 km^{2}) of area, receives about 43.5 in/year of precipitation, has a topographic wetness index of 409.88 and is about 31.0% forested.

== See also ==
- Accotink Bay Wildlife Refuge
- List of rivers of Virginia
- Pohick Church
- Pohick, Virginia
- SM-1 closed nuclear power plant on Fort Belvoir
- MH-1A floating nuclear power plant

== Maps ==
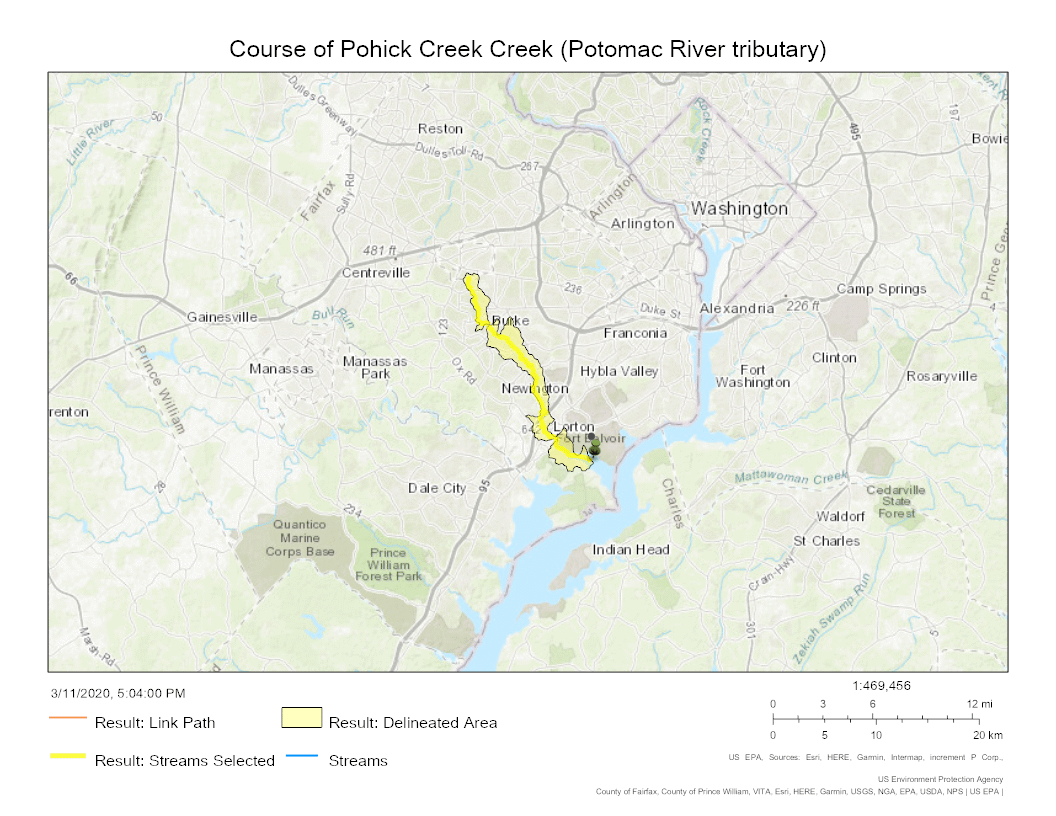
Course of Pohick Creek (Potomac River tributary)

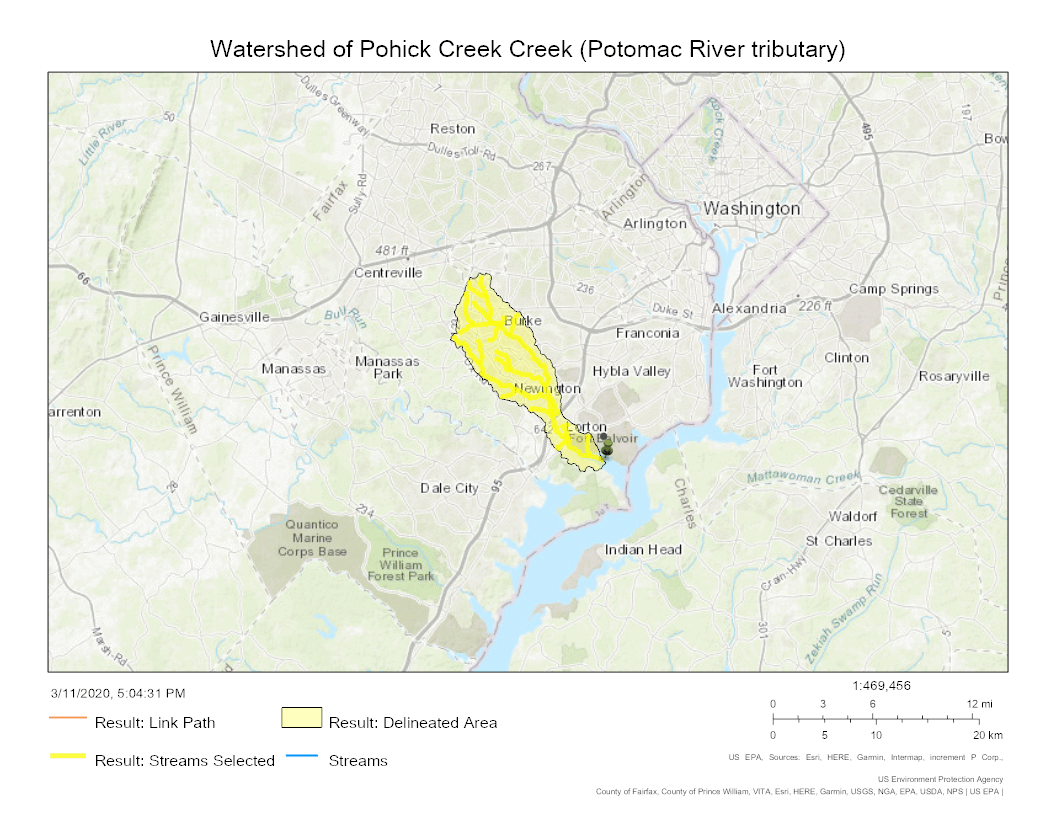
Watershed of Pohick Creek (Potomac River tributary)
