= Army Nuclear Power Program =

Former U.S. Army program

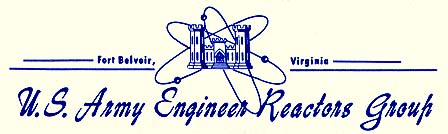
US Army Engineer Reactors Group letterhead

The Army Nuclear Power Program (ANPP) was a program of the United States Army to develop small nuclear reactors to generate electrical and space-heating energy primarily at remote, relatively inaccessible sites. The ANPP tried both pressurized water reactors and boiling water reactors, and had several accomplishments, but ultimately it was considered to be "a solution in search of a problem." The U.S. Army Engineer Reactors Group managed this program and it was headquartered at Fort Belvoir, Virginia. The program began in 1954 as the Army Reactors Branch and had effectively terminated by about 1977, with the last class of NPP operators graduating in 1977. Work continued for some time thereafter either for decommissioning of the plants or placing them into SAFSTOR (long term storage and monitoring before decommissioning). The current development of small modular reactors has led to a renewed interest in military applications, e.g. in Project Pele.

== Background ==
There was interest in the possible application of nuclear power to land-based military needs as early as 1952. A memo from the Secretary of Defense, dated 10 February 1954, assigned the Army the responsibility for "developing nuclear power plants to supply heat and electricity at remote and relatively inaccessible military installations." The Secretary of the Army established the Army Nuclear Power Program and assigned it to the Corps of Engineers.

The Atomic Energy Act of 1954 made the Atomic Energy Commission (AEC) responsible for R&D in the nuclear field, so that the ANPP then became a joint interagency 'activity' of the Department of the Army (DA) and the AEC. When the Atomic Energy Act was revised in 1954, Paragraph 91b authorized the Department of Defense to obtain special nuclear material for use in defense utilization facilities. The focus of the Army Nuclear Power Program was on power production facilities, while the Naval Reactors Program concentrated on nuclear propulsion for submarines and ships. On 9 April 1954, the Chief of Engineers established the US Army Engineer Reactors Group to perform the missions assigned by DA. Essentially, these missions were to:

- conduct R&D, with the AEC, on nuclear power plant development;
- operate the Corps of Engineers nuclear power plants;
- carry out training in support of the plants;
- provide technical support to other agencies as required;
- develop programs for application of nuclear reactors to military needs.

In a Department of the Army Approved Qualitative Materiel Development Objective for Nuclear Power Plants, dated 7 January 1965, these objectives were stated for the program:

- Reduction or elimination of dependence on [fossil] fuel sources.
- Reduction or elimination of logistic burden necessary to support conventional power plants.
- Reliable operation.
- Infrequent refueling and maintenance.
- Reduced crew size, with the ultimate goal of unattended operation.
- Transportability, mobility, and reaction times compatible with the mission or equipment to be supported.
- Improved cost-effectiveness.

The AEC ultimately concluded that the probability of achieving the objectives of the Army Nuclear Power Program in a timely manner and at a reasonable cost was not high enough to justify continued funding of its portion of projects to develop small, stationary, and mobile reactors. Cutbacks in military funding for long-range research and development because of the Vietnam War led the AEC to phase out its support of the program in 1966. The costs of developing and producing compact nuclear power plants were so high that they could be justified only if the reactor had a unique capability and filled a clearly defined objective backed by DOD. After that, the Army's participation in nuclear power plant research and development efforts steadily declined and eventually stopped altogether.

== List of plants ==
Eight plants were constructed. Due to the requirement for a small physical size, all these reactors other than the MH-1A used highly enriched uranium (HEU). The MH-1A had more space to work with, and more weight-carrying capacity, so this was a low-enrichment reactor; i.e., larger and heavier. The MH-1A was briefly considered for use in Vietnam, but the idea of anything nuclear in Vietnam was quickly rejected by the State Department.

The plants are listed in order of their initial criticality. See the gallery of photos in the next section. Sources for this data include the only known book on the ANPP, by Suid, and a DOE document.

Key to the codes:

- First letter: S – stationary, M – mobile, P – portable.
- Second letter: H – high power, M – medium power, L – low power.
- Digit: Sequence number.
- Third letter: A indicates field installation.

Of the eight built, six produced operationally useful power for an extended period. Many of the designs were based on United States Naval reactors, which were proven compact reactor designs.

=== SM-1 ===
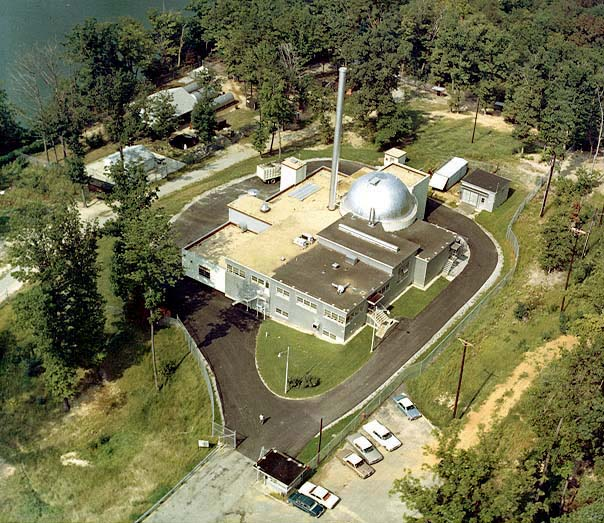
SM-1 Ft. Belvoir Virginia

- SM-1: 2 MW electric. Fort Belvoir, Virginia, Initial criticality April 8, 1957 (several months before the Shippingport Reactor) and the first U.S. nuclear power plant to be connected to an electrical grid. Used primarily for training and testing, rather than power generation for Ft. Belvoir. The plant was designed by the American Locomotive Company (renamed ALCO Products, in 1955), and was the first reactor developed under the Army Nuclear Power Program. See the SM-1 image gallery, below. This plant was a tri-service training facility, with both the US Navy and Air Force sending personnel to be trained on shore-based facilities (the Navy had a different stand-alone program for ship-based nuclear power, which is still in operation). The SM-1 and associated training facilities at Ft. Belvoir were the only training facility for shore-based military power plants. The plant cooled its condensers using the waters of the Potomac River. For about the first 10 years of its operation, the SM-1 unknowingly released tritium into the waters of the Chesapeake Bay, until the development of the Packard Tri-Carb detector, which was the first detector system capable of detecting the low-energy beta decay of tritium. The instrumentation in the SM-1 pre-dated the development of solid-state devices and used vacuum tubes.

=== SL-1 ===
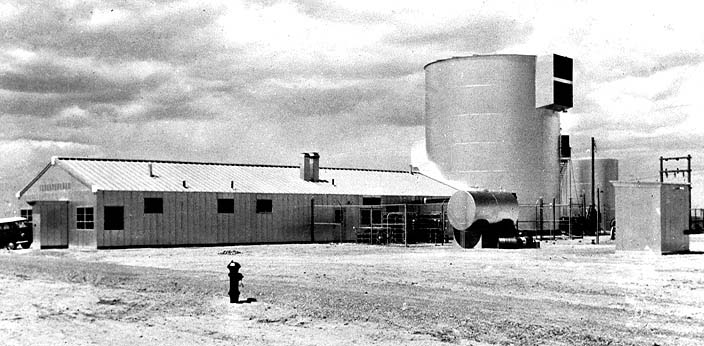
SL-1 NRTS, Idaho

- SL-1: Boiling water reactor, 200 kW electrical, 400 kW thermal for heating, National Reactor Testing Station, Idaho. Initial criticality August 11, 1958. The SL-1 was designed by the Argonne National Laboratory to gain experience in boiling water reactor operations, develop performance characteristics, train military crews, and test components. Combustion Engineering was awarded a contract by the AEC to operate the SL-1 and in turn employed the Army's military operating crew to continue running the plant. This BWR was specifically designed to power DEW line stations.

On January 3, 1961, the reactor was being prepared for restart after a shutdown of eleven days over the holidays. Maintenance procedures were in progress which required the main central control rod to be manually withdrawn a few inches to reconnect it to its drive mechanism; at 9:01 p.m. this rod was suddenly withdrawn too far, causing SL-1 to go prompt critical instantly. In four milliseconds, the heat generated by the resulting enormous power surge caused fuel in the core to explosively vaporize. The nuclear fission reaction directly heated the water, flashing a large amount into steam. Melting aluminum reacted with water producing hydrogen gas. The exploding fuel plates, violent metal-water reaction, and expanding water vapor pressed upwards on the water above the core, sending a pressure wave that struck the top of the reactor vessel. The force impinged on the lid of the reactor vessel, causing water and steam to spray from the top of the vessel. This extreme form of water hammer propelled top head shielding, remnants of fuel plates, five loose shield plugs, a nozzle flange, and the entire reactor vessel upwards. A later investigation concluded that the 26,000-pound (12,000 kg) vessel had jumped 9 feet 1 inch (2.77 m) in the air before striking the overhead bridge crane drive shaft. The vessel settled back into its original location, leaving little evidence of this except scattered debris. The spray of water and steam knocked two operators onto the floor, killing one and severely injuring another. One of the loose shield plugs on top of the reactor vessel impaled the third man through his groin and exited his shoulder, pinning him to the ceiling.The victims were Army Specialists John A. Byrnes (age 27) and Richard Leroy McKinley (age 22), and Navy Seabee Construction Electrician First Class (CE1) Richard C. Legg (age 26).
It was later established that Byrnes (the reactor operator) had lifted the rod and caused the excursion, Legg (the shift supervisor) was standing on top of the reactor vessel and was impaled and pinned to the ceiling, and McKinley, the trainee who stood nearby, was later found alive by rescuers. All three men succumbed to injuries from physical trauma; the radiation from the nuclear excursion would have given the men no chance of survival.
This was the only fatal incident at a US nuclear power reactor, which destroyed the reactor. This incident was important in the development of commercial power because future designs prevented the core from going critical with the removal of a single rod.

=== PM-2A ===
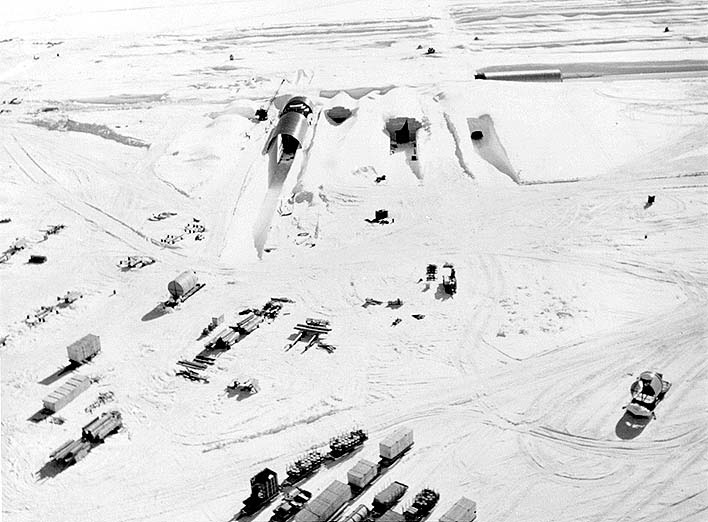
PM-2A Camp Century, Greenland

- PM-2A: 2 MW electric, plus heating. Camp Century, Greenland. Initial criticality October 3, 1960. The first "portable" nuclear power reactor. Brought to Greenland in parts, assembled, operated, disassembled, shipped back to United States. The PM-2A in Camp Century was designed by the American Locomotive Company to demonstrate the ability to assemble a nuclear power plant from prefabricated components in a remote, arctic location. PM-2A operated at a uranium-235 enrichment of 93 percent.

In 1961, after the SL-1 plant explosion, General Alvin Luedecke, the General Manager of the AEC, temporarily prevented the startup of the PM-2A until an interlock could be installed on the central control rod. While the interlock could be operated by personnel, General Luedecke would have to be notified first. The PM-2A was the only reactor besides SL-1 that had a central control rod that could startup the reactor on its own.

We gave explicit instructions on the 8th of January that this reactor, which was shut down at the time, would not be started until we had reviewed the situation. It was necessary for us to issue instructions to modify mechanisms of the PM-2A so that no single rod could be raised to a point where criticality could automatically occur.

PM-2A successfully powered Camp Century for three years. The pressure vessel was also used to investigate neutron embrittlement in carbon steel. This plant was shut down 1963–1964. However despite the reactor's successes, Project Iceworm was never fielded and Camp Century was later abandoned.

=== ML-1 ===
- ML-1: first closed cycle gas turbine. Initial criticality was on March 30, 1961. Designed for 300 kW, but only achieved 140 kW. Operated for only a few hundred hours of testing. The ML-1 was designed by Aerojet General Corporation to test an integrated reactor package that was transportable by military semi-trailers, railroad flatcars, and barges. This reactor was shut down in 1965.

=== PM-1 ===
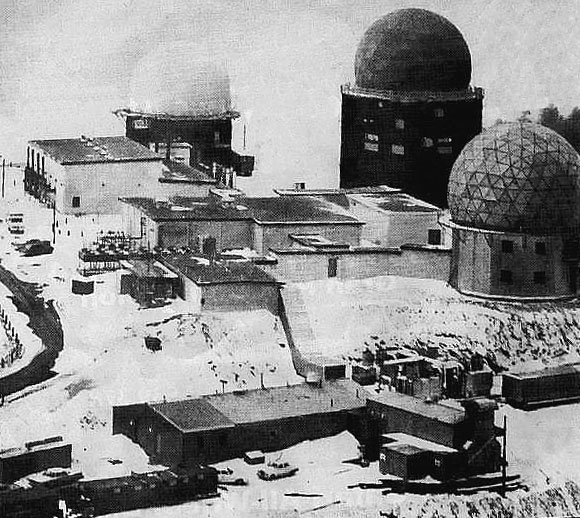
PM-1 Nuclear Power Plant, Sundance Air Force Station

- PM-1: 1.25 MW electric, plus heating. Sundance Air Force Station, Wyoming. Owned by the Air Force, this pressurized water reactor was used to power a radar station. Initial criticality was on February 25, 1962. The PM-1 was designed by the Martin Company and provided electric power to the 731st Radar Squadron of the North American Air Defense Command (NORAD). This plant was shut down in 1968. PM-1 operated at a uranium-235 enrichment of 93 percent.

=== PM-3A ===
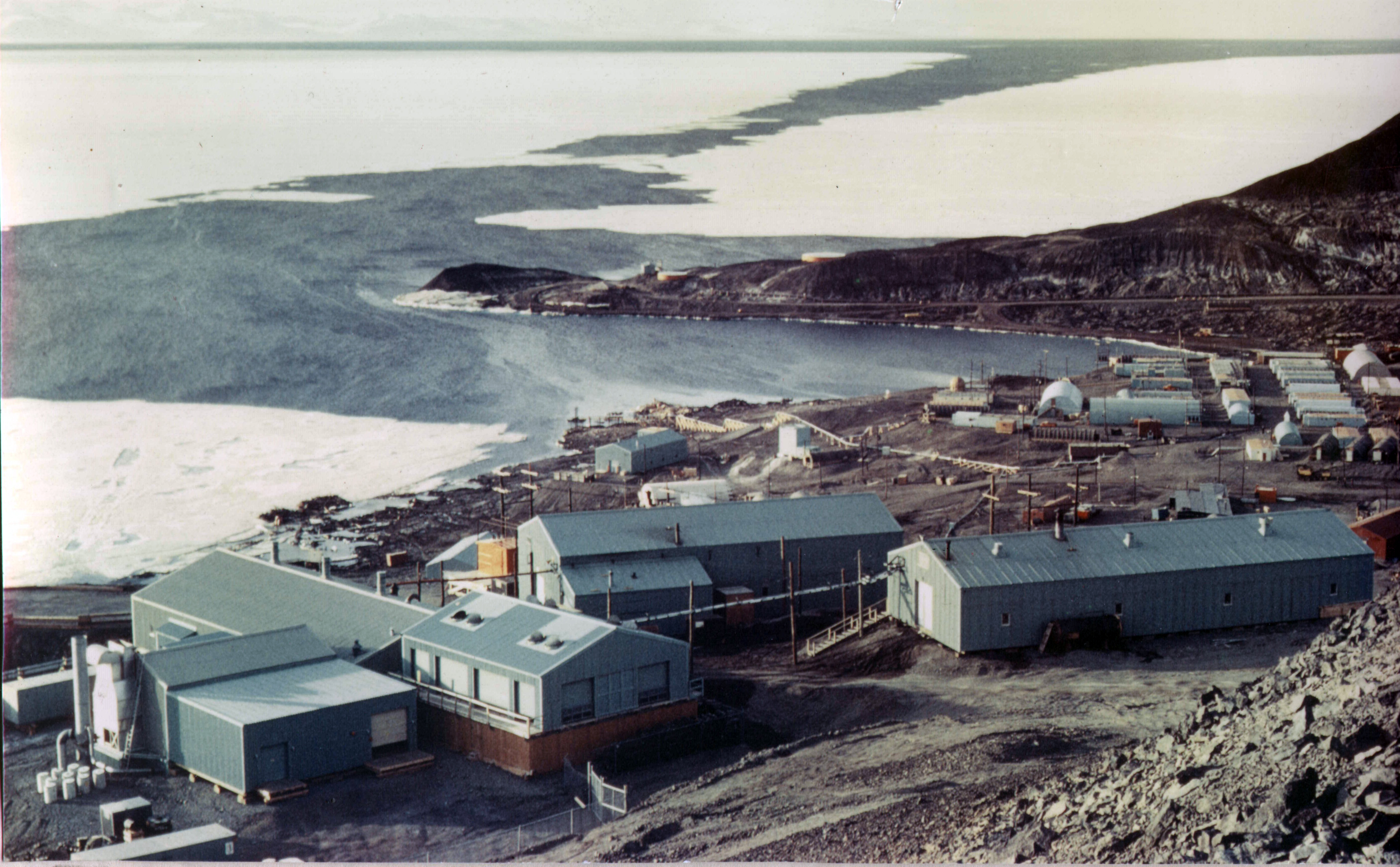
PM-3A McMurdo Station, Antarctica

- PM-3A: 1.75 MW electric, plus heating and desalinization. McMurdo Station, Antarctica. Owned by the Navy. Initial criticality March 3, 1962, decommissioned 1972. The PM-3A, located at McMurdo Sound, Antarctica, was designed by the Martin Company to provide electric power and steam heating to the Naval Air Facility at McMurdo Sound. PM-3A operated at a uranium-235 enrichment of 93 percent.

The PM-3A (Portable, Medium-power, 3rd generation) was a plant installed to provide power for the McMurdo Base in Antarctica. During 1970–1971, it achieved a world-record power run. It was one of the first shore-based power plants to use solid-state equipment. The PM-3A was not operated by the Army, but was under the NAVFAC (Naval Facilities Engineering Command), the shore-based power division of the US Navy. Although the majority of the personnel were Navy, the PM-3A was a tri-service stationing. The plant was air-cooled with the condensers and fan units running glycol. Waste heat was also used for desalination using vacuum flash distillation. The reactor was located in buried tanks in the ground.
The plant suffered from a multitude of problems, including a fire and coolant leakage. It was shut down in September 1972. After decommissioning, the plant was cut into pieces and transported to the US for burial. The soil surrounding the tanks had become radioactive, so it was also removed and transported to Port Hueneme Naval Base, California, where it was incorporated into asphalt pavement.

=== SM-1A ===
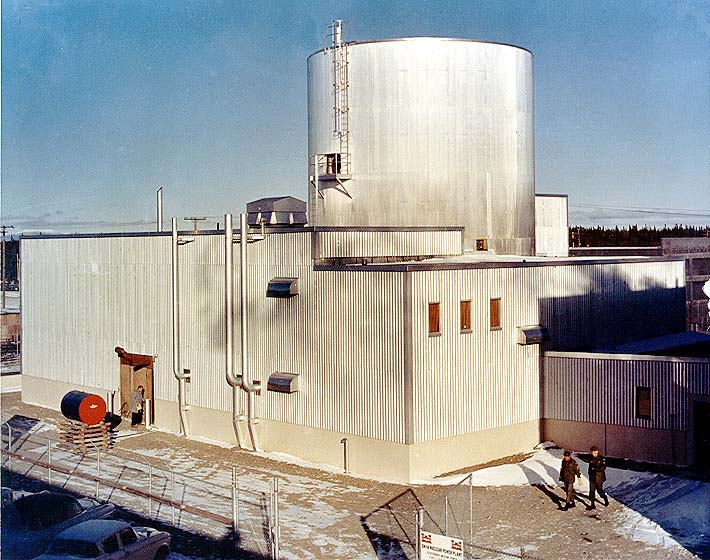
SM-1A Ft. Greely, Alaska

- SM-1A: 2 MW electric, plus heating. Fort Greely, Alaska. Initial criticality March 13, 1962. The SM-1A was designed by ALCO Products and was the first field facility developed under the Army Nuclear Power Program. This site was selected to develop construction methods in a remote, Arctic location, and study its economics compared with fuel oil systems in a remote area. This plant was shut down in 1972. SM-1A operated at a uranium-235 enrichment of 93 percent. In 2022, the Army Corps of Engineers awarded a first stage contract to decommission and dismantle SM-1A, but after a contract appeal allocated it to a different contractor in 2023. Total decommissioning cost was estimated at $243 million.

=== MH-1A ===
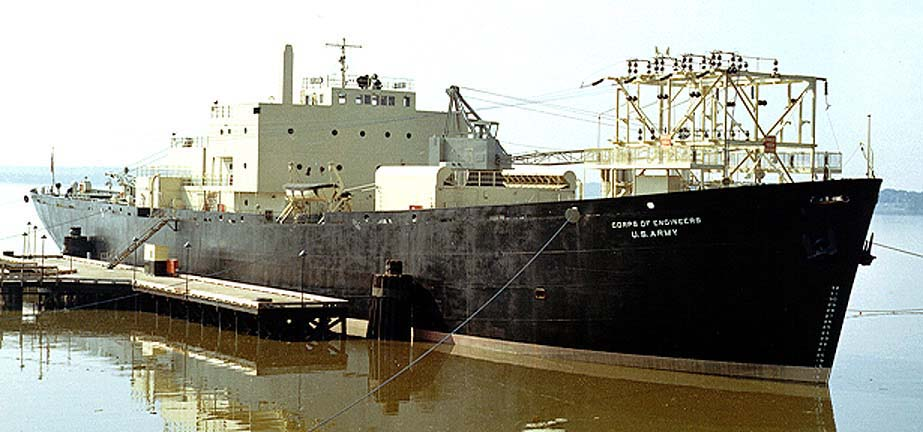
MH-1A Power Barge Sturgis, Gunston Cove, Ft. Belvoir,

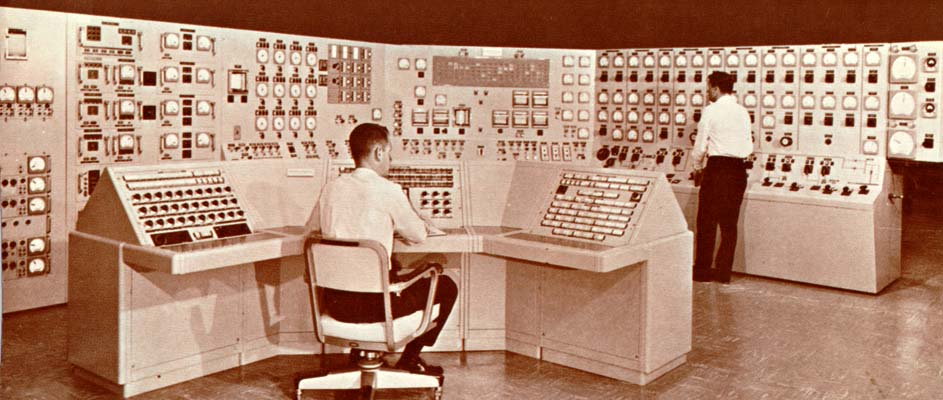
MH-1A control room simulator

- MH-1A: 10 MW electric, plus fresh water supply to the adjacent base. Mounted on the Sturgis, a barge (no propulsion systems) converted from a Liberty ship, and moored in the Panama Canal Zone. Initial criticality at Ft. Belvoir (in Gunston Cove, off the Potomac River), January 24, 1967. It was the last of the eight plants to permanently cease operation. The MH-1A was designed by Martin Marietta Corporation. It remained moored at Gatun Lake in the Panama Canal from 1968 until 1977, when it was towed back to Ft. Belvoir for decommissioning. This reactor used low-enrichment uranium (LEU) in the range of 4 to 7 percent. It was moved to the James River Reserve Fleet in 1978 for SAFSTOR. The MH-1A had an elaborate analog-computer-powered simulator installed at the Training Division, USAERG, Ft. Belvoir. The MH-1A simulator was obtained by Memphis State University Center for Nuclear Studies in the early 1980s, but was never restored or returned to operational service. Its dismantling was completed in March 2019.

=== MM-1 ===
- MM-1: ~2.5 MW electric, Conceptualized but never built. Conceived as the "Military Compact Reactor". A truck mounted liquid metal cooled reactor, with shorter start up and shut down times. Requiring no shielding of Earth or exclusion zones to protect the operators from radiation. With its reactor core containing the energy equivalent of over 8 million pounds of gasoline. Envisioned to have higher power density; its power output meant for the first time the powerplant would weigh less than a diesel generator of comparable output. While initially meant to power bases and field operations, the program was shifted to the Army's "Energy Depot Concept" to investigate the production of synthetic fuels. The reactor and associated trailers would produce liquid fuels for tanks, trucks, armored personnel carriers, and aircraft and drastically reduce the vulnerable petroleum logistical supply chain. The associated trailers would use chemical conversion processes to convert the reactor's waste heat energy into useful fuels using elements universally found in air and water (hydrogen, oxygen, nitrogen and carbon), potentially producing methanol, liquid hydrogen and/or ammonia.

== Timeline ==
SM-1
SM-1A
SL-1
PM-1
PM-2A
PM-3A
MH-1A
ML-1
│
1954
│
1955
│
1956
│
1957
│
1958
│
1959
│
1960
│
1961
│
1962
│
1963
│
1964
│
1965
│
1966
│
1967
│
1968
│
1969
│
1970
│
1971
│
1972
│
1973
│
1974
│
1975
Initial criticality to shutdown (approximate)

== Significant accomplishments ==
References for this list include the DOE document, the Suid book, and the Briefing Book.

- Detailed designs for pressurized and boiling water reactors, as well as gas-cooled and liquid-metal cooled reactors.
- First nuclear power plant with a containment structure (SM-1)
- First use of stainless steel for fuel element cladding (SM-1)
- First nuclear power plant in the US to supply electrical power to a commercial grid (SM-1)
- First in-place reactor vessel annealing, using nuclear heat source, in the US (SM-1A)
- First steam generator replacement in US (SM-1A)
- First pressure-suppression containment (SM-1A)
- First operational boiling-water reactor power plant (SL-1)
- First portable, pre-packaged, modular nuclear power plant to be installed, operated, and removed (PM-2A)
- First use of nuclear power for desalinization (PM-3A)
- First land-transportable, mobile nuclear power plant (ML-1)
- First nuclear-powered closed-loop (Brayton) gas turbine cycle (ML-1)
- First floating (barge-mounted) nuclear power plant (MH-1A)

== Nuclear power plant operator training ==
The Nuclear Power Plant Operator Course (NPPOC) was conducted at Ft. Belvoir. Applicants for the program were enlisted men who had to commit to serving a minimum of two years after completion of training. The requirements for admission to the NPPOC included aptitude test scores at least as stringent as those required for admission to Officer Candidate School. Over 1,000 Nuclear Power Plant operators were licensed between the years 1958 through 1977. The NPPOC was an intense and academically challenging year-long course.

== See also ==
- Nuclear Reactor Operator Badge
- Nuclear power plant
- List of nuclear reactors
- Aircraft Nuclear Propulsion
- Project Pele, a similar US project in the 2020s
