= Nuclear Reactor Operator Badge =

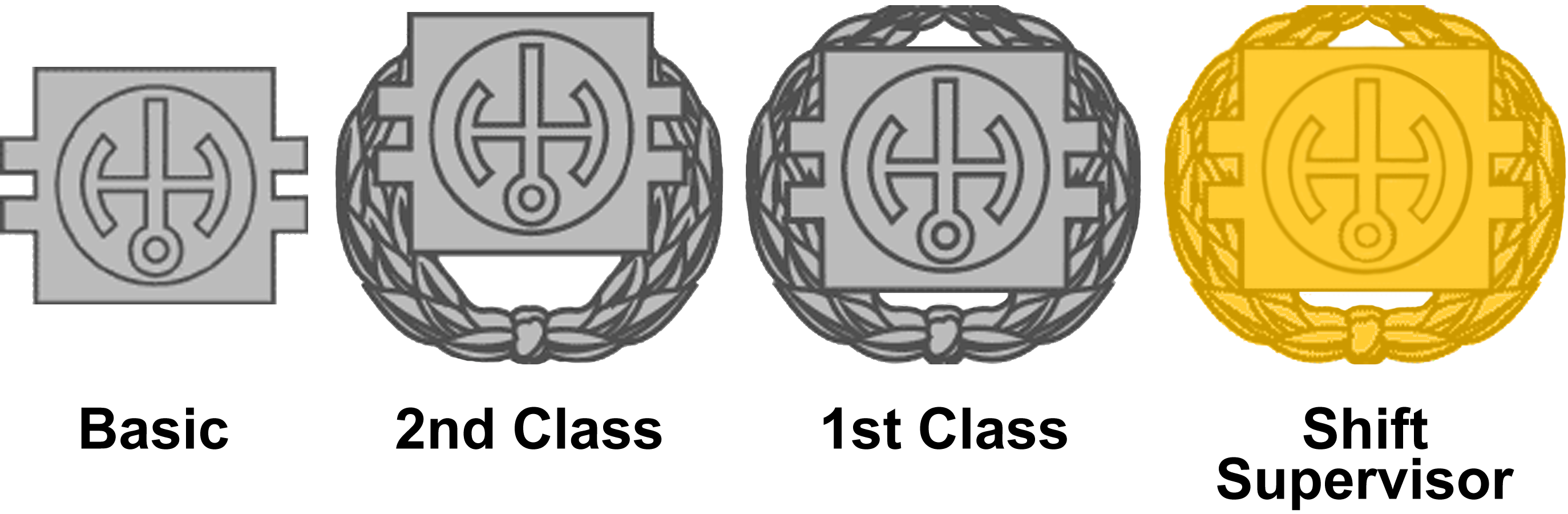
U.S. Army Nuclear Reactor Operator Badges

The Nuclear Reactor Operator Badge is an obsolete qualification badge of the United States Army which was issued between the years of 1965 and 1990. In 1991, the decoration was declared obsolete by Army Regulation 600-8-22, but uniform regulations permit the continued wearing of badges awarded before then. The Nuclear Reactor Operator Badge is worn above the ribbons over the left pocket flap of the Army uniform, in the same position as the Parachutist Badge.

The Nuclear Reactor Operator Badge was first authorized on June 18, 1965. The badge was issued in four degrees; the basic badge was awarded upon completion of the U.S. Army Nuclear Power Plant Operators Course. The Nuclear Reactor Operator Badge was worn on dress uniforms and also on duty uniforms in a subdued version. Miniature Nuclear Reactor Operator Badges were authorized for wear on dinner dress attire.

== Badge design ==
The square (cube) is used to represent a nuclear reactor, the two bars representing control rods and thus alluding to nuclear reactor operations. The disc is symbolic of completeness and refers to the knowledge and training required of all nuclear reactor operators. The disc is also a symbol of the sun, the source of all energy and power. The symbol of the planet Uranus, from which the term "uranium" is derived, refers to nuclear energy and power. Addition of the laurel wreaths signifies further achievement and qualification. The gold color for the shift supervisor signifies the highest degree of achievement and qualification.

== Qualification criteria ==
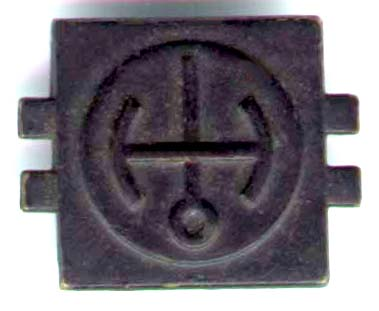
NPPO Basic fatigue badge

This material is transcribed, with a few small edits, from Standard Operating Procedure #1802, US Army Engineer Reactors Group, Ft. Belvoir, VA, dated 1 July 1969. It is clear from these requirements that progression through the various licensing levels was not automatic; that is, there was much more required than simply working a given number of shifts. The first level of qualification was graduation from the Nuclear Power Plant Operator Course; the Basic badge is shown at right.

=== Nuclear power plant operator, second class [Equipment Operator] ===
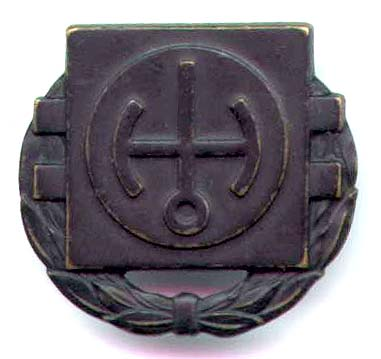
NPPO Second Class fatigue badge

a. Certification as a Nuclear Power Plant Operator [graduation from the US Army Engineer Reactors Group Nuclear Power Plant Operator Course, 52 weeks].

b. Satisfactory completion of an approved training program. Minimum requirements are:

(1) Satisfactory completion of comprehensive practical training and examinations covering all aspects of the operations, maintenance, and plant safety for this level of qualification. An Operations Record will be completed for each trainee.

(2) Completion of at least thirty (30) shifts of operating experience under the supervision of a qualified Nuclear Power Plant Operator, Second Class, within six (6) months prior to recommendation for qualification.

c. Recommendation of Shift Supervisor of the shift to which individual is assigned.

d. Recommendation of Shift Supervisor of the shift to which individual is not assigned.

e. Recommendation by an NPPO, Second Class Qualification Board to the Officer-In-Charge of the plant concerned.

f. Recommendation of the OIC of the plant concerned.

=== Nuclear power plant operator, first class [Control Room Operator] ===
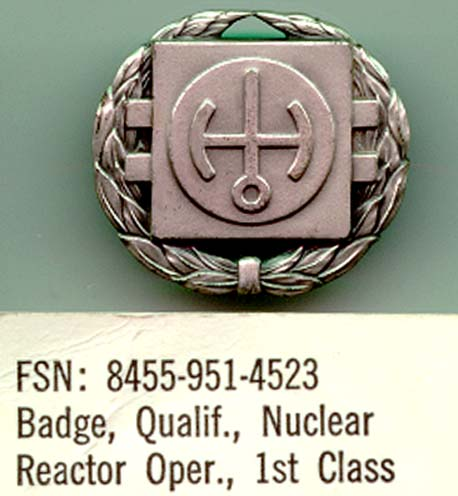

a. Certification as an NPPO, Second Class.

b. Satisfactory completion of an approved training program. Minimum requirements are:

(1) Satisfactory completion of comprehensive practical training and examinations covering all aspects of the operations, maintenance, and plant safety for this level of qualification. An Operations Record will be completed for each trainee.

(2) Satisfactory completion of the following operating experience within the six (6) months prior to recommendation for qualification:

(a) For initial qualification, completion of at least thirty (30) shifts as a qualified NPPO, Second Class, and completion of at least thirty (30) shifts of operating experience under the supervision of a qualified NPPO, First Class.

(b) For additional qualification, completion of at least fifteen (15) shifts as a qualified NPPO, Second Class, and completion of at least fifteen (15) shifts of operating experience under the supervision of a qualified NPPO, First Class.

c. Recommendation of Shift Supervisor of the shift to which individual is assigned.

d. Recommendation of Shift Supervisor of the shift to which individual is not assigned.

e. Recommendation by an NPPO, First Class Qualification Board to the Officer-In-Charge of the plant concerned.

f. Recommendation of the OIC of the plant concerned.

=== Shift supervisor ===
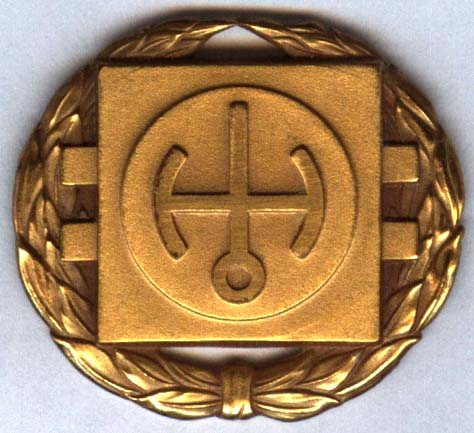
Shift Supervisor badge

a. Certification as an NPPO, First Class of the plant concerned

b. Satisfactory completion of an approved training program. Minimum requirements are:

(1) Satisfactory completion of comprehensive practical training and examinations covering all aspects of the operations, maintenance, and plant safety for this level of qualification.

(2) Satisfactory completion of the following operating experience within the six (6) months prior to recommendation for qualification:

(a) For initial qualification, completion of at least thirty (30) shifts as a qualified NPPO, First Class, and completion of at least forty (40) shifts as a Shift Supervisor Trainee.

(b) For additional qualification, completion of at least fifteen (15) shifts as a qualified NPPO, First Class, and completion of at least fifteen (15) shifts as a Training Shift Supervisor.

c. Recommendation of Shift Supervisor of the shift to which individual is assigned.

d. Recommendation of Shift Supervisor of the shift to which individual is not assigned.

e. Recommendation by an NPPO, Shift Supervisor Qualification Board to the Officer-In-Charge of the plant concerned.

f. Recommendation of the OIC of the plant concerned.

== See also ==
- Military badges of the United States
- Army Nuclear Power Program
