= SM-1 =

Former nuclear reactor developed for the US Army

Coordinates: 38°40′36″N 77°8′40″W

SM-1 (Stationary, Medium-size reactor, prototype #1) was a 2-megawatt nuclear reactor developed by the American Locomotive Company (ALCO) and the United States Atomic Energy Commission (AEC) as part of the US Army Nuclear Power Program (ANPP) in the mid-1950s. The compact "package" reactor was designed to produce electricity and generate heat for remote military facilities. The first, the SM-1, served as the Army's primary training facility to train reactor operations personnel from all three services (Army, Navy and Air Force). In 1954, the Department of Defense placed the US Army in charge of all military nuclear power plants except those used for propulsion by the US Navy. The Army's Chief of Engineers established the US Army Engineer Reactors Group in April 1954, and decided to construct the SM-1 facility at the Corps of Engineers headquarters at Fort Belvoir, Virginia, about 18 miles (29 km) south of Washington, D.C. About 800 personnel were trained on the SM-1 during its operational life, from 1957 to 1973. The power plant was shut down in March 1973, and is monitored within a "restricted access" section of the post. Inspectors enter the shut-down operations control room every decade or so. USACE has started dismantling the SM-1 facility, and estimate completion by 2026.

== Construction of the SM-1 facility ==
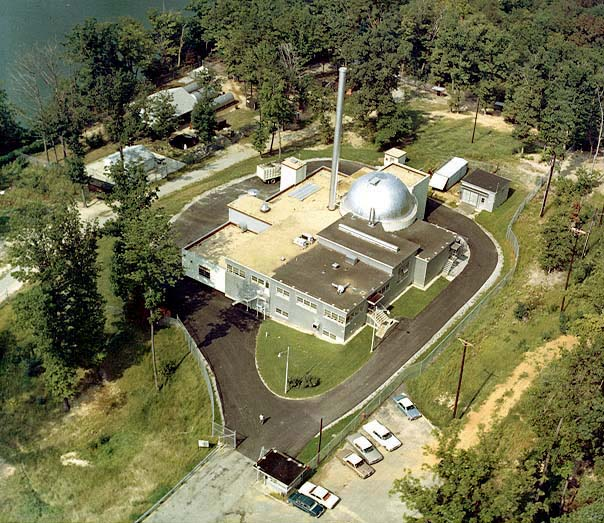
SM-1 at Ft. Belvoir, Virginia. Note the stainless steel reactor containment dome and the proximity of water (top left) in Gunston Cove. (Undated photo, but cars appear to be late-1960s models.)

Research and development of the reactor design was conducted in 1952–54 at the Oak Ridge National Laboratory, under the guidance of the Package Power Group. Funding for the reactor was approved in 1954 and bids to construct the facility were received from 18 companies, ranging in price from $2 million to $7 million. According to Time magazine of 18 July 1955, the Army selected the low bid ($2,096,753), submitted by the American Locomotive Company (ALCO Products) of Schenectady, New York, and awarded the contract in December 1954.

The name "SM-1" stands for Stationary, Medium-size reactor, prototype #1. The pressurized-water reactor (PWR) design developed by the AEC was a heterogeneous, water-cooled and water-moderated, stainless steel system, using highly enriched (93%) uranium dioxide mixture as fuel.

The term "package" in the name Army Package Power Reactor refers to the program objective of designing a compact nuclear power plant whose components could be packed for delivery to remote facilities aboard large military transport aircraft. The SM-1 served as the prototype for the SM-1A power plant, which was constructed at Fort Greely, Alaska, between 1960 and 1962. The reactor core itself was compact, about the size of a household dishwasher.

At a press conference held on 19 August 1954, (then) Major General Sturgis, Chief of Engineers, announced the plan by the Army and the AEC to build the "package" power plant at Fort Belvoir. A location in a "closed area" of the garrison had been selected, near a point at which Accotink Bay (aka, Gunston Cove) joins the Potomac River. The general said the design of the package reactor resembles the nuclear power plant on the US Navy's (newly launched) nuclear submarine Nautilus. He also said the reactor could be housed in a building 29 feet (8.8 m) wide, 42 feet (13 m) high and 80 feet (24 m) long. The Army was sending out a request for proposals, that day, to "33 qualified bidders", and companies were being asked to come up with a "competitive lump-sum bid", rather than a cost-plus estimate. On 14 December 1954, the AEC announced that the contract was being given to American Locomotive Company of New York, whose $2 million bid was the lowest of the 18 proposals received. Asking companies to submit a lump-sum bid was hailed, at that time, as a sign of how much progress had been made in reactor power plant design by mid-1954, such that companies now had sufficient experience and could calculate costs with confidence.

Construction of the building to house the reactor began on 5 October 1955 in the southeast "corner" of Fort Belvoir, Virginia, alongside Gunston Cove, off the Potomac River. According to a news note in the December 1955 Bulletin of the Atomic Scientists, "Construction of the 'package' or portable reactor has been started at Fort Belvoir, VA. Alco Products is the contractor for the Defense Department and the AEC. The reactor will generate about 2,000 kilowatts of electricity, enough for a community of about 5,000 people." ALCO Products supplied the reactor, pressurizer and steam generator, while Westinghouse Electric Corporation supplied the canned-rotor pumps, General Electric supplied the turbine and generator, the Lummus Company supplied the condenser, and Minneapolis-Honeywell installed the controls. By late October 1955, the Army pushed ALCO to accelerate construction towards a completion date of 10 July 1957. As a result, all major work was completed by March 1957.

== Reactor goes critical, April 1957 ==
Construction was completed in 18 months, the SM-1 reactor achieved first criticality on 8 April 1957, and the plant was formally opened in a public ceremony on 29 April 1957. Designed as a small-scale, pressurized-water, commercial nuclear power plant the power output from the SM-1 was connected to the local electrical grid. Thus, the SM-1 and Fort Belvoir hold the distinction of delivering the first nuclear generated electricity for public use in America, coming online several months before the (much larger, $55 million) Shippingport Reactor (in December 1957.)

According to a June 1957 report in the industry magazine POWER, "Normal operation (of the SM-1) will need a total of 29 men. Operators will be high-school graduates with 1-year training, led by engineers." The location of the Army's nuclear reactor training facility alongside Gunston Cove explains why the floating MH-1A came to be tested at Fort Belvoir in April 1966.

=== Facility hailed as a model for "Atoms for Peace" ===
Foreign defense military attachés tour the facility about 2 months after it opened.

The successful operation of the SM-1 was promoted by the Department of Defense as a demonstration of President Eisenhower's "Atoms for Peace" program. Shortly after it was placed in operation in 1957, the Pentagon invited a group of foreign defense military attaches stationed in Washington D.C. to tour the Fort Belvoir facility. A 30-second news video of that 1957 visit shows military officers from Cuba, Costa Rica and Portugal, amongst the group invited inside the reactor control room.

== Reactor closed in 1973, building reopens as museum ==
Plans to decommission the SM-1 reactor were announced in June 1972, and the reactor was shut down for the last time on 16 March 1973: four members of the first group of operators trained in 1957 participated in the shutdown ceremony. According to a 1998 US Army report on the Army Reactor Program, during its 16 years of operations the facility trained some 800 nuclear operations specialists. During its operational life, the SM-1 reactor had its core replaced twice. According to a January 2001 report compiled by the Department of Energy, the total amount of uranium-235 supplied for the SM-1's three cores was 72.7 kilograms: the U-235 was enriched to 93 percent. The spent fuel from the first core was sent to the Idaho National Engineering and Environmental Laboratory (the INEEL, originally known as the Idaho National Reactor Testing Station) and the fuel from the SM-1's second and third cores was sent to the Savannah River Site.

In April 1975, the reactor building was reopened to the public as a museum until the mid-1980s when it was again closed to the public.

== SM-1 photo gallery ==
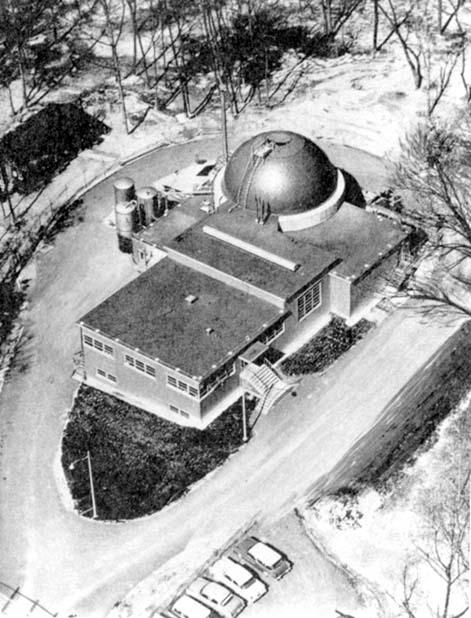
SM-1 before the "HP mod"

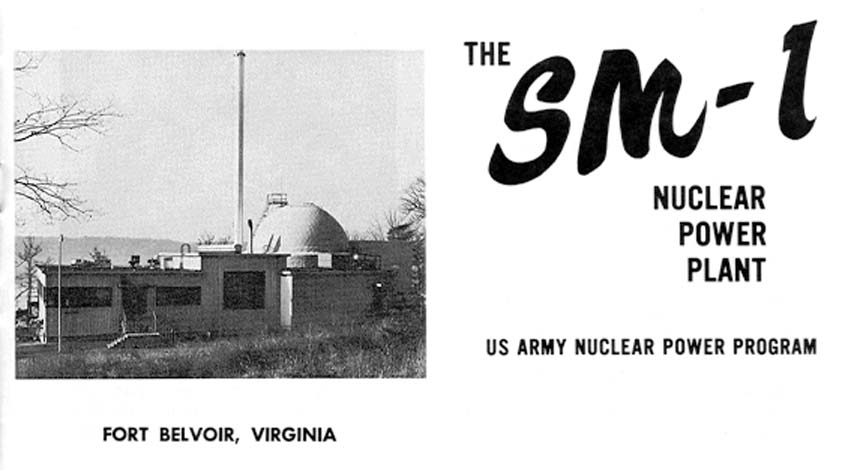
ANPP brochure

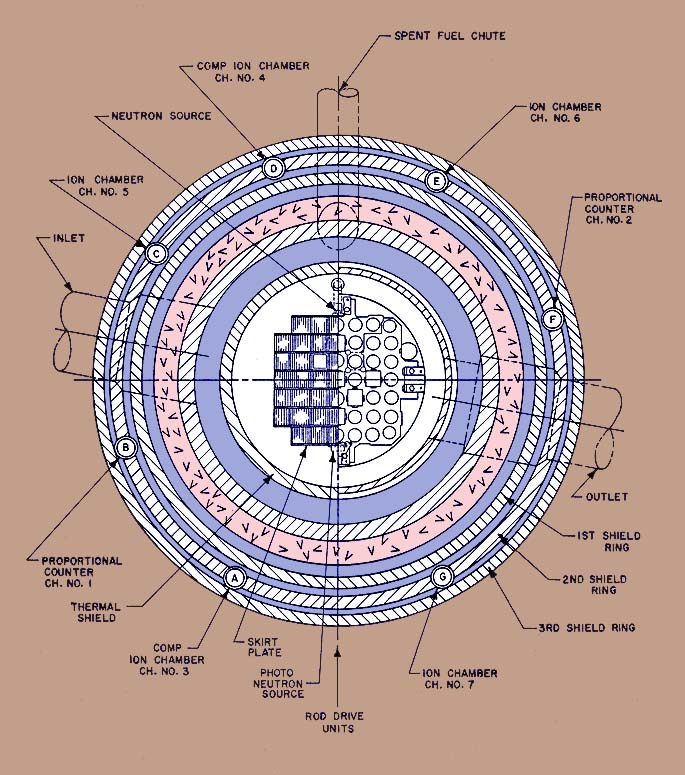
Sketch of the reactor shield, pressure vessel, core and instruments

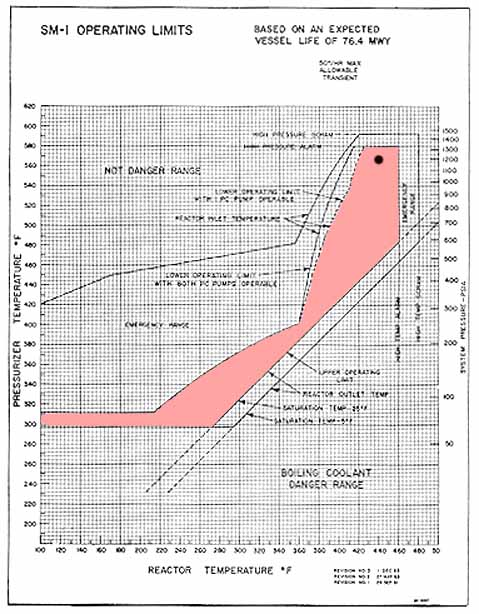
Operation limits

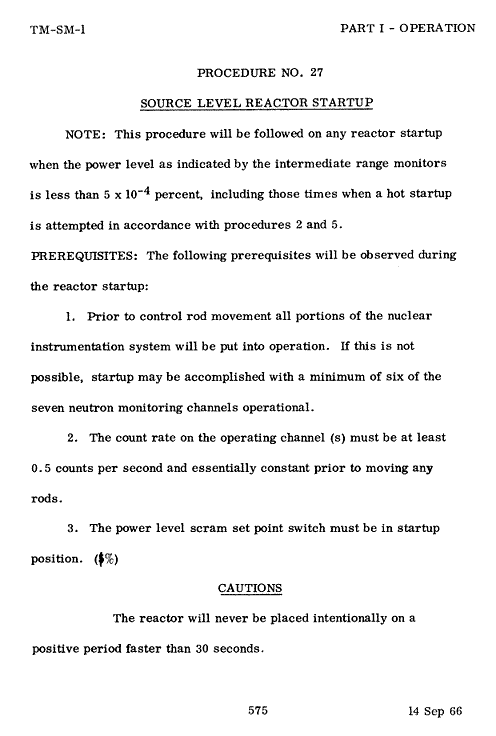
Startup procedure

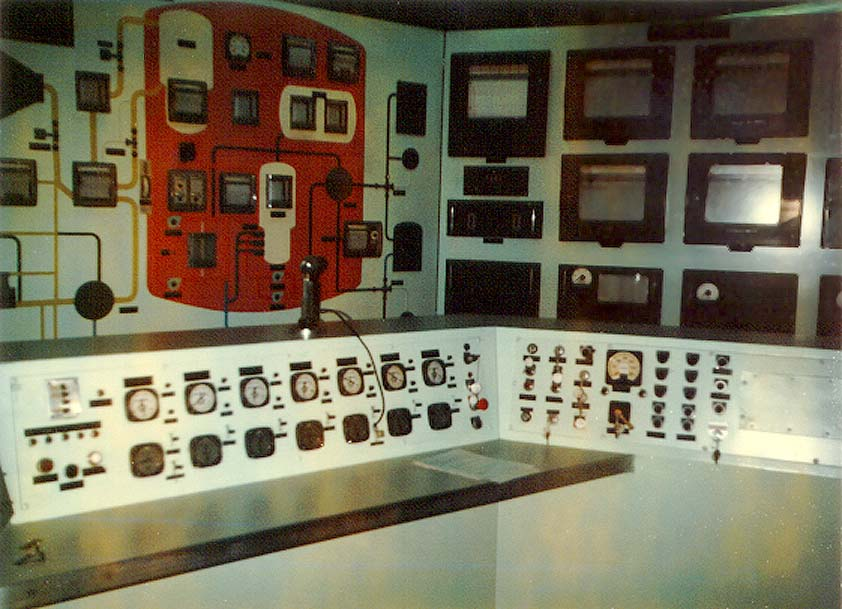
Control room: control rod position indicators in the foreground

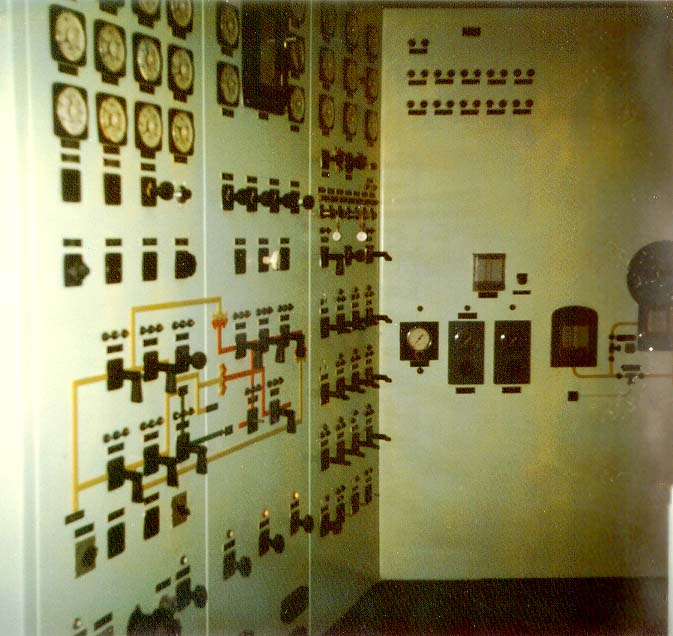
Electrical panel, control room

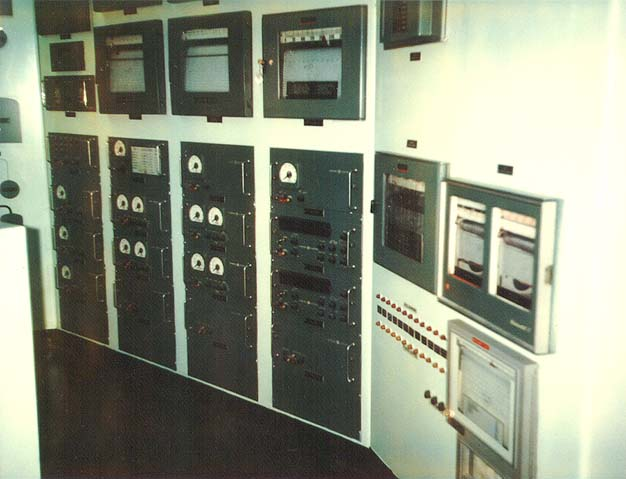
Nuclear instrument panel, control room

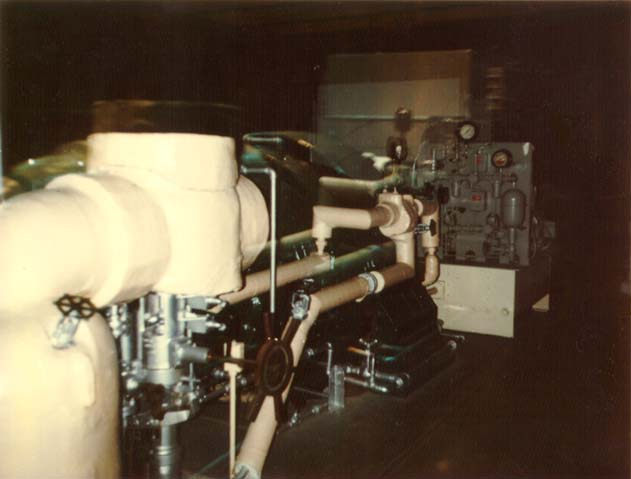
Turbine (generator in background)

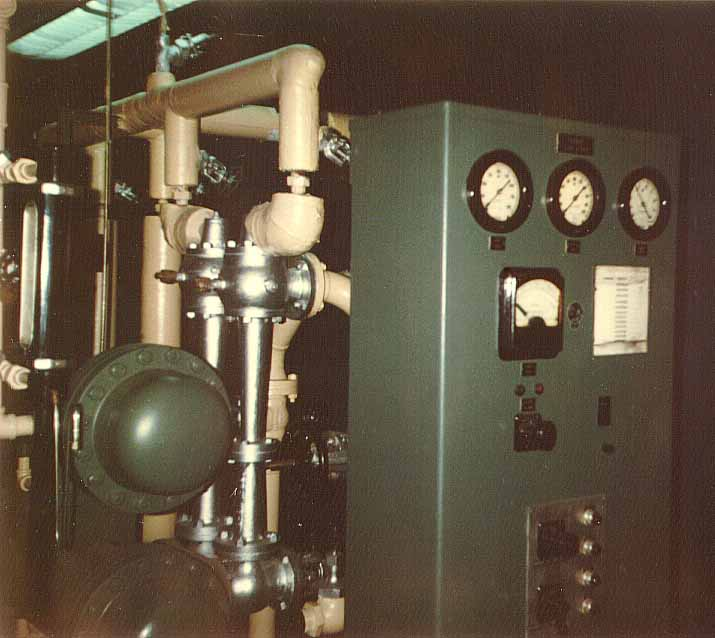
Steam-jet air ejectors, turbine deck

== External sources ==
- Special Features of Military Package Power Reactors Report issued 8 August 1956 by Oak Ridge National Laboratory Applied Nuclear Physics Division
