= Pohick, Virginia =

Unincorporated community in Virginia, United States

- Unincorporated community
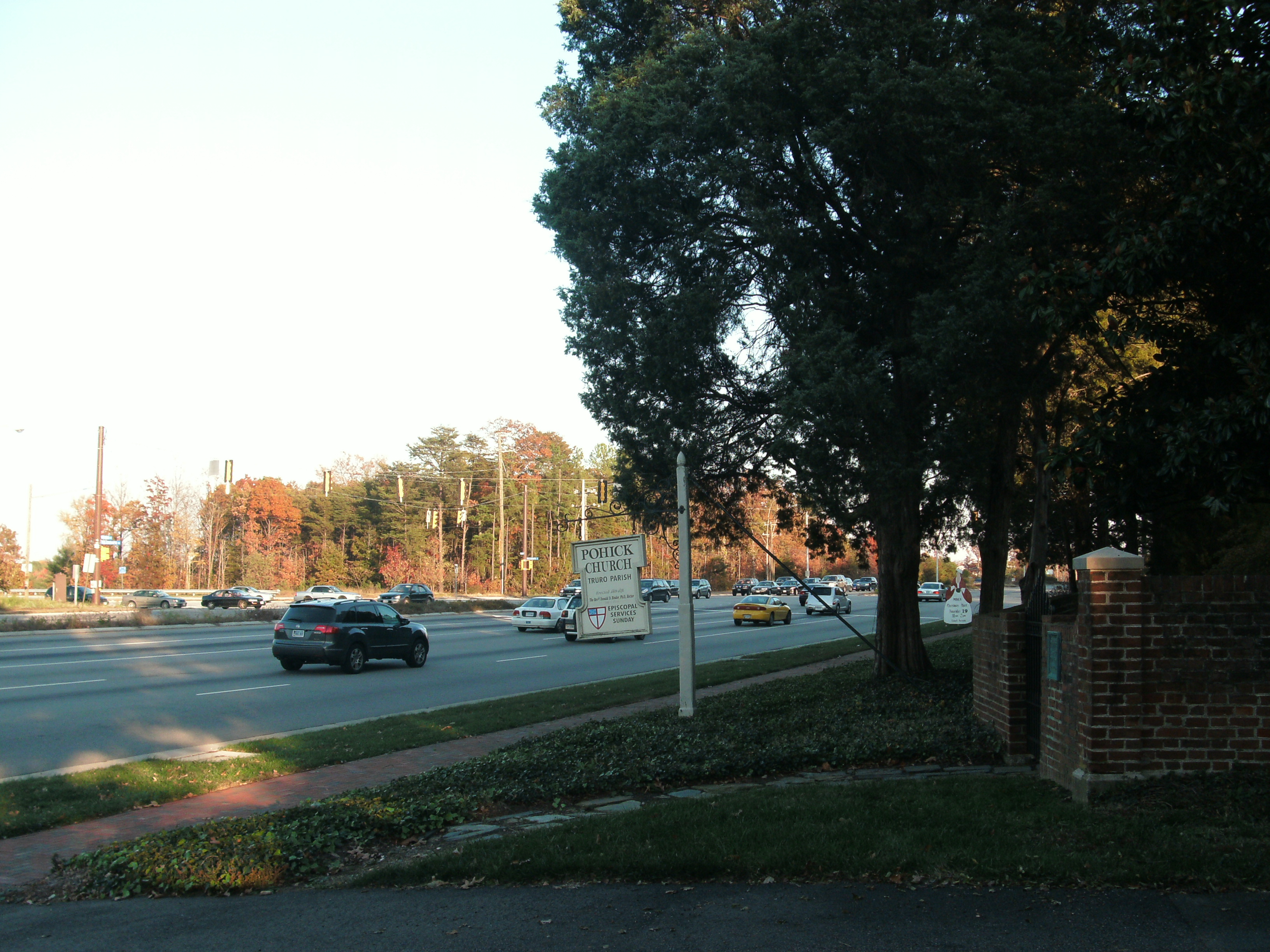
- Route 1 at Pohick Church, 2009

- Location within Northern Virginia Location within Virginia Location within the United States
- Coordinates: 38°42′36″N 77°11′48″W
- Country: United States
- State: Virginia
- County: Fairfax
- Time zone: UTC−5 (Eastern (EST))
  - Summer (DST): UTC−4 (EDT)
- GNIS feature ID: 1495094

Pohick is an unincorporated community in Fairfax County, Virginia, United States. Pohick is centered between the intersections of Rolling and Telegraph Roads with Richmond Highway (U.S. 1). It is adjacent to the communities of Lorton and Newington. Pohick takes its name from Pohick Church which in turn is named for Pohick Creek.
