= MH-1A =

Former floating nuclear power station

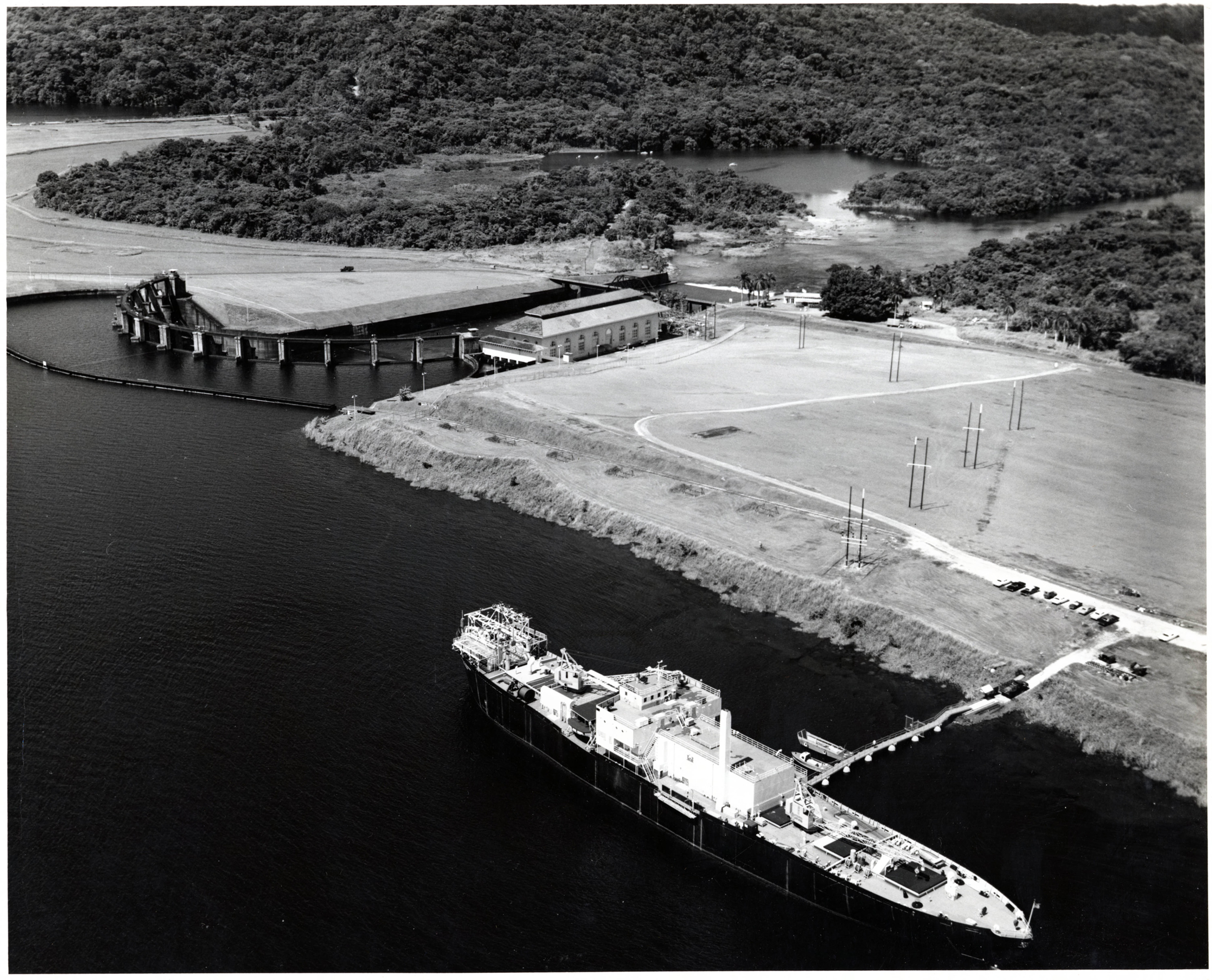
- MH-1A at the Panama Canal
- Country: United States of America
- Coordinates: 37°7′53.1618″N 76°38′51.2124″W
- Status: Decommissioned
- Construction began: 1963
- Commission date: 1967
- Decommission date: March 27, 2014
- Construction cost: $17 million

Nuclear power station
- Reactor type: PWR

Power generation
- Nameplate capacity: 10 MW

External links
- Commons: Related media on Commons

MH-1A was the first floating nuclear power station. Named Sturgis after General Samuel D. Sturgis III, this pressurized water reactor built in a converted Liberty ship was part of a series of reactors in the US Army Nuclear Power Program, which aimed to develop small nuclear reactors to generate electrical and space-heating energy primarily at remote, relatively inaccessible sites. Its designation stood for mobile, high power. After its first criticality in 1967, MH-1A was towed to the Panama Canal Zone that it supplied with 10 MW of electricity. Its dismantling began in 2014 and was completed in March 2019.

== Design ==
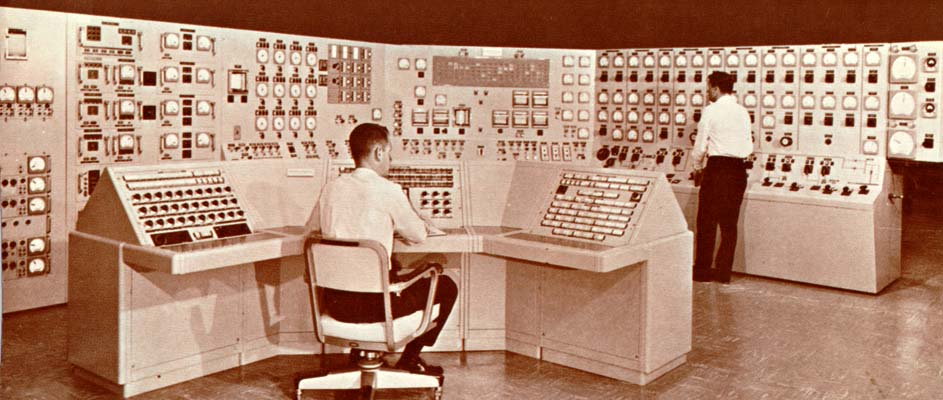
MH-1A control room simulator at Fort Belvoir.

The MH-1A was designed as a towed craft because it was expected to stay anchored for most of its life, making it uneconomical to keep the ship's own propulsion system.

It contained a single-loop pressurized water reactor, in a 350-ton containment vessel, using low enriched uranium (4% to 7% ^{235}U) as fuel.

The MH-1A had an elaborate analog-computer-powered simulator installed at Fort Belvoir. The MH-1A simulator was obtained by Memphis State University Center for Nuclear Studies in the early 1980s, but was never restored or returned to operational service. Its fate is unknown after the Center for Nuclear Studies closed.

== Construction ==
The reactor was built for the U.S. Army by Martin Marietta under a $17,200,000 contract (August 1961), with construction starting in 1963. The reactor was built in Sturgis, a converted Liberty ship formerly known as SS Charles H. Cugle.

Sturgis (named after General Samuel D. Sturgis Jr.) was hull number 3145, and not as sometimes supposed SS William Sturgis, another liberty ship (hull number 800, scrapped in 1969).

Fort Belvoir, Virginia, was the headquarters of the Army Corps of Engineers and, beginning in 1954, the corps' newly created Army Reactors Branch. This unit was established by the Department of Defense to develop compact nuclear power plants that could be utilized to supply heat and power at remote locations. The army's first nuclear power reactor, the SM-1, was built at Fort Belvoir in 1955–57 by the American Locomotive Company (ALCO). It was located in the southeast "corner" of the post, alongside Gunston Cove, off the Potomac River. The SM-1 reactor, also known as the Army Package Reactor Program, was used to train nuclear operations personnel for all three services. For that reason, the MH-1A was installed and tested aboard the Sturgis while it was moored in Gunston Cove, near the SM-1 facility.

Dredging a channel between the main course of the Potomac River and the shoreline of Gunston Cove began on 30 November 1964. At the same time, construction of an access road, power lines and the pier began, just below the SM-1 reactor facility. The Sturgis arrived at the new Gunston Cove pier on 22 April 1966, having been towed from Mobile, Alabama. The MH-1A reactor first went critical on 24 January 1967 and was formally "accepted" by the Army on 25 July 1967. The Sturgis remained at the pier for another 11 months, supplying power to Fort Belvoir, while the Corps of Engineers sought a suitable permanent site. In spring 1968, the US State Department entered into negotiations with the Panama Canal Company, and the Sturgis was towed out of Gunston Cove in late July 1968, arriving Gatun Lake on 7 August.

== Panama Canal Zone, 1968–1976 ==
After testing at Fort Belvoir for five months starting in January 1967, Sturgis was towed to the Panama Canal Zone. The reactor supplied 10 MW (13,000 hp) electricity to the Panama Canal Zone from October 1968 to 1975.

A water shortage in early 1968 jeopardized both the efficient operation of the Panama Canal locks and the production of hydroelectric power for the Canal Zone. Vast amounts of water were required to operate the locks and the water level on Gatun Lake fell drastically during the December-to-May dry season, which necessitated curtailment of operations at Gatun Hydroelectric Station.

The ship was moored in Gatun Lake, between the Gatun Locks and the Chagres dam spillway. Beginning in October 1968 the 10 MW electrical power produced by the MH-1A plant aboard the Sturgis allowed it to replace the power from the Gatun Hydroelectric Station, which freed the lake water for navigation use. Additionally, the Andrew J. Weber, a diesel-fueled power barge of 20 MW capacity, was deployed to the Canal Zone in November 1968. These two barges not only contributed to meeting the Canal Zone’s power requirements, but also made possible conserving vast quantities of water that otherwise would be needed to operate the hydroelectric power station. The Corps of Engineers estimates that over one trillion gallons were saved (or, rather, freed up) between October 1968 and October 1972 – enough to permit fifteen additional ships to pass through the locks of the canal each day.

After one year of operations in the Canal Zone, the MH-1A reactor had to be refueled, a process which took one week (17–25 October 1969), according to a 1969 Corps of Engineers report. According to a 2001 report by the Federation of American Scientists, the MH-1A reactor had a total of five cores during its operational life. It used low-enriched uranium (LEU) in the range of 4 to 7 %, with a total amount of uranium-235 supplied being 541.4 kilograms (for the five cores).

The Sturgis was eventually replaced by two 21 MW Hitachi turbines, one on the Pacific side of the isthmus and one on the Atlantic side.

== End of life ==
=== Deactivation and mothballing at James River, 1976–1977 ===
The MH-1A plant was retired from service in 1976 since the Army Reactor Program had been discontinued, and, as a unique prototype, operation cost for the unit was high. Also, the Panama Canal Company acquired additional land-based electrical capacity and in 1976 it was determined that the Sturgis was no longer needed. It operated at an effective annual capacity factor of 0.56 over nine years.

Between December 1976 and January 1977, the power barge was towed back to the United States, sustaining storm-related damage so severe that it had to divert to the Military Ocean Terminal at Sunny Point, North Carolina, and undergo temporary structural repairs. Following repairs, the Sturgis was towed to Fort Belvoir, arriving in March 1977. Fuel was removed from the reactor at Fort Belvoir and shipped to the Savannah River Site, and the plant was put into SAFSTOR (safe storage), with decontamination and physical barriers to prevent release of radioactivity. The Sturgis was then moored in the James River outside Fort Eustis, Virginia and became part of the James River Reserve Fleet for 37 years, till 2015.

=== Decommissioning, dismantling and disposal, 2014–2019 ===
On March 27, 2014, the US Army Corps of Engineers awarded a $34,663,325.34 contract to Chicago Bridge & Iron (CB&I) for the decommissioning, dismantling and disposal of the MH-1A nuclear reactor installed on the Sturgis barge. The reactor had already been de-fueled, decontaminated, and sealed before being towed to the James River Reserve Fleet. According to the decommissioning plan the Sturgis was to be relocated to Galveston, Texas, where CB&I would remove the residual radioactive waste materials. After that the remaining portions of the barge would be transported to Brownsville, Texas, for disposal or recycling as scrap, using standard ship-breaking methods. In 2019 the ship was scrapped. The move to Galveston, originally planned for September 2014, was delayed waiting for the city to issue a permit for the decommissioning. The Army started the move in April 2015, to be completed in mid-May. The ship arrived in Brownsville, TX on September 26, 2018 and was scrapped by 2019.
