= Floating nuclear power plant =

Nuclear power station on a floating vessel

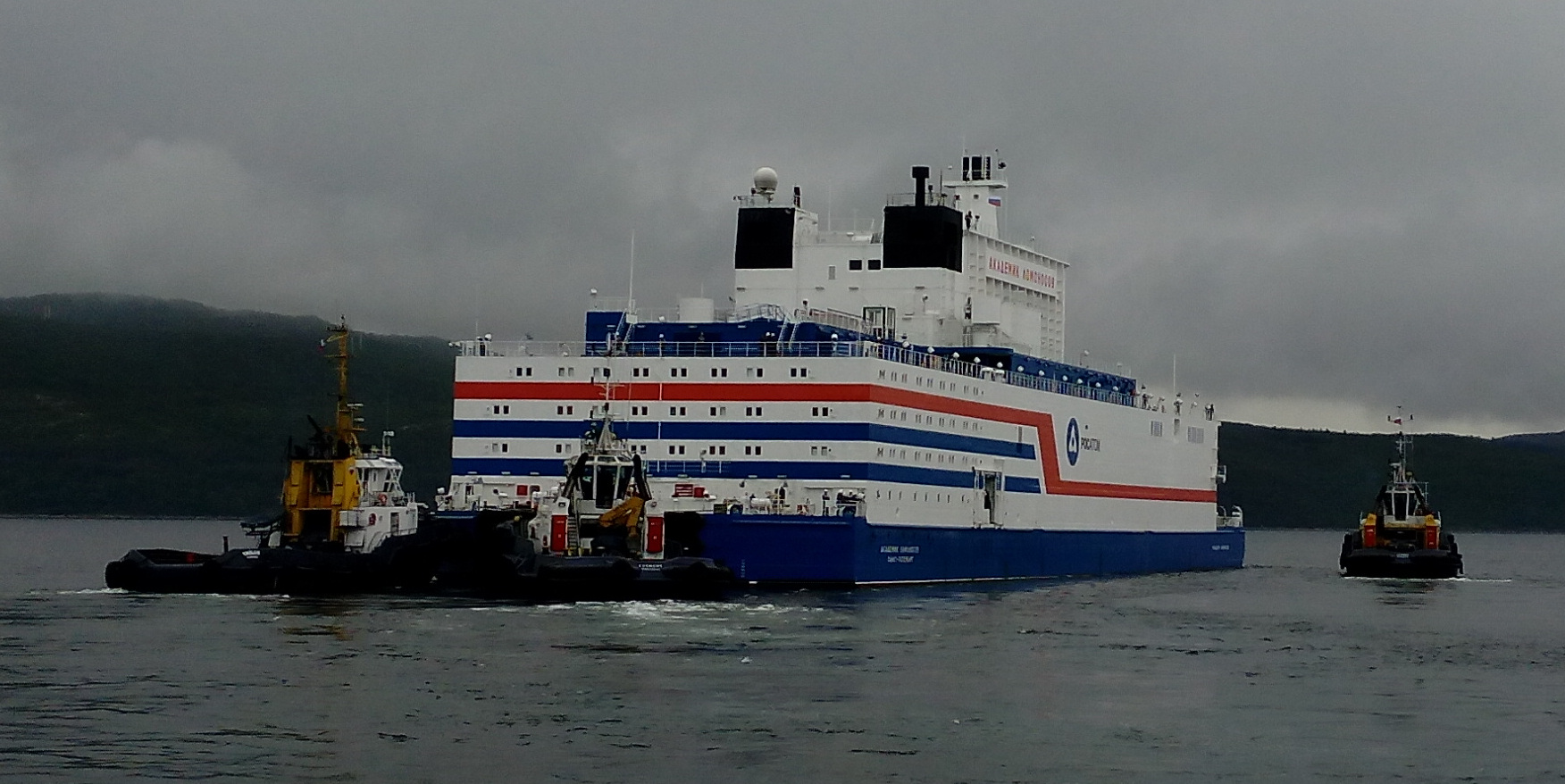
Akademik Lomonosov is as of 2023 the only operational floating nuclear power plant.

A floating nuclear power plant is a floating power station that derives its energy from a nuclear reactor. Instead of a stationary complex on land, they consist of a floating structure such as an offshore platform, barge or conventional ship.

Since the reactors employed are smaller in size and power than most commercial land-based reactors, mostly derived from nuclear ship and submarine power plants, the power output is generally a fraction of a conventional nuclear power plant, usually around 100MWe, although some are planned to have as much as 800MWe.

The advantage of such power plants is their relative mobility and their ability to deliver in-situ electric power "on demand" even to remote regions, since they can be moved or towed to position with relative ease within large water bodies, and then docked with coastal facilities to transfer the produced power and heat to a land power grid. However, environmental groups are concerned that floating nuclear power plants are more exposed to accidents than onshore power stations and also pose a threat to marine habitats.

== History ==
=== 20th century ===
The first floating nuclear power station was the MH-1A, using pressurized water reactor built in a converted Liberty ship, which achieved criticality in 1967. Proposals to build floating nuclear power plants off the coast of New Jersey and off Jacksonville, Florida were considered in the 1970's but ultimately scrapped.

=== 21st century ===
In the 21st century, Russia has been a leader in the development of floating nuclear power stations. On 14 September 2019, Russia’s first floating nuclear plant, Akademik Lomonosov, arrived at its permanent location in the Chukotka region. It began operation on 19 December 2019.

In 2022, the United States Department of Energy funded a three-year study to research offshore floating nuclear power generation. That same year, NuScale Power and Canadian company Prodigy announced a joint project to develop a North American small modular reactor-based floating plant.

Samsung and UK-based Core Power are also exploring the use of compact molten-salt reactor technology for floating platforms, with Samsung proposing a modular power barge capable of producing up to 800 MWe.

== Advantages ==
Floating nuclear power plants offer several benefits:

- They require little to no land use and minimal concrete construction.
- They are resistant to earthquakes.
- They can be relocated, refueled, refurbished, and decommissioned with relative ease.
- They are surrounded by water, which can be used for both active and passive cooling.
- They can provide power to remote areas where conventional plants may not be practical.

== See also ==
- Floating solar
- Floating wind turbine
