= ML-1 =

Test nuclear reactor built by the US Army

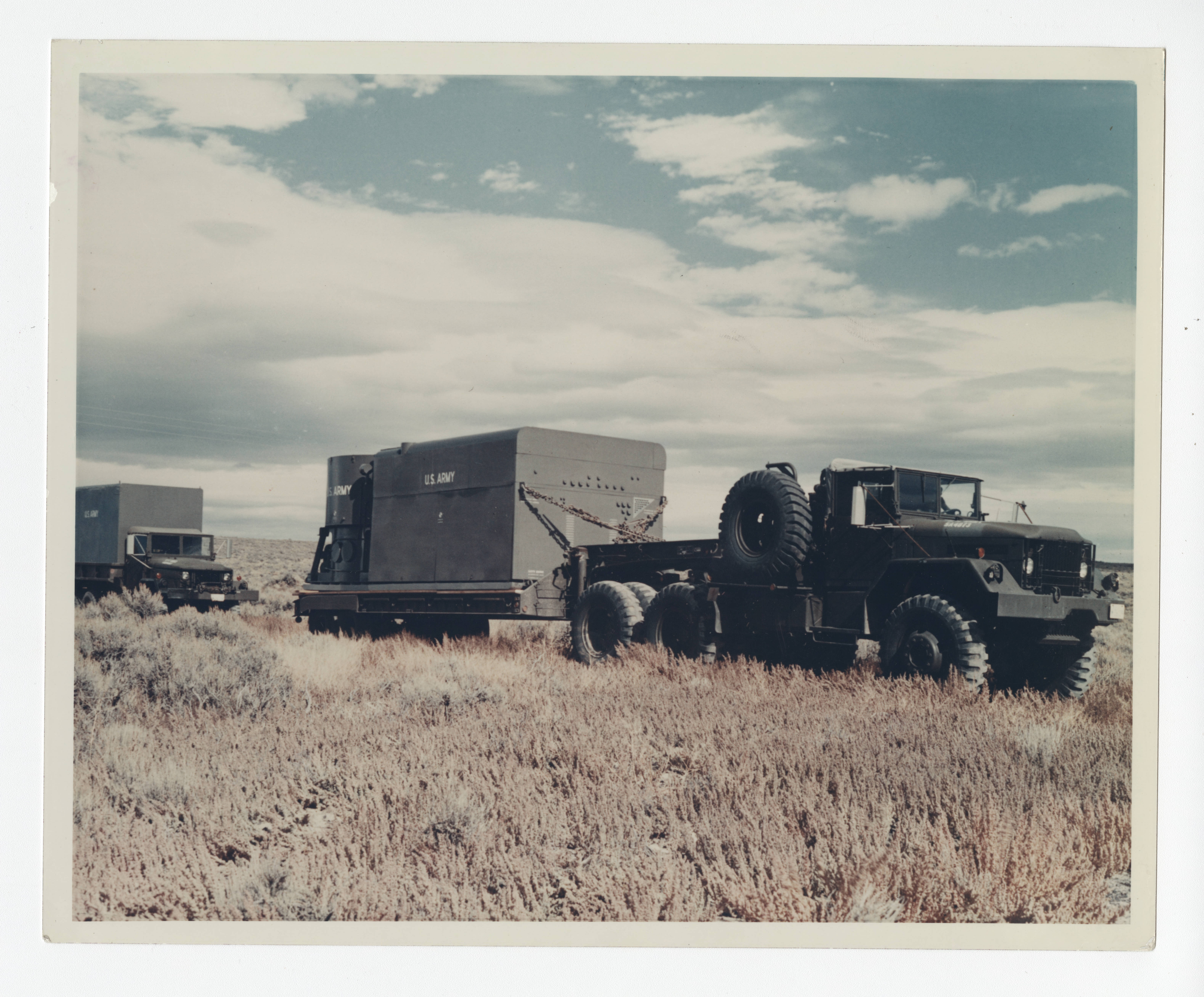
Full-scale ML-1 mockup at the National Reactor Testing Station in Idaho. The actual reactor was tested nearby.

ML-1 was an experimental nuclear reactor built as part of the US Army Nuclear Power Program between 1961 and 1965. It was intended to provide truck-mounted nuclear power that could accompany troops from place to place and provide power to command and communication centers, evacuation hospitals, depots, and radar and weapons systems.

Unlike the other seven reactors of this program, it did not use a steam turbine, but instead used a nitrogen coolant at 315 pounds per square inch (2,170 kPa) to drive a closed-cycle gas turbine. It was designed to produce 3.3 MW_{thermal} of heat and 400 kW of shaft horsepower with an outlet temperature of 1,200 °F (649 °C).

Though the concept of a nitrogen closed cycle gas turbine was strong, the design failed to live up to expectations, and was abandoned with the closure of ML-1 in 1965 after several major refits and with only a few hundred hours of testing completed in all. Similar concepts have been more recently proposed as part of the PBMR program as derivatives thereof.

A 1964 economic analysis concluded that the overall cost of purchasing and operating the ML-1 for a period of 10 years would be about ten times that of a comparable diesel plant at normal fuel costs.

== Concept ==
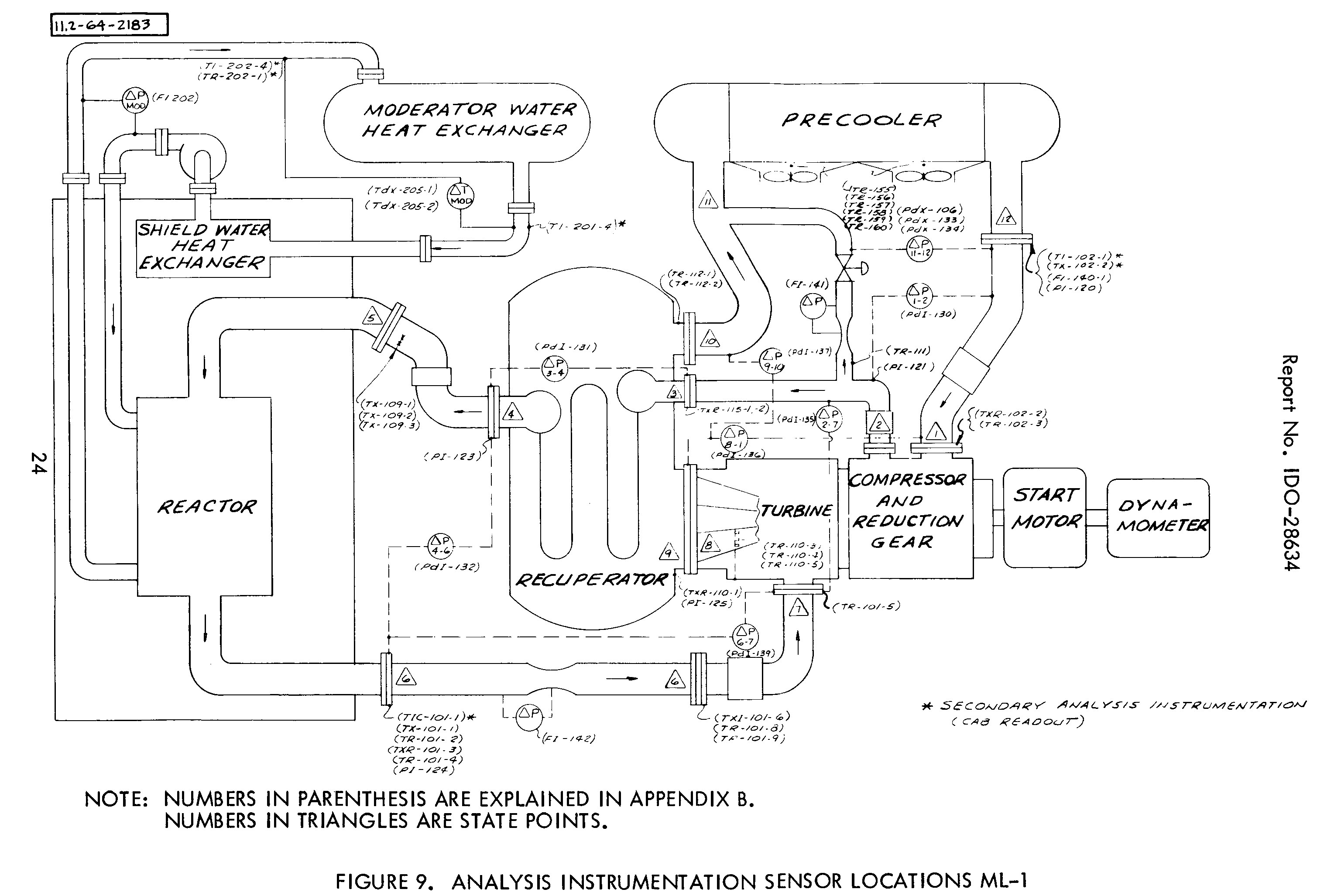
Simplified diagram of the ML-1

The basic concept of a closed-cycle gas turbine using nitrogen, a relatively inert gas, in a closed loop with a fission heat source interposed between the compressor and turbine stages of a gas turbine was and remains very strong.

As such, the Atomic Energy Commission saw that such a reactor might meet the needs of the Army; the Army was interested, and the design and fabrication process began.

== Design and fabrication ==
The design of ML-1 was driven by the requirements of the customer, i.e., the Army, which wanted a turbine transportable by aircraft (having a low weight and being a cargo container in size) which led the engineers of Aerojet-General Nucleonics, the principal contractor, to make unusual design choices.

Extensive shielding was omitted in favor of a personnel exclusion zone of 500 feet (150 m) while in operation; efficiency enhancing devices such as recuperators were incorporated; insulation was specified to keep thermal values within optimum limits; a complex control system and a complex core were implemented; a completely new gas turbine was designed for the application; and the working fluid - nitrogen - was compressed to 9 standard atmospheres (910 kPa).

The design specification achieved its goals; the plant worked (on paper); and was transportable to Army requirements.

The ML-1 was fabricated as specified, though it was discovered later that materials not to specification were present (the specified stainless steel alloy for some of the piping, grade 316L had insufficient chromium in its composition in several locations, making it susceptible to corrosion) though this was not immediately evident in the delivered product.

== Acceptance testing ==
The ML-1 first operated as a power plant on September 21, 1962, producing only a few kilowatts of electricity. It first reached full power on February 28, 1963. On March 4, after the first 100-hour high power test, it was discovered that coolant gas was leaking into the moderator water. The plant was disassembled and rebuilt, and went back online in the spring of 1964.

The ML-1 worked (though never to specification, only achieving a peak output of 66% of the specified electrical output), but it had numerous major issues along the route to working. Rapid shutdowns were commonplace, often due to spurious sensor readings, while real mechanical problems - with the non-nuclear components of the system - often were undetected until a degree of damage occurred. Fairly or unfairly, it became regarded to a certain extent as a "lemon" by top Army brass, and budget cuts due to the Vietnam War shut it down for good in 1965.

== Analysis ==
Rodney Adams, in a 1996 Atomic Insights article, argues that the ML-1 design and implementation was flawed due to the decision to build an advanced, highly efficient, easily transportable closed-cycle nitrogen gas turbine before any other functional version of the design had been created.

Adams opines that the designers of ML-1 made several incorrect decisions, including adding an unnecessary recuperator to enhance efficiency, using a calandria-based water-tube fission heat source unproven in the "real world", using nine atmospheres of pressure at the compressor inlet that saved space but required a custom-built turbine rather than one designed for atmospheric pressures, placing insulating foil within the gas piping to improve efficiency (the foil later broke off and contaminated the closed loop with its flecks, causing deflaking problems for engineers), and using custom-built, first-of-a-kind components instead of using commercially proven aircraft or power generation derived turbines.
