= Partial meltdowns at Leningrad and Chernobyl =

Nuclear incidents at Leningrad Unit 1 and Chernobyl Unit 1

On 30 November 1975, Unit 1 of the Leningrad nuclear power plant suffered a fuel melting event. A channel of the RBMK reactor of the first power unit of the Leningrad nuclear power plant was starved of coolant, and subsequently overheated, ruptured and partially melted away, degrading the graphite core and releasing radiation into the atmosphere.

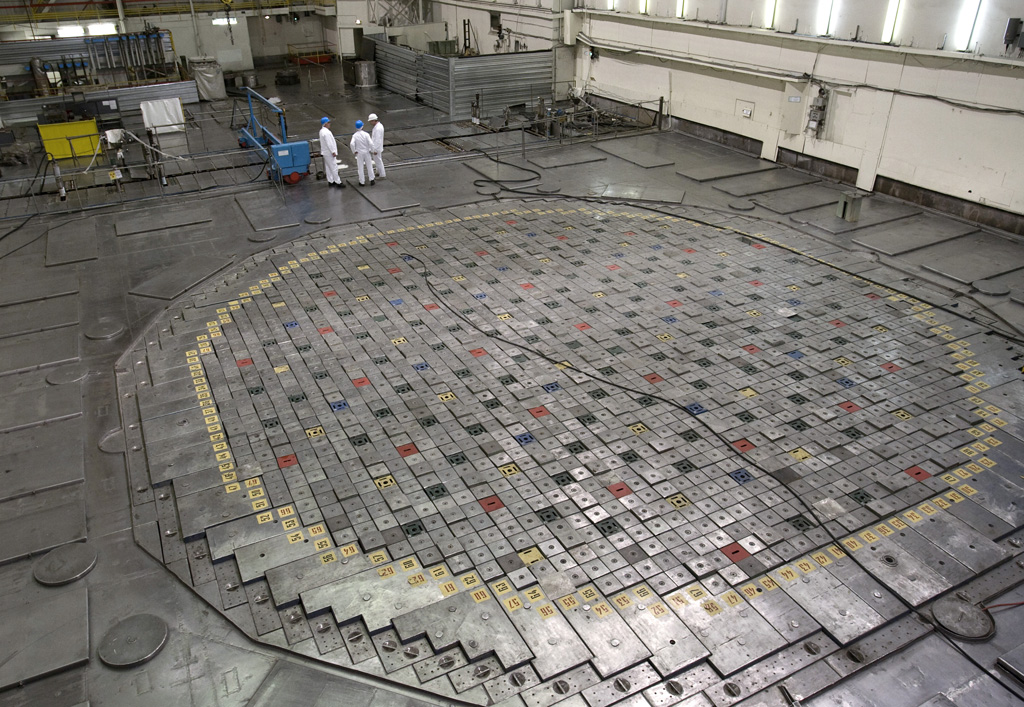
RBMK reactor with fuel channel covers

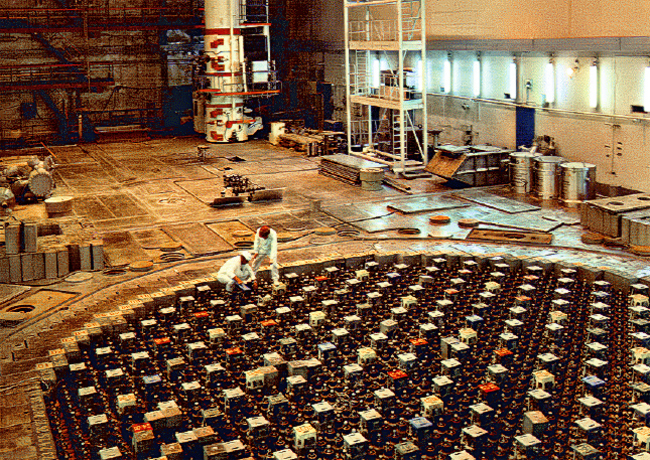
Reactor hall of the RBMK-1500 at Ignalina Nuclear Power Plant, Lithuania—the upper biological shield (UBS) lies several meters below the floor of the reactor hall. There are no channel covers on the fuel channels of the reactor; the control rod drives are below the colored covers.

Schematic plan view of core layout, Chernobyl RBMK reactor No. 4. (Quantity of each rod type in parentheses): neutron detector (12) control rods (167) short control rods from below reactor (32) automatic control rods (12) pressure tubes with fuel rods (1661–1691)(1-2-nd generation cores(RBMK) The numbers in the image indicate the position of the respective control rods (insertion depth in centimetres) at 01:22:30, 78 seconds before the reactor exploded.

A similar incident occurred at Unit 1 of the Chernobyl nuclear power plant on the 9th September 1982 but was more severe than the 1975 Leningrad incident.

== Soviet policy ==
The exclusively autonomous Ministry of the USSR, the Ministry of Medium Machine Building, along with the KGB, covered up these incidents very well, and they were kept secret from the public as well as other power plants. Practically the same accident occurred in Unit 1 of the Chernobyl Power Station in 1982.

After the disaster, design changes which were being recommended by scientists from all over the Soviet union and abroad were finally implemented to improve the safety of RBMK reactors and the small EGP-6 reactors at Bilibino Nuclear Power Plant which was shutdown in December 2025.

== Leningrad incident ==
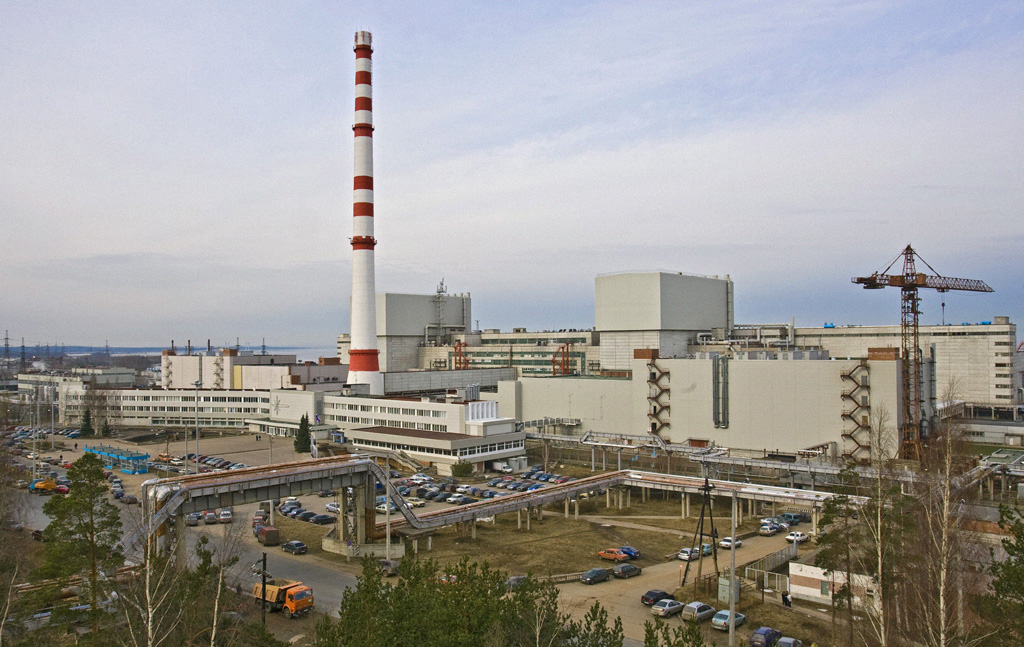
Leningrad I nuclear power plant units 1 and 2

On 30 November 1975, the first major accident involving an RBMK reactor occurred a year after reactor 1 reached its full power. The reactor was being brought back online following scheduled maintenance. The AZ-5 protection key was tripped, following which a partial meltdown occurred, damaging 32 fuel assemblies and releasing radiation over the Gulf of Finland. The Ministry of Medium Machine Building set up a commission to investigate what had gone wrong. Later on, the official conclusion was that a manufacturing defect had led to the destruction of a single fuel channel. The investigating commission, however, had been made aware that the accident was the result of the design faults inherent in the reactor and caused by an uncontrollable increase in the steam void coefficient. The commission made several important recommendations, to be applied to all RBMK-1000 reactors: "develop new safety regulations to protect them in the event of coolant loss; analyze what would happen in the event of a sharp rise in steam in the core; and devise a faster-acting emergency protection system." On the next day of this accident, approval was given to construct 2 more reactors at Chernobyl.

== Chernobyl incident ==
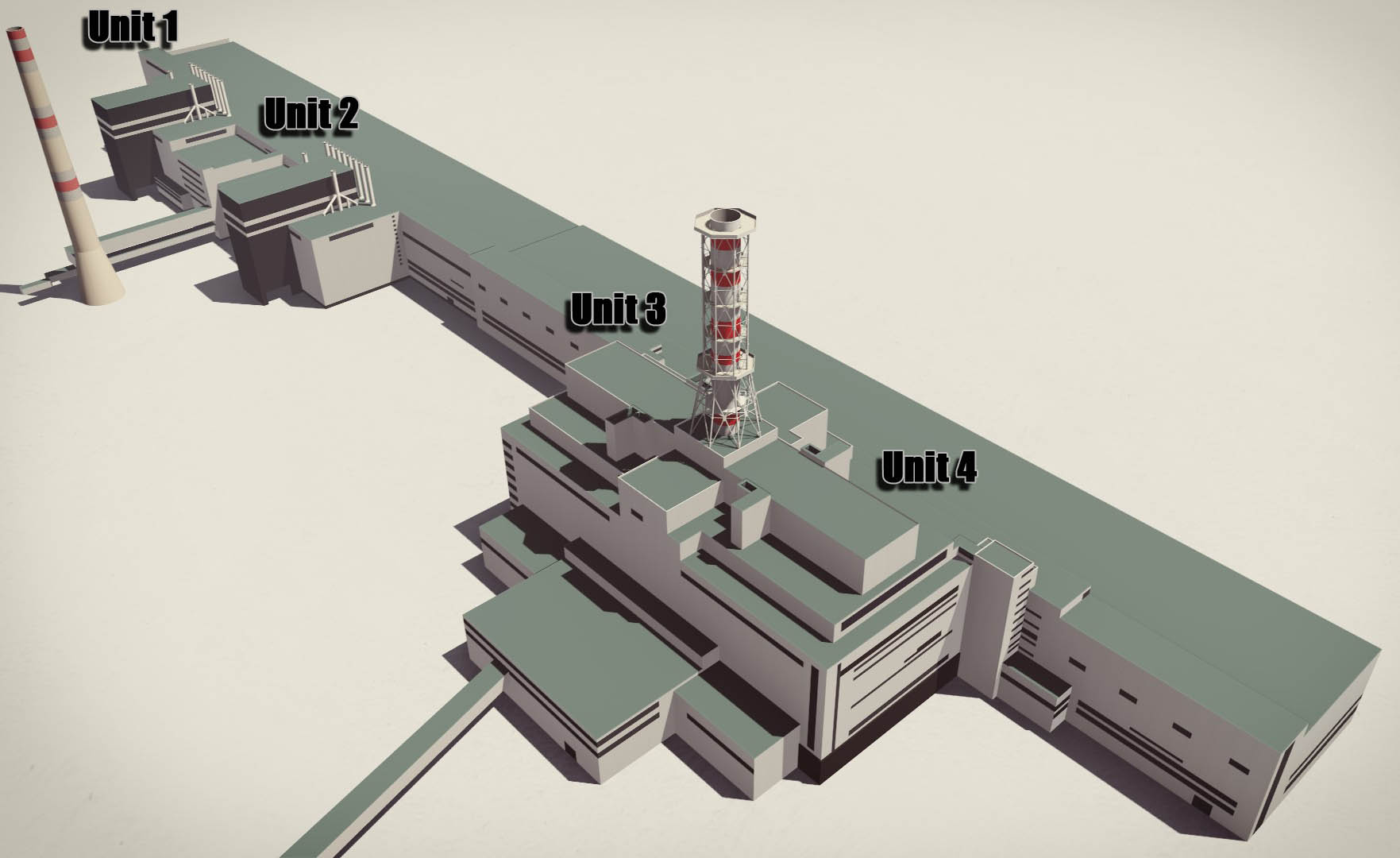
Computer-generated synthesis drawing of all 4 units prior to the accident viewed from NW

On 9 September 1982, a partial core meltdown occurred in the reactor of the first power unit of the ChNPP due to a faulty cooling valve remaining closed following maintenance. Chernobyl unit 1 was already coming out of a very difficult and complicated maintenance period. Once the reactor came online, the fuel channel overheated and ruptured and the fuel in it partially melted down. This occurred due to a so-called valving error by the operators, while some reports claimed that it occurred due to the plant manufacturing its own channels on site, which were not competent with the design requirements laid down by the designers of the RBMK at Kurchtov institute and NIKIET. The extent of the damage was comparatively minor as compared to the 1986 disaster at Unit 4, and no one was killed during the accident. However, due to the negligence of the operators and faulty equipment of the control system, the accident was not noticed until several hours later, resulting in significant release of radiation in the form of fragments of uranium oxide and several other radioactive isotopes escaping with steam from the reactor via the ventilation stack while others accumulating in the steam separator drums. This accident was somewhat similar to the 1975 Leningrad unit 1 accident. The accident was not made public until several years later due to the policies of the Soviet government and the Central Committee of the Communist Party of the Soviet Union, despite cleanups taking place in and around the power station and Pripyat. The roads of Pripyat were resurfaced with tar. This incident was more severe than the 1975 Leningrad incident and caused permanent damage to the reactor core. The reactor was repaired and put back into operation after eight months with its capacity reduced by 20% to 800MWe as the damaged part of the core and graphite could never be used again as fuel channels.

== Other known incidents ==
The RBMK power plants were one of the most dangerous due to design flaws, safety culture issues, political issues, and due to faulty equipment and this was known to the Soviet Government. From the startup of the first power unit of the Leningrad nuclear power plant in 1973, and many other units including those at other sites being commissioned later, various incidents and accidents occurred from time to time, which were ignored and operations continued In the same way. Many scientists from the Kurchtov institute, and NIKIET had already warned about the underlying threats and had suggested design changes, but they were ignored. Instead of dealing with the design flaws, manuals were revised. These are some of the known incidents are listed below :

- Explosion of a tank holding radioactive gases at the Leningrad Nuclear Power Plant unit 1 in January 1975
- Partial meltdown of Leningrad unit 1
- Power outage at the Kursk Nuclear Power Plant in 1980
- Partial meltdown of Chernobyl unit 1
- Discovery of the positive scram effect at Ignalina Nuclear Power Plant unit 1 in 1983 and at unit 4 of the Chernobyl Nuclear Power Plant
- Shifting of the concrete cross bars at Chernobyl Nuclear Power Plant units 3 and 4 in 1984
- Chernobyl disaster in 1986
- Turbine fire at Chernobyl unit 2 in 1991 resulting in its permanent shutdown
- On 28 December 1990, during refurbishment of Leningrad unit 1, it was noticed that the space between the fuel channels and the graphite stack (contaminated during the 1975 accident) had widened. The contaminated graphite was spilled, and the radiation levels in the space under the reactor increased. Radiation was detected 6 km away from the unit, but this was not reported in the media.
- On 3 December 1991, at Leningrad Nuclear Power plant, due to faulty equipment and a lack of safety rule compliance, 10 new fuel rods were dropped and damaged. The staff tried to conceal the accident from the plant's management.
- Melting of cables at Chernobyl unit 1 in 1991 while testing of the ion chambers during a maintenance shutdown, the automatic control rods didn't respond during the AZ-MM signal, the Low power protection system failed
- Radioactive water was released when a seal plug of one of the Main Circulation Pump of Chernobyl unit 1 failed in 1992
- Chernobyl unit 3 scrammed following high level of water in the steam separator drums in March 1993
- Chernobyl unit 3 scrammed in 1994 following a short circuit resulting in pumping of the Emergency core cooling system(ECCS) water from the ECCS tanks into the steam separator drums via the ECCS accumulators
- Chernobyl unit 3 scrammed following detection of a steam leak in one of the fuel channel due to defective welding during assembly in 1981
- Chernobyl unit 1 was scrammed using the AZ-5 switch after the refueling machine got stuck in one of the channels in 1995
- On 27 August 2009, the third unit of the Leningrad Nuclear Power plant was stopped when a hole was found in the discharge header of a pump. According to the automated radiation control system, the radiation situation at the plant and in its 30-kilometre (19 mi) monitoring zone was normal. The plant's management refuted rumors of an accident and stated that the third unit was stopped for a "short-term unscheduled maintenance", with a restart scheduled for 31 August 2009.

== Reasons behind the incidents and the solutions ==
Schematic diagram of an RBMK

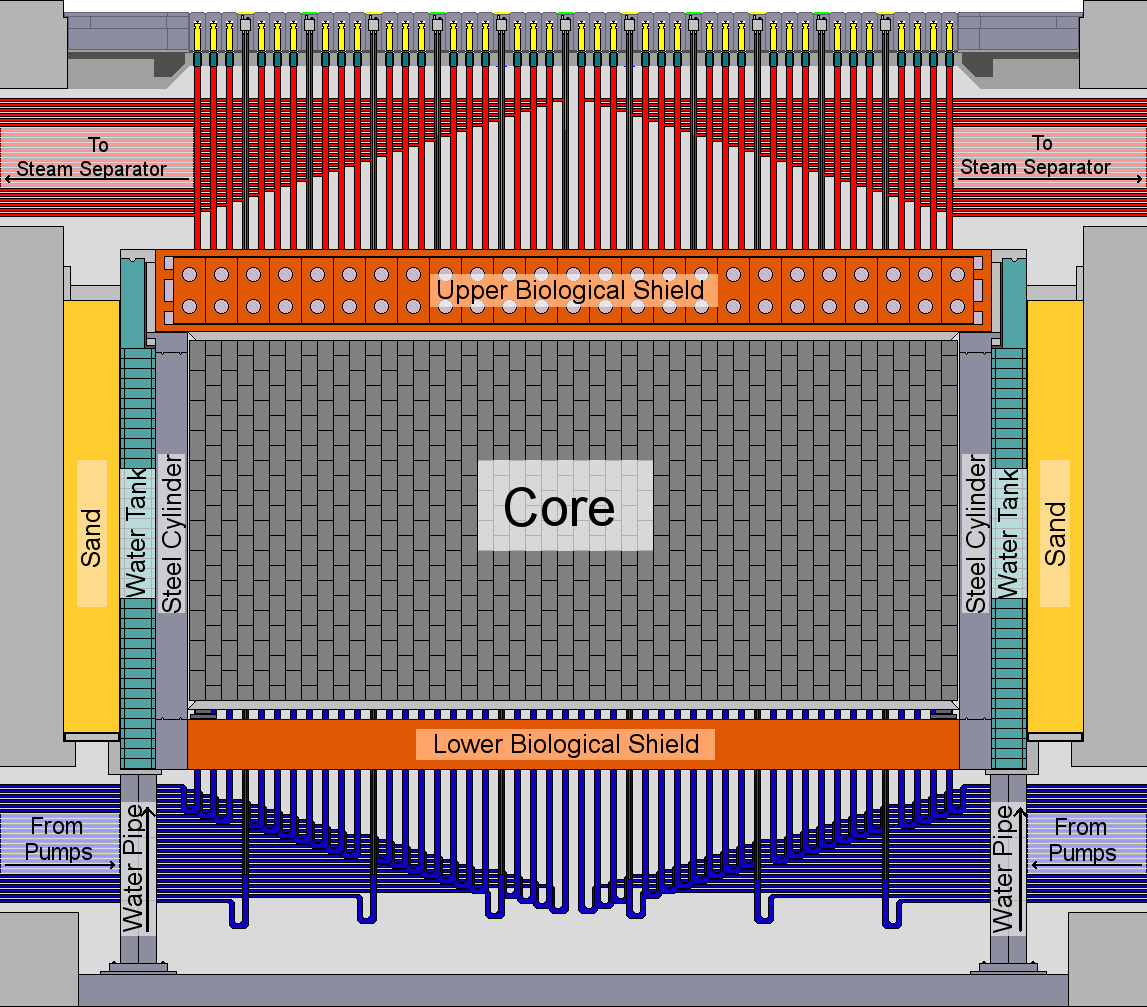
Schematic side view of the layout of an RBMK reactor core

The reactor hall and piping systems of the RBMK reactor.

The reasons contributing to the incidents were many. A flawed design, with poor safety culture, and miscommunication between the Soviet nuclear industry, irresponsible policies, etc. contributed to the low safety to RBMK power plants. The RBMK reactor design had many short comings. As an early Generation II reactor based on 1950s Soviet technology, the RBMK design was optimized for speed of production but sacrificed redundancy. Several of its design characteristics would prove to be dangerously unstable when operated outside their design specifications. The decision to use a graphite core with natural uranium fuel allowed for massive power generation at only a quarter of the expense of heavy water reactors, which were more maintenance-intensive and required large volumes of expensive heavy water for startup. However, its unintended consequences would not reveal themselves fully until the Chernobyl disaster in 1986. While a part of the incidents occurred due to the design flaws in the reactor, a part of them were also caused due to unhealthy safety culture and undertrained and irresponsible staff and management personnel.

=== High positive void coefficient ===
The positive void coefficient was one of one of the most dangerous flaws in the RBMK design. Light water (ordinary H_{2}O) is both a neutron moderator and a neutron absorber. This means that not only can it slow down neutrons to velocities in equilibrium with surrounding molecules ("thermalize" them and turn them into low-energy neutrons, known as thermal neutrons, that are far more likely to interact with the uranium-235 nuclei than the fast neutrons produced by fission initially), but it also absorbs some of them. In the RBMK reactors, light water functions as a coolant, while moderation is mainly carried out by graphite. As graphite already moderates neutrons, light water has a lesser effect in slowing them down, but could still absorb them. This means that the reactor's reactivity (adjustable by appropriate neutron-absorbing rods) must take into account the neutrons absorbed by light water.

In the case of vaporisation of water to steam, the place occupied by water would be occupied by water vapor, which has a density vastly lower than that of liquid water (the exact number depends on pressure and temperature; at standard conditions, steam is about 1/1350 as dense as liquid water). Because of this lower density (of mass, and consequently of atom nuclei able to absorb neutrons), light water's neutron-absorption capability practically disappears when it boils. This allows more neutrons to fission more U-235 nuclei and thereby increase the reactor power, which leads to higher temperatures that boil even more water, creating a thermal feedback loop. This partially led to the incidents at Leningrad unit 1 and Chernobyl unit 1. In RBMK reactors, generation of steam in the coolant water would then in practice create a void: a bubble that does not absorb neutrons. The reduction in moderation by light water is irrelevant, as graphite still moderates the neutrons. However, the loss of absorption dramatically alters the balance of neutron production, causing a runaway condition in which more and more neutrons are produced, and their density grows exponentially. Such a condition is called a "positive void coefficient", and the RBMK reactor has the highest positive void coefficient of any commercial reactor ever designed. A high void coefficient does not necessarily make a reactor inherently unsafe, as some of the fission neutrons are emitted with a delay of seconds or even minutes (post-fission neutron emission from daughter nuclei), and therefore steps can be taken to reduce the fission rate before it becomes too high. This situation, however, does make it considerably harder to control the reactor, especially at low power. Thus, control systems must be very reliable and control-room personnel must be rigorously trained in the peculiarities and limits of the system. Neither of these requirements were in place at most of the RBMK power plants: since the reactor's actual design bore the approval stamp of the Kurchatov Institute and was considered a state secret, discussion of the reactor's flaws was forbidden, even among the actual personnel operating the plant. Some later RBMK designs did include control rods on electromagnetic grapples, thus controlling the reaction speed and, if necessary, stopping the reaction completely. All RBMK reactors underwent significant changes following the Chernobyl disaster. The positive void coefficient was reduced from +4.5 β to +0.7 β, decreasing the likelihood of further reactivity accidents, at the cost of higher enrichment requirements of the uranium fuel.

== See also ==
- Nuclear power in Russia
- Nuclear power in the Soviet Union
- RBMK
- Kostroma Nuclear Power Plant
