= MKER =

Russian nuclear reactor design based on the RBMK reactor design

The MKER (Russian: МКЭР, Многопетлевой Канальный Энергетический Реактор: Mnogopetlevoy Kanalynyi Energeticheskiy Reaktor, translation: multi-loop pressure tube power reactor) is a Russian third generation nuclear reactor design. It was a development of the RBMK nuclear power reactor. No reactor of the MKER-800 type (and presumably other types) will continue to be developed, as ROSATOM have shelved the design.

== Proposed operation ==
The MKER is a pressure tube reactor with modern safety features including a containment building and passive nuclear safety systems. Fuel can be changed while the reactor is in operation (online refueling), improving grid and fuel efficiency. Vertical injectors promote a natural convective flow of the light water primary circuit fluid through inlined channels in the reactor core. Graphite blocks in the reactor core serve as a neutron moderator.

There are three different types of MKER: the MKER-800, MKER-1000 and MKER-1500. No MKER of the MKER-800 type will be completed.

== MKER-800 ==
The MKER-800 has an electrical generation capacity of 800 MW. An automated process control system for the MKER-800 was under development in a joint project of Westinghouse and NIKIET. Plans for the MKER-800 were scrapped. Four MKER-800 units were originally planned for the Leningrad Nuclear Power Plant.

== MKER-1000 ==
The MKER-1000 has a thermal power output of 3000 MWth and an electrical output of 1,068 MW. There are four circuits and 1,832 fuel elements in the reactor core. Total fissile material in the reactor is 163 tonnes. Overall responsibility for construction of the MKER design is held by Northern Construction Administration. Major assemblies are produced by the Izhorsky Zavod in Saint Petersburg, and the turbine supplier is the Leningradsky Metallichesky Zavod. Main building and reactor containment is designed by Atomenergoproekt. The MKER is intended to directly substitute for existing RBMK plants producing heat, electricity and medical isotopes.

The reactor building of the MKER consists of a dual containment structure with an inner diameter of 55.5 meters. An inner liner intended to prevent leakage of radioactive material into the atmosphere can withstand internal pressures of 2 bar. Protection from external damage is provided by an outer concrete wall. The two structures are independent and separated physically from one another on a common foundation. Damage from an earthquake of $M_\mathrm{L}$ 8 would be contained by this structure.

Automatic control is an integral part of the MKER design. Located between the reactor building and the turbine hall, the control room oversees the automatic control system and various plant safety systems. It occupies a protected central location, minimizing possibility of damage or compromise.

The MKER-1000 core includes the pressure tube reactor and eight coolant injector pumps. There are multiple coolant loops with 16 independent circuits, two circuits sharing a pump each. From an overall thermal capacity of 3,000 MWth electrical generation of 1,000 MW plus an additional 130 MW of thermal energy for building heat can be obtained. The design specified turbine is a type K-1000-6, 1 / 3000 at 3000 rpm with an alternator of type TZV-1100-2UZ. Both evaporative cooling and open cycle cooling variations have been proposed.

Low-enriched uranium dioxide fuel with concentrations of 2.0 to 2.4% U-235 equivalence is specified. Fuel is changed using a remote-controlled crane and spent fuel rods would spend up to five years in a cooling pond located in the reactor hall before further processing. The continuous refuelling cycle brings a fuel burnup benefit; individual rods can be left longer in the reactor instead of being swapped en masse as required in most PWR designs.

== MKER-1500 ==
A further proposed development of the MKER is the MKER-1500 with a corresponding electrical generation capacity of 1500 MW. Transfer of heat from the reactor core has been improved in the new design, with primary loops divided into four independent circuits. The diameter of the coolant tubes is expanded to 600 mm and injector pump configuration is changed. Cooling circuits are relocated below the containment. The MKER-1500 was also proposed for the Leningrad nuclear power plant.

== Technical specifications ==
MKER technical specifications
Specifications	MKER-800	MKER-1000	MKER-1500
Thermal output, MW	2450	3000	4260
Electrical capacity of the unit, MW	860	1068	1500
Efficiency, net %	35.1	35.6	35.2
Fuel	UO_{2}	UO_{2}	UO_{2}, MOX
Neutron moderator and reflector	Graphite	Graphite	Graphite
Steam pressure in separators, atm	70	65	75
Average steam content at the outlet of the reactor, %	19.7	23.3	27.9
Feedwater temperature, °C	187	233	229
Inlet coolant temperature, °C	275	265.6	274
Coolant flow through the reactor, t/h	23300	25309	30804
Steam capacity, t/h	4600	5891	8600
Design life, years	50	50	50
Inner diameter containment, m	54	55.5	56.5
Number of steam separators, pcs.	8	8	4
Dimensions active zone, m:			
— height	6	6	7
— diameter	11	12.1	14
Process channel lattice pitch, mm	235×235	235×235	250×250
Number of technological channels	1580	1824	1824
Number of control and protection system channels	221	233	219
Enrichment, % ^{235}U	2.4	2.0—2.4	2.0—3.2
Average burnup depth of discharged fuel, MWd/kg:	26—28	28	30—45
Maximum graphite temperature, °C	510	560	640
Steam reactivity coefficient, β_{ef}	−2.8	−1.3	−0.8
Power reactivity coefficient, β_{ef}/MW	−1.6×10^{−3}	−7.1×10^{−4}	−3.3×10^{−4}

== Other links ==
- RBMK
- Nuclear power in Russia
