= RBMK =

Type of Soviet nuclear power reactor

RBMK reactor class
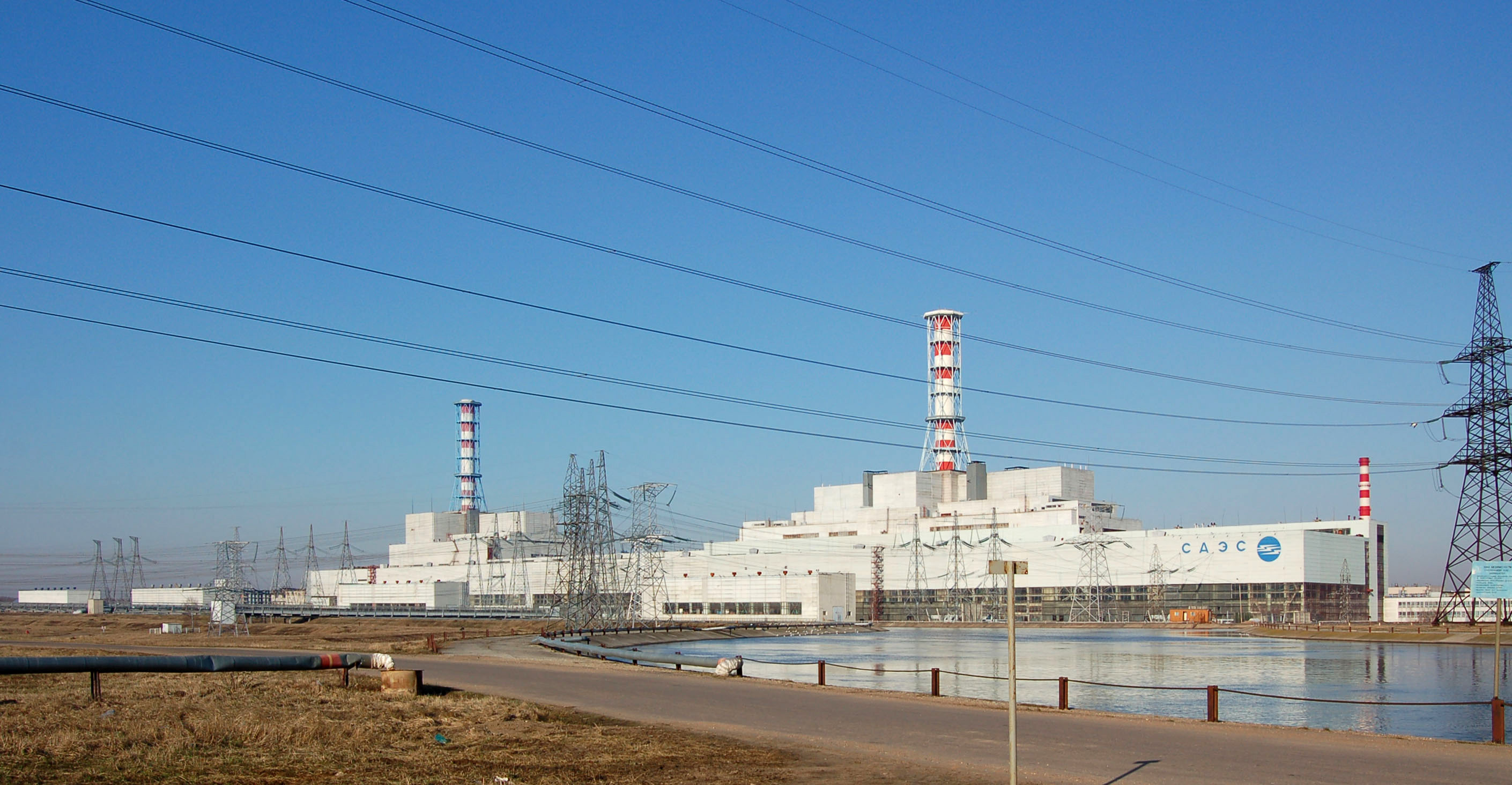
- View of the Smolensk Nuclear Power Plant site, with three operational RBMK-1000 reactors. A fourth reactor was cancelled before completion.
- Generation: Generation II reactor
- Reactor concept: Graphite-moderated light water-cooled reactor
- Reactor line: RBMK (Reaktor Bolshoy Moshchnosti Kanalniy)
- Reactor types: RBMK-1000; RBMK-1500; RBMKP-2400 (never built)
- Status: 26 blocks: 7 operational; 1 involved in accident; 9 cancelled; 9 decommissioned; 4 small EGP-6 graphite moderated BWR shut down at Bilibino Nuclear Power Plant; (as of December 2025)

Main parameters of the reactor core
- Fuel (fissile material): ^{235}U (NU/SEU/LEU)
- Fuel state: Solid
- Neutron energy spectrum: Thermal
- Primary control method: Control rods
- Primary moderator: Graphite
- Primary coolant: Liquid (light water)

Reactor usage
- Primary use: Generation of electricity
- Power (thermal): RBMK-1000: 3,200 MW_{th} RBMK-1500: 4,800 MW_{th} RBMKP-2400: 6,500 MW_{th}
- Power (electric): RBMK-1000: 1,000 MW_{e} RBMK-1500: 1,500 MW_{e} RBMKP-2400: 2,400 MW_{e}

The RBMK (Russian: РБМК, реактор большой мощности канальный, romanized: reaktor bolshoy moshchnosti kanalnyy, lit. 'high-power channel-type reactor') is a class of graphite-moderated nuclear power reactor designed and built by the Soviet Union. It is somewhat like a boiling water reactor as water boils in the pressure tubes. It is one of two power reactor types to enter serial production in the Soviet Union during the 1970s, the other being the VVER reactor. The name refers to its design where instead of a large steel pressure vessel surrounding the entire core, the core is surrounded by a cylindrical annular steel tank inside a concrete vault and each fuel assembly is enclosed in an individual 8.4 cm (inner) diameter pipe (called a "technological channel"). The channels also contain the coolant, and are surrounded by graphite.

The RBMK is an early Generation II reactor and the oldest commercial reactor design still in wide operation. Certain aspects of the original RBMK reactor design had several shortcomings, such as the large positive void coefficient, the 'positive scram effect' of the control rods and instability at low power levels—which contributed to the 1986 Chernobyl disaster, in which an RBMK experienced an uncontrolled nuclear chain reaction, leading to a steam and hydrogen explosion, large fire, and subsequent core meltdown. Radioactive material was released over a large portion of northern and southern Europe—including Sweden, where evidence of the nuclear disaster was first registered outside of the Soviet Union, and before the Chernobyl accident was communicated by the Soviet Union to the rest of the world. The disaster prompted worldwide calls for the reactors to be completely decommissioned; however, there is still considerable reliance on RBMK facilities for power in Russia with the aggregate power of operational units at almost 7 GW of installed capacity. Most of the flaws in the design of RBMK-1000 reactors were corrected after the Chernobyl accident and a dozen reactors have since been operating without any serious incidents for over thirty years.

RBMK reactors may be classified as belonging to one of three distinct generations, according to when the particular reactor was built and brought online:

- Generation 1 – during the early-to-mid 1970s, before OPB-82 General Safety Provisions were introduced in the Soviet Union.
- Generation 2 – during the late 1970s and early 1980s, conforming to the OPB-82 standards issued in 1982.
- Generation 3 – post Chernobyl accident in 1986, where Soviet safety standards were revised to OPB-88; only Smolensk-3 was built to these standards.

Beside RBMK, there are several other graphite-moderated reactors. A graphite-moderated Magnox reactor exists in North Korea at the Yongbyon Nuclear Scientific Research Center. While the gas cooled Magnox, AGR and pebble bed reactors (Such as the Dragon reactor at Winfrith) use graphite as moderators their use of gases (carbon dioxide for Magnox and AGR, while helium for Dragon) as heat transfer fluids causes them to have no void coefficient. 4 EGP-6 graphite water reactors which are a scaled down version of the RBMK were operating at the world's second northernmost nuclear power plant i.e. the Bilibino Nuclear Power Plant. One EGP-6 was shut down permanently in 2020. The remaining three EGP-6 were shut down permanently in December 2025.

== Lifespan ==
Initially the service life of the RBMK reactor type was expected to be 30 years, but this may be extended to 45 years with mid-life refurbishments (such as fixing the issue of graphite stack deformation in the core), and eventually a 50-year lifetime was adopted for some units (Kursk 1-3 and 1-4, Leningrad 1-3 and 1-4, Smolensk 1-1, 1-2, 1-3). Efforts are underway to extend the license of all the units. In July 2024, Leningrad unit 3's license was extended from 2025 to 2030. In February 2026, the Russian nuclear regulator approved a five year life extension to Leningrad Unit 4 to operate until 2031. Today all the reactors are operated by Rosatom's subsidiary Rosenergoatom.

In 2026, it was reported that the RBMK units of the Kursk plant had undergone significant safety upgrades reducing risks by almost 100 times.

== History ==
The RBMK was the culmination of the Soviet nuclear power program to produce a water-cooled power reactor with dual-use potential based on their graphite-moderated plutonium production military reactors. The first of these, Obninsk AM-1 ("Атом Мирный", Atom Mirny, Russian for "peaceful atom," analogous to the American Atoms for Peace) generated 5 MW of electricity from 30 MW thermal power, and supplied Obninsk from 1954 until 1959. Subsequent prototypes were the AMB-100 reactor and AMB-200 reactor both at Beloyarsk Nuclear Power Station.

The RBMK was a minimalist design that used regular (light) water for cooling and graphite for moderation, making it possible to use fuel with a lower enrichment (1.8% enriched uranium instead of considerably more expensive 4% enrichment). This allowed for an extraordinarily large and powerful reactor that could be built rapidly, largely out of parts fabricated on-site instead of by specialized factories. Because a containment building would have needed to be very large and expensive, doubling the cost of each unit, due to the large size of the RBMK, it was originally omitted from the design. It was argued by its designers that the RBMK's strategy of having each fuel assembly in its own channel with flowing cooling water was an acceptable alternative for containment.

The RBMK was mainly designed at the Kurchatov Institute of Atomic Energy and NIKIET, headed by Anatoly Aleksandrov and Nikolai Dollezhal respectively, from 1964 to 1966. A top-secret invention patent for the RBMK design was filed by Aleksandrov, who personally took credit for the design of the reactor, with the Soviet patent office. The RBMK was proclaimed by some as the national reactor of the Soviet Union, probably due to nationalism because of its unique design, large size and power output. Meanwhile the VVER (an earlier Soviet reactor design) was called the "American reactor" due to the pressurized water (PWR) design shared with many Western reactors. The RBMK was favored over the VVER by the Soviet Union due to its ease of manufacture, due to a lack of a large and thick-walled reactor pressure vessel and relatively complex associated steam generators, and its large power output, which would allow the Soviet government to easily meet their central economic planning targets.

The RBMK-1000's design was finalized in 1968. At that time it was the world's largest nuclear reactor design, surpassing western designs and the VVER in power output and physical size, being 20 times larger by volume than contemporary western reactors. Similarly to CANDU reactors and the Indian IPHWR reactors it could be produced without the specialized industry required by the large and thick-walled reactor pressure vessels such as those used by VVER reactors, thus increasing the number of factories capable of manufacturing RBMK reactor components.

The initial 1000 MWe design of the RBMK-1000 left room for development into yet more powerful reactors. For example, the RBMK reactors at the Ignalina Nuclear Power Plant in Lithuania were rated at 1500 MWe each, a very large size for the time and even for the early 21st century. For comparison, the EPR has a net electric nameplate capacity of 1600 MW (4500 MW_{thermal}) and is among the most powerful reactor types ever built.

The flaws in the original RBMK design were recognized by others, including from within the Kurchatov Institute before the first units were built, but the orders for construction of the first RBMK units, which were at Leningrad, had already been issued in 1966 by the Soviet government by the time their concerns reached the Central Committee of the Communist Party of the Soviet Union and the Soviet Council of Ministers. This prompted a sudden overhaul of the RBMK. Plutonium production in an RBMK would have been achieved by operating the reactor under special thermal parameters, but this capability was abandoned early on. This was the design that was finalized in 1968. The redesign did not solve further flaws that were not discovered until years later.

No prototypes of the RBMK were built; it was put directly into mass production. Construction of the first RBMK, which was at Leningrad Nuclear Power Plant, began in 1970. Leningrad unit 1 opened in 1973.

At Leningrad it was discovered that the RBMK, due to its high positive void coefficient, became harder to control as the uranium fuel was consumed or burned up, becoming unpredictable by the time it was shut down after three years for maintenance. This made controlling the RBMK a very laborious, mentally and physically demanding task requiring the timely adjustment of dozens of parameters every minute, around the clock, constantly wearing out switches such as those used for the control rods and causing operators to sweat. The enrichment percentage was increased to 2.0%, up from 1.8% to alleviate these issues.

The RBMK was considered by some in the Soviet Union to be already obsolete shortly after the commissioning of Chernobyl unit 1 (completed in 1977). Aleksandrov and Dollezhal did not investigate further or even deeply understand the problems in the RBMK, and the void coefficient was not analyzed in the manuals for the reactor. Engineers at Chernobyl unit 1 had to create solutions to many of the RBMK's flaws such as a lack of protection against no feedwater supply. Leningrad and Chernobyl units 1 both had partial meltdowns that were — alongside other nuclear accidents at Soviet power plants — treated as state secrets, and so were unknown even to other workers at those same plants.

By 1980 NIKIET realized, after completing a confidential study, that accidents with the RBMK were likely even during normal operation, but no action was taken to correct the RBMK's flaws. Instead, manuals were revised, which was believed to be enough to ensure safe operation as long as they were followed closely. However, the manuals were vague and Soviet power plant staff already had a habit of bending the rules to meet economic targets in the face of inadequate or malfunctioning equipment. Crucially, it was not made clear that a minimum number of control rods had to stay in the reactor at all times in order to protect against an accident, as loosely articulated by the Operational Reactivity Margin (ORM) parameter. An ORM chart recorder and display were added to RBMK control rooms after the Chernobyl disaster.

== Reactor design and performance ==
=== Reactor vessel, moderator and shielding ===
Schematic diagram of an RBMK

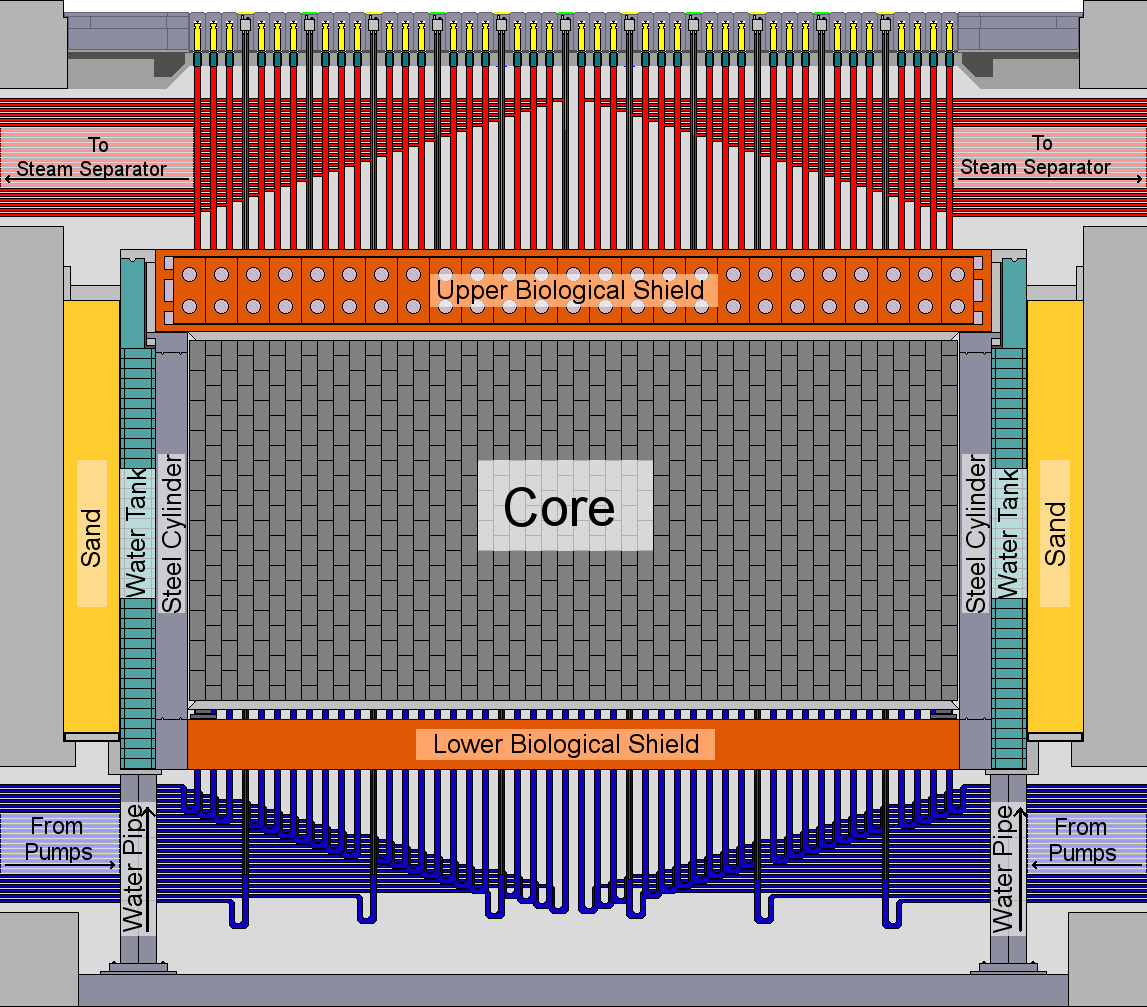
Schematic side view of the layout of an RBMK reactor core

The reactor hall and piping systems of the RBMK reactor

The reactor pit or vault is made of reinforced concrete and has dimensions 21.6 by 21.6 by 25.5 metres (71 ft × 71 ft × 84 ft). It houses the vessel of the reactor, which is annular, made of an inner and outer cylindrical wall and top and bottom metal plates that cover the space between the inner and outer walls, without covering the space surrounded by the vessel. The reactor vessel is an annular steel cylinder with hollow walls and pressurized with nitrogen gas, with an inner diameter and height of 14.5 by 9.7 metres (48 ft × 32 ft), and a wall thickness of 16 millimetres (0.63 in).

In order to absorb axial thermal expansion loads, it is equipped with two annular bellows compensators, one on the top and another on the bottom, in the spaces between the inner and outer walls. The vessel surrounds the graphite core block stack, which serves as moderator. The graphite stack is kept in a helium-nitrogen mixture, providing an inert atmosphere for the graphite, protecting it from potential fires, and facilitating transfer of excess heat from the graphite to the coolant channels.

The moderator blocks are made of nuclear graphite, the dimensions of which are 25 by 25 centimetres (9.8 in × 9.8 in) on the plane perpendicular to the channels, and with several longitudinal dimensions of between 20 centimetres (7.9 in) and 60 centimetres (24 in) depending on the location in the stack. There are holes of 11.4 centimetres (4.5 in) diameter through the longitudinal axis of the blocks for the fuel and control channels. The blocks are stacked, surrounded by the reactor vessel into a cylindrical core with a diameter and height of 14 by 8 metres (46 ft × 26 ft). The maximum allowed temperature of the graphite is up to 730 °C (1,350 °F).

The reactor has an active core region 11.8 metres (39 ft) in diameter by 7 metres (23 ft) height. There are 1700 tons of graphite blocks in an RBMK-1000 reactor. The pressurized nitrogen in the vessel prevents the escape of the helium-nitrogen mixture used to cool the graphite stack.

The reactor vessel has on its outer side an integral cylindrical annular water tank, a welded structure with 3 cm thick walls, an inner diameter of 16.6 m and an outer diameter of 19 m, internally divided to 16 vertical compartments. The water is supplied to the compartments from the bottom and removed from the top; the water can be used for emergency reactor cooling. The tank contains thermocouples for sensing the water temperature and ion chambers for monitoring the reactor power. The tank, along with an annular sand layer between the outer side of the tank and inner side of the pit, and the relatively thick concrete of the reactor pit serve as lateral biological shields.

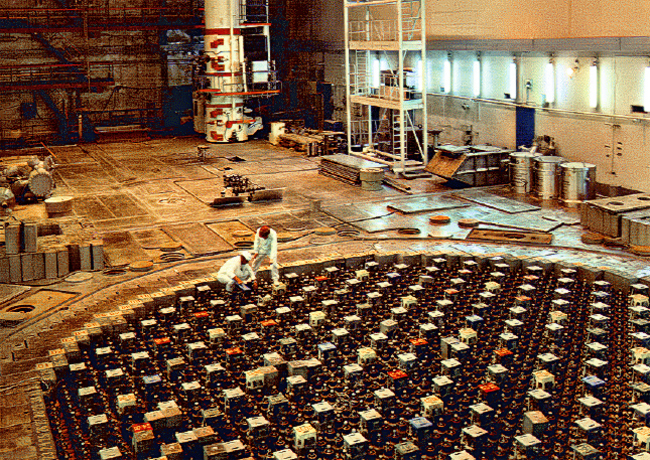
Reactor hall of the RBMK-1500 at Ignalina Nuclear Power Plant, Lithuania—the upper biological shield (UBS) lies several meters below the floor of the reactor hall. There are no channel covers on the fuel channels of the reactor; the control rod drives are below the colored covers.

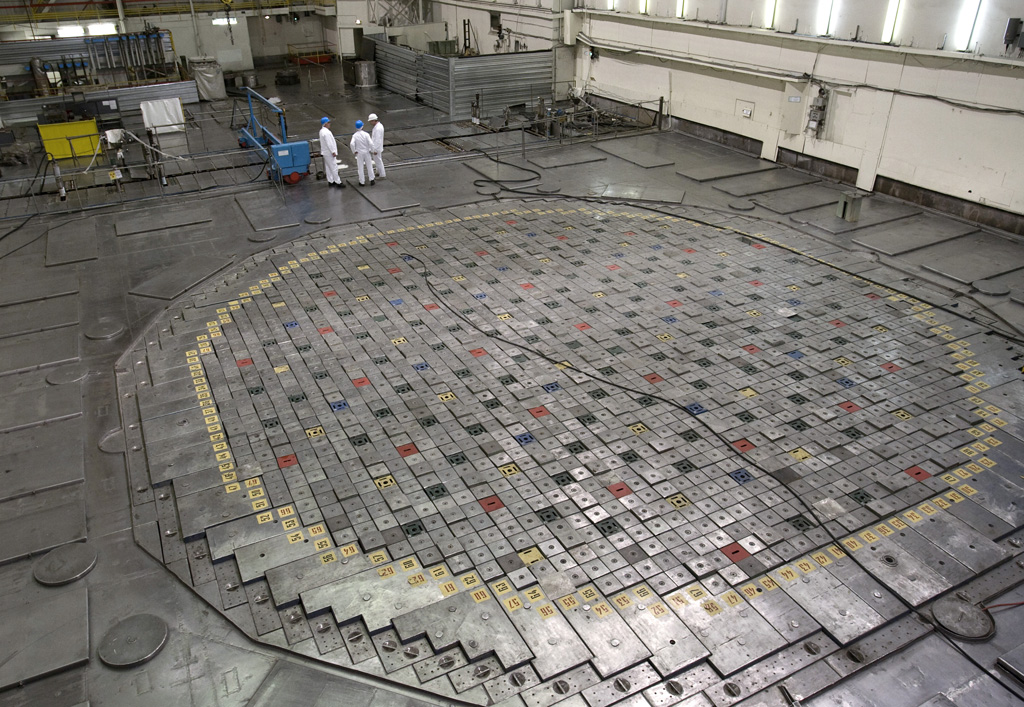
RBMK reactor with fuel channel covers

The top of the reactor is covered by the upper biological shield (UBS), also called "Schema E", or, after the explosion of Chernobyl Reactor 4, Elena. The UBS is a cylindrical disc of 3 m × 17 m in size and 2000 tons in weight. It is penetrated by standpipes for fuel and control channel assemblies. The top and bottom are covered with 4 cm thick steel plates, welded to be helium-tight, and additionally joined by structural supports. The space between the plates and pipes is filled with serpentinite, a rock containing significant amounts of bound water. The serpentinite provides the radiation shielding of the biological shield and was applied as a special concrete mixture. The disk is supported on 16 rollers, located on the upper side of the reinforced cylindrical water tank. The structure of the UBS supports the fuel and control channels, the floor above the reactor in the central hall, and the steam-water pipes. In large part due to the shielding provided by the UBS, the reactor (refueling) hall can be safely accessed with the reactor running at full power. The dose rate directly above the reactor is less than 40 µSv/h when operating at full power, and the average in the reactor hall generally is 7 µSv/h.

Below the bottom of the reactor core there is the lower biological shield (LBS), similar to the UBS, but only 2 m × 14.5 m in size. It is penetrated by the tubes for the lower ends of the pressure channels and carries the weight of the graphite stack and the coolant inlet piping. A steel structure, two heavy plates intersecting in right angle under the center of the LBS and welded to the LBS, supports the LBS and transfers the mechanical load to the building.

Above the UBS, there is a space with upper channel piping and instrumentation and control (I&C) or control and monitoring cabling. Above that is Assembly 11, made up of the upper shield cover or channel covers. Their top surfaces form part of the floor of the reactor hall and serve as part of the biological shield and for thermal insulation of the reactor space. They consist of serpentinite concrete blocks that cover individual removable steel-graphite plugs, located over the tops of the channels, forming what resembles a circle with a grid pattern. The floor above the reactor is thus known by RBMK plant workers as pyatachok, referring to the five-kopeck coin. There is one cover (lid/block) per plug, and one plug per channel.

=== Fuel channels ===
The fuel channels consist of welded zircaloy pressure tubes 8.4 cm in inner diameter with 4 mm thick walls, led through the channels in the center of the graphite moderator blocks. The top and bottom parts of the tubes are made of stainless steel, and joined with the central zircaloy segment with zirconium-steel alloy couplings. The pressure tube is held in the graphite stack channels with two alternating types of 20 mm high split graphite rings. One is in direct contact with the tube and has 1.5 mm clearance to the graphite stack, the other one is directly touching the graphite stack and has 1.3 mm clearance to the tube. This assembly reduces transfer of mechanical loads caused by neutron-induced swelling, thermal expansion of the blocks, and other factors to the pressure tube, while facilitating heat transfer from the graphite blocks. The pressure tubes are welded to the top and bottom plates of the reactor vessel.

While most of the heat energy from the fission process is generated in the fuel rods, approximately 5.5% is deposited in the graphite blocks as they moderate the fast neutrons formed from fission. This energy must be removed to avoid overheating the graphite. About 80–85% of the energy deposited in the graphite is removed by the fuel rod coolant channels, using conduction via the graphite rings. The rest of the graphite heat is removed from the control rod channels by forced gas circulation through the gas circuit.

There are 1693 fuel channels and 170 control rod channels in the first generation RBMK reactor cores. Second generation reactor cores (such as Kursk and Chernobyl 3/4) have 1661 fuel channels and 211 control rod channels. The fuel assembly is suspended in the fuel channel on a bracket, with a seal plug. The seal plug has a simple design, to facilitate its removal and installation by the remotely controlled online refueling machine.

The fuel channels may, instead of fuel, contain fixed neutron absorbers, or be filled completely with cooling water. They may also contain silicon-filled tubes in place of a fuel assembly, for the purpose of doping for semiconductors. These channels could be identified by their corresponding servo readers, which would be blocked and replaced with the atomic symbol for silicon.

The small clearance between the pressure channel and the graphite block makes the graphite core susceptible to damage. If a pressure channel deforms, for example, by too high an internal pressure, the deformation can cause significant pressure loads on the graphite blocks and lead to damage.

=== Fuel ===
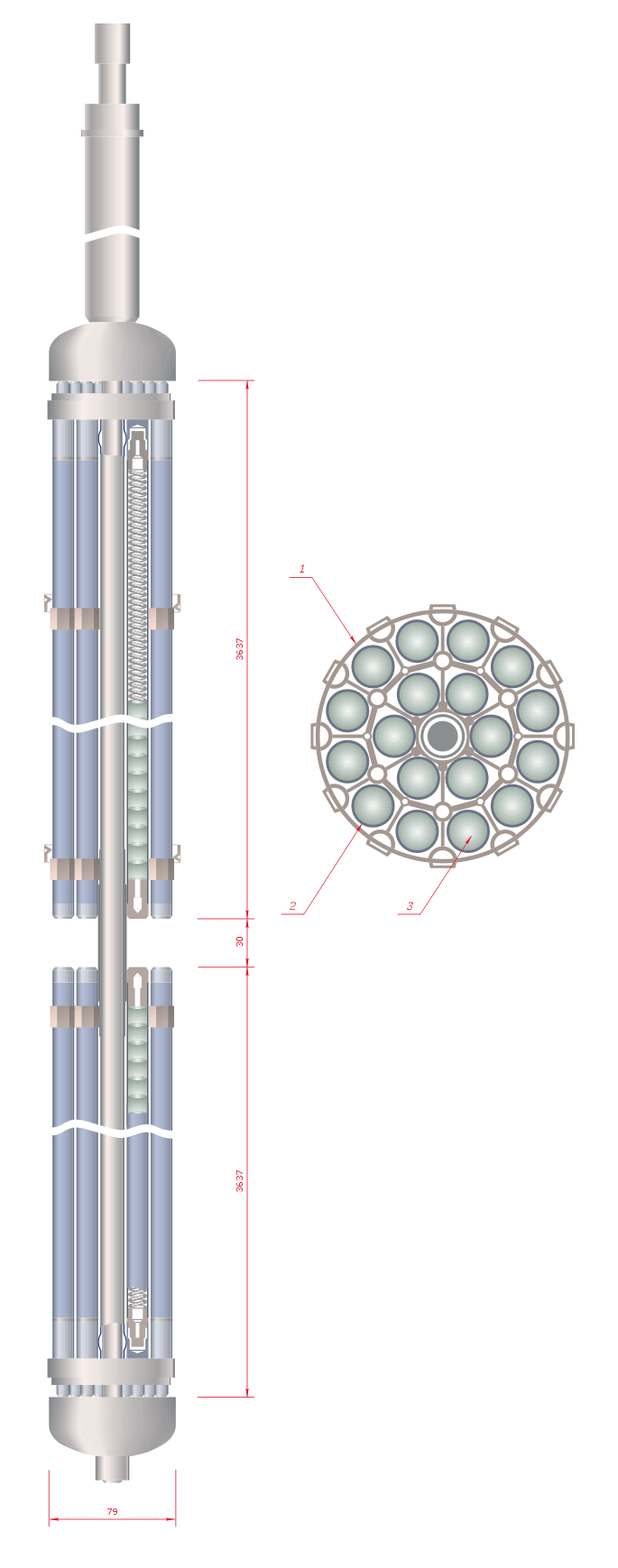
RBMK reactor fuel rod holder 1 – distancing armature; 2 – fuel rods shell; 3 – fuel tablets

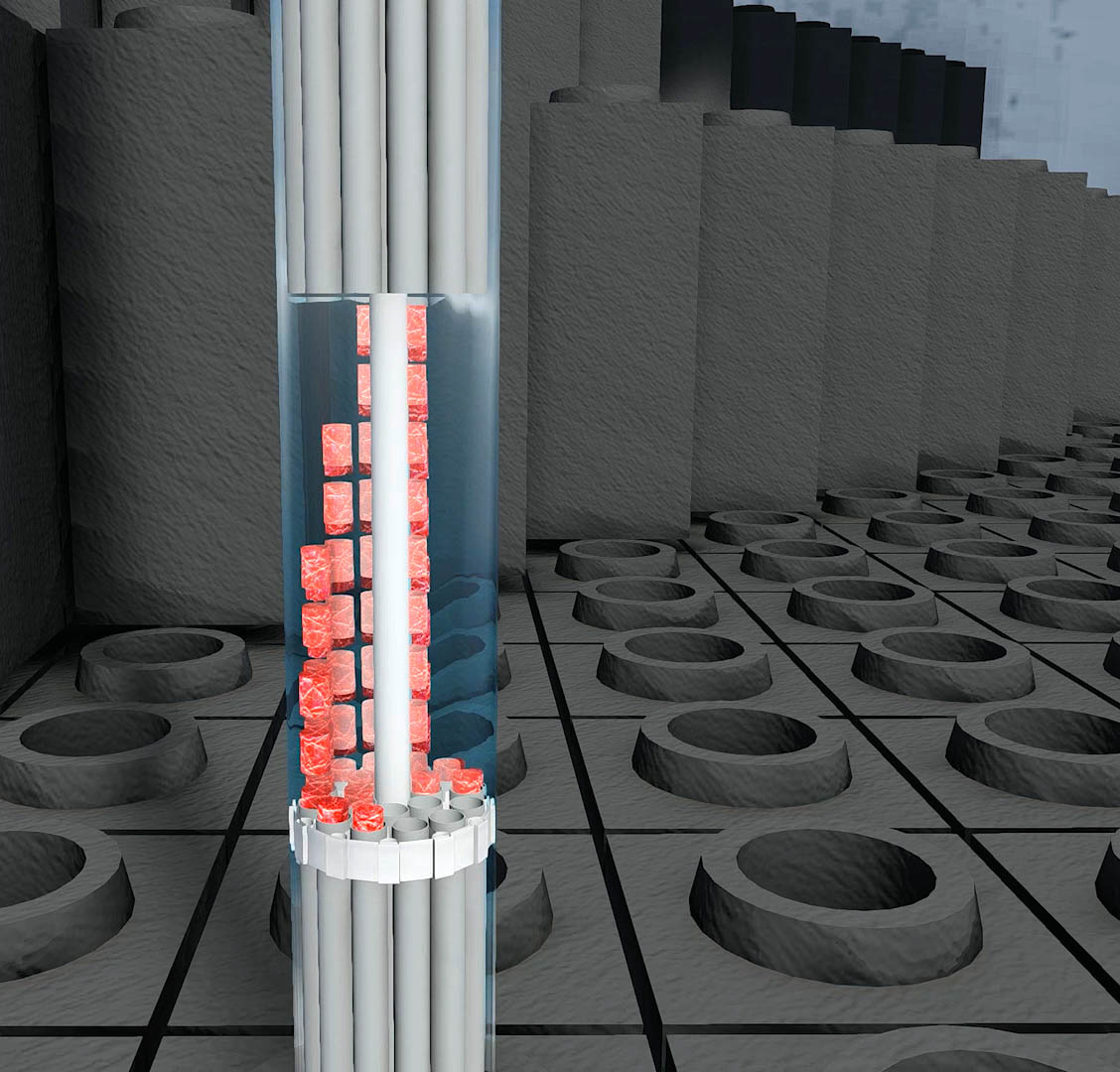
RBMK reactor fuel rod holder Uranium fuel pellets, fuel tubes, distancing armature, graphite bricks

The fuel pellets are made of uranium dioxide powder, sintered with a suitable binder into pellets 11.5 mm in diameter and 15 mm long. The material may contain added erbium oxide as a burnable nuclear poison to lower the reactivity differences between a new and partially spent fuel assembly. To reduce thermal expansion issues and interaction with the cladding, the pellets have hemispherical indentations. A 2 mm hole through the axis of the pellet serves to reduce the temperature in the center of the pellet and facilitates removal of gaseous fission products. The enrichment level in 1980 was 2% (0.4% for the end pellets of the assemblies). Maximum allowable temperature of the fuel pellet is 2100 °C.

The fuel rods are zircaloy (1% niobium) tubes 13.6 mm in outer diameter, 0.825 mm thick. The rods are filled with helium at 0.5 MPa and hermetically sealed. Retaining rings help to seat the pellets in the center of the tube and facilitate heat transfer from the pellet to the tube. The pellets are axially held in place by a spring. Each rod contains 3.5 kg of fuel pellets. The fuel rods are 3.64 m long, with 3.4 m of that being the active length. The maximum allowed temperature of a fuel rod is 600 °C.

The fuel assemblies consist of two sets ("sub-assemblies") with 18 fuel rods and 1 carrier rod. The fuel rods are arranged along the central carrier rod, which has an outer diameter of 1.3 cm. All rods of a fuel assembly are held in place with 10 stainless steel spacers separated by 360 mm distance. The two sub-assemblies are joined with a cylinder at the center of the assembly; during the operation of the reactor, this dead space without fuel lowers the neutron flux in the central plane of the reactor. The total mass of uranium in the fuel assembly is 114.7 kg. The fuel burnup is 20 MW·d/kg. This is lower than modern BWRs which have fuel burnup at around 28 MW.d/kg and the PWRs which have it at around 34 MW.d/kg. The total length of the fuel assembly is 10.025 m, with 6.862 m of the active region.

In addition to the regular fuel assemblies, there are instrumented ones, containing neutron flux detectors in the central carrier. In this case, the rod is replaced with a tube with wall thickness of 2.5 mm; and outer diameter of 15 mm.

Unlike the rectangular PWR/BWR fuel assemblies or hexagonal VVER fuel assemblies, the RBMK fuel assembly is cylindrical to fit the round pressure channels.

The refueling machine is mounted on a gantry crane and remotely controlled. The fuel assemblies can be replaced without shutting down the reactor, a factor significant for production of weapon-grade plutonium and, in a civilian context, for better reactor uptime. When a fuel assembly has to be replaced, the machine is positioned above the fuel channel: then it mates to the latter, equalizes pressure within, pulls the rod, and inserts a fresh one. The spent rod is then placed in a cooling pond. The capacity of the refueling machine with the reactor at nominal power level is two fuel assemblies per day, with peak capacity of five per day.

The total amount of fuel under stationary conditions is 192 tons. The RBMK core has a relatively low power density at least partly due to the 25 cm spacing between channels and thus fuel assemblies.

=== Control rods ===
Schematic plan view of core layout, Chernobyl RBMK reactor No. 4. (Quantity of each rod type in parentheses): neutron detector (12) control rods (167) short control rods from below reactor (32) automatic control rods (12) pressure tubes with fuel rods (1661-1691)(1-2-nd generation cores(RBMK) The numbers in the image indicate the position of the respective control rods (insertion depth in centimetres) at 01:22:30, 78 seconds before the reactor exploded.

The majority of the reactor control rods are inserted from above; 24 shortened rods are inserted from below and are used to augment the axial power distribution control of the core. With the exception of 12 automatic rods, the control rods have a 4.5 m long graphite section at the end, separated by a 1.25 m long telescope (which creates a water-filled space between the graphite and the absorber), and a boron carbide neutron absorber section. The role of the graphite section, known as "displacer", is to enhance the difference between the neutron flux attenuation levels of inserted and retracted rods, as the graphite displaces water that would otherwise act as a neutron absorber, although much weaker than boron carbide. A control rod channel filled with graphite absorbs fewer neutrons than when filled with water, so the difference between inserted and retracted control rod is increased.

When the control rod is fully retracted, the graphite displacer is located in the middle of the core height, with 1.25 m of water at each of its ends. The displacement of neutron-absorbing water as the rod moves down could cause a local increase of reactivity in the bottom of the core as the graphite part of the control rod passes that section. This "positive scram" effect was discovered in 1983 at the Ignalina Nuclear Power Plant. The control rod channels are cooled by an independent water circuit and kept at 40–70 °C.

The narrow space between the rod and its channel hinders water flow around the rods during their movement and acts as a fluid damper, which is the primary cause of their slow insertion time (nominally 18–21 seconds for the reactor control and protection system rods, or about 0.4 m/s). After the Chernobyl disaster, the control rod servos on other RBMK reactors were exchanged to allow faster rod movements, and even faster movement was achieved by cooling of the control rod channels by a thin layer of water between an inner jacket and the Zircaloy tube of the channel while letting the rods themselves move in gas.

The division of the control rods between manual and emergency protection groups was arbitrary; the rods could be reassigned from one system to another during reactor operation without technical or organizational problems.

Additional static boron-based absorbers are inserted into the core when it is loaded with fresh fuel. About 240 absorbers are added during initial core loading. These absorbers are gradually removed with increasing burnup. The reactor's void coefficient depends on the core content; it ranges from negative with all the initial absorbers to positive when they are all removed.

The normal reactivity margin is 43–48 control rods.

The control rod drives are based on a servo motor mechanism with a DC motor, reduction gearing and a synchro, which are attached to a winch mechanism, from which the control rod is suspended via a rope or tape. Unlike other types of reactors, RBMK control rod drives are not based on ball screws, hydraulics or electromagnetic linear motors. The control rod drive can be driven manually by turning a nut.

=== Gas circuit ===
The reactor operates in a helium–nitrogen atmosphere (70–90% He, 10–30% N_{2} by volume). The gas circuit is composed of a compressor, aerosol and iodine filters, adsorber for carbon dioxide, carbon monoxide, and ammonia, a holding tank for allowing the gaseous radioactive products to decay before being discharged, an aerosol filter to remove solid decay products, and a ventilator stack, the iconic chimney above the space between reactors in second generation RBMKs such as Kursk and Chernobyl 3/4 or some distance away from the reactors in first generation RBMKs such as Kursk and Chernobyl 1/2.

The gas is injected to the core stack from the bottom in a low flow rate, and exits from the standpipe of each channel via an individual pipe. The moisture and temperature of the outlet gas is monitored; an increase of them is an indicator of a coolant leak. A single gas circuit serves two RBMK-1000 reactors or a single RBMK-1500; RBMK reactors were always built in pairs. The gas circuit is housed between two reactors in second generation RBMKs such as Chernobyl 3/4, Kursk 3/4 and Smolensk 1–4.

=== Primary coolant circuit ===
Schematic view of the cooling system and turbogenerators of a RBMK power plant

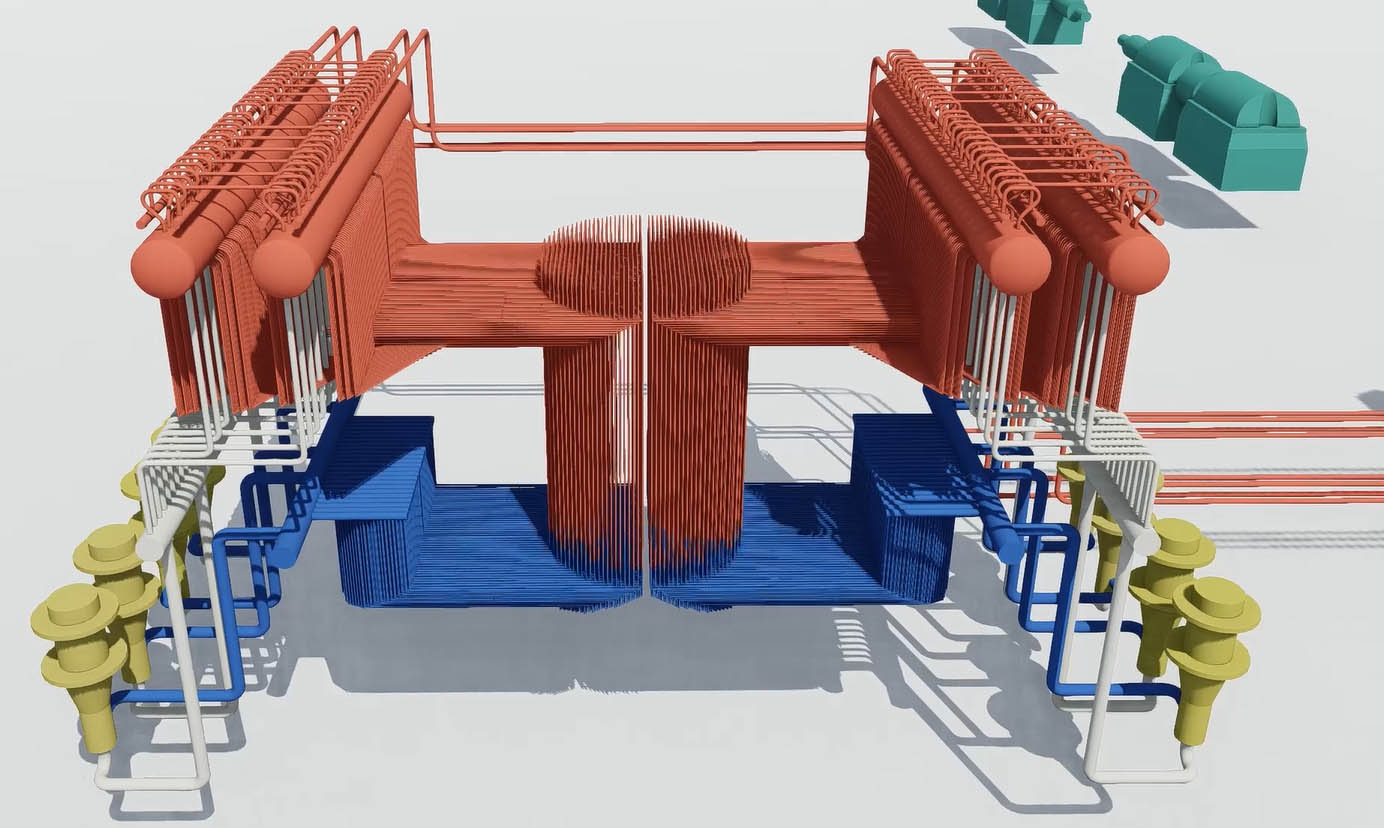
Circulation system of the RBMK illustrating the Steam separators (red), Pumps (yellow) and pipe network

The reactor has two independent cooling circuits, each having four main circulating pumps (three operating, one standby) that service one half of the reactor. The cooling water is fed to the reactor through lower water lines to a common pressure header (one for each cooling circuit), which is split to 22 group distribution headers, each feeding 38–41 pressure channels through the core, where the coolant boils. The mixture of steam and water is led by the upper steam lines, one for each pressure channel, from the reactor top to the steam separators, pairs of thick horizontal drums located in side compartments above the reactor top; each has 2.8 m (9 ft 2 in) diameter, 31 m (101 ft 8 in) length, wall thickness of 10 cm (3.9 in), and weighs 240 t (260 short tons).

Steam, with steam quality of about 15%, is taken from the top of the separators by two steam collectors per separator, combined, and led to two turbogenerators in the turbine hall, then to condensers, reheated to 165 °C (329 °F), and pumped by the condensate pumps to deaerators, where remains of gaseous phase and corrosion-inducing gases are removed. The resulting feedwater is led to the steam separators by feedwater pumps and mixed with water from them at their outlets. From the bottom of the steam separators, the feedwater is led by 12 downpipes (from each separator) to the suction headers of the main circulation pumps, and back into the reactor. There is an ion exchange system included in the loop to remove impurities from the feedwater.

The turbine consists of one high-pressure rotor (cylinder) and four low-pressure ones. Five low-pressure separators-preheaters are used to heat steam with fresh steam before being fed to the next stage of the turbine. The uncondensed steam is fed into a condenser, mixed with condensate from the separators, fed by the first-stage condensate pump to a chemical (ion-exchange) purifier, then by a second-stage condensate pump to four deaerators where dissolved and entrained gases are removed; deaerators also serve as storage tanks for feedwater. From the deaerators, the water is pumped through filters and into the bottom parts of the steam separator drums.

The main circulating pumps have the capacity of 5,500–12,000 m^{3}/h and are powered by 6 kV electric motors. The normal coolant flow is 8000 m^{3}/h per pump; this is throttled down by control valves to 6,000–7,000 m^{3}/h when the reactor power is below 500 MWt. Each pump has a flow control valve and a backflow preventing check valve on the outlet, and shutoff valves on both inlet and outlet. Each of the pressure channels in the core has its own flow control valve so that the temperature distribution in the reactor core can be optimized. Each channel has a ball type flow meter.

The nominal coolant flow through the reactor is 46,000–48,000 m^{3}/h. The steam flow at full power is 5,440–5,600 t (6,000–6,170 short tons)/h.

The nominal temperature of the coolant at the inlet of the reactor is about 265–270 °C (509–518 °F) and the outlet temperature 284 °C (543 °F), at pressure in the drum separator and reactor of 6.9 megapascals (69 bar; 1,000 psi). The pressure and the inlet temperature determine the height at which the boiling begins in the reactor; if the coolant temperature is not sufficiently below its boiling point at the system pressure, the boiling starts at the very bottom part of the reactor instead of its higher parts. With few absorbers in the reactor core, such as during the Chernobyl accident, the positive void coefficient of the reactor makes the reactor very sensitive to the feedwater temperature. Bubbles of boiling water lead to increased power, which in turn increases the formation of bubbles.

If the coolant temperature is too close to its boiling point, cavitation can occur in the pumps and their operation can become erratic or even stop entirely. The feedwater temperature is dependent on the steam production; the steam phase portion is led to the turbines and condensers and returns significantly cooler (155–165 °C (311–329 °F)) than the water returning directly from the steam separator (284 °C). At low reactor power, therefore, the inlet temperature may become dangerously high. The water is kept below the saturation temperature to prevent film boiling and the associated drop in heat transfer rate.

The reactor is tripped in cases of high or low water level in the steam separators (with two selectable low-level thresholds); high steam pressure; low feedwater flow; loss of two main coolant pumps on either side. These trips can be manually disabled.

The level of water in the steam separators, the percentage of steam in the reactor pressure tubes, the level at which the water begins to boil in the reactor core, the neutron flux and power distribution in the reactor, and the feedwater flow through the core have to be carefully controlled. The level of water in the steam separator is mainly controlled by the feedwater supply, with the deaerator tanks serving as a water reservoir.

The maximum allowed heat-up rate of the reactor and the coolant is 10 °C (18 °F)/h; the maximum cool-down rate is 30 °C (54 °F)/h.

=== Emergency reactor cooling system ===
The reactor is equipped with an emergency core cooling system (ECCS), consisting of dedicated water reserve tank, hydraulic accumulators, and pumps. ECCS piping is integrated with the normal reactor cooling system. The ECCS has three systems, connected to the coolant system headers. In case of damage, the first ECCS subsystem provides cooling for up to 100 seconds to the damaged half of the coolant circuit (the other half is cooled by the main circulation pumps), and the other two subsystems then handle long-term cooling of the reactor.

The short-term ECCS subsystem consists of two groups of six accumulator tanks, containing water blanketed with nitrogen under pressure of 10 megapascals (1,500 psi), connected by fast-acting valves to the reactor. Each group can supply 50% of the maximum coolant flow to the damaged half of the reactor. The third group is a set of electrical pumps drawing water from the deaerators. The short-term pumps can be powered by the spindown of the main turbogenerators.

ECCS for long-term cooling of the damaged circuit consists of three pairs of electrical pumps, drawing water from the pressure suppression pools; the water is cooled by the plant service water by means of heat exchangers in the suction lines. Each pair is able to supply half of the maximum coolant flow. ECCS for long-term cooling of the intact circuit consists of three separate pumps drawing water from the condensate storage tanks, each able to supply half of the maximum flow. The ECCS pumps are powered from the essential internal 6 kV lines, backed up by diesel generators. Some valves that require uninterrupted power are also backed up by batteries.

=== Reactor control and supervision systems ===
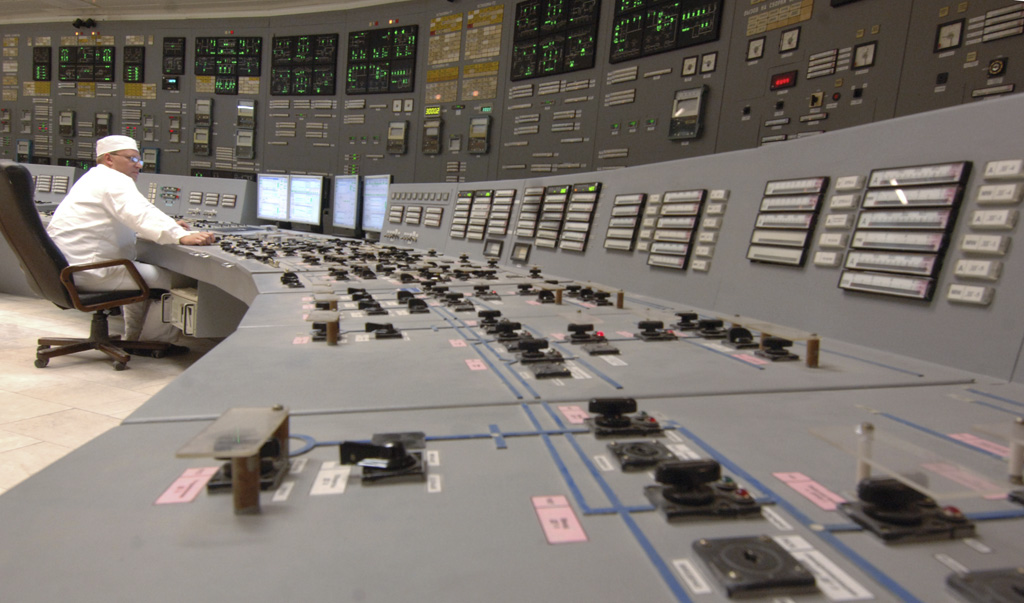
The control room of a first generation RBMK at Kursk Nuclear Power Plant

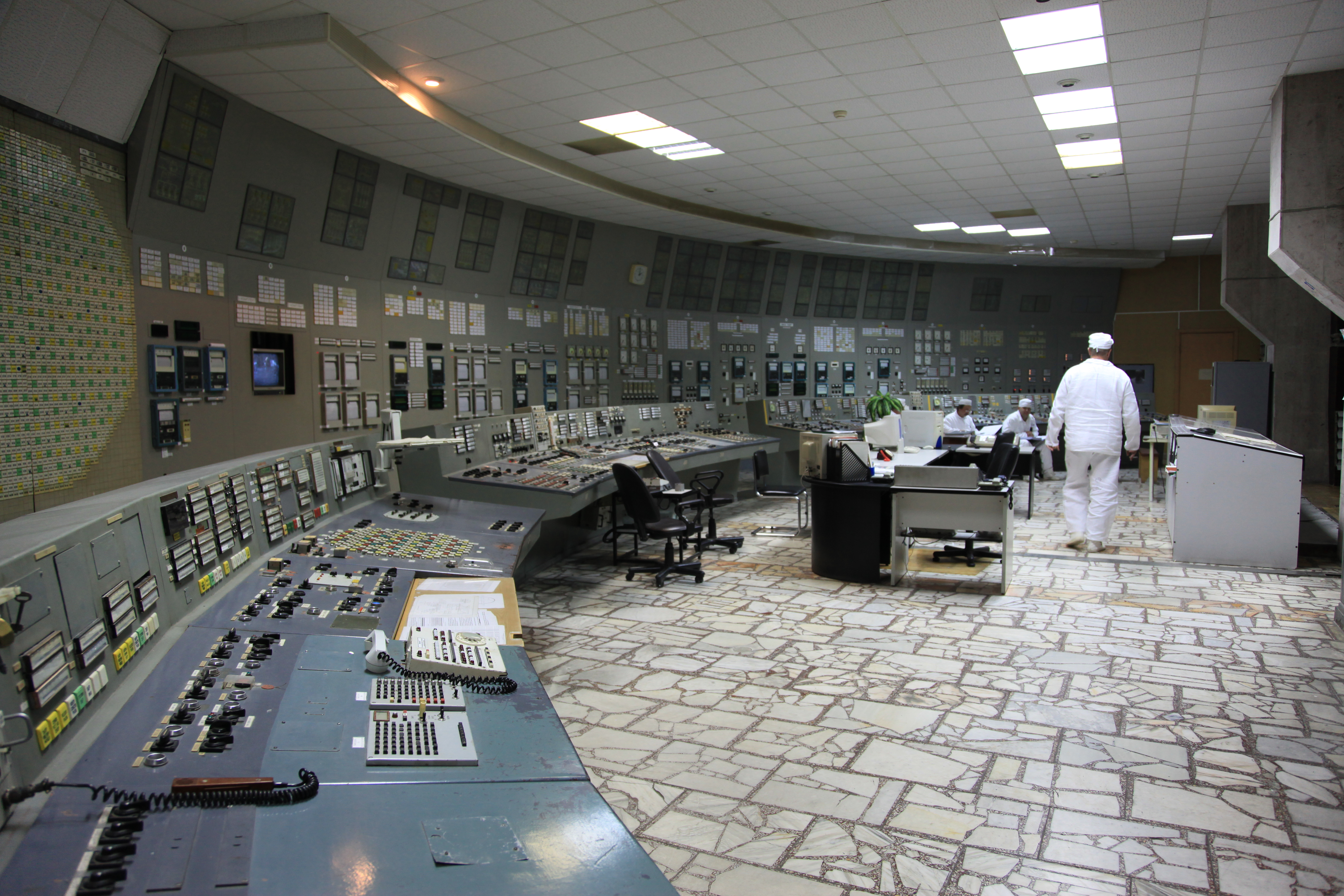
The control room of Chernobyl Unit 3, a second generation RBMK, and twin of Chernobyl Unit 4. A large circular mimic display for every channel or core map is on the left.

The distribution of power density in the reactor is measured by ionization chambers located inside and outside the core. The physical power density distribution control system (PPDDCS) has sensors inside the core; the reactor control and protection system (RCPS) uses sensors in the core and in the lateral biological shield tank. The external sensors in the tank are located around the reactor middle plane, therefore do not indicate axial power distribution nor information about the power in the central part of the core.

There are over 100 radial and 12 axial power distribution monitors, employing self-powered detectors. Reactivity meters and removable startup chambers are used for monitoring of reactor startup. Total reactor power is recorded as the sum of the currents of the lateral ionization chambers. The moisture and temperature of the gas circulating in the channels is monitored by the pressure tube integrity monitoring system.

The PPDDCS and RCPS are supposed to complement each other. The RCPS system consists of 211 movable control rods. Both systems, however, have deficiencies, most noticeably at low reactor power levels. The PPDDCS is designed to maintain reactor power density distribution between 10 and 120% of nominal levels and to control the total reactor power between 5 and 120% of nominal levels. The LAC-LAP (local automatic control and local automatic protection) RPCS subsystems rely on ionization chambers inside the reactor and are active at power levels above 10%.

Below those levels, the automatic systems are disabled and the in-core sensors are not accessible. Without the automatic systems and relying only on the lateral ionization chambers, control of the reactor becomes very difficult; the operators do not have sufficient data to control the reactor reliably and have to rely on their intuition. During startup of a reactor with a poison-free core this lack of information can be manageable because the reactor behaves predictably, but a non-uniformly poisoned core can cause large nonhomogenities of power distribution, with potentially catastrophic results.

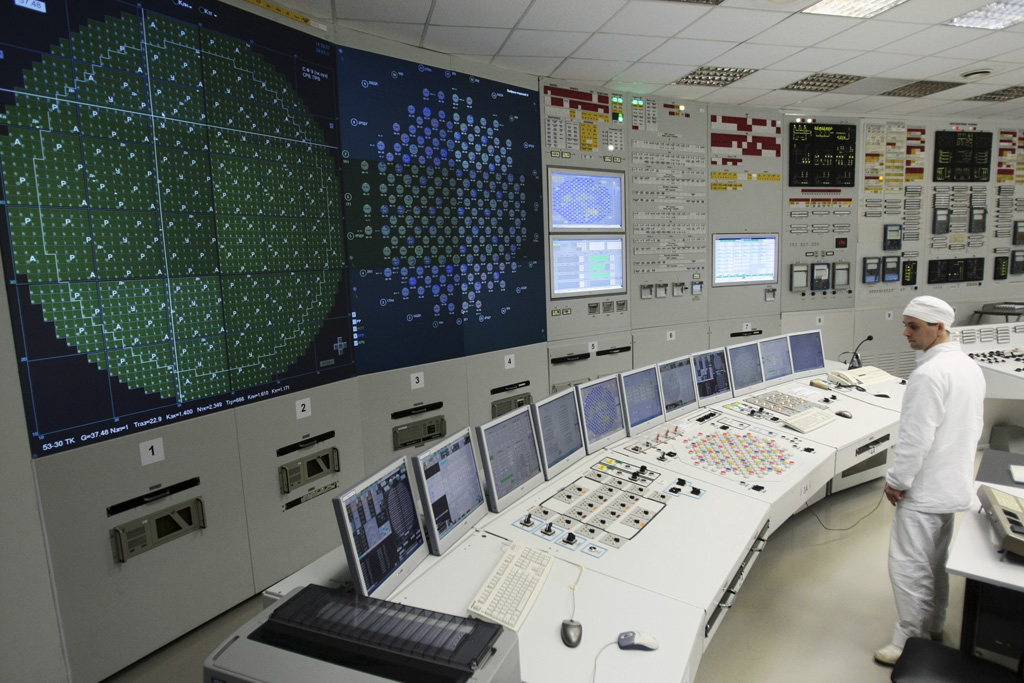
A modernized control center of RBMK reactor in Leningrad NPP

The reactor emergency protection system (EPS) was designed to shut down the reactor when its operational parameters are exceeded. The design accounted for steam collapse in the core when the fuel element temperature falls below 265 °C, coolant vaporization in fuel channels in cold reactor state, and sticking of some emergency protection rods. However, the slow insertion speed of the control rods, together with their design causing localized positive reactivity as the displacer moves through the lower part of the core, created a number of possible situations where initiation of the EPS could itself cause or aggravate a reactor runaway.

The SKALA or SCALA computer system for calculation of the reactivity margin was collecting data from about 4,000 sources. Its purpose was to assist the operator with steady-state control of the reactor. Ten to fifteen minutes were required to cycle through all the measurements and calculate the results. SKALA could not control the reactor, instead it only made recommendations to the operators, and it used 1960s computer technology.

The operators could disable some safety systems, reset or suppress some alarm signals, and bypass automatic scram, by attaching patch cables to accessible terminals. This practice was allowed under some circumstances.

The reactor is equipped with a fuel rod leak detector. A scintillation counter detector, sensitive to energies of short-lived fission products, is mounted on a special dolly and moved over the outlets of the fuel channels, issuing an alert if increased radioactivity is detected in the steam-water flow.

In RBMK control rooms there are two large panels or mimic displays representing a top view of the reactor. One display is made up mostly or completely (in first generation RBMKs) of colored dials or rod position indicators: these dials represent the position of the control rods inside the reactor and the color of the housing of the dials matches that of the control rods, whose colors correspond to their function, for example, red for automatic control rods. The other display is a core map or core channel cartogram and is circular, is made of tiles, and represents every channel on the reactor. Each tile is made of a single light cover with a channel number and an incandescent light bulb, and each light bulb illuminates to represent out-of-spec (higher or lower than normal) channel parameters.

Operators have to type in the number of the affected channel(s) and then view the instruments to find exactly what parameters are out of spec. The core map represented information from the SKALA computer. Each unit had its own computer housed in a separate room. The control room also has chart or trend recorders. Some RBMK control rooms have been upgraded with video walls that replace the mimic displays and most chart recorders and eliminate the need to type in channel numbers and instead operators lay a cursor over a (now representative) tile to reveal its parameters that are shown on the lower side of the video wall. The control room is located below the floor of the deaerator room. Both rooms are in the space between the reactor and turbine buildings.

According to Unit 3 of Smolensk NPP, the reactor shutdown consists of (1) system of fast-acting emergency protection (BAZ) and (2) system of emergency protection (AZ-1). The BAZ has normally-withdrawn 24 fast acting scram rod. Meanwhile, AZ-1 has 32 bottom rods (bottom-inserted rods for axial power shaping), 9 local power regulation rods (automatically flux monitor-controlled for 9 local control zones), 18 local protection rods (2 rods for each local control zones, inserted if local power go beyond 10% preset or go beyond 2% preset accompanied by AZ-3 or AZ-4 modes), and 128 manual control rods.

=== Containment ===
The RBMK design was built primarily to be powerful, quick to build and easy to maintain. Full physical containment structures for each reactor would have more than doubled the cost and construction time of each plant, and since the design had been certified by the Soviet nuclear science ministry as inherently safe when operated within established parameters, the Soviet authorities assumed proper adherence to doctrine by workers would make any accident impossible. RBMK reactors were designed to allow fuel rods to be changed at full power without shutting down, as in the pressurized heavy water CANDU reactor, and the Indian IPHWR reactor, both for refueling and for plutonium production for nuclear weapons. This required large cranes above the core.

As the RBMK reactor core is very tall (about 7 m (23 ft 0 in)), the cost and difficulty of building a heavy containment structure prevented the building of additional emergency containment structures for pipes on top of the reactor core. In the Chernobyl accident, the pressure rose to levels high enough to blow the top off the reactor, breaking open the fuel channels in the process and starting a massive fire when air contacted the superheated graphite core. After the Chernobyl accident, some of the older RBMK reactors were retrofitted with an accident containment system, akin to that later added to Chernobyl Unit 4 after its destruction.

The bottom part of the reactor is enclosed in a watertight compartment. There is a space between the reactor bottom and the floor, which is serviceable. The space contains a cross-shaped steel buttress support structure for the lower biological shield which extends into the floor, and pipes that penetrate the lower biological shield for each channel, to provide cooling water. The reactor cavity overpressure protection system consists of steam relief assemblies embedded in the floor and leading to Steam Distributor Headers covered with rupture discs and opening into the Steam Distribution Corridor below the reactor, on level +6. The floor of the corridor contains entrances of a large number of vertical pipes, leading to the bottoms of the Pressure Suppression Pools ("bubbler" pools) located on levels +3 and +0. In the event of an accident, which was predicted to be at most a rupture of one or two pressure channels, the steam was to be bubbled through the water and condensed there, reducing the overpressure in the leaktight compartment. The flow capacity of the pipes to the pools limited the protection capacity to simultaneous rupture of two pressure channels; a higher number of failures would cause pressure buildup sufficient to lift the cover plate ("Structure E", after the explosion nicknamed "Elena", not to be confused with the Russian ELENA reactor), sever the rest of the fuel channels, destroy the control rod insertion system, and potentially also withdraw control rods from the core.

The containment was designed to handle failures of the downcomers, pumps, and distribution and inlet of the feedwater. The leaktight compartments around the pumps can withstand overpressure of 0.45 MPa (65 psi). The distribution headers and inlets enclosures can handle 0.08 MPa (12 psi) and are vented via check valves to the leaktight compartment. The reactor cavity can handle overpressure of 0.18 MPa (26 psi) and is vented via check valves to the leaktight compartment. The pressure suppression system can handle a failure of one reactor channel, a pump pressure header, or a distribution header.

Leaks in the steam piping and separators are not handled, except for maintaining slightly lower pressure in the riser pipe gallery and the steam drum compartment than in the reactor hall. These spaces are also not designed to withstand overpressure. The steam distribution corridor contains surface condensers. The fire sprinkler systems, operating during both accident and normal operation, are fed from the pressure suppression pools through heat exchangers cooled by the plant service water, and cool the air above the pools. Jet coolers are located in the topmost parts of the compartments; their role is to cool the air and remove the steam and radioactive aerosol particles.

Hydrogen removal from the leaktight compartment is performed by removal of 800 m^{3} (28,000 cu ft)/hour of air, its filtration, and discharge into the atmosphere. The air removal is stopped automatically in case of a coolant leak and has to be reinstated manually. Hydrogen is present during normal operation due to leaks of coolant (assumed to be up to 2 t (2.2 short tons) per hour).

=== Other systems ===
For the nuclear systems described here, the Chernobyl Nuclear Power Plant is used as the example.

==== Electrical systems ====
The power plant is connected to the 330 kV and 750 kV electrical grid. The block has two electrical generators connected to the 750 kV grid by a single generator transformer. The generators are connected to their common transformer by two switches in series. Between them, the unit transformers are connected to supply power to the power plant's own systems; each generator can therefore be connected to the unit transformer to power the plant, or to the unit transformer and the generator transformer to also feed power to the grid. The 330 kV line is normally not used, and serves as an external power supply, connected by a station transformer to the power plant's electrical systems.

The plant can be powered by its own generators, or get power from the 750 kV grid through the generator transformer, or from the 330 kV grid via the station transformer, or from the other power plant block via two reserve busbars. In case of total external power loss, the essential systems can be powered by diesel generators. Each unit transformer is connected to two 6 kV main power boards, A and B (e.g. 7A, 7B, 8A, 8B for generators 7 and 8), powering principal non-essential drivers and connected to transformers for the 4 kV main power and the 4 kV reserve busbar.

The 7A, 7B, and 8B boards are also connected to the three essential power lines, namely for the coolant pumps, each also having its own diesel generator. In case of a coolant circuit failure with simultaneous loss of external power, the essential power can be supplied by the spinning down turbogenerators for about 45–50 seconds, during which time the diesel generators should start up. The generators are started automatically within 15 seconds at loss of off-site power.

==== Turbogenerators ====
The electrical energy is generated by a pair of 500 MW hydrogen-cooled turbogenerators. These are located in the 600 m (1,968 ft 6 in)-long machine hall, adjacent to the reactor building. The turbines, the venerable five-cylinder K-500-65/3000, are supplied by the Kharkiv turbine plant. The electrical generators are the TVV-500. The turbine and the generator rotors are mounted on the same shaft. The combined weight of the rotors is almost 200 t (220 short tons) and their nominal rotational speed is 3000 rpm.

The turbogenerator is 39 m (127 ft 11 in) long and its total weight is 1,200 t (1,300 short tons). The coolant flow for each turbine is 82,880 t (91,360 short tons)/h. The generator produces 20 kV 50 Hz AC power. The generator's stator is cooled by water while its rotor is cooled by hydrogen. The hydrogen for the generators is manufactured on-site by electrolysis. The design and reliability of the turbines earned them the State Prize of Ukraine for 1979.

The Kharkiv turbine plant (now Turboatom) later developed a new version of the turbine, K-500-65/3000-2, in an attempt to reduce use of valuable metal. The Chernobyl plant was equipped with both types of turbines; Block 4 had the newer ones.

=== Design variants ===
==== RBMK-1500 ====
The primary difference between RBMK-1000 and RBMK-1500 reactors is that the RBMK-1500 is cooled with less water, which adopts a helical laminar flow instead of a linear laminar flow through the channels. The RBMK-1500 also uses less uranium. The helical flow is created by turbulators in the fuel assembly and increases heat removal. RBMK-1500 has increased coolant flow of the core. Because of the RBMK's positive void coefficient, the reduced cooling water volume causes a higher power output. As the name suggests, it was designed for an electrical power output of 1500 MW. The only reactors of this type and power output are the ones at Ignalina Nuclear Power Plant.

==== RBMK-2000 and RBMK-3600 ====
The RBMK-2000 and RBMK-3600 were designed to produce 2000 and 3600 MW of electrical power respectively. The RBMK-2000 would have had an increased channel diameter and number of fuel rods per fuel assembly while maintaining the same dimensions of the reactor core as the RBMK-1000 and RBMK-1500. The RBMK-3600 presumably similarly to the RBMK-1500 would have added turbulators to the RBMK-2000 design to increase heat removal.

==== RBMKP-2400 ====
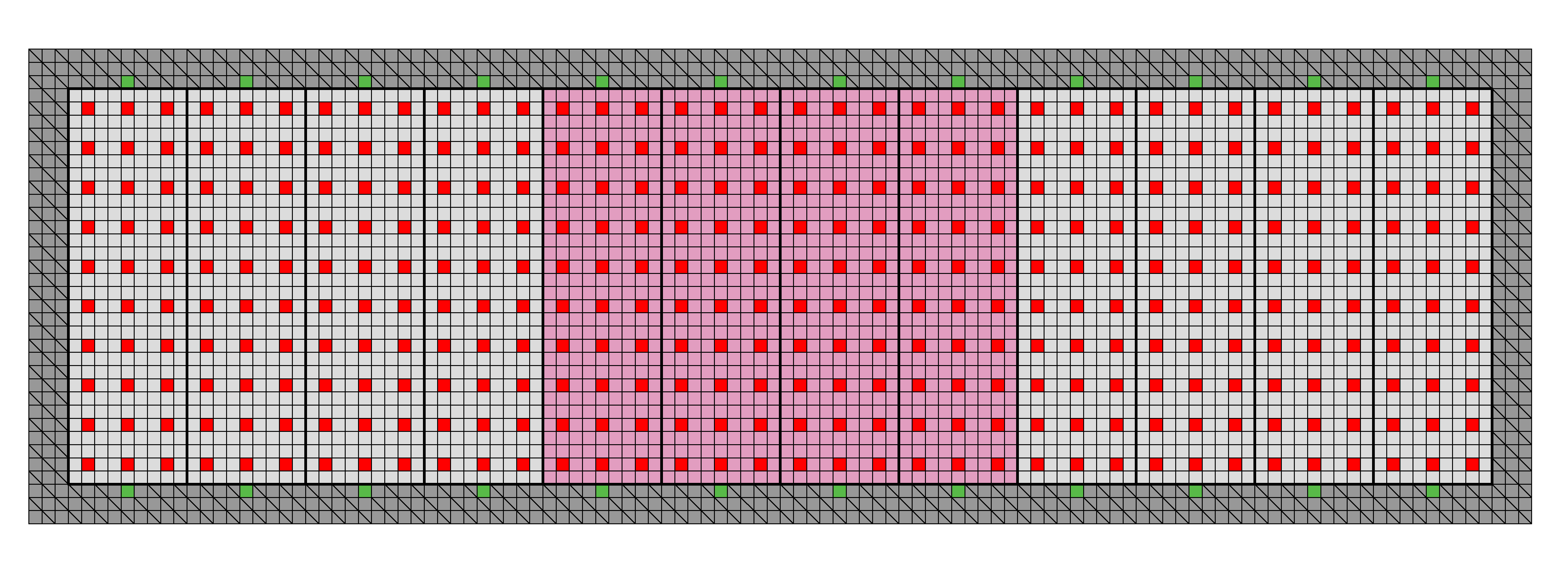
RBMKP-2400 reactor channel

The RBMKP-2400 (РБМКП-2400) is rectangular instead of cylindrical, and it was a modular, theoretically infinitely longitudinally expandable design with vertical steam separators, intended to be made in sections at a factory for assembly in situ. It was designed to have a power output of 2400 MWe, and a higher thermal efficiency due to steam superheating directly in the reactor core in special fuel channels with fuel rods with stainless steel cladding instead of the more common Zircaloy cladding, for a steam outlet temperature of 450 °C. No reactor with this power output has ever been built, with the most powerful one currently being as of 2018 the 1750 MWe EPR. The development of this design was cancelled in the aftermath of the Chernobyl disaster. An RBMKP-4800 would have had an increased number of evaporating and superheating channels thus increasing power output. Two RBMKP-2400s were planned for the Kostroma Nuclear Power Plant.

=== Technical specifications ===
Technical specifications of RBMK
Characteristics	RBMK-1000	RBMK-1500	RBMK-2000	RBMK-3600	RBMKP-2400	RBMKP-4800
References						
Thermal power of the reactor, MW	3200	4800			5400	
Electrical capacity of the unit, MW	1000	1500	2000	3600	2400	4800
Unit efficiency (gross), %	31.25	31.25			37.04	
Steam pressure in front of the turbine, atm	65	65			65	
Steam temperature in front of the turbine, °C	280	280			450	
Dimensions active zone, m:						
— height	7	7			7.05	
— diameter (width×length)	11.8	11.8			7.05×25.38	
Uranium loading, t	192	189			220	
Enrichment, % ^{235}U						
— evaporation channel	2.6-3.0	2.6-2.8			1.8	
— superheating channel					2.2	
Number of channels:						
— evaporative	22.5	25.4			20.2	
— superheating					18.9	
Average burnup, MWd/kg						
— in the evaporation channel	22.5	25.4			20.2	
— in the superheating duct					18.9	
Fuel shell dimensions (diameter×thickness), mm:						
— evaporation channel	13.5×0.9	13.5×0.9			13.5×0.9	
— superheating channel					10×0.3	
Fuel element shell material:						
— evaporation channel	Zr + 2.5% Nb	Zr + 2.5% Nb			Zr + 2.5% Nb	
— superheating channel					Stainless steel	
Number of fuel rods in the cassette	18	18				
Number of cassettes	1693	1661				

=== Terminology ===
Terminology in RBMK
Russian			English	Note
Initialism	Full term	Latin transcription	English	Note
АВР	автоматический ввод резерва	avtomaticheskiy vvod rezerva	automatic transfer switch	
АЗ	аварийная защита	avariynaya zashchita	emergency protection	
АЗ	активная зона	aktivnaya zona	nuclear reactor core	
АЗ-1	аварийная защита 1	avariynaya zashchita 1	emergency protection 1	reducing the reactor power to 60% of the nominal power
АЗ-2	аварийная защита 2	avariynaya zashchita 2	emergency protection 2	reducing the reactor power to 50% of the nominal power
АЗ-5	аварийная защита 5	avariynaya zashchita 5	emergency protection 5 (scram)	emergency protection system installed in power units with RBMK reactors
АЗМ	аварийная защита (сигнал) по превышению мощности	avariynaya zashchita (signal) po prevysheniyu moshchnosti	emergency protection (signal) for excess power	
АЗММ	аварийная защита (сигнал) по диапазону малой мощности	avariynaya zashchita (signal) po diapazonu maloy moshchnosti	emergency protection (signal) for low power range	
АЗРТ	аварийная защита реакторной установки по технологическим параметрам (система)	avariynaya zashchita reaktornoy ustanovki po tekhnologicheskim parametram (sistema)	emergency protection of a reactor plant based on technological parameters (system)	
АЗС	аварийная защита (сигнал) по высокой температуре	avariynaya zashchita (signal) po vysokoy temperature	high temperature alarm	
АЗС-П	аварийная защита по аварийному увеличению скорости нарастания мощности в пусковом диапазоне	avariynaya zashchita po avariynomu uvelicheniyu skorosti narastaniya moshchnosti v puskovom diapazone	emergency protection for emergency increase in the rate of power increase in the starting range	
АЗС-Р	аварийная защита по скорости в рабочем диапазоне мощности реактора	avariynaya zashchita po skorosti v rabochem diapazone moshchnosti reaktora	emergency protection for speed in the operating range of reactor power	
АИС	автоматизированная измерительная система	avtomatizirovannaya izmeritel'naya sistema	automated measuring system	
АПН	аварийный питательный насос	avariynyy pitatel'nyy nasos	emergency feed pump	
АР	автоматический регулятор	avtomaticheskiy regulyator	automatic regulator	
АСКРО	автоматизированная система контроля радиационной обстановки	avtomatizirovannaya sistema kontrolya radiatsionnoy obstanovki	automated radiation monitoring system	
АСУТП	автоматизированная система управления технологическими процессами	avtomatizirovannaya sistema upravleniya tekhnologicheskimi protsessami	automated process control system	
БАЗ	быстродействующая аварийная защита	bystrodeystvuyushchaya avariynaya zashchita	fast-acting emergency protection	BAZ
ББ	бассейн-барботер	basseyn-barboter	bubbler pool	
БИК	боковая ионизационная камера	bokovaya ionizatsionnaya kamera	side ionization chamber	
БОУ	блочная обессоливающая установка	blochnaya obessolivayushchaya ustanovka	block desalination plant	
БПВ	бак питательной воды	bak pitatel'noy vody	feedwater tank	
БПУ	блочная панель управления	blochnaya panel' upravleniya	block control panel	
БРУ-Б	быстродействующее редукционное устройство со сбросом в барботер	bystrodeystvuyushcheye reduktsionnoye ustroystvo so sbrosom v barboter	steam relief valve for steam discharge to accident localization system tower (bubbler)	
БРУ-Д	быстродействующее редукционное устройство со сбросом в деаэратор	bystrodeystvuyushcheye reduktsionnoye ustroystvo so sbrosom v deaerator	steam relief valve for steam discharge to deaerator	
БРУ-К	быстродействующее редукционное устройство со сбросом в конденсатор турбины	bystrodeystvuyushcheye reduktsionnoye ustroystvo so sbrosom v kondensator turbiny	steam relief valve for steam discharge to turbine condenser	
БРУ-ТК	быстродействующее редукционное устройство со сбросом в технологический конденсатор	bystrodeystvuyushcheye reduktsionnoye ustroystvo so sbrosom v tekhnologicheskiy kondensator	high-speed pressure reducing device with discharge into a process condenser	
БС	барабан-сепаратор	baraban-separator	drum separator	
БСМ	быстрое снижение мощности	bystroye snizheniye moshchnosti	rapid decrease in power	
БЩУ	блочный щит управления	blochnyy shchit upravleniya	block control panel	
БЩУ-Н	блочный щит управления неоперативный	blochnyy shchit upravleniya neoperativnyy	non-operational block control panel	
БЩУ-О	блочный щит управления оперативный	blochnyy shchit upravleniya operativnyy	operational block control panel	
ВЗД	внутризонный датчик	vnutrizonnyy datchik	intra-zone sensor	
ВИК	высотная ионизационная камера	vysotnaya ionizatsionnaya kamera	high-altitude ionization chamber	
ВК	верхний концевой выключатель	verkhniy kontsevoy vyklyuchatel'	upper limit switch	
ВРД-В	внутриреакторный датчик (контроля энерговыделения) высотный	vnutrireaktornyy datchik (kontrolya energovydeleniya) vysotnyy	in-reactor sensor (energy release monitoring) altitude	
ВРД-Р	внутриреакторный датчик (контроля энерговыделения) радиальный	vnutrireaktornyy datchik (kontrolya energovydeleniya) radial'nyy	in-reactor sensor (power release monitoring) radial	
ВСРО	вспомогательные системы реакторного отделения	vspomogatel'nyye sistemy reaktornogo otdeleniya	auxiliary systems of the reactor compartment	
ГПК	главный предохранительный клапан	glavnyy predokhranitel'nyy klapan	main relief valve	
ГЦК	главный циркуляционный контур	glavnyy tsirkulyatsionnyy kontur	main circulation circuit	
ГЦН	главный циркуляционный насос	glavnyy tsirkulyatsionnyy nasos	main circulation pump	MCP
ДКЭ	датчик контроля энерговыделения	datchik kontrolya energovydeleniya	energy release monitoring sensor	
ДП	дополнительный поглотитель	dopolnitel'nyy poglotitel'	additional absorber	
ДРЕГ	диагностическая регистрация параметров	diagnosticheskaya registratsiya parametrov	diagnostic recording of parameters	DREG
ДРК	дроссельно-регулирующий клапан	drossel'no-reguliruyushchiy klapan	throttle control valve	
ДЭ	деаэраторная этажерка	deaeratornaya etazherka	deaerator rack	
ЖРО	жидкие радиоактивные отходы	zhidkiye radioaktivnyye otkhody	liquid radioactive waste	
ЗРК	запорно-регулирующий клапан	zaporno-reguliruyushchiy klapan	shut-off and control valve	
ИПУ	импульсное предохранительное устройство	impul'snoye predokhranitel'noye ustroystvo	impulse safety device	
ИСС	информационно-измерительная система	informatsionno-izmeritel'naya sistema	information and measuring system	
КГО	контроль герметичности оболочки	kontrol' germetichnosti obolochki	shell tightness control	
КД	камера деления	kamera deleniya	fission chamber	
КИУМ	коэффициент использования установленной мощности	koeffitsiyent ispol'zovaniya ustanovlennoy moshchnosti	installed capacity utilization factor	
КМПЦ	контур многократной принудительной циркуляции	kontur mnogokratnoy prinuditel'noy tsirkulyatsii	multiple forced circulation circuit	
КОО	канал охлаждения отражателя	kanal okhlazhdeniya otrazhatelya	reflector cooling channel	
КПР	капитально-плановый ремонт	kapital'no-planovyy remont	major scheduled repairs	
КРО	кластерный регулирующий клапан	klasternyy reguliruyushchiy klapan	cluster control valve	
КУС	ключ управления стержнями	klyuch upravleniya sterzhnyami	rod control key	
КЦТК	контроль целостности технологических каналов	kontrol' tselostnosti tekhnologicheskikh kanalov	control of the integrity of process channels	
ЛАЗ	локальная аварийная защита	lokal'naya avariynaya zashchita	local emergency protection	
ЛАР	локальный автоматический регулятор	lokal'nyy avtomaticheskiy regulyator	local automatic regulator	
МЗР	максимальный запас реактивности	maksimal'nyy zapas reaktivnosti	maximum reactivity margin	
МПА	максимальная проектная авария	maksimal'naya proyektnaya avariya	maximum design basis accident	
МТК	мнемотабло технологических каналов	mnemotablo tekhnologicheskikh kanalov	mnemonic display of technological channels	
МФК	минимальный физический уровень мощности	minimal'nyy fizicheskiy uroven' moshchnosti	minimum physical power level	
НВК	нижние водяные коммуникации	nizhniye vodyanyye kommunikatsii	lower water communications	
НК	напорный коллектор	napornyy kollektor	pressure manifold	
НСБ	начальник смены блока	nachal'nik smeny bloka	shift supervisor	
НСС	начальник смены станции	nachal'nik smeny stantsii	station shift supervisor	
НФХ	нейтронно-физические характеристики	neytronno-fizicheskiye kharakteristiki	neutron-physical characteristics	
ОЗР	оперативный запас реактивности	operativnyy zapas reaktivnosti	operating reactivity margin	ORM
ОК	обратный клапан	obratnyy klapan	check valve	
ОПБ	Общие положения безопасности	obshchiye polozheniya bezopasnosti	general safety provisions	
ПВД	подогреватель высокого давления	podogrevatel' vysokogo davleniya	high pressure heater	
ПВК	пароводяные коммуникации	parovodyanyye kommunikatsii	steam and water communications	
ПК-АЗ	режим действия группы стержней перекомпенсации	rezhim deystviya gruppy sterzhney perekompensatsii	operating mode of the overcompensation rod group	
ПКД	паровой компенсатор давления	parovoy kompensator davleniya	steam pressure compensator	
ПН	питательный насос	pitatel'nyy nasos	feedwater pump	
ППБ	плотно-прочный бокс	plotno-prochnyy boks	tightly-durable box	
ППР	планово-предупредительный ремонт	planovo-predupreditel'nyy remont	scheduled preventive maintenance	
ПРИЗМА	программа измерения мощности аппарата	programma izmereniya moshchnosti apparata	program for measuring the device's power	PRIZMA, PRISMA
ПСУ	пассивное спринклерное устройство	passivnoye sprinklernoye ustroystvo	passive sprinkler device	
ПЭН	питательный электронасос	pitatel'nyy elektronasos	feed electric pump	
ПЯБ	Правила ядерной безопасности	pravila yadernoy bezopasnosti	Nuclear safety regulations	
РВ	резервное возбуждение турбины	rezervnoye vozbuzhdeniye turbiny	turbine backup excitation	
РГК	раздаточно-групповой коллектор	razdatochno-gruppovoy kollektor	distribution and group collector	
РЗМ	разгрузочно-загрузочная машина	razgruzochno-zagruzochnaya mashina	loading and unloading machine	
РЗК	разгрузочно-загрузочный комплекс	razgruzochno-zagruzochnyy kompleks	loading and unloading complex	
РК СУЗ	рабочий канал системы управления и защиты	rabochiy kanal sistemy upravleniya i zashchity	working channel of the control and protection system	
РП	реакторное пространство	reaktornoye prostranstvo	reactor space	
РР	ручное регулирование	ruchnoye regulirovaniye	manual control	
РУ	реакторная установка	reaktornaya ustanovka	reactor installation	
САОР	система аварийного охлаждения реактора	sistema avariynogo okhlazhdeniya reaktora	emergency reactor cooling system	
СБ	системы безопасности	sistemy bezopasnosti	security systems	
СВП	стержень выгорающего поглотителя	sterzhen' vygorayushchego poglotitelya	burnable absorber rod	
СГО	система герметичного ограждения	sistema germetichnogo ograzhdeniya	hermetic enclosure system	
СЛА	система локализации аварий	sistema lokalizatsii avariy	accident localization system	ALS
Скала	система контроля аппарата Ленинградской атомная электростанция	sistema kontrolya apparata Leningradskoy atomnaya elektrostantsiya	Leningrad NPP apparatus control system	SKALA, SCALA
СП	стержень-поглотитель	sterzhen'-poglotitel'	absorber rod	
СПИР	система пассивного отвода тепла	sistema passivnogo otvoda tepla	passive heat dissipation system	
СРК	стопорно-регулирующий клапан	stoporno-reguliruyushchiy klapan	shut-off and control valve	
СТК	система технологического контроля	sistema tekhnologicheskogo kontrolya	process control system	
СУЗ	система управления и защиты	sistema upravleniya i zashchity	control and protection system	SUZ
СФКРЭ	система физического контроля распределения энерговыделения	sistema fizicheskogo kontrolya raspredeleniya energovydeleniya	physical control system for energy distribution	
СЦК	система централизованного контроля	sistema tsentralizovannogo kontrolya	centralized control system	refers to SKALA
ТВС	тепловыделяющая сборка	teplovydelyayushchaya sborka	fuel assembly	
ТВЭЛ	тепловыделяющий элемент	teplovydelyayushchiy element	fuel element, nuclear fuel	TVEL
ТГ	турбогенератор	turbogenerator	turbo generator	
ТК	технологический канал	tekhnologicheskiy kanal	technological channel	
ТН	теплоноситель	teplonositel'	coolant	
УЗСП	усилитель защиты по скорости пускового диапазона	usilitel' zashchity po skorosti puskovogo diapazona	starting range speed protection amplifier	
УСП	укороченный стержень-поглотитель (ручной)	ukorochennyy sterzhen'-poglotitel' (ruchnoy)	shortened absorber rod (manual)	USP
УТЦ	учебно-тренировочный центр	uchebno-trenirovochnyy tsentr	training center	
ЯТ	ядерное топливо	yadernoye toplivo	nuclear fuel	
ЯТЦ	ядерный топливный цикл	yadernyy toplivnyy tsikl	nuclear fuel cycle	
ЯЭУ	ядерная энергетическая установка	yadernaya energeticheskaya ustanovka	nuclear power plant	

== Issues of RBMK ==
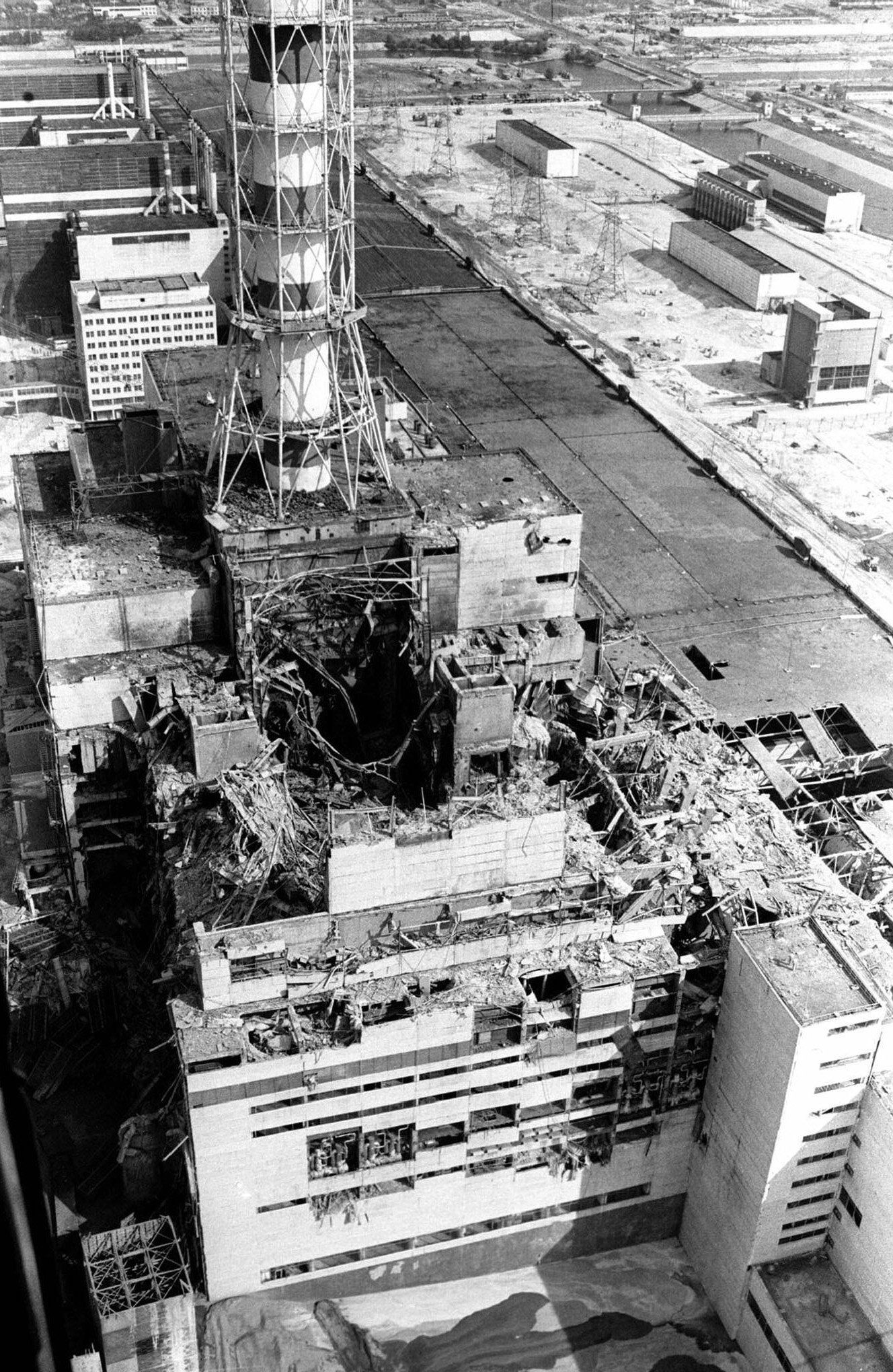
The 4th RBMK reactor of the Chernobyl Nuclear Power Plant, destroyed in the 1986 Chernobyl disaster

=== Design flaws and safety issues ===
As an early Generation II reactor based on 1950s Soviet technology, the RBMK design was optimized for speed of production but sacrificed redundancy. Several of its design characteristics would prove to be dangerously unstable when operated outside their design specifications. The decision to use a graphite core with natural uranium fuel allowed for massive power generation at only a quarter of the expense of heavy water reactors, which were more maintenance-intensive and required large volumes of expensive heavy water for startup. However, its unintended consequences would not reveal themselves fully until the Chernobyl disaster in 1986.

=== High positive void coefficient ===
Light water (ordinary H_{2}O) is both a neutron moderator and a neutron absorber. This means that not only can it slow down neutrons to velocities in equilibrium with surrounding molecules ("thermalize" them and turn them into low-energy neutrons, known as thermal neutrons, that are far more likely to interact with the uranium-235 nuclei than the fast neutrons produced by fission initially), but it also absorbs some of them.

In the RBMK series of reactors, light water functions as a coolant, while moderation is mainly carried out by graphite. As graphite already moderates neutrons, light water has a lesser effect in slowing them down, but could still absorb them. This means that the reactor's reactivity (adjustable by appropriate neutron-absorbing rods) must take into account the neutrons absorbed by light water.

In the case of vaporisation of water to steam, the place occupied by water would be occupied by water vapor, which has a density vastly lower than that of liquid water (the exact number depends on pressure and temperature; at standard conditions, steam is about 1/1350 as dense as liquid water). Because of this lower density (of mass, and consequently of atom nuclei able to absorb neutrons), light water's neutron-absorption capability practically disappears when it boils. This allows more neutrons to fission more U-235 nuclei and thereby increase the reactor power, which leads to higher temperatures that boil even more water, creating a thermal feedback loop.

In RBMK reactors, generation of steam in the coolant water would then in practice create a void: a bubble that does not absorb neutrons. The reduction in moderation by light water is irrelevant, as graphite still moderates the neutrons. However, the loss of absorption dramatically alters the balance of neutron production, causing a runaway condition in which more and more neutrons are produced, and their density grows exponentially. Such a condition is called a "positive void coefficient", and the RBMK reactor series has the highest positive void coefficient of any commercial reactor ever designed.

A high void coefficient does not necessarily make a reactor inherently unsafe, as some of the fission neutrons are emitted with a delay of seconds or even minutes (post-fission neutron emission from daughter nuclei), and therefore steps can be taken to reduce the fission rate before it becomes too high. This situation, however, does make it considerably harder to control the reactor, especially at low power. Thus, control systems must be very reliable and control-room personnel must be rigorously trained in the peculiarities and limits of the system. Neither of these requirements was in place at Chernobyl: since the reactor's actual design bore the approval stamp of the Kurchatov Institute and was considered a state secret, discussion of the reactor's flaws was forbidden, even among the actual personnel operating the plant. Some later RBMK designs did include control rods on electromagnetic grapples, thus controlling the reaction speed and, if necessary, stopping the reaction completely. The RBMK reactor at Chernobyl, however, had manual clutch control rods.

All RBMK reactors underwent significant changes following the Chernobyl disaster. The positive void coefficient was reduced from +4.5 β to +0.7 β, decreasing the likelihood of further reactivity accidents, at the cost of higher enrichment requirements of the uranium fuel.

=== Improvements since the Chernobyl accident ===
In his posthumously published memoirs, Valery Legasov, the First Deputy Director of the Kurchatov Institute of Atomic Energy, revealed that the institute's scientists had long known that the RBMK had significant design flaws. Legasov's suicide in 1988, following frustrated attempts to promote nuclear and industrial safety reform, caused shockwaves throughout the scientific community. The RBMK's design problems were discussed increasingly openly.

Following the accident at Chernobyl, all remaining RBMK reactors were retrofitted with a number of updates for safety. The largest of these updates fixed the RBMK control rod design. The control rods have 4.5-metre (14 ft 9 in) graphite displacers, which prevent coolant water from entering the space vacated as the rods are withdrawn. In the original design, those displacers, being shorter than the height of the core, left 1.25-metre (4.1 ft) columns of water at the bottom (and 1.25 metres [4.1 ft] at the top) when the rods were fully extracted.

During insertion, the graphite would first displace that lower water, locally increasing reactivity. Also, when the rods were in their uppermost position, the absorber ends were outside the core, requiring a relatively large displacement before achieving a significant reduction in reactivity. These design flaws were likely the final trigger of the first explosion of the Chernobyl accident, causing the lower part of the core to become prompt critical when the operators tried to shut down the highly destabilized reactor by reinserting the rods. The updates are:

- An increase in fuel enrichment from 2% to 2.4% to compensate for control rod modifications and the introduction of additional absorbers.
- Manual control rod count increased from 30 to 45.
- 80 additional absorbers inhibit operation at low power, where the RBMK design is most dangerous.
- AZ-5 (emergency reactor shutdown or Scram) sequence reduced from 18 to 12 seconds.
- Addition of the БАЗ or BAZ system, (rapid reactor emergency protection) which would insert 24 uniformly distributed rods into the reactor core via a modified drive mechanism within 1.8 to 2.5 seconds.
- Precautions against unauthorized access to emergency safety systems.

In addition, RELAP5-3D models of RBMK-1500 reactors were developed for use in integrated thermal-hydraulics-neutronics calculations for the analysis of specific transients in which the neutronic response of the core is important.

BAZ button is intended as a preemptive measure to bring down reactivity before AZ-5 is activated, to enable the safe and stable emergency shutdown of a RBMK.

=== Deformed graphite moderator blocks ===
From May 2012 to December 2013, Leningrad-1 was offline while repairs were made related to deformed graphite moderator blocks. The 18-month project included research and the development of maintenance machines and monitoring systems. Similar work will be applied to the remaining operational RBMKs. Graphite moderator blocks in the RBMK can be repaired and replaced in situ, unlike in the other current large graphite moderated reactor, the advanced gas-cooled reactor.

Longitudinal cutting in some of the graphite columns during lifetime extension refurbishment work can return the graphite stack to its initial design geometry.

=== Modernization and decommissioning RBMK ===
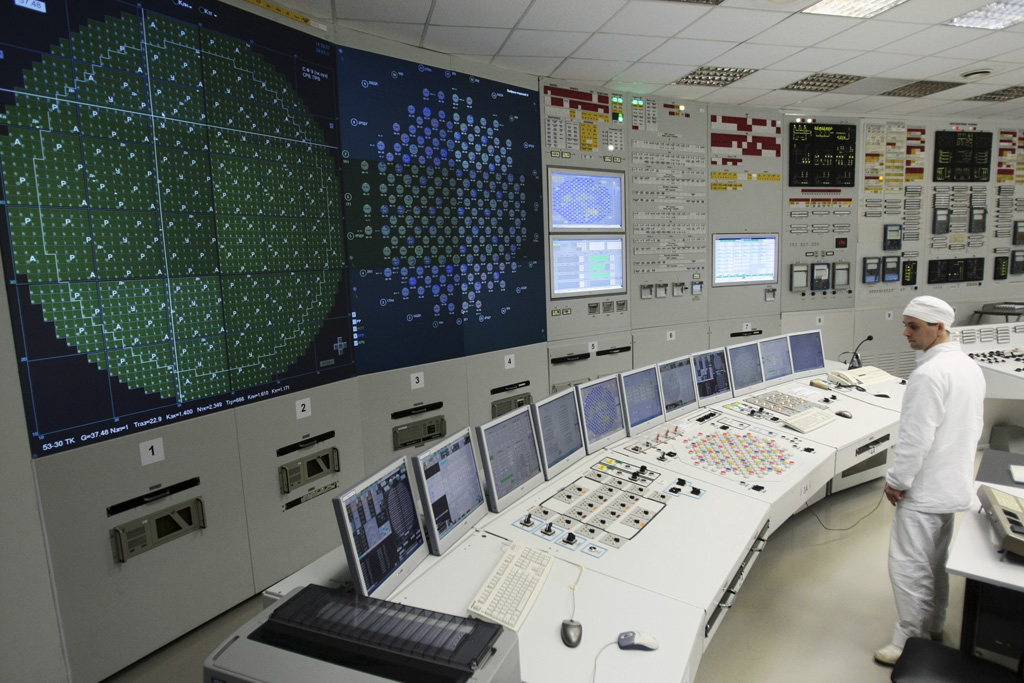
A modernized control center of RBMK reactor in Leningrad NPP

Due to growing demand of energy in Russia, RBMK reactors has been undergoing service life extension by modernisation. Originally, RBMK designed for 25 years of service life. The modernization includes rectification of problem related to the Chernobyl accident, ratification of current safety standards, and ultimately extension of service life. Because of said modernization, RBMKs achieve improvement on safety, reliability and economic efficiency.

Despite such feasibility for extensive modifications and upgrade, Soviet-designed reactors were closed.

== Further development ==
A post-Soviet redesign of the RBMK is the MKER (Russian: МКЭР, Многопетлевой Канальный Энергетический Реактор [Mnogopetlevoy Kanalniy Energeticheskiy Reaktor], which means Multi-loop pressure tube power reactor), with improved safety and a containment building. A MKER-800, MKER-1000 and MKER-1500 were planned for the Leningrad nuclear power plant.

== List of RBMK reactors ==
Color key:

– Operational reactor (including reactors currently offline)	– Reactor decommissioned	– Reactor destroyed in accident	– Abandoned or cancelled reactor construction

Location	Current Country	Reactor type	Online	Status	Net Capacity (MW_{e})	Gross Capacity (MW_{e})
Chernobyl-1	Ukraine	RBMK-1000	1977	shut down in 1996	740	800^{[A]}
Chernobyl-2	Ukraine	RBMK-1000	1978	shut down in 1991 due to turbine fire	925	1,000
Chernobyl-3	Ukraine	RBMK-1000	1981	shut down in 2000	925	1,000
Chernobyl-4	Ukraine	RBMK-1000	1983	destroyed in 1986	925	1,000
Chernobyl-5	Ukraine	RBMK-1000	N/A	construction cancelled in 1988	925	1,000
Chernobyl-6	Ukraine	RBMK-1000	N/A	construction cancelled in 1988	925	1,000
Ignalina-1	Lithuania	RBMK-1500	1983	shut down in 2004	1,185	1,300^{[B]}
Ignalina-2	Lithuania	RBMK-1500	1987	shut down in 2009	1,185	1,300^{[B]}
Ignalina-3	Lithuania	RBMK-1500	N/A	construction cancelled in 1988	1,380	1,500
Ignalina-4	Lithuania	RBMK-1500	N/A	plan cancelled in 1988	1,380	1,500
Kostroma-1	Russia	RBMKP-2400	N/A	construction cancelled in 1980s	2,260	2,400
Kostroma-2	Russia	RBMKP-2400	N/A	construction cancelled in 1980s	2,260	2,400
Kursk-1	Russia	RBMK-1000	1977	shut down in 2021	925	1,000
Kursk-2	Russia	RBMK-1000	1979	shut down in 2024	925	1,000
Kursk-3	Russia	RBMK-1000	1984	operational until 2033	925	1,000
Kursk-4	Russia	RBMK-1000	1985	operational until 2035	925	1,000
Kursk-5	Russia	RBMK-1000^{[B]}	N/A	construction cancelled in 2012	925	1,000
Kursk-6	Russia	RBMK-1000	N/A	construction cancelled in 1993	925	1,000
Leningrad-1	Russia	RBMK-1000	1974	shut down in 2018	925	1,000
Leningrad-2	Russia	RBMK-1000	1976	shut down in 2020	925	1,000
Leningrad-3	Russia	RBMK-1000	1979	operational until 2030 (extended by 5 years in 2025)	925	1,000
Leningrad-4	Russia	RBMK-1000	1981	operational until 2031 (extended by 5 years in 2026)	925	1,000
Smolensk-1	Russia	RBMK-1000	1983	operational until 2028	925	1,000
Smolensk-2	Russia	RBMK-1000	1985	operational until 2030	925	1,000
Smolensk-3	Russia	RBMK-1000	1990	operational until 2034	925	1,000
Smolensk-4	Russia	RBMK-1000	N/A	construction cancelled in 1993	925	1,000

^{A} Built with 1,000 MW_{e} gross electric power, Reactor 1 was derated to 800MWe following the 1982 partial meltdown incident.
^{B} Built with 1,500 MW_{e} gross electric power, the RBMK-1500 were de-rated to 1,360 MW after the Chernobyl disaster.

== Known incidents ==
Many incidents occurred at various power plants operating the RBMK reactor. Most of them were covered up. Incidents such as thefts of materials, equipment malfunction, repeated shut down due to them, etc. occurred. The most serious incidents such as the Partial meltdown of Leningrad unit 1 and Chernobyl unit 1 were not taken seriously and the recommendations of the scientist and experts were not implemented, which paved the path to the 1986 disaster. These are some of the known incidents at the RBMK reactors:

- Explosion of a tank holding radioactive gases at the Leningrad Nuclear Power Plant unit 1 in January 1975
- Partial meltdown at Leningrad unit 1 in 1975
- Power outage at the Kursk Nuclear Power Plant in 1980
- Partial meltdown at Chernobyl unit 1 in 1982
- Discovery of the positive scram effect at Ignalina Nuclear Power Plant unit 1 in 1983 and at unit 4 of the Chernobyl Nuclear Power Plant
- Shifting of the concrete cross bars at Chernobyl Nuclear Power Plant units 3 and 4 in 1984
- Chernobyl disaster in 1986
- Turbine fire at Chernobyl unit 2 in 1991 resulting in its permanent shutdown
- Melting of cables at Chernobyl unit 1 in 1991 while testing of the ion chambers during a maintenance shutdown and the automatic control rods didn't respond during the AZ-MM signal, the low power protection system fails
- Radioactive water was released when a seal plug of one of the Main Circulation Pump of Chernobyl unit 1 failed
- Chernobyl unit 3 scrammed following high level of water in the steam separator drums in March 1993
- Chernobyl unit 3 scrammed in 1994 following a short circuit resulting in pumping of the Emergency core cooling system (ECCS) water into the steam separator drums
- Chernobyl unit 3 scrammed following detection of a steam leak in one of the fuel channel due to defective welding during assembly in 1981
- Chernobyl unit 1 scrammed after the refueling machine got stuck in one of the channels in 1995
- On 27 August 2009, the third unit of the Leningrad Nuclear Power plant was stopped when a hole was found in the discharge header of a pump. According to the automated radiation control system, the radiation situation at the plant and in its 30-kilometre (19 mi) monitoring zone was normal. The plant's management refuted rumors of an accident and stated that the third unit was stopped for a "short-term unscheduled maintenance", with a restart scheduled for 31 August 2009.

== Sources and external links ==
- Technical data on RBMK-1500 reactor at Ignalina nuclear power plant – a decommissioned RBMK reactor.
- Chernobyl – A Canadian Perspective – A brochure describing nuclear reactors in general and the RBMK design in particular, focusing on the safety differences between them and CANDU reactors. Published by Atomic Energy of Canada Limited.
