= Smolensk Nuclear Power Plant =

Nuclear power plant in Smolensk Oblast, Russia

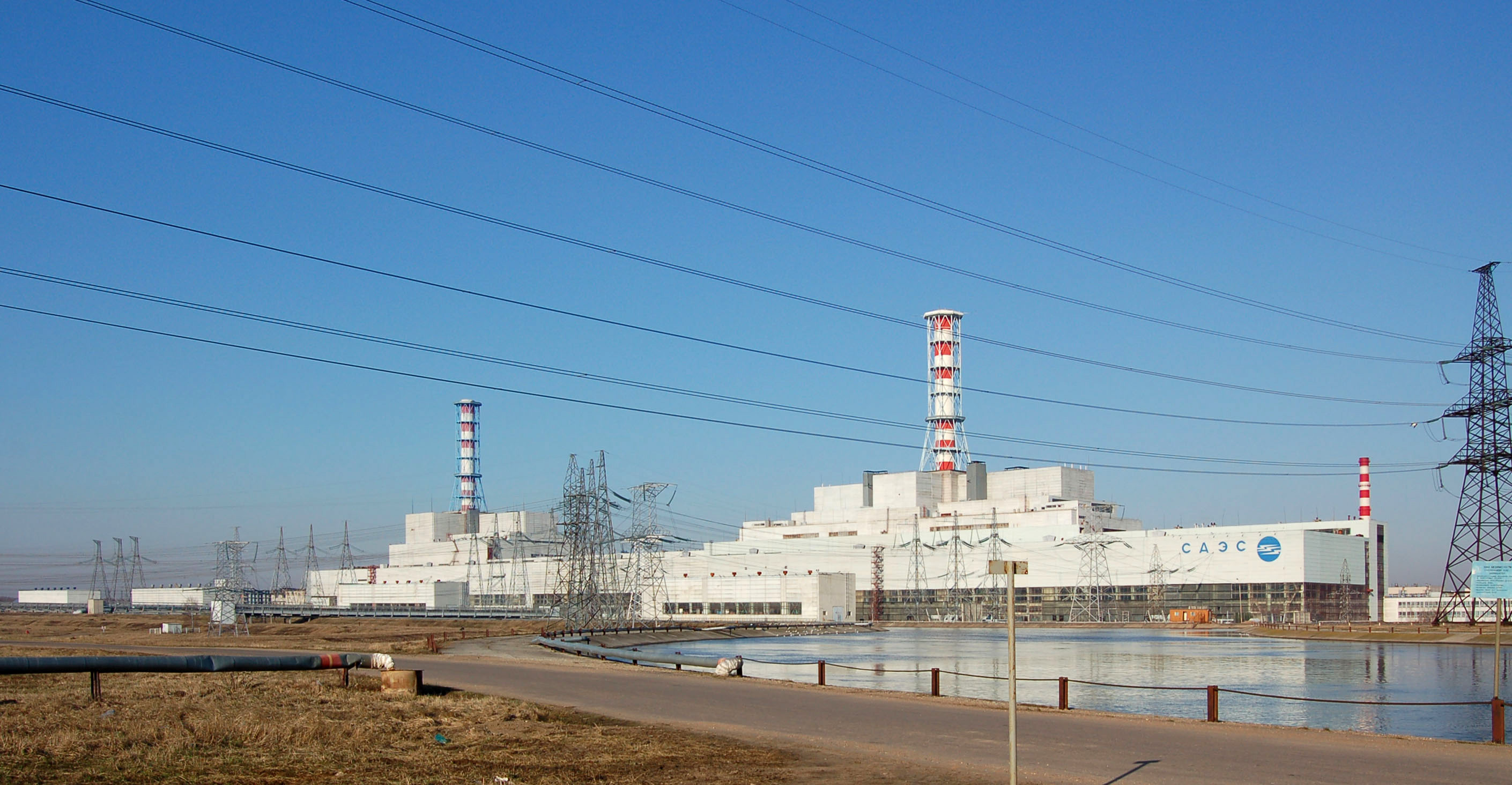
- Country: Russia
- Coordinates: 54°09′58″N 33°14′21″E
- Status: Operational
- Construction began: 1 October 1975
- Commission date: 9 December 1982
- Owner: Rosenergoatom
- Operator: Rosenergoatom

Nuclear power station
- Reactor type: RBMK

Power generation
- Units operational: 3 x 1,000 MW
- Units cancelled: 1 x 1,000 MW
- Nameplate capacity: 3,000 MW
- Capacity factor: ~75% (total, cumulative up to 2018)

External links
- Website: www.rosenergoatom.ru/en/npp/smolensk-npp/
- Commons: Related media on Commons

Smolensk Nuclear Power Plant (Russian: Смоленская АЭС []) is a nuclear power station in Russia. It is located in Smolensk Oblast, in the town of Desnogorsk, approximately 100 kilometres (62 mi) from Smolensk, 115 kilometres (71 mi) from Bryansk and 320 kilometres (200 mi) from Moscow. Smolensk Nuclear Power Plant is the biggest power generating station in the north-western region of the united energy system of Russia. Smolensk NPP has an outer appearance similar to that of Chernobyl NPP units 3-4, as both are later generation RBMKs.

== Construction and operation ==
Construction began on the Smolensk NPP in the late 1970s. The NPP was originally intended to be constructed in two phases with units 1 and 2 starting in 1975 and 1976, followed by units 3 and 4 in the mid-late 1980s. Unit 3 began construction in early 1984. However, the construction of the fourth reactor was interrupted by the Chernobyl disaster of April 1986 and plans were cancelled in 1993. The three RBMK-1000 reactors of Smolensk NPP were commissioned in 1982-1990 (First Criticality for each unit Unit 1: 10 September 1982; Unit 2: 9 April 1985; Unit 3: 29 December 1989, with grid connection shortly thereafter).

The reactors of Smolensk NPP are the improved versions of RBMK with a number of innovative safety systems. In the past years Smolensk NPP has generated as much as 283BkWh and has proved its high efficiency and safety. The plant has been repeatedly proclaimed the best NPP in Russia and awarded by "Rosenergoatom" with the award of "Concern for excellent performance and safety". According to authorities, the plant has no negative effect on the nearby environment – in the past years the radiation background in the area has not changed and is stably within norm. Collectively, the three units of the Smolensk NPP have produced electricity equivalent to that of 90,000,000 tons of coal and have prevented the emission of 6,000,000 tons of airborne contaminants - albeit with the inevitable production of tons of nuclear waste.

== Safety systems and environmental impact ==
All the units are equipped with emergency response systems, which can prevent release of radioactive material into the environment even in case of serious accident; for example breakage of pipes in the reactor cooling circuit. The reactor cooling circuit is housed in hermetic reinforced concrete boxes that can withstand a pressure of 440 kilopascals (4.5 kgf/cm^{2}). Also part of the emergency response system are special steam condensers which have a 3000 m^3 capacity. Smolensk NPP has special systems that will be able to remove heat from the reactor even in case of the plant’s complete loss of electrical power. The environment radiation control sub-system conducts round-the-clock monitoring of a 30-km zone around the station, with the help of sensors installed all over the area which can detect abnormal radioactivity levels in water, soil, plants and agricultural produce consumed by the local population. The findings of independent experts from the State Sanitary Inspection (liquidated in the beginning of the 1950s) and the State Hydro-meteorological Committee say that the radiation background at Smolensk NPP and in the nearby area is consistent with background radiation. Hence, Smolensk NPP is an ecologically friendly facility having no significant radiological or chemical effect on the population and the environment. The key goal set by the Smolensk NPP is to reduce the risk of incidents that may have negative effect on the personnel and the environment. All the measures provided for by the safety enhancement concept of "Rosenergoatom". Concerns are aimed at reducing the risk of incidents at the REA NPPs. The safety declaration of Smolensk NPP says that the plant seeks to become the safest NPP in Russia.

== Units ==
Unit	Reactor type	Net capacity	Gross capacity	Construction started	Electricity Grid	Commercial Operation	Shutdown
Smolensk – 1	RBMK-1000	925 MW	1,000 MW	1975-10-01	1982-12-09	1983-09-30	2028 planned
Smolensk – 2	RBMK-1000	925 MW	1,000 MW	1976-06-01	1985-05-31	1985-07-02	2030 planned
Smolensk – 3	RBMK-1000	925 MW	1,000 MW	1984-05-01	1990-01-17	1990-10-12	2034 planned
Smolensk – 4	RBMK-1000	925 MW	1,000 MW	1984-10-01	–	–	Construction cancelled on 1 December 1993
Smolensk – II-1	VVER-1200	1085 MW	1199 MW	2027 (est.)	2033 (est.)		
Smolensk – II-2	VVER-1200	1085 MW	1199 MW		2035 (est.)		

== Smolensk II Nuclear Power Station ==
As the older RBMK units begin to be removed from service due to age, they are being replaced by modern VVER type reactors. The three sites (Kursk I, Leningrad I, Smolensk I) which all consist of 3+ RBMK reactors are going to be replaced with VVER-1200 units at Leningrad and VVER-TOI units at Smolensk (2 units are already in pre-construction phase with planned completion in 2033 - each rated at 1250 MW per unit - out of a total of 4 units announced) and Kursk. The three RBMK reactors are expected to remain in operation until the new reactors are commissioned.

== See also ==
- Nuclear power in Russia
- RBMK
