= Kostroma Nuclear Power Plant =

Proposed Russian nuclear power plant

Kostroma NPP
- Generation: Generation III+ reactor
- Reactor concept: Pressurized water reactor
- Reactor line: VVER (Voda Voda Energo Reactor)
- Reactor types: 4 VVER-1200 reactors
- Coordinates: 58°22′00″N 41°36′00″E

Main parameters of the reactor core
- Fuel (fissile material): ^{235}U (NU/SEU/LEU)
- Fuel state: Solid
- Neutron energy spectrum: Thermal
- Primary control method: Control rods
- Primary moderator: Water
- Primary coolant: Liquid (light water)

Reactor usage
- Primary use: Generation of electricity
- Power (electric): 4800MW

Kostroma Nuclear Power Plant is a proposed, but as-yet non-existent nuclear power plant that was to be erected in the Buysky District, of Kostroma Oblast in Russia.

== History ==
In the mid-1970s within the erstwhile Soviet Union, it was decided by the Soviet Council of Ministers under chairman Alexei Kosygin that a nuclear power plant would be constructed in Kostroma, using two RBMKP-2400 generation II reactor cores.

Construction began in 1979, with several design changes made throughout; in the 1980s, Soviet planners decided to build two RBMK-1500 reactors instead. In the aftermath of the 1986 Chernobyl disaster, the plant's design was again re-drawn to use VVER-1000 reactors. All construction came to a complete stop in 1990, not long before the collapse of the Soviet Union. In the '90s, a proposal was made to build two VPBER-600 reactors (variants of the VVER-640 design), but the proposal never reached production stage.

On 8 December 1996, further construction was rejected by referendum with 87% voting against. By 1999, the Kostroma Regional Court and later Supreme Court of the Russian Federation ruled the Kostroma Oblast Duma decision to hold a referendum (date 25 April 1996, No. 278) illegal.

Per resolution No. 1574 of the Kostroma Oblast Duma, date 1 March 2007, all resolutions preventing construction were cancelled and, therefore, construction was to resume in earnest; on-site switchgear had already been installed that could handle up to 500kV.

== Resumed construction efforts (2008) ==
On 14 October 2008, Kostroma's regional governor was presented with a Declaration of Intent to invest in the construction of two power units, signed by Rosatom State Corporation's then General Director, Sergey Kiriyenko. Public hearings held in 2009 discussed the potential environmental impact for power units No. 1 and 2 of the plant. Construction of the plant was also referenced by a government scheme to improve energy infrastructure within Russia, approved for construction until the year 2030 by order of the Russian government.

It was decided that the plant would be built in stages: between 2016 and 2020, two power units would be built using the VVER-1200 design with a capacity of 2300MW. Later, two additional units would have been installed for a total capacity of 4600MW.

== Construction canceled again (2011) ==
By April 2011, Rosatom had received a license from Russian energy regulator Rostekhnadzor, authorising construction. In the end, Rosatom canceled all construction plans.

To this day, the Kostroma Nuclear Power Plant has never been built.
