= EGP-6 =

Russian small nuclear reactor design

The EGP-6 (Russian: Энергетический Гетерогенный Петлевой реактор с 6 петлями циркуляции теплоносителя, romanized: Energeticheskiy Geterogennyy Petlevoy reaktor s 6 petlyami tsirkulyatsii teplonositelya, lit. 'Power heterogeneous loop reactor with 6 coolant circulation loops') is a Russian small nuclear reactor design. It is a scaled down version of the RBMK design. As the RBMK, the EGP-6 uses water for cooling and graphite as a neutron moderator, but uses natural circulation instead of pumping. EGP is a Russian acronym but translated into English it stands for Power Heterogenous Loop reactor. It is the world's smallest running commercial nuclear reactor, however smaller reactors are currently in development. The EGP-6 reactors are the only reactors to be built on permafrost.

There were only four EGP-6 reactors built which formed the Bilibino Nuclear Power Plant, commissioned in 1974–1977, with a reactor becoming operational each year. The reactors were responsible for supplying Bilibino with utilities such as electricity, heated water, and steam. The population of Bilibino currently sits at around 5,000 and a large majority of its citizens are associated with the plant. The plant design was developed by the Ural Division of Teploelektroproekt together with Izhorskiye Zavody and FEI in Obninsk. Each EGP-6 reactor at Bilibino produces 62 MW thermal power, generating 12 MW electrical power (11 MW net capacity). As of 2020, the power plant is ready for decommissioning and awaits to be replaced by the Akademik Lomonosov floating nuclear power plant, which started regular operation in May 2020. The reason for decommissioning the reactors being that Akademik Lomonosov can supply Bilibino's power grid despite being located approximately 200 kilometres (120 mi) away from the town. The first EGP-6 reactor was shut down in December 2018, and the other 3 EGP-6 reactors were scheduled to follow December 2021, however a decision was made in 2020 to renew the license of one of the three reactors until December 2025.

== Sosny spent fuel decommissioning ==
Spent fuel of the EGP-6 reactors was troublesome, as the remote location of the Bilibino Nuclear Power Plant was difficult to get to with the small amount of transport infrastructure available. The Sosny R&D Company gained access to the spent fuel produced by the reactors in 2010 and began reviewing optimal strategies for containing the nuclear waste product. Spent fuel was often kept in reactor cooling pods or dry storage pools once they were depleted of useful energy, such as at the Bilibino Nuclear Power Plant, the only location where EGP-6 reactors were commissioned. The Sosny company performed diligent research on how to economically and safely move the spent fuel from the reactor site to a decommissioning location. The optimal solution developed involved remote robotic arms which were used to delicately cut up the spent fuel and encapsulate the pieces into transport casks. New transport infrastructure was designed specifically to remove the fuel from the reactor's remote location to Russia's mainland.

== See also ==
- List of nuclear reactors
- List of small modular reactor designs
- Nuclear power in Russia
