= Novovoronezh Nuclear Power Plant II =

Nuclear power plant in Voronezh Oblast, Russia

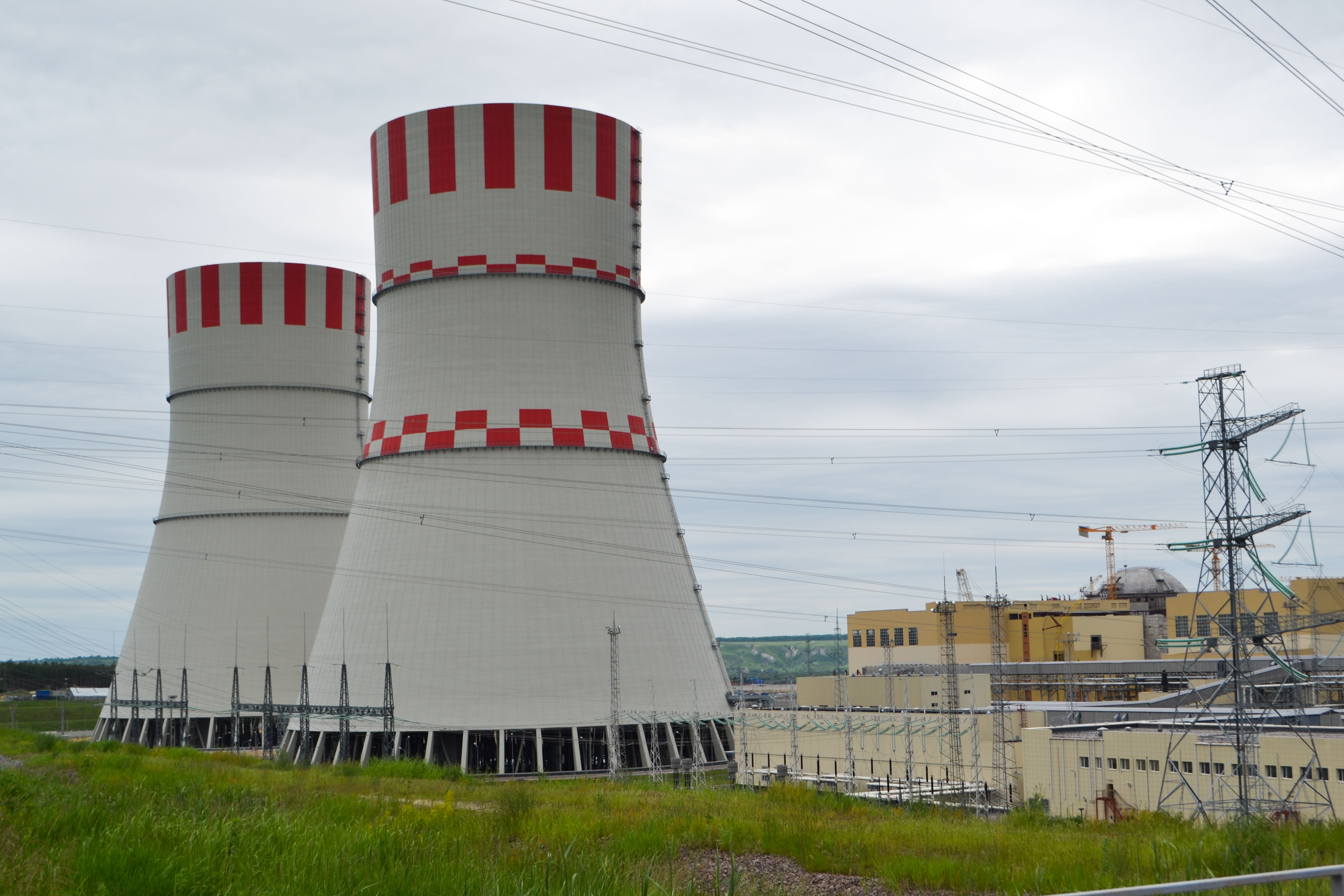
- The plant's cooling towers as of mid 2016
- Official name: Нововоронежская АЭС II
- Country: Russia
- Location: Voronezh Oblast
- Coordinates: 51°15′53.964″N 39°12′41.22″E
- Status: Operational
- Construction began: Unit 1: 24 June 2008; Unit 2: 12 July 2009
- Commission date: Unit 1: 27 February 2017; Unit 2: 1 November 2019
- Construction cost: ₽ 250 billion (2009) – between US$ 6.8 billion and US$ 8.7 billion at 2009 exchange rates
- Owner: Rosenergoatom
- Operator: Rosenergoatom

Nuclear power station
- Reactor type: VVER
- Reactor supplier: Atomstroyexport
- Cooling towers: 2 × Natural Draft
- Cooling source: Don River

Power generation
- Units operational: 1 × 1180 MW; 1 × 1150 MW
- Make and model: VVER-1200/392M (AES-2006)
- Nameplate capacity: 2330 MW

External links
- Website: Official website
- Commons: Related media on Commons

Novovoronezh Nuclear Power Plant II (NvNPPII; Russian: Нововоронежская АЭС II []) is a Russian nuclear power plant with two 1200 MW pressurized water reactors (VVER) located in Voronezh Oblast. The power plant is built on the same site as the present Novovoronezh Nuclear Power Plant.

Unit 1 started commercial operation in 2017, and was the first Generation III+ nuclear reactor in the world. Unit 2 was connected to the grid in 2019.

== History ==
In 2006, the Russian government legislated a nuclear expansion plan for 2007–2015. The plan aimed to put two new nuclear reactors into operation each year from 2012. This decision provided impetus for the construction of Novovoronezh II, which had been originally proposed in 1999.

On 20 June 2007 preparations began at the construction site, and the construction starting ceremony was held on 12 July 2009.

In January 2017 the plant took delivery of a safety instrumentation and control system from Areva NP for installation in its Unit 1.

The first criticality of the Unit 2 reactor was achieved on 22 March 2019, with connection to the grid on 1 May 2019.

== Description ==
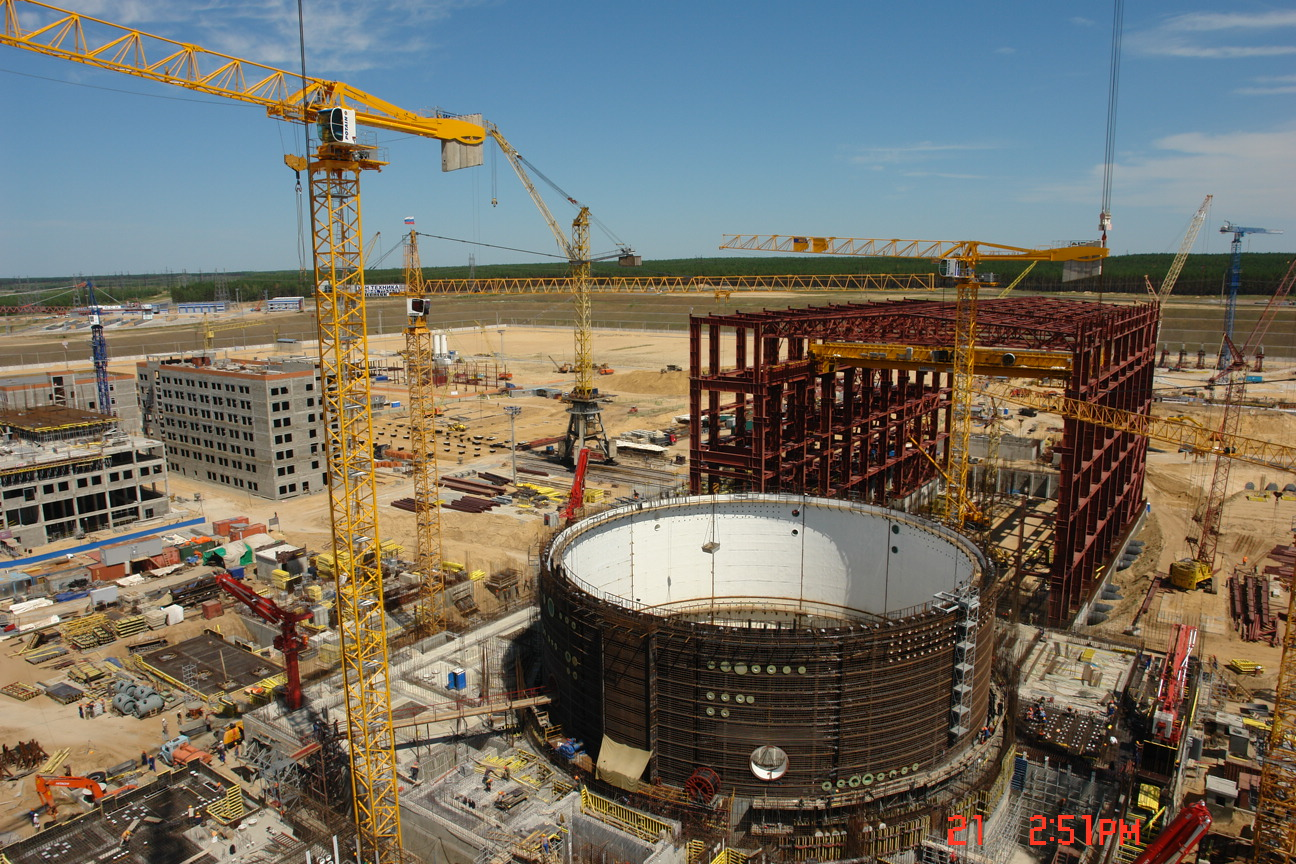
Unit 1 in Summer 2010

The power station will comprise two to four VVER-1200/392M reactors of the AES-2006 type. These reactors are the first of their kind. Unit 1 was planned to be added to the grid in 2012, with the second unit to be added a year later. Cost of the project is 250 billion Rubles. The city of Novovoronezh is to provide housing for incoming NvNPP II construction workers. In early 2008 the first two apartment blocks were complete and ready for use.

Construction of the nuclear power plant is important because the existing Novovoronezh nuclear power plant is a focal point of the energy supply system. The power plant complex provides energy not only to Voronezh Oblast but to Belgorod, Lipetsk and Tambov territories as well.

== Reactors ==
The Novovoronezh Nuclear Power Plant II has two units:

Unit	Reactor type	Net capacity	Gross capacity	Construction started	Electricity Grid	Commercial Operation	Expected shutdown
Novovoronezh II-1	VVER-1200/392M (AES-2006) prototype	1,114 MW	1,180 MW	24 June 2008	5 August 2016	27 February 2017	2077
Novovoronezh II-2	VVER-1200/392M (AES-2006)	1,114 MW	1,150 MW	12 July 2009	1 May 2019	1 November 2019	2079

Service life of the VVER-1200 is 60 years. With extension of operation for 20 years.

== See also ==
- Nuclear power in Russia
- List of commercial nuclear reactors § Russia
