= Kola Nuclear Power Plant =

Plant in Polyarnye Zori, Russia on the Kola Peninsula

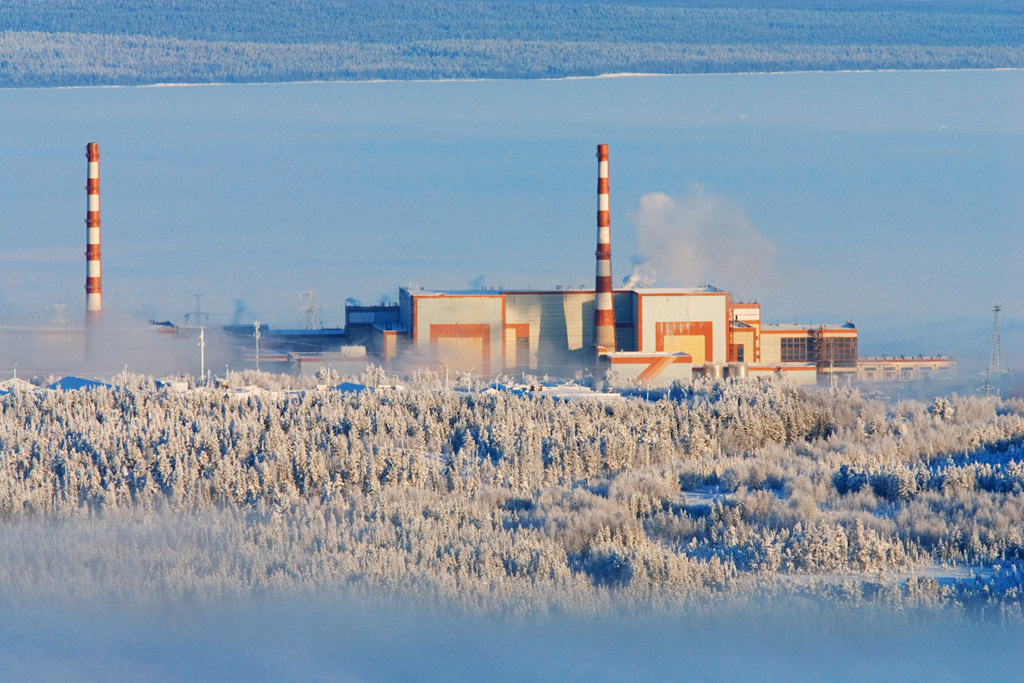
- Kola Nuclear Power Plant
- Country: Russia
- Location: near Polyarnye Zori, Murmansk Oblast
- Coordinates: 67°28′N 32°28′E
- Status: Operational
- Construction began: 1970
- Commission date: 28 December 1973
- Operator: Energoatom

Nuclear power station
- Reactor type: VVER

Power generation
- Units operational: 4 × 440 MW
- Nameplate capacity: 1,760 MW
- Capacity factor: 63.9%
- Annual net output: 9,846 GW·h

External links
- Website: kolanpp.rosenergoatom.ru
- Commons: Related media on Commons

The Kola Nuclear Power Plant (Russian: Кольская АЭС []), also known as Kolsk NPP or Kolskaya NPP, is a nuclear power plant located 12 km away from Polyarnye Zori, Murmansk Oblast in north-western Russia. If the floating nuclear power plant Akademik Lomonosov is excluded, it is the northernmost nuclear power plant housed in a fixed location structure.

== History ==
Turbine Hall at the Kola Nuclear Power Plant

Reactor Unit 1 at the Kola Nuclear Power Plant

The Phase 1 (No. 1 and 2 reactors) at the Kola NPP went online in 1973 and 1974, respectively, and are part of Russia’s first generation of PWR reactors (the VVER 440/230 type). The Phase 2 (No. 3 and 4 reactors) went online in 1981 and 1984 with the improved VVER 440/213 type.

Phase 1 reactors were designed to work for 30 years and were originally slated to be shut down in 2003 and 2004. However, the shutdown did not happen. Instead, the operational life spans of the reactors were extended, after a massive safety upgrade effort that included about 200 safety systems upgrade projects and was financed in part by the governments of Norway, Sweden, Finland and USA.

== Today ==
Kola NPP produces about half of Murmansk Oblast's energy. The newest two reactors are of a similar reactor type to Finland's Loviisa Nuclear Power Plant, which conforms to regulatory requirements commonly considered to be the most stringent in the world.

== Reactor data ==
The Kola Nuclear Power Plant has four units:

Unit	Reactor type	Net capacity	Gross capacity	Construction started	Electricity Grid	Commercial Operation	Shutdown
Kola-1	VVER-440/230	411 MW	440 MW	1969-05-18	1973-06-29	1973-12-28	(2033)
Kola-2	VVER-440/230	411 MW	440 MW	1969-05-15	1974-12-08	1975-02-21	(2034)
Kola-3	VVER-440/213	411 MW	440 MW	1977-04-01	1981-03-24	1982-12-03	(2026)
Kola-4	VVER-440/213	411 MW	440 MW	1976-08-01	1984-10-11	1984-12-06	(2029)

== Campaign to close the station ==
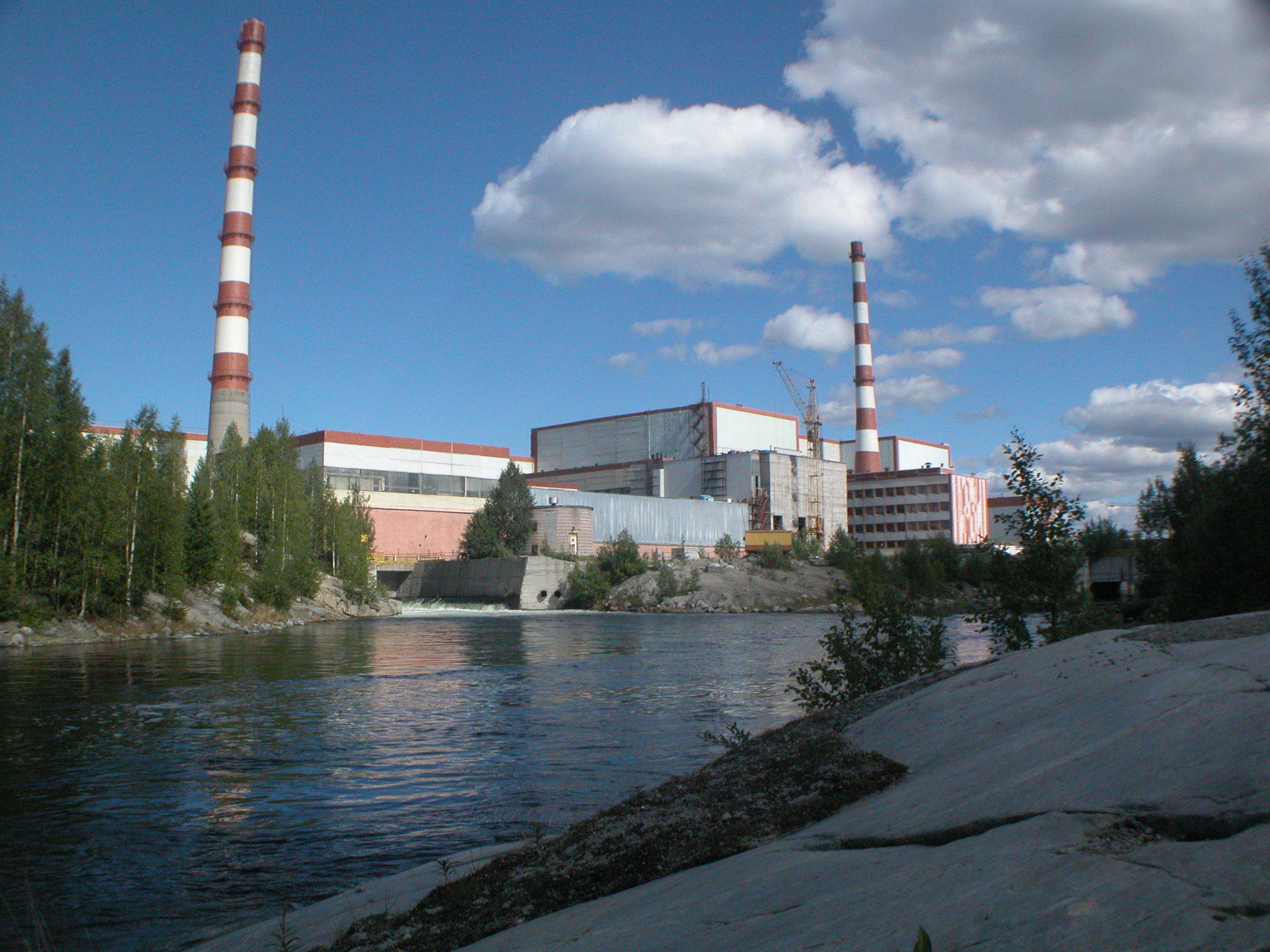
Kola Nuclear Power Plant in 2008

Several environment movement groups such as the ecologists from Norway and Russia support media campaign to close Kola NPP citing safety concerns with Phase 1 reactors and alleged violations of Russian law during issue of operating permit extensions.

The license for phase 1 reactors five-year operation extensions, granted by the Russian Federation's civilian nuclear regulator Gosatomnadzor (FSETAN’s predecessor), were issued without conducting an obligatory state environmental impact study. Conducting such federal level studies is mandated by the law "On Environmental Impact Studies" in Article 11.

The first extension for the old reactors was issued in summer 2003, almost precisely after former Deputy Minister of Atomic Energy Andrei Malyshev was installed as Gosatomnadzor’s chief. He replaced Yury Vishnevsky at this post. Vishnevsky had been an outspoken critic of the former Ministry of Atomic Energy, now known as the Federal Agency for Atomic energy, or Rosatom.

In April 2005, the Murmansk Regional Prosecutor issued a recommendation to resolve the violations surrounding the reactor life-span extensions and force regulatory bodies and Rosenergoatom, Russian's nuclear power plant operations conglomerate, to carry out the environmental impact studies. But none of this took place.

The Murmansk Prosecutors again ordered the state structures to fulfill the earlier order but was again unsuccessful. Norway's Nature and Youth and Norway-based Bellona’s "Environment and Rights" magazine first drew the attention of prosecutors to the illegality of prolonging the lifespans of the reactors in 2004.

Rostekhnadzor subsequently issued a license for the fifteen-year life extension of Unit 1 in June 2008, after further reviews, inspections and upgrade work.

== Kola II ==
Four VVER-S-600 units are planned for the Kola II NPP which is to be located a few kilometres from the existing Kola NPP. Construction of the first two units is expected to take place between 2027 and 2037. These Kola-II units will be able to potentially work on 100% MOX fuel (mix of uranium and plutonium).

VVER-S/600 will have 80 years' service life. The letter 'S' in the name means spectral shift control.

== See also ==
- Nuclear power in Russia
