= Novovoronezh Nuclear Power Plant =

Nuclear power plant in Russia

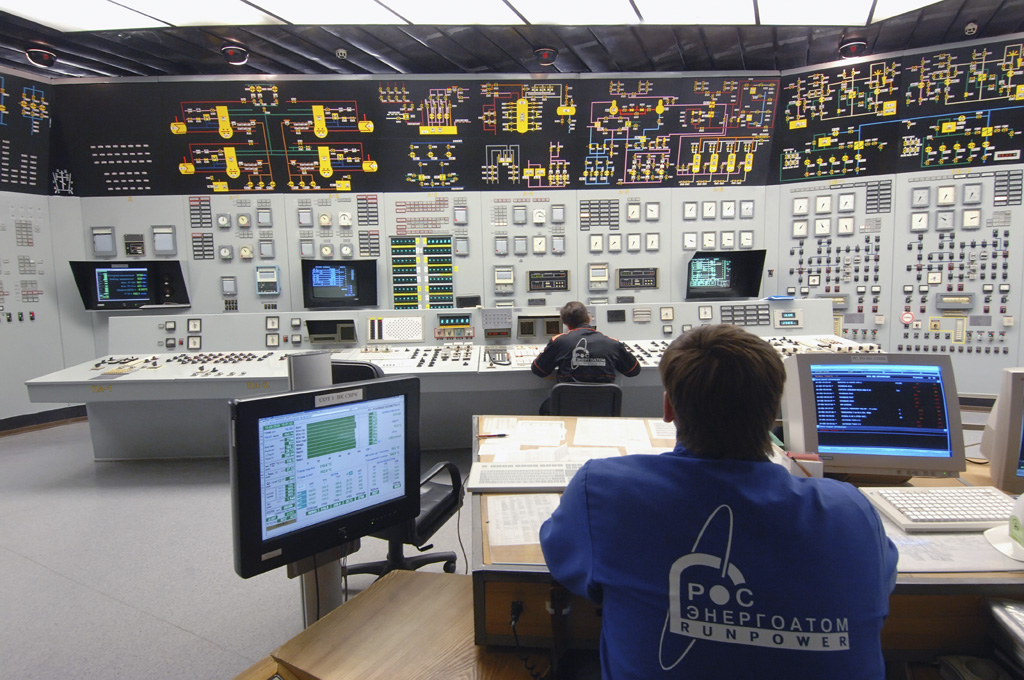
- Novovoronezh NPP
- Official name: Нововоронежская АЭС
- Country: Russia
- Coordinates: 51°16′30″N 39°12′0″E
- Status: Operational
- Construction began: 1957
- Commission date: September 30, 1964
- Operator: Rosenergoatom

Nuclear power station
- Reactor type: 1 × VVER-210; 1 × VVER-365; 2 × VVER-440/179; 1 × VVER-1000/187
- Cooling towers: 9 × Natural Draft
- Cooling source: Don River

Power generation
- Units operational: 1 × 417 MW; 1 × 1000 MW
- Units decommissioned: 1 × 210 MW; 1 × 365 MW; 1 × 417 MW
- Nameplate capacity: 1417 MW
- Capacity factor: 77.9%
- Annual net output: 12,523 GW·h

External links
- Website: www.nvnpp.vrn.ru
- Commons: Related media on Commons

The Novovoronezh nuclear power station (Russian: Нововоронежская АЭС []) is a nuclear power station close to Novovoronezh in Voronezh Oblast, central Russia. The power station was vital to the development of the VVER design: every unit built was essentially a prototype of its design. On this site is built the Novovoronezh Nuclear Power Plant II.

== History ==
In 2002 Novovoronezh-3 was modernised and life extended, including new safety systems.

In 2010 Novovoronezh-5 was shut down for modernization to extend its operating life for an additional 25 years, the first VVER-1000 to undergo such an operating life extension. The works include the modernization of management, protection and emergency systems, and improvement of security and radiation safety systems.

As of 2018 unit 4 is undergoing modernisation work for a 15-year life extension, taking its operational life to 60 years. This involved annealing its reactor pressure vessel and using parts from the recently shutdown unit 3.

On 7 October 2025, a drone struck a cooling tower at the Novovoronezh NPP. The drone strike detonation “left a dark mark on the cooling tower”. Believed to be a Ukrainian drone suppressed by Russian Electronic Warfare. Ukraine didn’t respond to the allegation.

== Reactor data ==
The Novovoronezh Nuclear Power Plant has five units:

Unit	Reactor type	Net capacity	Gross capacity	Construction started	Electricity Grid	Commercial Operation	Shutdown
Novovoronezh-1	VVER-210 (prototype)	197 MW	210 MW	1957-07-01	1964-09-30	1964-12-31	1988-02-16
Novovoronezh-2	VVER-365 (prototype)	336 MW	365 MW	1964-06-01	1969-12-27	1970-04-14	1990-08-29
Novovoronezh-3	VVER-440/179 (prototype)	385 MW	417 MW	1967-07-01	1971-12-27	1972-06-29	2016-12-25
Novovoronezh-4	VVER-440/179	385 MW	417 MW	1967-07-01	1972-12-28	1973-03-24	2032 planned
Novovoronezh-5	VVER-1000/187 (prototype)	950 MW	1,000 MW	1974-03-01	1980-05-31	1981-02-20	2035 planned

== Gallery ==
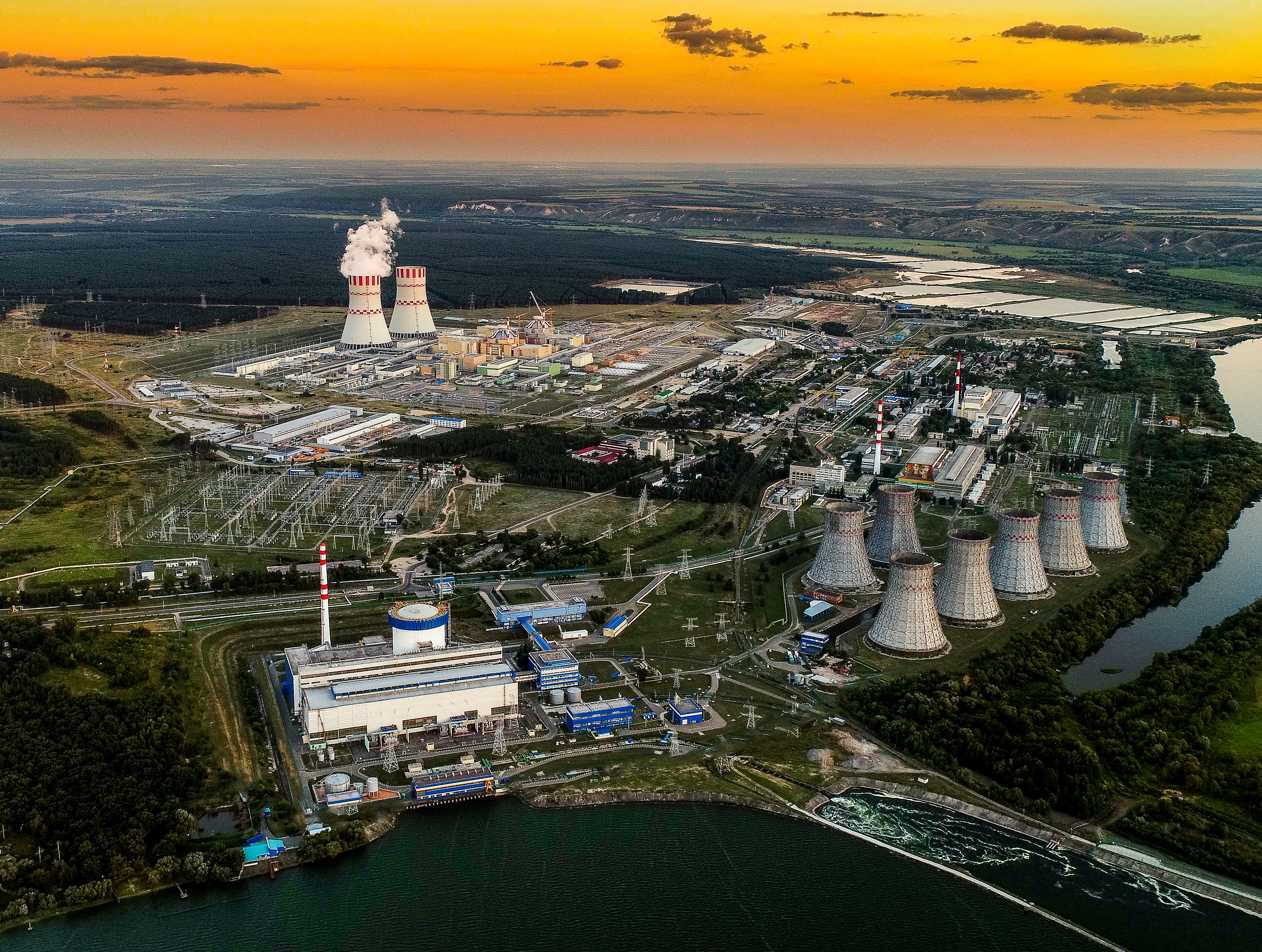

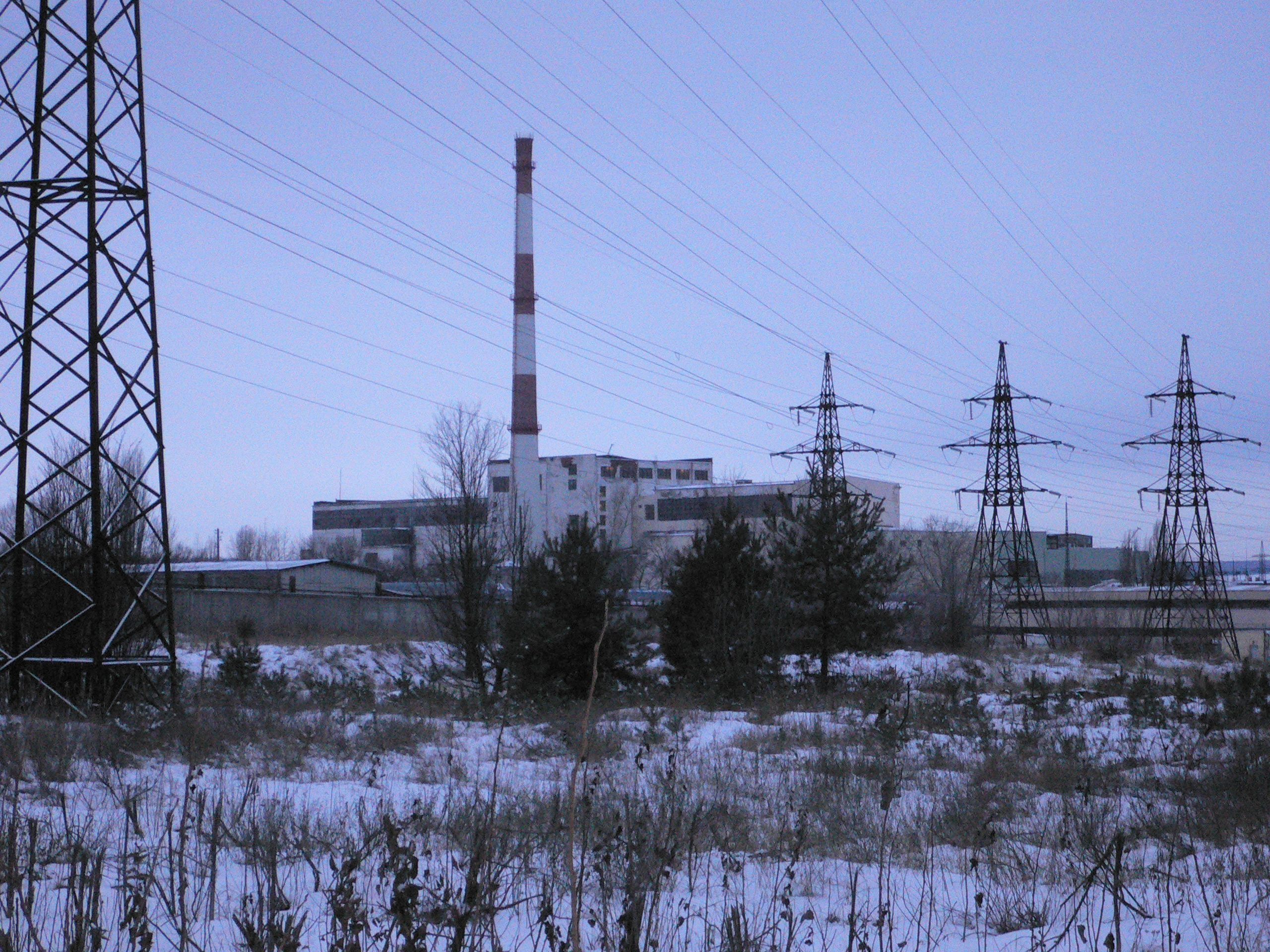
Unit 1 and 2

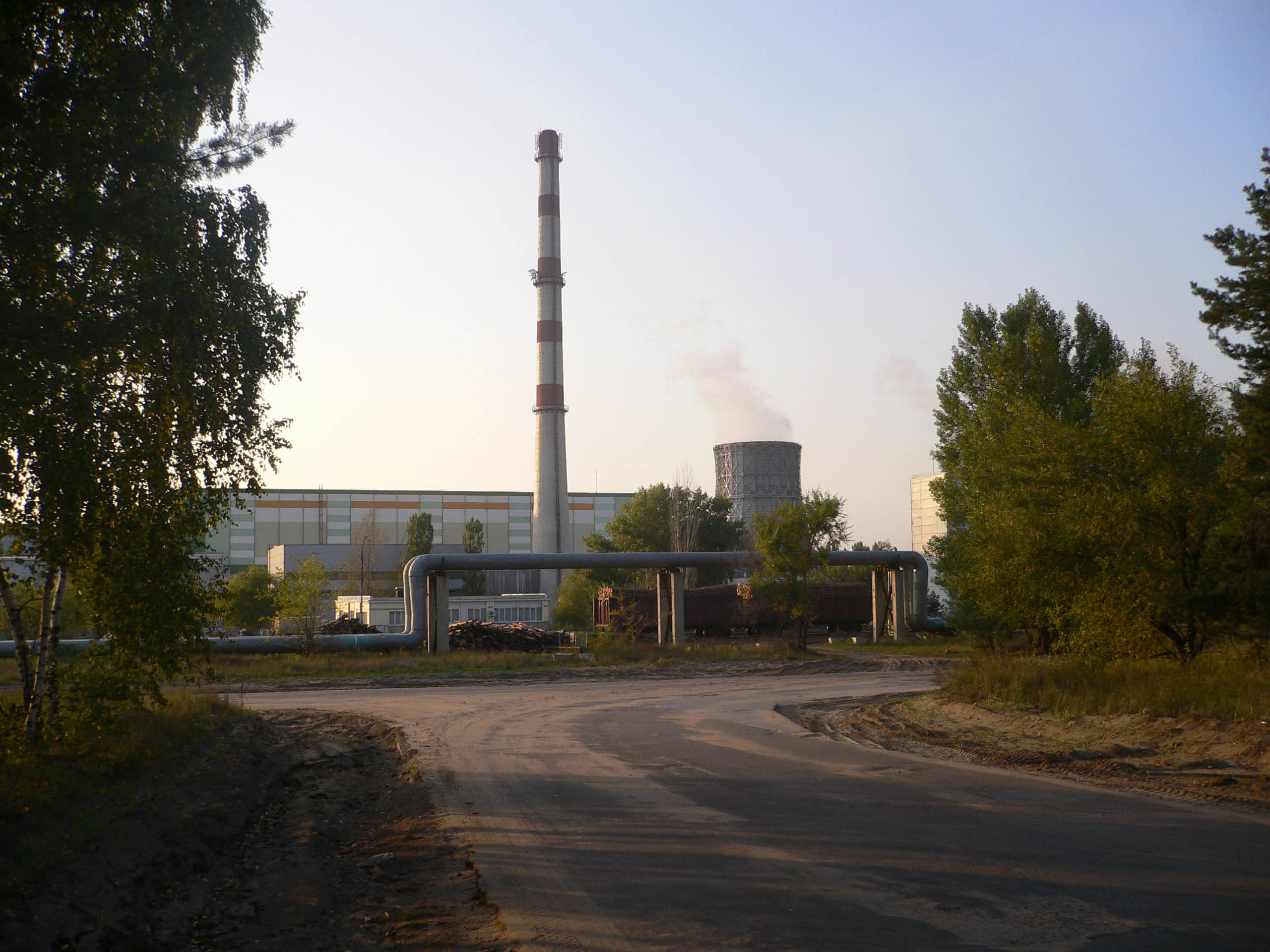
Units 3 and 4

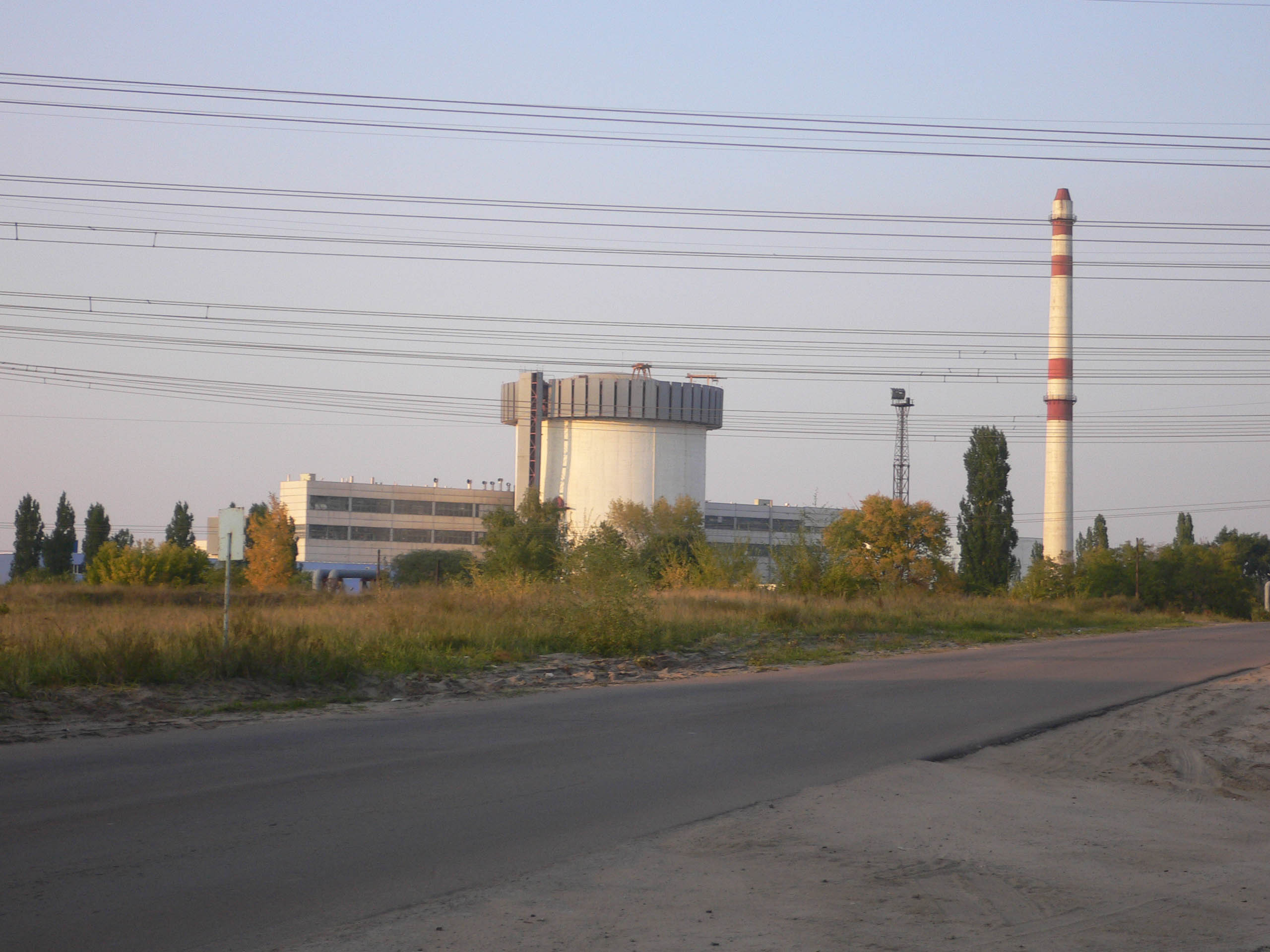
Unit 5

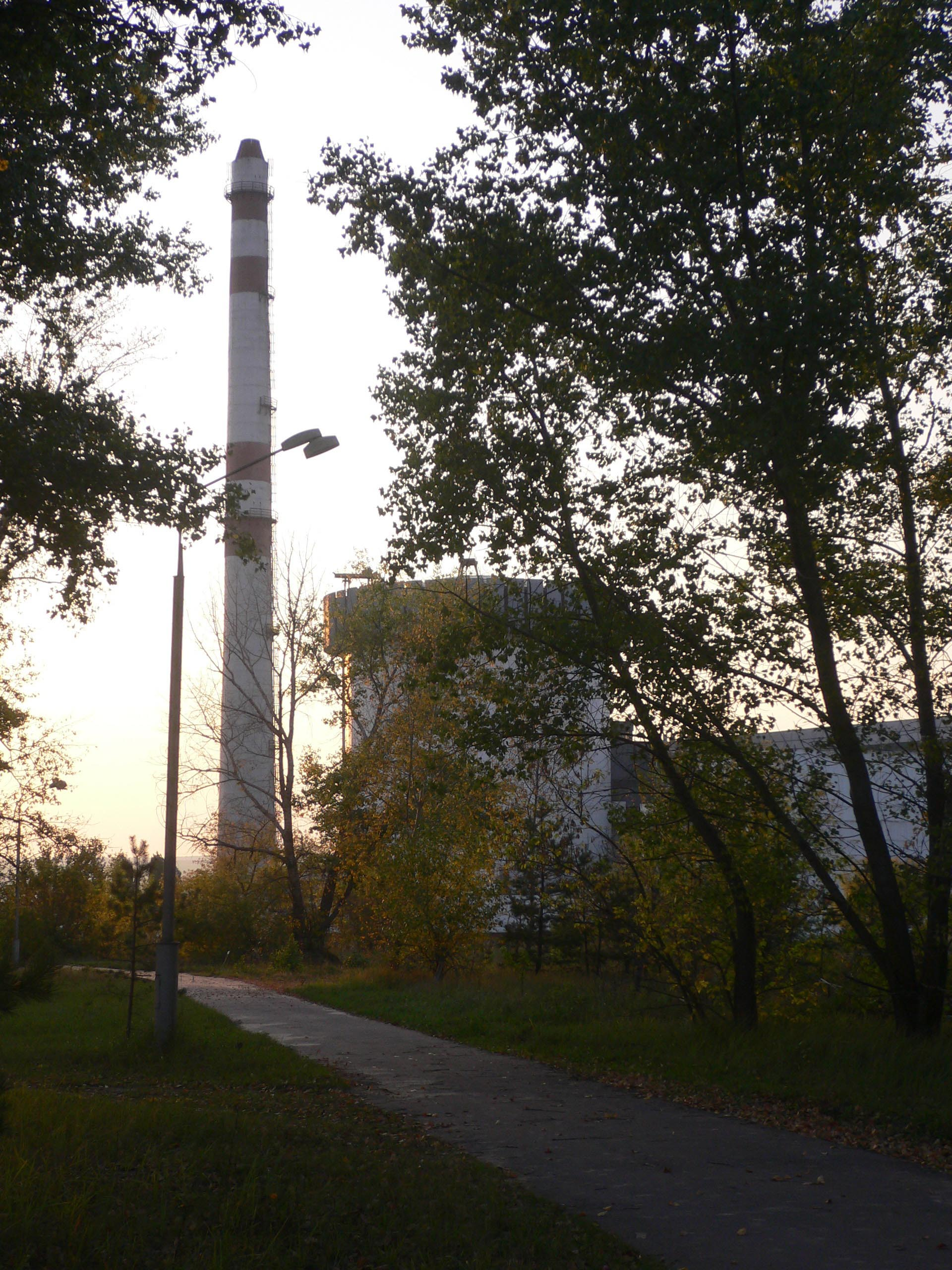
Unit 5

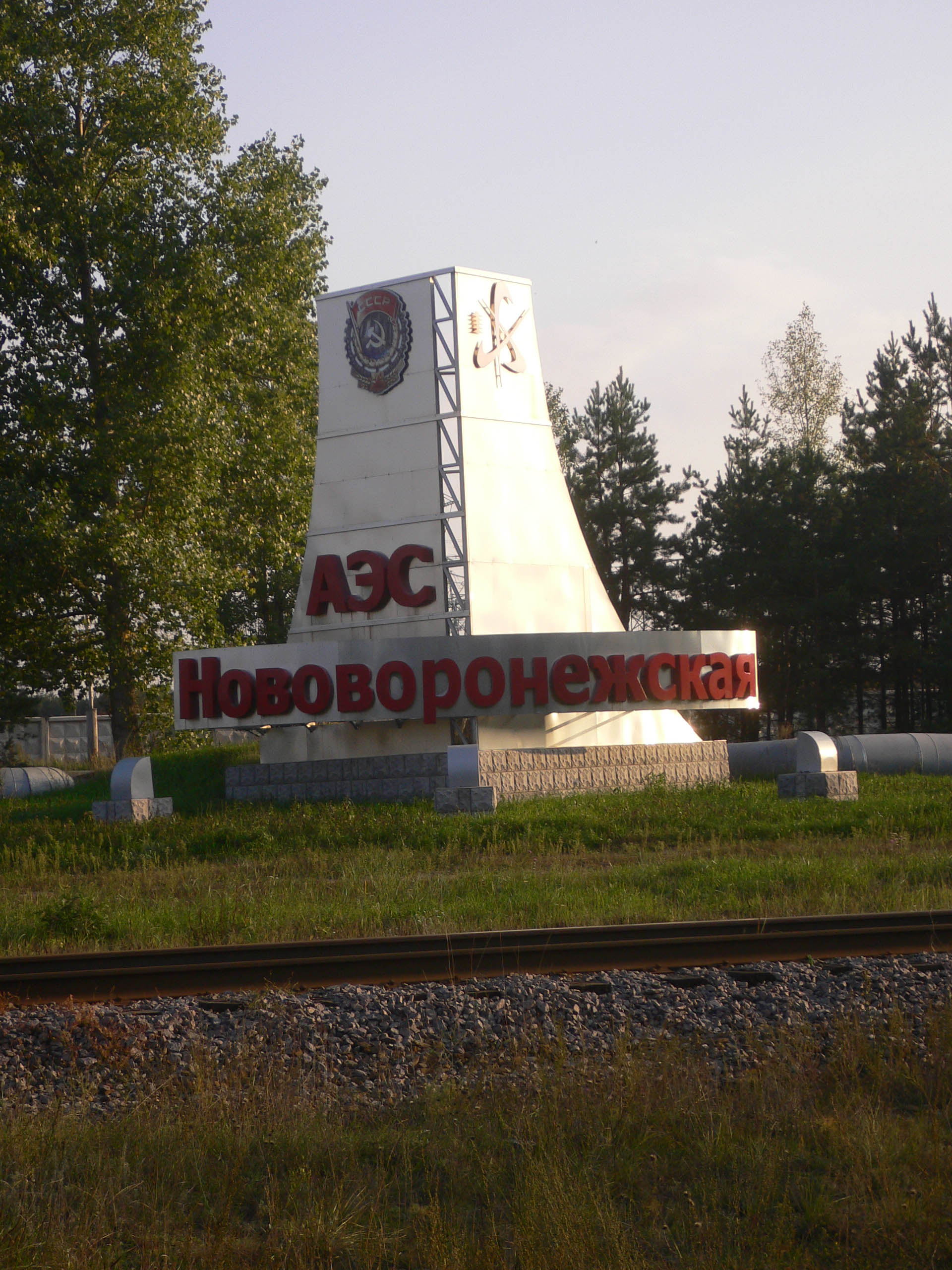
Entrance to the nuclear power plant

== See also ==
- Nuclear power in Russia
