= Rostov Nuclear Power Plant =

Nuclear power plant in Volgodonsk, Russia

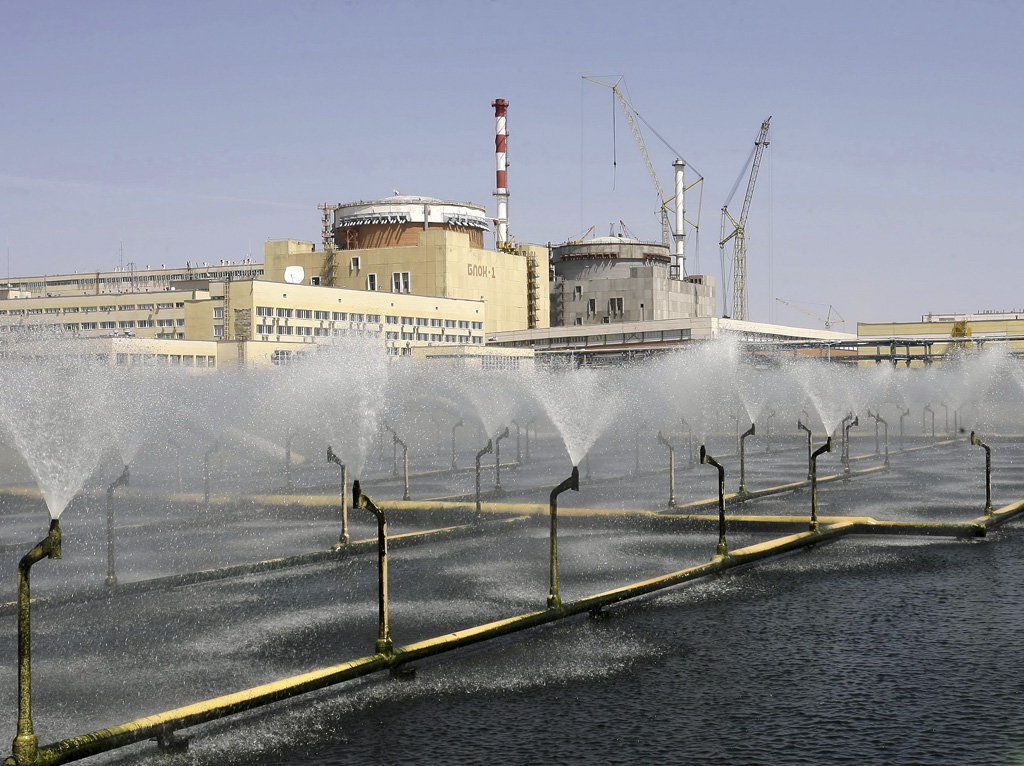
- Spray ponds and units 1 & 2 of the Rostov Nuclear Power Plant
- Official name: Ростовская атомная электростанция
- Country: Russia
- Location: Volgodonsk
- Coordinates: 47°35′57.63″N 42°22′18.76″E
- Status: Operational
- Construction began: 1977
- Commission date: 2001
- Operator: Rosenergoatom

Nuclear power station
- Reactor type: VVER-1000/320
- Reactor supplier: Atomstroyexport

Power generation
- Units operational: 3 × 1,000 MW; 1 × 1,030 MW
- Make and model: Kharkov Turbine Plant; Electrosila
- Nameplate capacity: 4,030 MW

External links
- Website: Rostov NPP
- Commons: Related media on Commons

The Rostov Nuclear Power Plant (Russian: Ростовская АЭС), also known as the Volgodonsk Nuclear Power Plant (Russian: Волгодонская АЭС), is a Russian nuclear power plant located on the left bank of Tsimlyansk Reservoir in the lower stream of the Don river near Volgodonsk, Rostov Oblast.

Construction of Rostov reactor No. 1 began in 1977 and operations began in 2001. Construction of reactor No. 2 commenced in 1983 and finished in 2010. Unit 3 was connected to the electrical grid for the first time in December 2015. Unit 4 underwent first criticality on 7 December 2017, and put into commercial operation on 28 September 2018. Units 3 and 4 are of an upgraded VVER-1000/320 subtype.

The post–Soviet Union revival of the nuclear industry of Russia took place at Rostov in the early 2000s, with the completion of the building of unit 2 in 2010, unit 3 in 2015 and unit 4 in 2017. Unit 4 was the last VVER-1000/V-320 reactor built.

== Reactors ==
Unit	Reactor type	Net capacity	Gross capacity	Construction started	Commercial operation	Shutdown
Rostov 1	VVER-1000/320	950 MW	1000 MW	1 September 1981	25 December 2001	-
Rostov 2	VVER-1000/320	950 MW	1000 MW	1 May 1983	10 December 2010	-
Rostov 3	VVER-1000/320	950 MW	1000 MW	15 September 2009	17 September 2015	-
Rostov 4	VVER-1000/320	1011 MW	1030 MW	16 June 2010	28 September 2018	-

== Accidents and incidents ==
November 4, 2014 — an emergency shutdown of two power units occurred at the Rostov NPP, the supply of electricity to consumers was stopped, it took five to six hours to restore operation. The shutdown of the power units occurred due to the tripping of the protection.

On 21 October 2021, unit 2 at the Rostov Nuclear Power Plant activated emergency shutdown procedures and put on maintenance mode due to a crack in the welded joint on the pipeline and resulting steam leak.

On 31 December 2022, a fire broke out in unit 3's block transformer under maintenance, killing one and severely injuring another.

July 16, 2024 — the power unit of the Rostov NPP was shut down due to the activation of automation due to the malfunction of the turbogenerator. The amount of temporary restrictions in the southern power system immediately after the accident reached 1.5 GW. After restoration works, the deficit decreased to 500 MW. restrictions on electricity consumption were introduced in the southern regions, the lights went out in the temporarily occupied Crimea.

== See also ==
- Nuclear power in Russia
