= Kaliningrad Nuclear Power Plant =

Nuclear power plant which was under construction in Russia

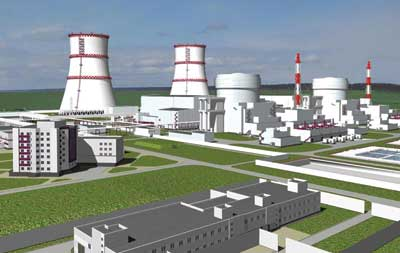
- Official name: Baltiiskaya NPP
- Country: Russia
- Location: Neman, Kaliningrad Oblast
- Coordinates: 54°56′20″N 22°09′40″E
- Status: construction suspended
- Construction began: 25 February 2010
- Owner: Rosenergoatom
- Operator: Rosenergoatom

Nuclear power station
- Reactor type: VVER-1200/491
- Reactor supplier: Atomenergoprom
- Cooling towers: 2

Power generation
- Units under const.: 2 × 1,170 MW
- Nameplate capacity: 2,340 MW

External links
- Website: baltnpp.rosenergoatom.ru
- Commons: Related media on Commons

The Kaliningrad Nuclear Power Plant (also referred as Baltic Nuclear Power Plant (NPP) or Baltiiskaya NPP, Russian: Калининградская атомная электростанция; Калининградская АЭС [] or Балтийская АЭС []) is a nuclear power plant which was under construction 13 kilometres (8.1 mi) south-east of Neman, in Kaliningrad Oblast, Russia. It was seen as a counter-project to the (later scrapped) plan to build the Visaginas nuclear power plant in Lithuania and was considered not only as an energy, but also as a geopolitical project. Originally intending to commission the reactors in 2016 and 2018, construction was temporarily stopped in June 2013 for the project to be redesigned for lower power output after neighbouring countries showed no interest in importing its electricity. However, the downgrade was later discarded. No export partners materialised as of 2021 and the project remains in stand-by.

== Motivation ==
The excess electricity was planned to be exported into the EU market. According to Sergey Boyarkin, deputy general director of Rosenergoatom, the first reactor would be sufficient for Kaliningrad Oblast's needs, while electricity produced by the second reactor would be exported when not filling gaps in generation caused by refuelling and downtime. Lithuania, Poland and Germany were named as potential export markets.

Sergey Boyarkin said that the shutdown of Ignalina Nuclear Power Plant combined with Polish plans to scrap coal-fired generation in compliance with environmental regulation meant that the Baltic region faced an energy crisis by 2015. He also said that Kaliningrad Oblast would be isolated from electricity supplies from Russia if the Baltic states de-synchronized themselves from the Russian electricity grid and joined the synchronous grid of Continental Europe (which they did in 2025). He also mentioned technical complications and unreliability in electricity transfer from Smolensk Nuclear Power Plant, which was the main supplier of Kaliningrad Oblast, via Belarus and Lithuania.

On the other hand, the project was seen as a counter-project to the Visaginas nuclear power plant project in Lithuania. Russia invited Lithuania to participate in the project, instead of building the nuclear power plant in Lithuania.

== History ==
A framework construction agreement was signed between the head of Rosatom Sergei Kiriyenko and Governor of Kaliningrad Oblast Georgy Boos on 16 April 2008. Russian Prime Minister Vladimir Putin signed the order for construction of the 2,300 MW plant in September 2009. Ground preparation works started on 25 February 2010. The first concrete was scheduled to be laid in April 2011, but was delayed until February 2012.

On 4 June 2013, an order of Atomenergoproject, dated 30 May 2013 and published on 4 June 2013, ordered a series of staffing and budgeting overhauls "in connection with the mothballing of the Baltic NPP and NIAEP budget adjustments for 2013." It was later said that the project would be temporary stopped to reconsider the project's design in case there would be no export to the European Union. On 4 July 2013, Sergey Kiriyenko, head of Rosatom, announced that both units would be built like previously planned, with two VVER-1200 and no smaller reactor.

== Technical features ==
The original design had foreseen two VVER-1200/491 pressurized water reactors in an AES-2006 standard design configuration. The reactors have a capacity of 1150 MWe each and would be supplied by Atomstroyexport.

The first reactor was planned to be operational by 2017 and the second reactor by 2018. Cost was expected to be around €6.8 billion (US$8.8 billion) Two further reactors could be added in the future depending on economic development in Kaliningrad and in the Baltic region in general.

The redesigned plan would have consisted of two reactors of 640 MW (VVER-640) and 40 MW (KLT-40S) capacity. An alternative foresaw up to eight 40 MW reactors.

== Project development ==
The project was developed by Rosatom's subsidiary Inter RAO UES. According to Rosatom, 49% of shares in the project would have been offered to European companies. This would have been the first Russian nuclear power plant with foreign participation. Potential investors named in this context were ČEZ, Enel, and Iberdrola. However no foreign partner joined the project.

== See also ==
- Nuclear power in Russia
