= Uzbekistan Nuclear Power Plant =

Nuclear power plant in the stage of construction in Uzbekistan

- Country: Uzbekistan
- Location: Jizzakh Province
- Coordinates: 40°35′00″N 67°20′00″E
- Status: Under construction
- Construction began: April 2025
- Construction cost: ~ 2 Billion USD 2 SMRs + 14 billion USD 2 large VVER-1000

Nuclear power station
- Reactor type: RITM-200N
- Reactor supplier: Atomstroyexport
- Thermal capacity: 2 × 330 MW_{t}, 2 × 3000 MW_{t} (planned)

Power generation
- Units under const.: 2 × 55 MW
- Nameplate capacity: 2100 MW (planned)

Uzbekistan Nuclear Power Plant is a small modular type (SMR) nuclear plant being constructed in Jizzakh province of Uzbekistan. The agreement for this project was signed on 27 May 2024, during the visit of Russian President Vladimir Putin to Uzbekistan. It is expected that the first unit will be commissioned in 2029. The cost of this project is expected to be below two billion USD

As per the Head of Uzbekistan’s Atomic Energy Agency, the importance of nuclear energy in his country is to reduce Uzbekistan's dependence on imported fossil fuels.

As per supplemental agreement signed by the end of September 2025, the construction plans have changed. Instead of six RITM-200N units, the plant will only consist of two of these SMRs, with two large-scale VVER-1000 units, replacing remaining four SMRs. That brings the total planned power output to 2,100 MW_{e} (instead of previous 330 MW_{e}). Pouring of the first concrete, for construction of the first SMR reactor building (not the reactor island yet), has already commenced by the end of March, 2026. First safety-related concrete has been poured, after a ceremony, on July 5, 2026. This event marks the official start of power plant construction.
