= Rheinsberg Nuclear Power Plant =

Nuclear reactor in East Germany

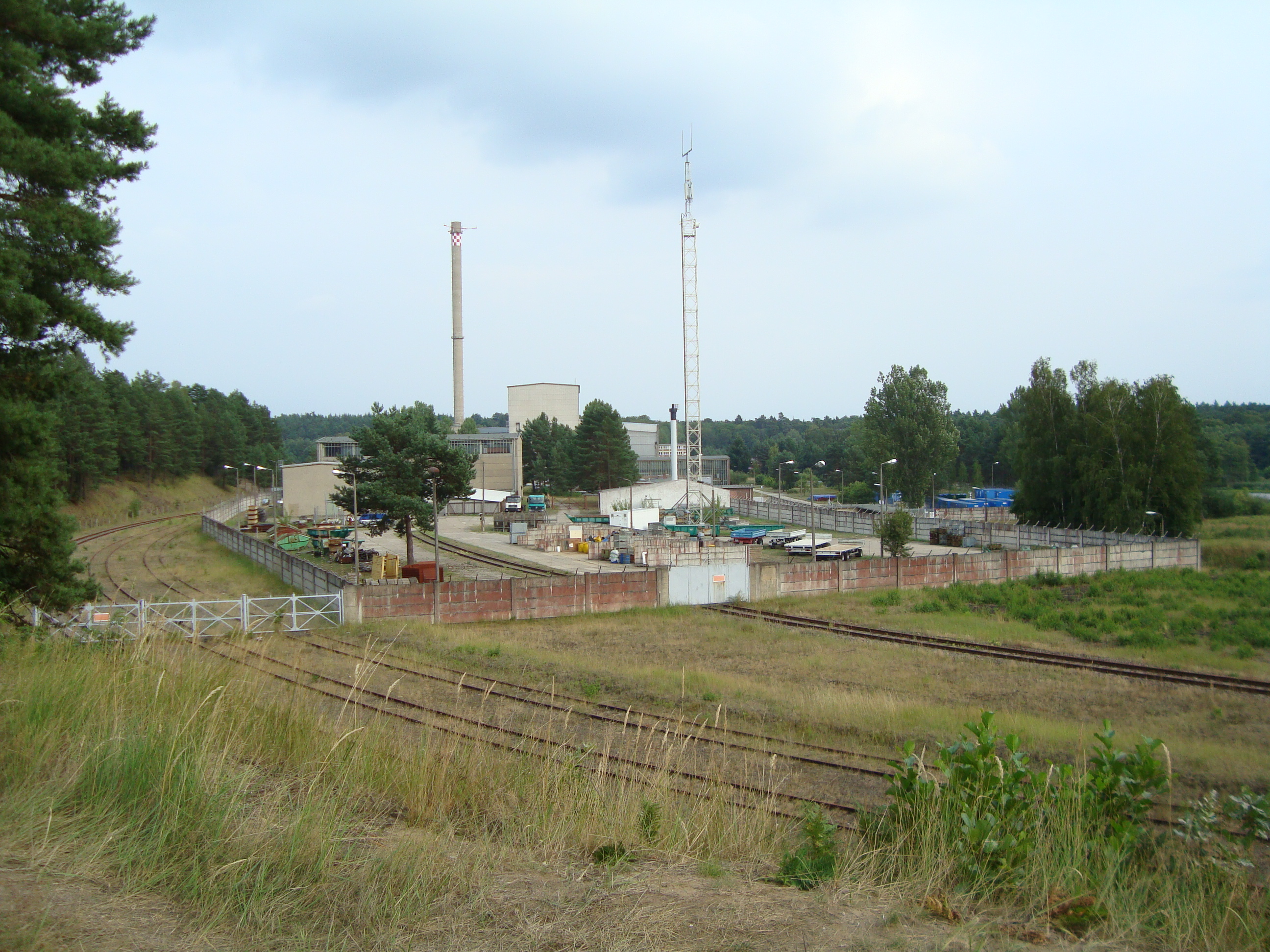
- Country: Germany, formerly East Germany
- Coordinates: 53°8′49.17″N 12°59′24.54″E
- Status: Decommissioned
- Construction began: 1956
- Commission date: October 11, 1966
- Decommission date: June 1, 1990
- Operator: Energiewerke Nord

Nuclear power station
- Reactor type: VVER

Power generation
- Units decommissioned: 1 x 70 MW

External links
- Commons: Related media on Commons

Rheinsberg Nuclear Power Station (German: Kernkraftwerk Rheinsberg, KKR) was the second nuclear reactor in East Germany after the Rossendorf Research Reactor, and the first nuclear power reactor in East Germany. It was built close to the city of Rheinsberg on the Stechlinsee. The power station was one of the first generation of demonstration power reactors.

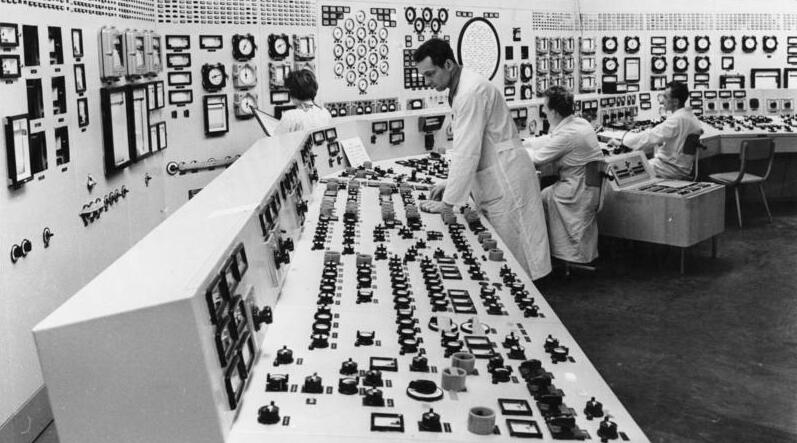
Control room in 1966

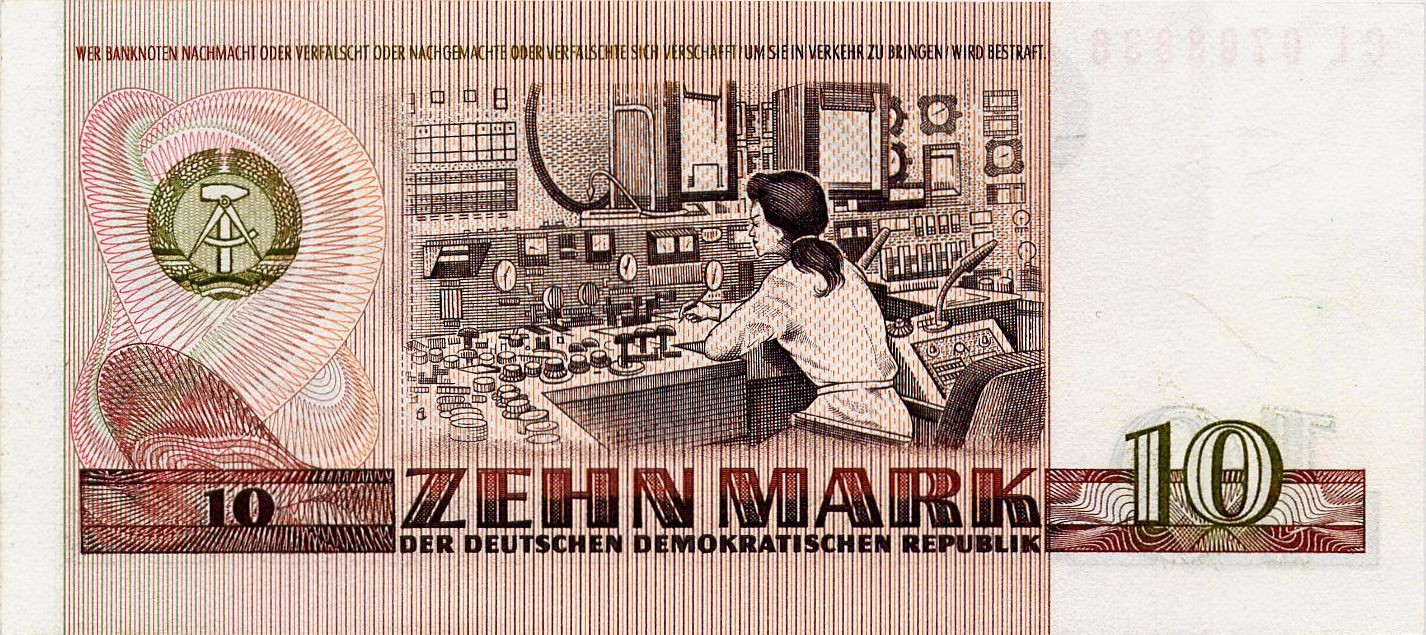
Engraving on 10 Mark DDR banknote

== Start-up ==
The project commenced in 1956, and construction began January 1, 1960. First criticality followed on March 11, 1966 (the reactor was not pressurised at that time however). Full start-up was on May 9, and commercial power production began on October 11, 1966.

== Achievement ==
The single pressurized water reactor was of Soviet design – type VVER-210. Gross power of the station was 70 MWe, but 8 MWe was required to run plant systems, so net output to the grid was 62 MWe. Gross power output was subsequently raised to 75 MWe and then 80 MWe as operating experience increased. Cooling water was taken from the Nehmitzsee and by a special discharge channel was discharged into the Stechlinsee. The plant accumulated 130,000 hours of operating time.

== Safety ==
The worst accident occurring in 1973 at the plant during operation was classified as an INES level-2 event. A tear in tubing in a cooling circuit was noticed quickly and was repaired. In 2011, Deutschlandradio Kultur produced a radioplay about this event. Rheinsberger Restlaufzeit combines a fictional story with original sound clips of the former spokesman of the nuclear power plant as he reconstructs the events of 1973.

== End of operations and decommissioning ==
The power plant had been scheduled to be operated for 20 years until 1987; in 1986 (after renovation work) this was extended to 1992. However, on 1 June 1990 the impending German reunification (which was completed three months later) put an end to operations, when the power station was permanently shut down by the last East-German government due to safety concerns.

Since 1995 the plant has been undergoing decommissioning activities conducted by the company previously operating the plant during its active life (Energiewerke Nord GmbH). Radioactive materials are being moved to a temporary storage facility.

The area is under consideration for either site "greening" or conversion into an industrial park once the plant has been dismantled.

The decommissioning costs are estimated to be 1 billion Euro. The ground water has been contaminated, and the buildings have higher amount of contamination than expected, which will delay decommissioning.

== Picture on East German Currency ==
The engraving on the reverse of the 1971 series East German 10 Mark banknote shows a female engineer at the control console of the Rheinsberg plant. The obverse features women's rights advocate Clara Zetkin.

== See also ==
- Nuclear power in Germany
- Repository for radioactive waste Morsleben

Nuclear plants built in the former East Germany

- Stendal Nuclear Power Plant
- Greifswald Nuclear Power Plant
