= Stendal nuclear power plant =

Planned nuclear power plant in Germany

Stendal Nuclear Power Plant
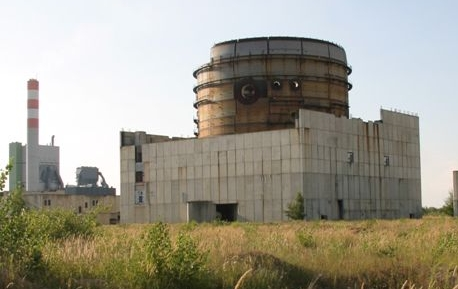
- The ruins of Stendal NPP reactor building construction
- Country: Germany, previously East Germany
- Coordinates: 52°43′26.88″N 12°1′9.57″E
- Status: Cancelled
- Construction began: 1 December 1982

Nuclear power station
- Reactor type: VVER

Power generation
- Units cancelled: 4 × 1,000 MWe

External links
- Commons: Related media on Commons

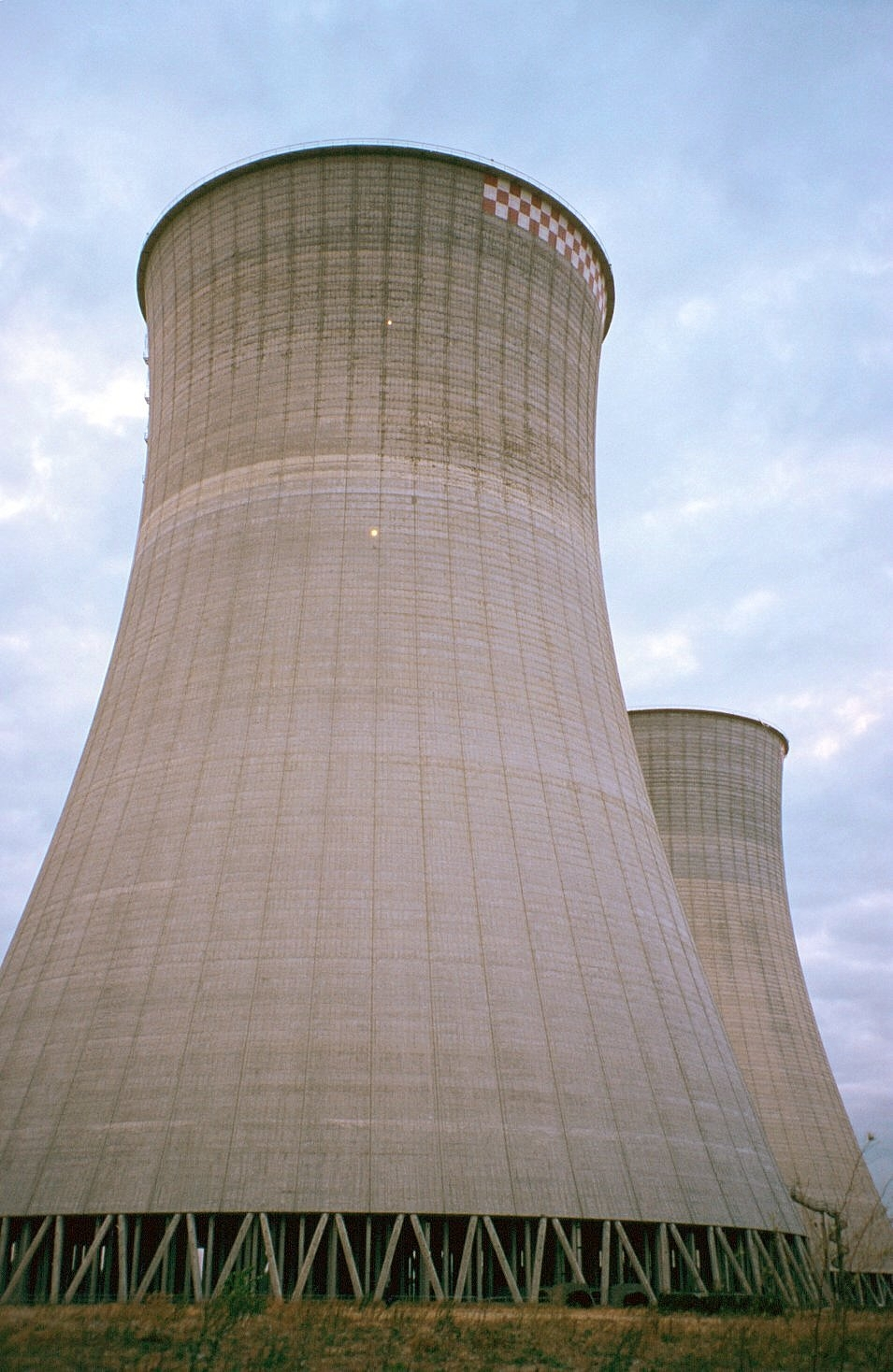
Two cooling towers (1995)

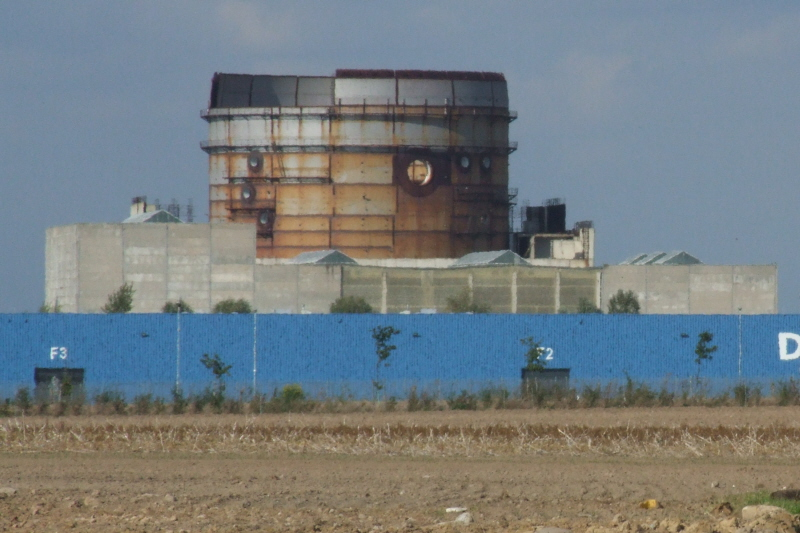
The remains of the reactor building

Stendal Nuclear Power Station (German: Kernkraftwerk Stendal) is a nuclear power station which was never completed. It was located in East Germany, near the city of Arneburg, Stendal in Bezirk Magdeburg, today's Saxony-Anhalt.

== History ==
The power station was planned to become the largest nuclear power station of East Germany – also the largest nuclear power station in all of Germany. However, after German reunification the safety of the Soviet design was questioned, and all plans for operation and further construction were halted.

Altogether, the site was planned to house four reactors of the VVER-1000/320 type, which were some of the most modern and largest units of their time with an electrical generating capacity of 1000MWe. Construction of units 1 and 2 began in 1983 while units 3 and 4 remained in planning. Once construction of the plant was suspended in 1990, unit 1 was about 85% finished and unit 2 was about 15% finished.

The above-ground connecting building between all units has been demolished. The emergency diesel generators for unit 1 were completed and still stand almost entirely intact.

The power station was planned to have two cooling towers per reactor, as was typical with similar Soviet designs. The turbine house was connected to the reactor buildings and each reactor had its own turbine and cooling towers in the designs. Several operating plants today have such a design, notably the Temelin Nuclear Power Plant in the Czech Republic.

An innovation for the Stendal plant was that the reactor pressure vessel (RPV) plans were modified heavily by the company SKET in Magdeburg in connection with the planning office in Moscow. It was to be constructed with a new steel cell composite technique, which differed from other similar plants. This RPV was produced, but was then divided and scrapped in 1990/1991 as part of the site's deconstruction.

Due to the German reunification, the construction was stopped and the three completed cooling towers were demolished in 1994 and 1999 with explosives.

The area is an industrial estate today.

== See also ==
- Nuclear power in Germany

Nuclear plants built in the former East Germany

- Greifswald Nuclear Power Plant
- Rheinsberg Nuclear Power Plant
