= VVER =

Soviet / Russian nuclear reactor type

VVER reactor class
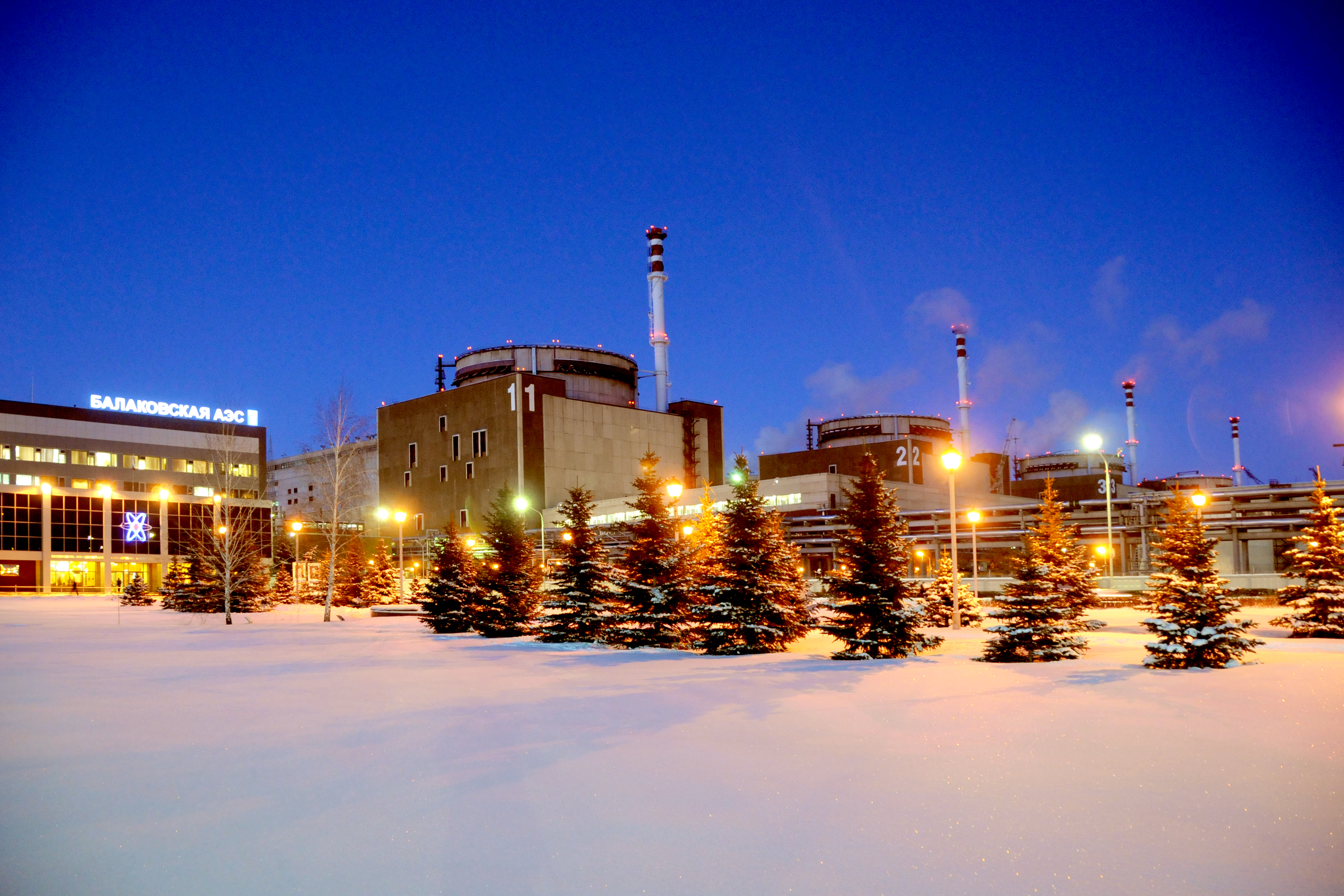
- View of the Balakovo Nuclear Power Plant site, with four operational VVER-1000 reactors
- Generation: Generation I reactor Generation II reactor Generation III reactor Generation III+ reactor
- Reactor concept: Pressurized water reactor
- Reactor line: VVER (Voda Voda Energo Reactor)
- Reactor types: VVER-210; VVER-365; VVER-440; VVER-1000; VVER-1200; VVER-TOI

Main parameters of the reactor core
- Fuel (fissile material): ^{235}U (LEU)
- Fuel state: Solid
- Neutron energy spectrum: Thermal
- Primary control method: Control rods
- Primary moderator: Water
- Primary coolant: Liquid (light water)

Reactor usage
- Primary use: Generation of electricity
- Power (thermal): VVER-210: 760 MW_{th} VVER-365: 1,325 MW_{th} VVER-440: 1,375 MW_{th} VVER-1000: 3,000 MW_{th} VVER-1200: 3,212 MW_{th} VVER-TOI: 3,300 MW_{th}
- Power (electric): VVER-210: 210 MW_{el} VVER-365: 365 MW_{el} VVER-440: 440 MW_{el} VVER-1000: 1,000 MW_{el} VVER-1200: 1,200 MW_{el} VVER-TOI: 1,300 MW_{el}

The water-water energetic reactor (WWER), or VVER (from Russian: водо-водяной энергетический реактор (ВВЭР), romanized: vodo-vodyanoi enyergeticheskiy reaktor) is a series of pressurized water reactor designs developed in the Soviet Union and Russia by OKB Gidropress. The name refers to the use of water as both the nuclear coolant and the neutron moderator, in a reactor intended for energy generation.

The idea of such a reactor was proposed at the Kurchatov Institute by Savely Moiseevich Feinberg. The first prototype VVER-210 was built at the Novovoronezh Nuclear Power Plant before the 1970s, as one of two initial Soviet reactor designs (the other being the RBMK). There have been several subsequent generations of VVER design, so the name is associated with substantially different reactors from original generation I to modern generation III+ designs. Electrical power output ranges from 70 to 1300 MWe, with designs of up to 1700 MWe currently in development.

VVER power stations have been installed in Russia, Ukraine, Belarus, Armenia, China, the Czech Republic, Finland, Hungary, Slovakia, Bulgaria, India, and Iran. Countries that are planning to introduce VVER reactors include Bangladesh, Egypt, Jordan, Turkey, Uzbekistan and Vietnam. Germany shut down its older generation VVER reactors in 1989-90, and cancelled those under construction.

== History ==
The earliest VVERs were built before 1970. The VVER-440 Model V230 was the most common design, delivering 440 MW of electrical power. The V230 employs six primary coolant loops each with a horizontal steam generator. A modified version of VVER-440, Model V213, was a product of the first nuclear safety standards adopted by Soviet designers. This model includes added emergency core cooling and auxiliary feedwater systems as well as upgraded accident localization systems.

The larger VVER-1000 was developed after 1975 and is a four-loop system housed in a containment-type structure with a spray steam suppression system (Emergency Core Cooling System). VVER reactor designs have been elaborated to incorporate automatic control, passive safety and containment systems associated with Western generation III reactors.

The VVER-1200 is the version currently offered for construction, being an evolution of the VVER-1000 with increased power output to about 1200 MWe (gross) and providing additional passive safety features.

In 2012, Rosatom stated that in the future it intended to certify the VVER with the British and U.S. regulatory authorities, though was unlikely to apply for a British licence before 2015.

The construction of the first VVER-1300 (VVER-TOI) 1300 MWE unit was started in 2018.

== Design ==
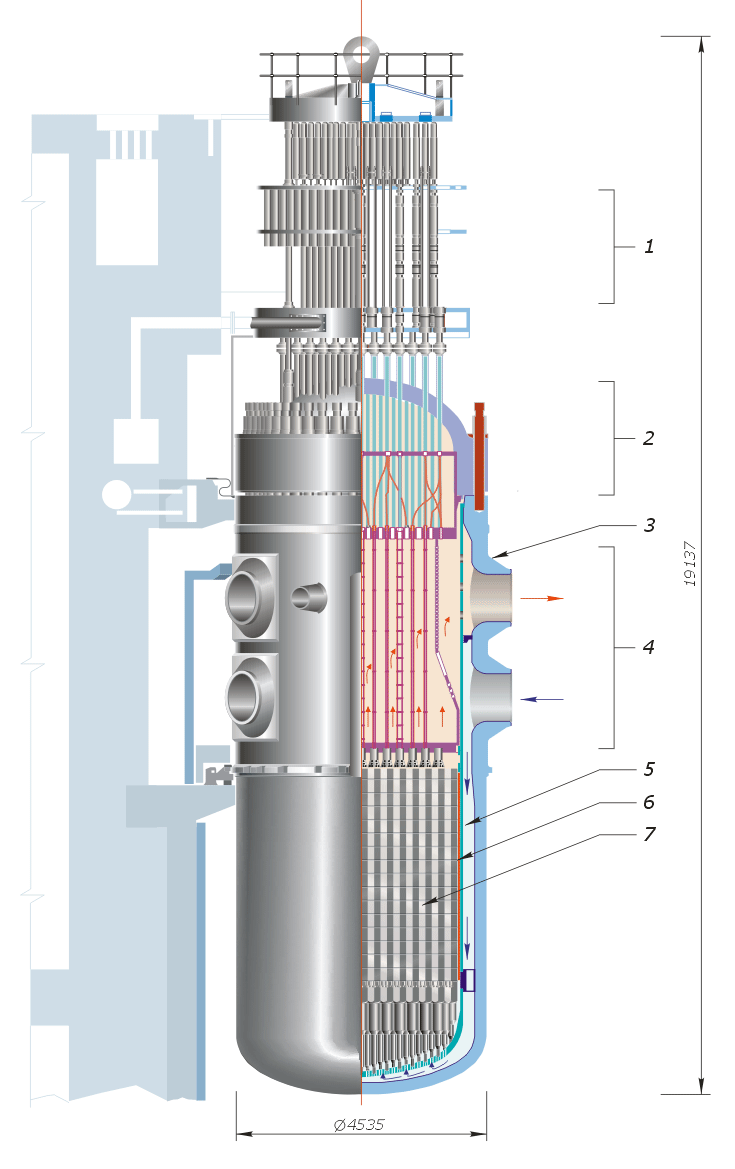
VVER-1000 (direct transliteration of Russian ВВЭР-1000), a 1000 MWe Russian nuclear power reactor of PWR type. 1: control rod drives 2: reactor cover or vessel head 3: Reactor pressure vessel 4: inlet and outlet nozzles 5: reactor core barrel or core shroud 6: reactor core 7: fuel rods

The arrangement of hexagonal fuel assemblies compared to a Westinghouse PWR design. Note that there are 163 assemblies on this hexagonal arrangement and 193 on the Westinghouse arrangement.

The Russian abbreviation VVER stands for 'water-water energy reactor' (i.e. water-cooled water-moderated energy reactor). The design is a type of pressurised water reactor (PWR). The main distinguishing features of the VVER compared to other PWRs are:

- Horizontal steam generators
- Hexagonal fuel assemblies
- No bottom penetrations in the pressure vessel
- High-capacity pressurizers providing a large reactor coolant inventory

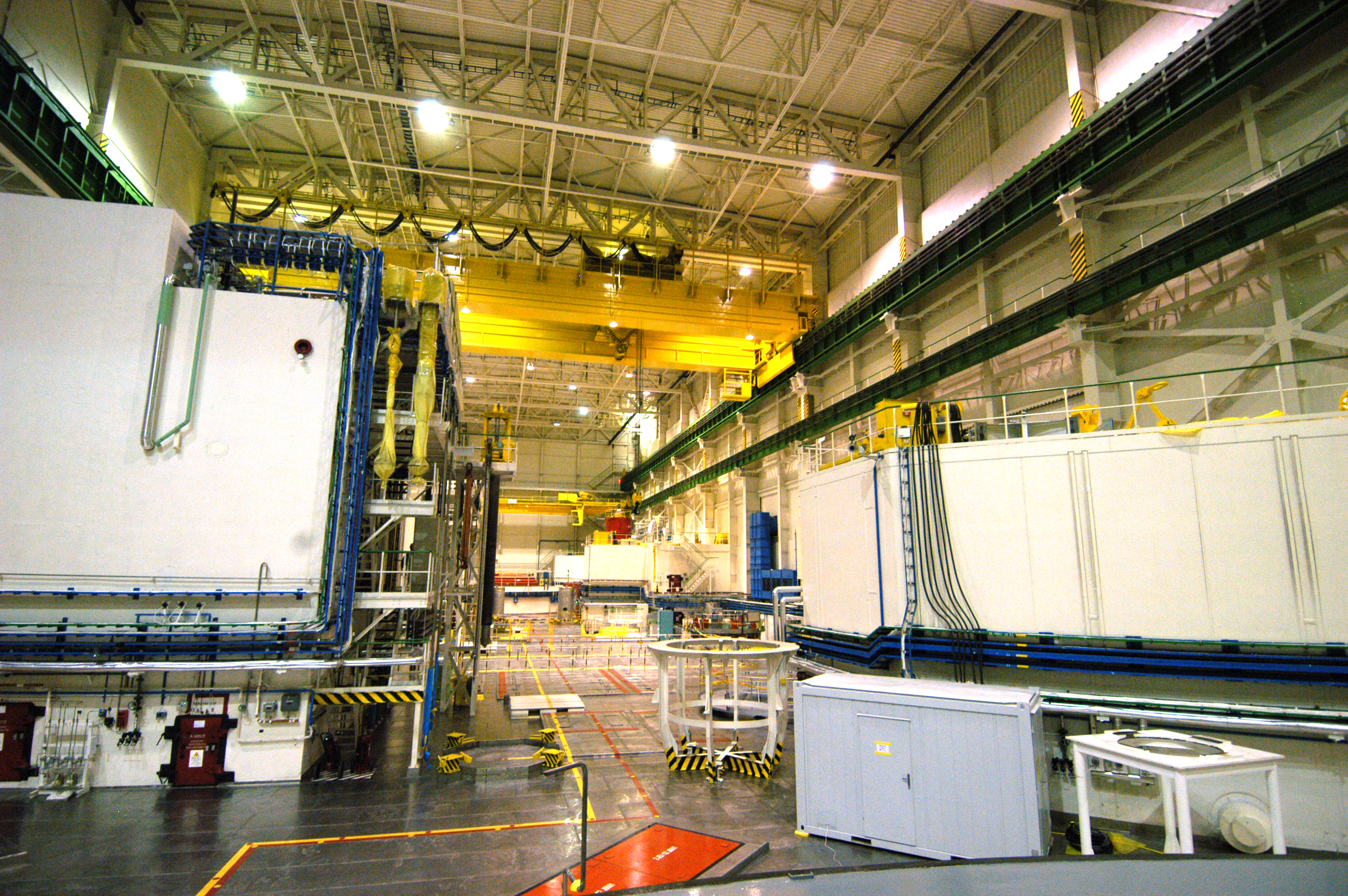
VVER-440 reactor hall at Mochovce Nuclear Power Plant

Reactor fuel rods are fully immersed in water kept at (12,5 / 15,7 / 16,2 ) MPa (1812/2277/2349 psi) pressure respectively so that it does not boil at the normal (220 to over 320 °C [428 to >608°F]) operating temperatures. Water in the reactor serves both as a coolant and a moderator which is an important safety feature. Should coolant circulation fail, the neutron moderation effect of the water diminishes due to increased heat which creates steam bubbles which do not moderate neutrons, thus reducing reaction intensity and compensating for loss of cooling, a condition known as negative void coefficient. Later versions of the reactors are encased in massive steel reactor pressure vessels. Fuel is low enriched (ca. 2.4–4.4% ^{235}U) uranium dioxide (UO_{2}) or equivalent pressed into pellets and assembled into fuel rods.

Reactivity is controlled by control rods that can be inserted into the reactor from above. These rods are made from a neutron absorbing material and, depending on depth of insertion, hinder the chain reaction. If there is an emergency, a reactor shutdown can be performed by full insertion of the control rods into the core.

=== Primary cooling circuits ===
Layout of the four primary cooling circuits and the pressurizer of a VVER-1000

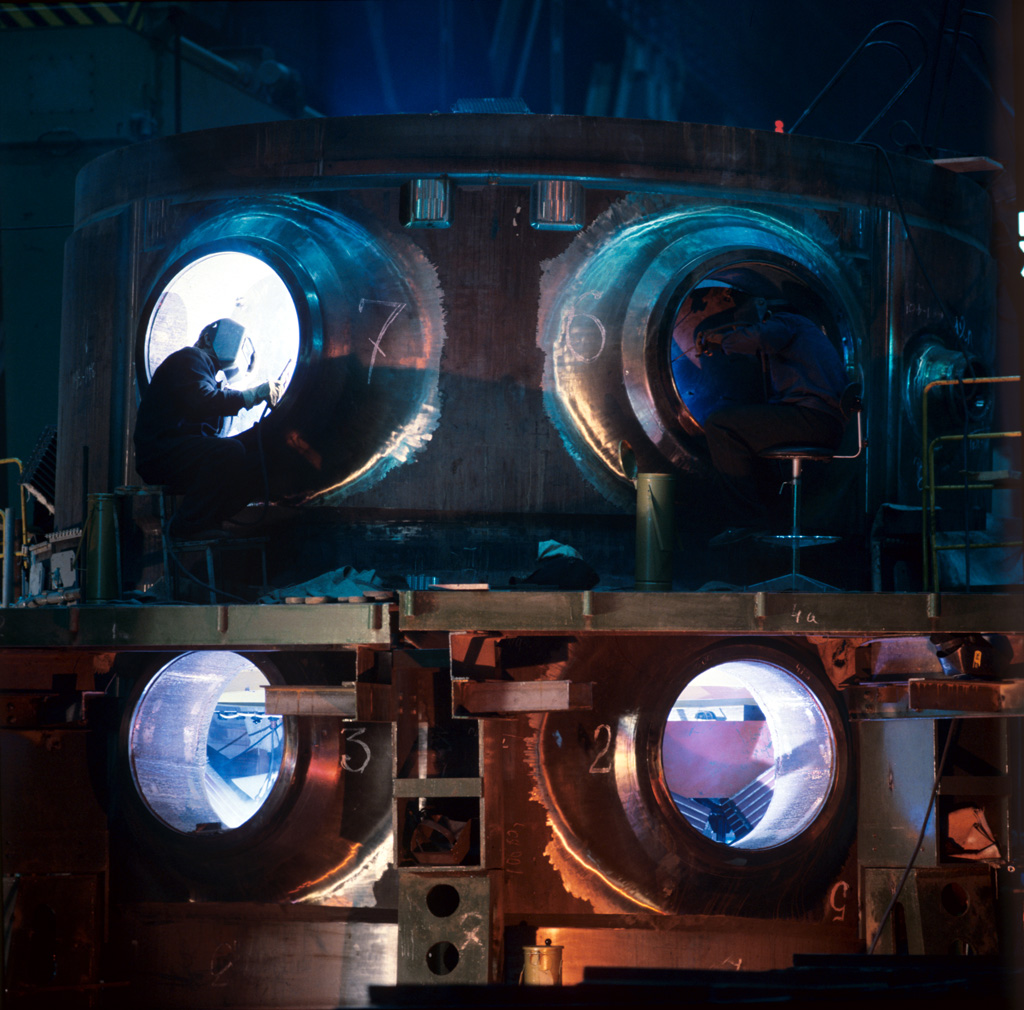
Construction of a VVER-1000 reactor vessel at Atommash

As stated above, the water in the primary circuits is kept under a constant elevated pressure to avoid its boiling. Since the water transfers all the heat from the core and is irradiated, the integrity of this circuit is crucial. Four main components can be distinguished:

1. Reactor vessel: water flows through the fuel assemblies which are heated by the nuclear chain reaction.
2. Volume compensator (pressurizer): to keep the water under constant but controlled pressure, the volume compensator regulates the pressure by controlling the equilibrium between saturated steam and water using electrical heating and relief valves.
3. Steam generator: in the steam generator, the heat from the primary coolant water is used to boil the water in the secondary circuit.
4. Pump: the pump ensures the proper circulation of the water through the circuit.

To provide for the continued cooling of the reactor core in emergency situations the primary cooling is designed with redundancy.

=== Secondary circuit and electrical output ===
The secondary circuit also consists of different subsystems:

1. Steam generator: secondary water is boiled taking heat from the primary circuit. Before entering the turbine remaining water is separated from the steam so that the steam is dry.
2. Turbine: the expanding steam drives a turbine, which connects to an electrical generator. The turbine is split into high and low pressure sections. To boost efficiency, steam is reheated between these sections. Reactors of the VVER-1000 type deliver 1 GW of electrical power.
3. Condenser: the steam is cooled and allowed to condense, shedding waste heat into a cooling circuit.
4. Deaerator: removes gases from the coolant.
5. Pump: the circulation pumps are each driven by their own small steam turbine.

To increase efficiency of the process, steam from the turbine is taken to reheat coolant in the secondary circuit before the deaerator and the steam generator. Water in this circuit is not supposed to be radioactive.

=== Tertiary cooling circuit and district heating ===
The tertiary cooling circuit is an open circuit diverting water from an outside reservoir such as a lake or river. Evaporative cooling towers, cooling basins or ponds transfer the waste heat from the generation circuit into the environment.

In most VVERs this heat can also be further used for residential and industrial heating. Operational examples of such systems are Bohunice NPP (Slovakia) supplying heat to the towns of Trnava (12 kilometres [7.5 mi] away), Leopoldov (9.5 kilometres [5.9 mi] away), and Hlohovec (13 kilometres [8.1 mi] away), and Temelín NPP (Czech Republic) supplying heat to Týn nad Vltavou 5 kilometres (3.1 mi) away and České Budějovice 26 kilometres (16 mi) away. Plans are made to supply heat from the Dukovany NPP to Brno (the second-largest city in the Czech Republic), covering two-thirds of its heat needs.

=== Safety barriers ===
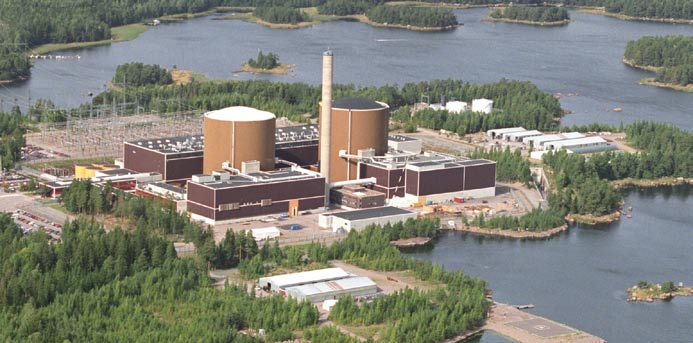
The two VVER-440 units in Loviisa, Finland have containment buildings that fulfil Western safety standards.

A typical design feature of nuclear reactors is layered safety barriers preventing escape of radioactive material. VVER reactors have three layers:

1. Fuel rods: the hermetic zirconium alloy (Zircaloy) cladding around the uranium oxide sintered ceramic fuel pellets provides a barrier resistant to heat and high pressure.
2. Reactor pressure vessel wall: a massive steel shell encases the whole fuel assembly and primary coolant hermetically.
3. Reactor building: a concrete containment building that encases the whole first circuit is strong enough to resist the pressure surge a breach in the first circuit would cause.

Compared to the RBMK reactors – the type involved in the Chernobyl disaster – the VVER uses an inherently safer design because the coolant is also the moderator, and by nature of its design has a negative void coefficient like all PWRs. It does not have the graphite-moderated RBMK's risk of increased reactivity and large power transients in the event of a loss of coolant accident. The RBMK reactors were also constructed without containment structures on grounds of cost due to their size; the VVER core is considerably smaller.

=== Fuel cycle extension ===
In 2024, Rosatom started testing fuel which contains a neutron absorber (erbium), and uranium enriched to 5% (instead of the typical 3%-4.95% range). The experiments have been carried out at the MIR.M1 research reactor at the Dimitrovgrad Research Institute of Nuclear Reactors. It will allow to extend the current fuel cycle from 12-18 months to 24 months.

=== Remix Fuel ===
The Balakovo Nuclear Power Plant is used for Remix Fuel experiments. In December 2024 the third final 18-month phase of the pilot program has started with the goal to achieve a closed nuclear cycle for VVER reactors. A mixture of enriched uranium with recycled uranium and plutonium received from the used nuclear fuel of other VVER reactors is used instead of a standard enriched uranium. After the first 2 stages of 3, fuel elements were inspected and were approved for the 3rd final stage. The 3rd stage concluded by the end of March 2026 when the fuel was unloaded, and after some time spent in the used fuel pool, it will be further studied in the Research Institute of Atomic Reactors (JSC SSC RIAR). Remix fuel has a lower plutonium content of up to 5% compared with MOX fuel.

== Versions ==
=== VVER-440 ===
One of the earliest versions of the VVER-type, the VVER-440, manifested certain problems with its containment building design. As the V-230 and older models were from the outset not built to resist a design-critical large pipe break, the manufacturer added, with the newer V-213 model, a so called Bubble condenser tower that – with its additional volume and a number of water layers – aims to suppress the forces of rapidly escaping steam without the onset of a containment-leak. As a consequence, all member-countries with plants of the VVER-440 V-230 type, as well as older types, were forced by the politicians of the European Union to shut them down permanently. Because of this, the Bohunice Nuclear Power Plant had to close two reactors and the Kozloduy Nuclear Power Plant had to close four. Whereas in the case of the Greifswald Nuclear Power Plant, the German regulatory body had already made the same decision in the wake of the fall of the Berlin Wall.

=== VVER-1000 ===
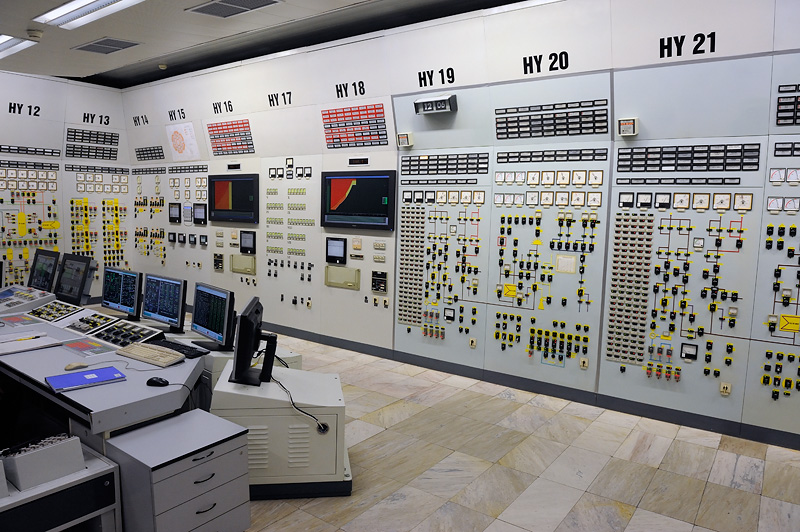
Control room of a VVER-1000 in 2009, Kozloduy Unit 5

When first built, the VVER design was intended to be operational for 35 years. A mid-life major overhaul including a complete replacement of critical parts such as fuel and control rod channels was thought necessary after that. Since RBMK reactors specified a major replacement programme at 35 years designers originally decided this needed to happen in the VVER type as well, although they are of more robust design than the RBMK type. Most of Russia's VVER plants are now reaching and passing the 35 year mark. More recent design studies have allowed for an extension of lifetime up to 50 years with replacement of equipment. New VVERs will be nameplated with the extended lifetime.

In 2010 the oldest VVER-1000, at Novovoronezh, was shut down for modernization to extend its operating life for an additional 20 years; the first to undergo such an operating life extension. The work includes the modernization of management, protection and emergency systems, and improvement of security and radiation safety systems.

In 2018 Rosatom announced it had developed a thermal annealing technique for reactor pressure vessels which ameliorates radiation damage and extends service life by between 15 and 30 years. This had been demonstrated on unit 1 of the Balakovo Nuclear Power Plant.

=== VVER-1200 ===
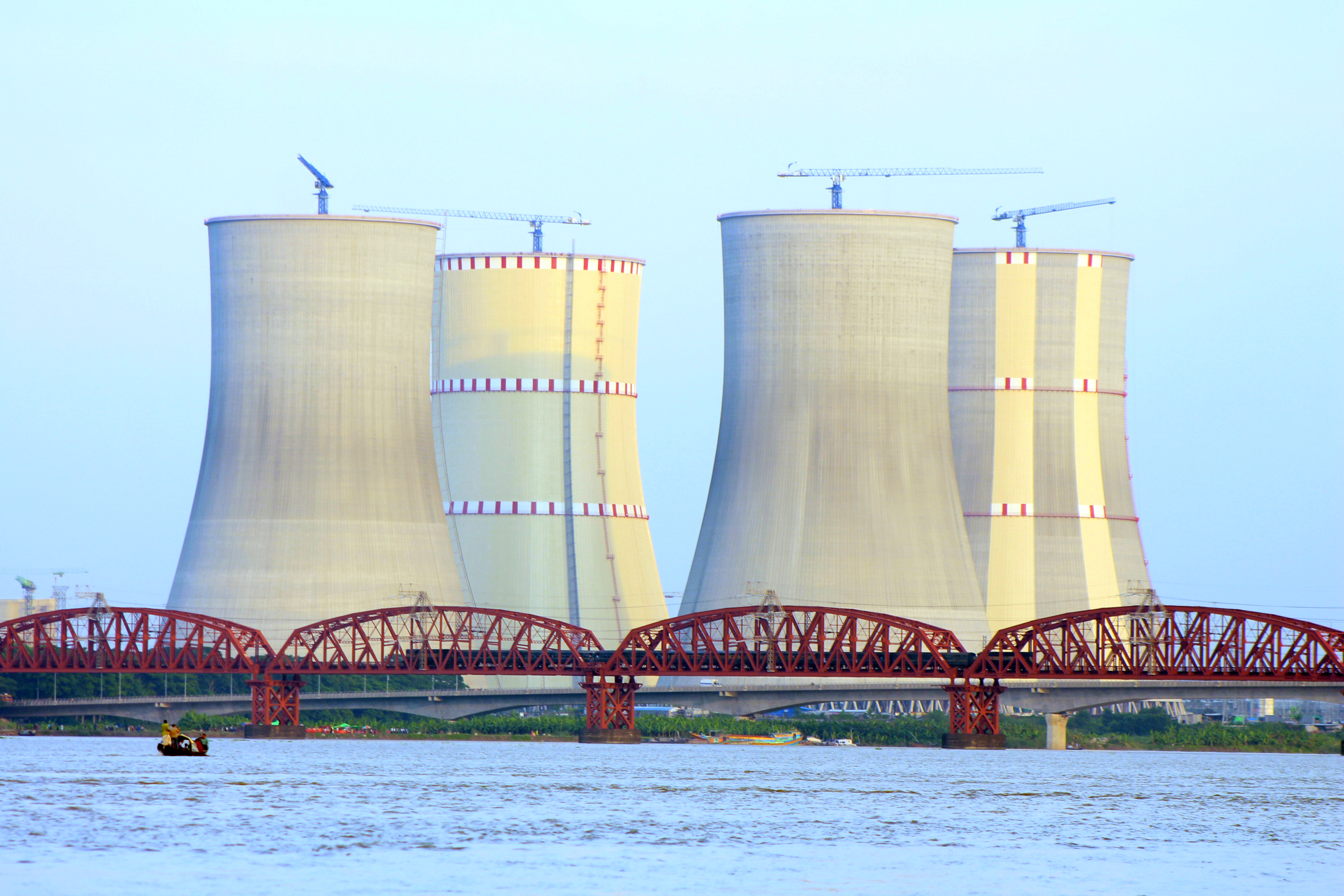
Wide angle view of Rooppur Nuclear Power Plant in Bangladesh that consists of two 1200 MWe VVER-1200 reactors

The VVER-1200 (or NPP-2006 or AES-2006) is an evolution of the VVER-1000 being offered for domestic and export use. The reactor design has been refined to optimize fuel efficiency. Specifications include a $1,200 per kW overnight construction cost, requiring about 35% fewer operational personnel than the VVER-1000. The VVER-1200 has a gross and net thermal efficiency of 37.5% and 34.8%. The VVER 1200 will produce 1,198 MWe of power.

VVER-1200 has a 60 years design lifetime with the possibility of extension by 20 years.

The first two units have been built at Leningrad Nuclear Power Plant II and Novovoronezh Nuclear Power Plant II. More reactors with a VVER-1200/491 like the Leningrad-II-design are planned (Kaliningrad and Nizhny Novgorod NPP) and under construction. The type VVER-1200/392M as installed at the Novovoronezh NPP-II has also been selected for the Seversk, Zentral and South-Urals NPP. A standard version was developed as VVER-1200/513 and based on the VVER-TOI (VVER-1300/510) design.

In July 2012, the construction of two AES-2006 reactors at the Ostrovets NPP in Belarus was agreed upon. The total cost was said to be $10 billion. An AES-2006 was discussed for the Hanhikivi Nuclear Power Plant in Finland in 2014. The plant supply contract was signed in 2013, but terminated in 2022 mainly due to the Russian invasion of Ukraine.

From 2015 to 2017, Egypt and Russia came to an agreement for the construction of four VVER-1200 units at the El Dabaa Nuclear Power Plant.

On 30 November 2017, concrete was poured for the nuclear island basemat for the first of two VVER-1200/523 units at the Rooppur Nuclear Power Plant in Bangladesh. The power plant will be a 2.4 GWe plant. The two units were planned to be operational in 2023 and 2024.

On 7 March 2019 China National Nuclear Corporation and Atomstroyexport signed the detailed contract for the construction of four VVER-1200s, two each at the Tianwan Nuclear Power Plant and the Xudabao Nuclear Power Plant. Construction will start in May 2021 and commercial operation of all the units is expected between 2026 and 2028.

From 2020 an 18-month refuelling cycle will be piloted, resulting in an improved capacity utilisation factor compared to the previous 12-month cycle. The VVER-1200 is designed to be capable of varying power between 100% and 40% for daily load following, which was tested in 2024.

==== Safety features ====
The nuclear part of the plant is housed in a single building acting as containment and missile shield. Besides the reactor and steam generators this includes an improved refueling machine, and the computerized reactor control systems. Likewise protected in the same building are the emergency systems, including an emergency core cooling system, emergency backup diesel power supply, and backup feed water supply,

A passive heat removal system had been added to the existing active systems in the AES-92 version of the VVER-1000 used for the Kudankulam Nuclear Power Plant in India. This has been retained for the newer VVER-1200 and future designs. The system is based on a cooling system and water tanks built on top of the containment dome. The passive systems handle all safety functions for 24 hours, and core safety for 72 hours.

Other new safety systems include aircraft crash protection, hydrogen recombiners, and a core catcher to contain the molten reactor core in the event of a severe accident. The core catcher will be deployed in the Rooppur Nuclear Power Plant and El Dabaa Nuclear Power Plant.

The ones on Akkuyu Nuclear Plant are based on AES-2006 with updated seismic and regulatory conditions from VVER-TOI to satisfy both Turkey's geographical conditions and post-Fukushima measures.

=== VVER-TOI ===
The VVER-TOI (Russian: ВВЭР-ТОИ; Russian: типовой оптимизированный и информатизированный, romanized: tipovoy optimizirovannyy i informatizirovannyy, lit. 'standard optimized and computerized', universal optimized digital) is developed from the VVER-1200. It is aimed at development of typical optimized informative-advanced project of a new generation III+ Power Unit based on VVER technology, which meets a number of target-oriented parameters using modern information and management technologies.

The main improvements from the VVER-1200 are:

- power increased to 1300 MWe gross
- upgraded pressure vessel
- improved core design to improve cooling
- further developments of passive safety systems
- lower construction and operating costs with a 40-month construction time
- use of low-speed turbines
- up to 100 years service life (60 years design lifetime with 40 years of extension)

In June 2019 the VVER-TOI was certified as compliant with European Utility Requirements (with certain reservations) for nuclear power plants.

The construction of the first two VVER-TOI units has started in 2018 and 2019 at the Kursk II Nuclear Power Plant. The first VVER-TOI was connected to the grid in December 2025. Kursk II-1 has entered commercial operation on May 1st 2026.

=== VVER-S-600 ===
The medium-powered VVER-S-600 is an under-development VVER technology that aims to facilitate the closure of the fuel cycle by utilizing a full load of MOX fuel. Rosatom claims that this could reduce the consumption of natural uranium by 50%. The letter 'S' in the name represents spectral shift control.

In contrast to conventional VVER technology, which utilizes a boron system for initial reactivity control for burnup and absorption, the VVER-S reactor manages control by adjusting the moderator-to-fuel ratio during operation, without relying on boron. This is accomplished by taking out the water displacer rods found in designated fuel assembly channels within the core. These displacers are introduced into the core at the start of the fuel cycle to lower the moderator-to-fuel ratio, thereby hardening the neutron spectrum, which enhances neutron capture in U-238 and leads to the production of Pu-239. However, these displacer rods removed at the end of cycle, which softens the neutron spectrum, resulting in an increase in reactivity.

The VVER-S-600 is to have a design life of 80 years. The estimated breeding ratio of the VVER-S-600 is 0.7 to 0.8, compared to 0.35 to 0.4 of the conventional VVERs. It is expected to have a cycle length of at least 24 months using MOX fuel.

== Power plants ==
List of operational, planned, and closed VVER installations
Power plant			Reactors			Status	Notes	Ref
Unit	Country	Geolocation	Model	Ver	Gen	Status	Notes	Ref
Akkuyu-1	Turkey	36°08′40″N 33°32′28″E	VVER-1200	V-509	III+	Startup Testing		
Akkuyu-2	Turkey	36°08′40″N 33°32′28″E	VVER-1200	V-509	III+	Under construction		
Akkuyu-3	Turkey	36°08′40″N 33°32′28″E	VVER-1200	V-509	III+	Under construction		
Akkuyu-4	Turkey	36°08′40″N 33°32′28″E	VVER-1200	V-509	III+	Under construction		
Astravets-1	Belarus	54°45′40″N 26°5′21″E	VVER-1200	V-491 (AES-2006)	III+	Operational	Unit 1 operational since 2020.	
Astravets-2	Belarus	54°45′40″N 26°5′21″E	VVER-1200	V-491 (AES-2006)	III+	Operational	Unit 2 started operating in May 2023.	
Balakovo-1	Russia	52°5′28″N 47°57′19″E	VVER-1000	V-320	III	Operational		
Balakovo-2	Russia	52°5′28″N 47°57′19″E	VVER-1000	V-320	III	Operational		
Balakovo-3	Russia	52°5′28″N 47°57′19″E	VVER-1000	V-320	III	Operational		
Balakovo-4	Russia	52°5′28″N 47°57′19″E	VVER-1000	V-320	III	Operational		
Balakovo-5	Russia	52°5′28″N 47°57′19″E	VVER-1000	V-320	III	Cancelled	construction cancelled. To be dismantled.	
Balakovo-6	Russia	52°5′28″N 47°57′19″E	VVER-1000	V-320	III	Cancelled	construction cancelled. To be dismantled.	
Bashkir-1	Russia		VVER-1000	V-510		Cancelled		
Bashkir-2	Russia		VVER-1000	V-510		Cancelled		
Bashkir-3	Russia		VVER-1000			Cancelled		
Bashkir-4	Russia		VVER-1000			Cancelled		
Belene-1	Bulgaria	43°37′46″N 25°11′12″E	VVER-1000	V-466B		Cancelled	Suspended in 2012.	
Belene-2	Bulgaria	43°37′46″N 25°11′12″E	VVER-1000	V-466B		Cancelled	Suspended in 2012.	
Bohunice-V1-1	Slovakia	48°29′40″N 17°40′55″E	VVER-440	V-230	II	Permanent Shutdown	Closed in 2006	
Bohunice-V1-2	Slovakia	48°29′40″N 17°40′55″E	VVER-440	V-230	II	Permanent Shutdown	Closed in 2008	
Bohunice-V2-1	Slovakia	48°29′40″N 17°40′55″E	VVER-440	V-213	II	Operational		
Bohunice-V2-2	Slovakia	48°29′40″N 17°40′55″E	VVER-440	V-213	II	Operational		
Bushehr-1	Iran	28°49′46.64″N 50°53′09.46″E	VVER-1000	V-446	III	Operational	Unit 1 operational since 2011.	
Bushehr-2	Iran	28°49′46.64″N 50°53′09.46″E	VVER-1000	V-528 (AES-92)	III+	Under construction (Frozen)		
Bushehr-3	Iran	28°49′46.64″N 50°53′09.46″E	VVER-1000	V-528 (AES-92)	III+	Planned	being prepared	
Crimean-1	Crimea		VVER-1000	V-320	III	Cancelled		
Crimean-2	Crimea		VVER-1000	V-320	III	Cancelled		
Crimean-3	Crimea		VVER-1000	V-320	III	Cancelled		
Crimean-4	Crimea		VVER-1000	V-320	III	Cancelled		
Dukovany-1	Czech Republic		VVER-440	V-213	II	Operational	Upgraded to 510 MW in 2009-2012. Upgrade to 522 MW planned.	
Dukovany-2	Czech Republic		VVER-440	V-213	II	Operational	Upgraded to 510 MW in 2009-2012. Upgrade to 522 MW planned.	
Dukovany-3	Czech Republic		VVER-440	V-213	II	Operational	Upgraded to 510 MW in 2009-2012. Upgrade to 522 MW planned.	
Dukovany-4	Czech Republic		VVER-440	V-213	II	Operational	Upgraded to 510 MW in 2009-2012. Upgrade to 522 MW planned.	
El Dabaa-1	Egypt	31°2′39″N 28°29′52″E	VVER-1200	V-529	III+	Under construction		
El Dabaa-2	Egypt	31°2′39″N 28°29′52″E	VVER-1200	V-529	III+	Under construction		
El Dabaa-3	Egypt	31°2′39″N 28°29′52″E	VVER-1200	V-529	III+	Under construction		
El Dabaa-4	Egypt	31°2′39″N 28°29′52″E	VVER-1200	V-529	III+	Under construction		
Greifswald-1	Germany		VVER-440	V-230	II	Decommissioned		
Greifswald-2	Germany		VVER-440	V-230	II	Decommissioned		
Greifswald-3	Germany		VVER-440	V-230	II	Decommissioned		
Greifswald-4	Germany		VVER-440	V-230	II	Decommissioned		
Greifswald-5	Germany		VVER-440	V-213	II	Decommissioned		
Greifswald-6	Germany		VVER-440	V-213	II	Built	Unit 6 finished, but never operated.	
Greifswald-7	Germany		VVER-440	V-213	II	Cancelled		
Greifswald-8	Germany		VVER-440	V-213	II	Cancelled		
Jizzakh-3	Uzbekistan		VVER-1000			Planned	Agreement signed.	
Jizzakh-4	Uzbekistan		VVER-1000			Planned	Agreement signed.	
Juragua-1	Cuba		VVER-440	V-318	II	Cancelled		
Juragua-2	Cuba		VVER-440	V-318	II	Cancelled		
Kalinin-1	Russia		VVER-1000	V-338	III	Operational		
Kalinin-2	Russia		VVER-1000	V-338	III	Operational		
Kalinin-3	Russia		VVER-1000	V-320	III	Operational	construction slow down in 1990, restarted construction in early 1990s, commissioned in 2004	
Kalinin-4	Russia		VVER-1000	V-320	III	Operational	suspended in 1991, restarted and commissioned in 2012	
Kaliningrad-1	Russia		VVER-1200	V-491	III+	Construction suspended		
Kaliningrad-2	Russia		VVER-1200	V-491	III+	Construction suspended		
Khmelnytskyi-1	Ukraine		VVER-1000	V-320	III	Operational		
Khmelnytskyi-2	Ukraine		VVER-1000	V-320	III	Operational		
Khmelnytskyi-3	Ukraine		VVER-1000	V-392B	III	Under construction	Unit 3 planned to be completed with Czech company Škoda JS as VVER-1000 and units 5 and 6 contract signed - Westinghouse AP1000	
Khmelnytskyi-4	Ukraine		VVER-1000	V-392B	III	Cancelled	Cancelled in 2021	
Kola-1	Russia		VVER-440	V-230	II	Operational	prolonged to 60-year operation lifespan	
Kola-2	Russia		VVER-440	V-230	II	Operational	prolonged to 60-year operation lifespan	
Kola-3	Russia		VVER-440	V-213	II	Operational	prolonged to 60-year operation lifespan	
Kola-4	Russia		VVER-440	V-213	II	Operational	prolonged to 60-year operation lifespan	
Kola II-1	Russia		VVER-S			Planned	Four 600 MW units are planned with a service life of 80 years, construction is expected to happen during 2027-2037	
Kola II-2	Russia		VVER-S			Planned		
Kola II-3	Russia		VVER-S			Planned		
Kola II-4	Russia		VVER-S			Planned		
Kostroma-1	Russia		VVER-1200			Cancelled		
Kostroma-2	Russia		VVER-1200			Cancelled		
Kostroma-3	Russia		VVER-1200			Cancelled		
Kostroma-4	Russia		VVER-1200			Cancelled		
Kudankulam-1	India	8°10′08″N 77°42′45″E	VVER-1000	V-412 (AES-92)	III	Operational	Operational since 13 July 2013	
Kudankulam-2	India	8°10′08″N 77°42′45″E	VVER-1000	V-412 (AES-92)	III	Operational	Operational since 10 July 2016	
Kudankulam-3	India	8°10′08″N 77°42′45″E	VVER-1000	V-412 (AES-92)	III	Under construction		
Kudankulam-4	India	8°10′08″N 77°42′45″E	VVER-1000	V-412 (AES-92)	III	Under construction		
Kudankulam-5	India	8°10′08″N 77°42′45″E	VVER-1000	V-412 (AES-92)	III	Under construction		
Kudankulam-6	India	8°10′08″N 77°42′45″E	VVER-1000	V-412 (AES-92)	III	Under construction		
Kozloduy-1	Bulgaria		VVER-440	V-230	II	Permanent Shutdown	Shutdown in 2002	
Kozloduy-2	Bulgaria		VVER-440	V-230	II	Permanent Shutdown	Shutdown in 2002	
Kozloduy-3	Bulgaria		VVER-440	V-230	II	Permanent Shutdown	Shutdown in 2006	
Kozloduy-4	Bulgaria		VVER-440	V-230	II	Permanent Shutdown	Shutdown in 2006	
Kozloduy-5	Bulgaria		VVER-1000	V-320	III	Operational	Uprated to 1040 MW	
Kozloduy-6	Bulgaria		VVER-1000	V-320	III	Operational	Uprated to 1040 MW	
Kursk II-1	Russia	51°41′18″N 35°34′24″E	VVER-TOI VVER-1300	V-510K	III+	Operational		
Kursk II-2	Russia	51°41′18″N 35°34′24″E	VVER-TOI VVER-1300	V-510K	III+	Under construction		
Kursk II-3	Russia	51°41′18″N 35°34′24″E	VVER-TOI VVER-1300	V-510K	III+	Under construction	Pouring of the concrete for the foundation of the 3rd unit has started in May 2026, the goal is for all 4 units to be in operation by 2034.	
Kursk II-4	Russia	51°41′18″N 35°34′24″E	VVER-TOI VVER-1300	V-510K	III+	Under construction		
Leningrad II-1	Russia	59°49′52″N 29°03′35″E	VVER-1200	V-491 (AES-2006)	III+	Operational	Prototype. In commercial operation since October 2018.	
Leningrad II-2	Russia	59°49′52″N 29°03′35″E	VVER-1200	V-491 (AES-2006)	III+	Operational	Prototype. In commercial operation since March 2021.	
Leningrad II-3	Russia	59°49′52″N 29°03′35″E	VVER-1200	V-491 (AES-2006)	III+	Under construction		
Leningrad II-4	Russia	59°49′52″N 29°03′35″E	VVER-1200	V-491 (AES-2006)	III+	Under construction		
Loviisa-1	Finland		VVER-440	V-213	II	Operational	Western control systems, clearly different containment structures. Later modified for a 530 MW output.	
Loviisa-2	Finland		VVER-440	V-213	II	Operational	Western control systems, clearly different containment structures. Later modified for a 530 MW output.	
Metsamor-1	Armenia		VVER-440	V-270	II	Permanent Shutdown	Shutdown in 1989.	
Metsamor-2	Armenia		VVER-440	V-270	II	Operational	Decommissioning planned in 2036	
Mochovce-1	Slovakia		VVER-440	V-213	II	Operational		
Mochovce-2	Slovakia		VVER-440	V-213	II	Operational		
Mochovce-3	Slovakia		VVER-440	V-213+	II	Operational	Commissioned in 2023	
Mochovce-4	Slovakia		VVER-440	V-213+	II	Under construction	Under construction since 1985, to be commissioned in 2026.	
Ninh Thuan 1-1	Vietnam		VVER-1200	V-491 (AES-2006)	III+	Planned	The agreement to build 2 VVER-1200 with the new Leningrad units as the reference project was signed on 23rd March 2026	
Ninh Thuan 1-2	Vietnam		VVER-1200	V-491 (AES-2006)	III+	Planned		
Novovoronezh-1	Russia		VVER	V-210 (V-1)	I	Decommissioned	Prototype	
Novovoronezh-2	Russia		VVER	V-365 (V-3M)	I	Decommissioned	Prototype	
Novovoronezh-3	Russia		VVER-440	V-179	II	Decommissioned	Prototype. Unit 3 modernised in 2002.	
Novovoronezh-4	Russia		VVER-440	V-179	II	Operational		
Novovoronezh-5	Russia		VVER-1000	V-187	II	Operational	Prototype.	
Novovoronezh II-1	Russia	51°15′53.964″N 39°12′41.22″E	VVER-1200	V-392M (AES-2006)	III+	Operational	Prototype. Commissioned in 2017.	
Novovoronezh II-2	Russia	51°15′53.964″N 39°12′41.22″E	VVER-1200	V-392M (AES-2006)	III+	Operational	Commissioned in 2019.	
Paks-1	Hungary		VVER-440	V-213	II	Operational		
Paks-2	Hungary		VVER-440	V-213	II	Operational		
Paks-3	Hungary		VVER-440	V-213	II	Operational		
Paks-4	Hungary		VVER-440	V-213	II	Operational		
Paks-5	Hungary		VVER-1200	V-517	III+	Under construction		
Paks-6	Hungary		VVER-1200	V-517	III+	Under construction		
Rheinsberg	Germany		VVER	VVER-70 (V-2)	I	Decommissioned	Unit decommissioned in 1990	
Rivne-1	Ukraine		VVER-440	V-213	II	Operational		
Rivne-2	Ukraine		VVER-440	V-213	II	Operational		
Rivne-3	Ukraine		VVER-1000	V-320	III	Operational		
Rivne-4	Ukraine		VVER-1000	V-320	III	Operational	Unit 4 suspended in 1990, restarted in 1993 with a very slow progress.	
Rivne-5	Ukraine		VVER-1000	V-320	III	Planning Suspended	Planning suspended in 1990.	
Rivne-6	Ukraine		VVER-1000	V-320	III	Planning Suspended	Planning suspended in 1990.	
Rooppur-1	Bangladesh	24°6′47″N 89°4′07″E	VVER-1200	V-523	III+	Under construction		
Rooppur-2	Bangladesh	24°6′47″N 89°4′07″E	VVER-1200	V-523	III+	Under construction		
Rostov-1	Russia	47°35′57.63″N 42°22′18.76″E	VVER-1000	V-320	III	Operational	Plant construction suspended in 1990 - unit 1 was nearly 100% completed. Construction restarted in 1999-2000. Commissioned in 2001	
Rostov-2	Russia	47°35′57.63″N 42°22′18.76″E	VVER-1000	V-320	III	Operational	Plant construction suspended in 1990. Construction restarted in 1999-2000.	
Rostov-3	Russia	47°35′57.63″N 42°22′18.76″E	VVER-1000	V-320	III	Operational	Plant construction suspended in 1990. Construction restarted in 1999-2000.	
Rostov-4	Russia	47°35′57.63″N 42°22′18.76″E	VVER-1000	V-320	III	Operational	Plant construction suspended in 1990. Construction restarted in 1999-2000. Commissioned in 2018	
Smolensk II-1	Russia		VVER-1200	V-491 (AES-2006)	III+	Planned	Preparation for construction	
Smolensk II-2	Russia		VVER-1200	V-491 (AES-2006)	III+	Planned		
South Ukraine-1	Ukraine		VVER-1000	V-302	III	Operational		
South Ukraine-2	Ukraine		VVER-1000	V-338	III	Operational		
South Ukraine-3	Ukraine		VVER-1000	V-320	III	Operational		
South Ukraine-4	Ukraine		VVER-1000	V-320	III	Cancelled	Construction suspended in 1989 and cancelled in 1991.	
Stendal-1	Germany		VVER-1000	V-320	III	Cancelled	Cancelled in 1991 after German reunification	
Stendal-2	Germany		VVER-1000	V-320	III	Cancelled	Cancelled in 1991 after German reunification	
Stendal-3	Germany		VVER-1000	V-320	III	Cancelled	Cancelled in 1991 after German reunification	
Stendal-4	Germany		VVER-1000	V-320	III	Cancelled	Cancelled in 1991 after German reunification	
Tatar-1	Russia		VVER-TOI			Cancelled		
Tatar-2	Russia		VVER-TOI			Cancelled		
Temelin-1	Czech Republic		VVER-1000	V-320	III	Operational	Western control systems. Both units upgraded to 1086 MWe and commissioned in 2000	
Temelin-2	Czech Republic		VVER-1000	V-320	III	Operational	Western control systems. Both units upgraded to 1086 MWe and commissioned in 2002	
Temelin-3	Czech Republic		VVER-1000	V-320	III	Cancelled	cancelled in 1990 due to change of political regime, only foundation was completed. planned with KHNP's APR1000.	
Temelin-4	Czech Republic		VVER-1000	V-320	III	Cancelled	cancelled in 1990 due to change of political regime, only foundation was completed. planned with KHNP's APR1000.	
Tianwan-1	China	34°41′13″N 119°27′35″E	VVER-1000	V-428 (AES-91)	III	Operational		
Tianwan-2	China	34°41′13″N 119°27′35″E	VVER-1000	V-428 (AES-91)	III	Operational		
Tianwan-3	China	34°41′13″N 119°27′35″E	VVER-1000	V-428M (AES-91)	III	Operational		
Tianwan-4	China	34°41′13″N 119°27′35″E	VVER-1000	V-428M (AES-91)	III	Operational		
Tianwan-7	China	34°41′13″N 119°27′35″E	VVER-1200	V-491	III+	Under construction	The unit was connected to the grid in October 2026	
Tianwan-8	China	34°41′13″N 119°27′35″E	VVER-1200	V-491	III+	Under construction	VVER-1200 construction started in February 2022.	
Xudabao-3	China	40°21′5″N 120°32′45″E	VVER-1200	V-491	III+	Under construction	Construction on the first reactor commenced on 28 July 2021	
Xudabao-4	China	40°21′5″N 120°32′45″E	VVER-1200	V-491	III+	Under construction	Construction starting on 19 May 2022.	
Zaporizhzhia-1	Ukraine	47°30′30″N 34°35′04″E	VVER-1000	V-320	III	Operational		
Zaporizhzhia-2	Ukraine	47°30′30″N 34°35′04″E	VVER-1000	V-320	III	Operational		
Zaporizhzhia-3	Ukraine	47°30′30″N 34°35′04″E	VVER-1000	V-320	III	Operational		
Zaporizhzhia-4	Ukraine	47°30′30″N 34°35′04″E	VVER-1000	V-320	III	Operational		
Zaporizhzhia-5	Ukraine	47°30′30″N 34°35′04″E	VVER-1000	V-320	III	Operational		
Zaporizhzhia-6	Ukraine	47°30′30″N 34°35′04″E	VVER-1000	V-320	III	Operational	Commissioned in 1996.	
Zhambyl-1	Kazakhstan		VVER-1200		III+	Planned	VVER-1200 was selected to be built in Kazakhstan, the first large (more than 1GW) nuclear power plant in Kazakhstan (previous unit in operation was BN-350)	
Zhambyl-2	Kazakhstan		VVER-1200		III+	Planned		

== Technical specifications ==
Specifications	VVER-210	VVER-365	VVER-440	VVER-1000	VVER-1200 (V-392M)	VVER-TOI VVER-1300
References						
Thermal output, MW	760	1325	1375	3000	3212	3300
Efficiency, net %	25.5	25.7	29.7	31.7	35.7 (Note: Other sources - 34,8.)	37.9
Vapor pressure, in 100 kPa						
in front of the turbine	29.0	29.0	44.0	60.0	70.0	
in the first circuit	100	105	125	160.0	165.1	165.2
Water temperature, °C:						
core coolant inlet	250	250	269	289	298.2	297.2
core coolant outlet	269	275	300	319	328.6	328.8
Equivalent core diameter, m	2.88	2.88	2.88	3.12	—	
Active core height, m	2.50	2.50	2.50	3.50	—	3.73
Outer diameter of fuel rods, mm	10.2	9.1	9.1	9.1	9.1	9.1
Number of fuel rods in assembly	90	126	126	312	312	313
Number of fuel assemblies	349 (312+ARK (SUZ) 37)	349 (276+ARK 73)	349 (276+ARK 73), (312+ARK 37) Kola	151 (109+SUZ 42), 163	163	163
Uranium loading, tons	38	40	42	66	76-85.5	87.3
Average uranium enrichment, %	2.0	3.0	3.5	4.26	4.69	
Average fuel burnup, MW · day / kg	13.0	27.0	28.6	48.4	55.5	

== Classification ==
VVER models and installations
Generation	Name	Model	Country	Power plants
I	VVER	V-210 (V-1)	Russia	Novovoronezh 1 (decommissioned)
I	VVER	V-70 (V-2)	East Germany	Rheinsberg (KKR) (decommissioned)
I	VVER	V-365 (V-3M)	Russia	Novovoronezh 2 (decommissioned)
II	VVER-440	V-179	Russia	Novovoronezh 3 (decommissioned) - 4
II	VVER-440	V-230	Russia	Kola 1-2
II	VVER-440	V-230	East Germany	Greifswald 1-4 (decommissioned)
II	VVER-440	V-230	Bulgaria	Kozloduy 1-4 (decommissioned)
II	VVER-440	V-230	Slovakia	Bohunice I 1-2 (decommissioned)
II	VVER-440	V-213	Russia	Kola 3-4
II	VVER-440	V-213	East Germany	Greifswald 5 (decommissioned)
II	VVER-440	V-213	Ukraine	Rivne 1-2
II	VVER-440	V-213	Hungary	Paks 1-4
II	VVER-440	V-213	Czech Republic	Dukovany 1-4
II	VVER-440	V-213	Finland	Loviisa 1-2
II	VVER-440	V-213	Slovakia	Bohunice II 1-2; Mochovce 1-2
II	VVER-440	V-213+	Slovakia	Mochovce 3 Mochovce 4 (under construction)
II	VVER-440	V-270	Armenia	Armenian-1 (decommissioned); Armenian-2
III	VVER-1000	V-187	Russia	Novovoronezh 5
III	VVER-1000	V-302	Ukraine	South Ukraine 1
III	VVER-1000	V-338	Ukraine	South Ukraine 2
III	VVER-1000	V-338	Russia	Kalinin 1-2
III	VVER-1000	V-320	Russia	Balakovo 1-4; Kalinin 3-4; Rostov 1-4
III	VVER-1000	V-320	Ukraine	Rivne 3-4; Zaporizhzhia 1-6; Khmelnytskyi 1-2; South Ukraine 3
III	VVER-1000	V-320	Bulgaria	Kozloduy 5-6
III	VVER-1000	V-320	Czech Republic	Temelin 1-2
III	VVER-1000	V-428	China	Tianwan 1-2
III	VVER-1000	V-428M	China	Tianwan 3-4
III	VVER-1000	V-412	India	Kudankulam 1-2; Kudankulam 3-6 (under construction)
III	VVER-1000	V-446	Iran	Bushehr 1
III+	VVER-1000	V-528	Iran	Bushehr 2 (construction frozen)
III+	VVER-1200	V-392M	Russia	Novovoronezh II 1-2
III+	VVER-1200	V-491	Russia	Baltic 1-2 (construction frozen); Leningrad II 1-2; Leningrad II 3-4 (under construction)
III+	VVER-1200	V-491	Belarus	Belarus 1-2
III+	VVER-1200	V-491	China	Tianwan 7-8 (under construction); Xudabao 3-4 (under construction)
III+	VVER-1200	V-509	Turkey	Akkuyu 1-4 (under construction)
III+	VVER-1200	V-523	Bangladesh	Rooppur 1-2 (under construction)
III+	VVER-1200	V-529	Egypt	El Dabaa 1-4 (under construction)
III+	VVER-1200	V-529	Hungary	Paks II 1 (under construction)
III+	VVER-1300	V-510K	Russia	Kursk II 1 Kursk II 2-3 (under construction)

== See also ==
- Nuclear power in Russia
- Russian floating nuclear power station
- VBER-300
