= Novovoronezh =

Town in Voronezh Oblast, Russia

Novovoronezh Нововоронеж
- Town
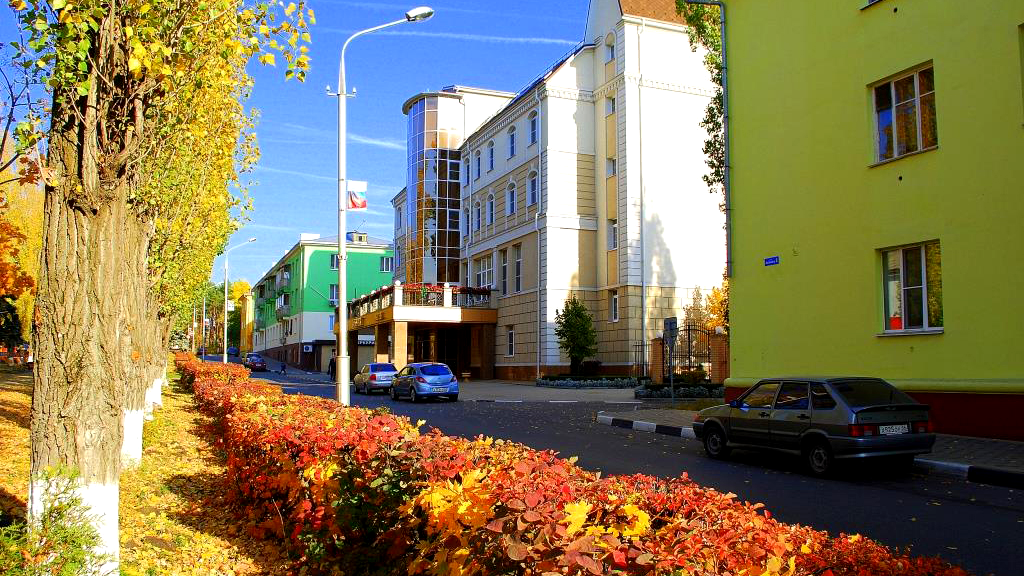
- Novovoronezh

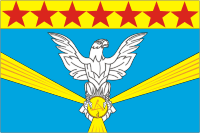
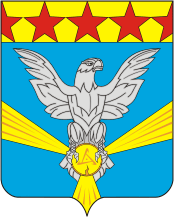
- Flag Coat of arms
- Interactive map of Novovoronezh
- Location of Novovoronezh Novovoronezh (Voronezh Oblast)
- Coordinates: 51°19′N 39°13′E
- Country: Russia
- Federal subject: Voronezh Oblast
- Founded: 1957
- Town status since: 1987

Area
  - Total: 46.13 km^{2} (17.81 sq mi)
- Elevation: 110 m (360 ft)

Population (2010 Census)
  - Total: 32,635
  - Estimate (2025): 30,434 (−6.7%)
  - Density: 707.5/km^{2} (1,832/sq mi)

Administrative status
  - Subordinated to: Novovoronezh Urban Okrug
  - Capital of: Novovoronezh Urban Okrug

Municipal status
  - Urban okrug: Novovoronezh Urban Okrug
  - Capital of: Novovoronezh Urban Okrug
- Time zone: UTC+3 (MSK)
- Postal codes: 396070, 396071
- Dialing code: +7 47364
- OKTMO ID: 20727000001
- Website: www.new-voronezh.ru

Novovoronezh (Russian: Нововоро́неж) is a town in Voronezh Oblast, Russia, located on the left bank of the Don River 55 kilometers (34 mi) south of Voronezh. Population: 30,658 (2021 census); 32,635 (2010 census); 36,961 (2002 census); 35,666 (1989 Soviet census).

== Administrative and municipal status ==
Within the framework of administrative divisions, it is incorporated as Novovoronezh Urban Okrug—an administrative unit with the status equal to that of the districts. As a municipal division, this administrative unit also has urban okrug status.

== Economy ==
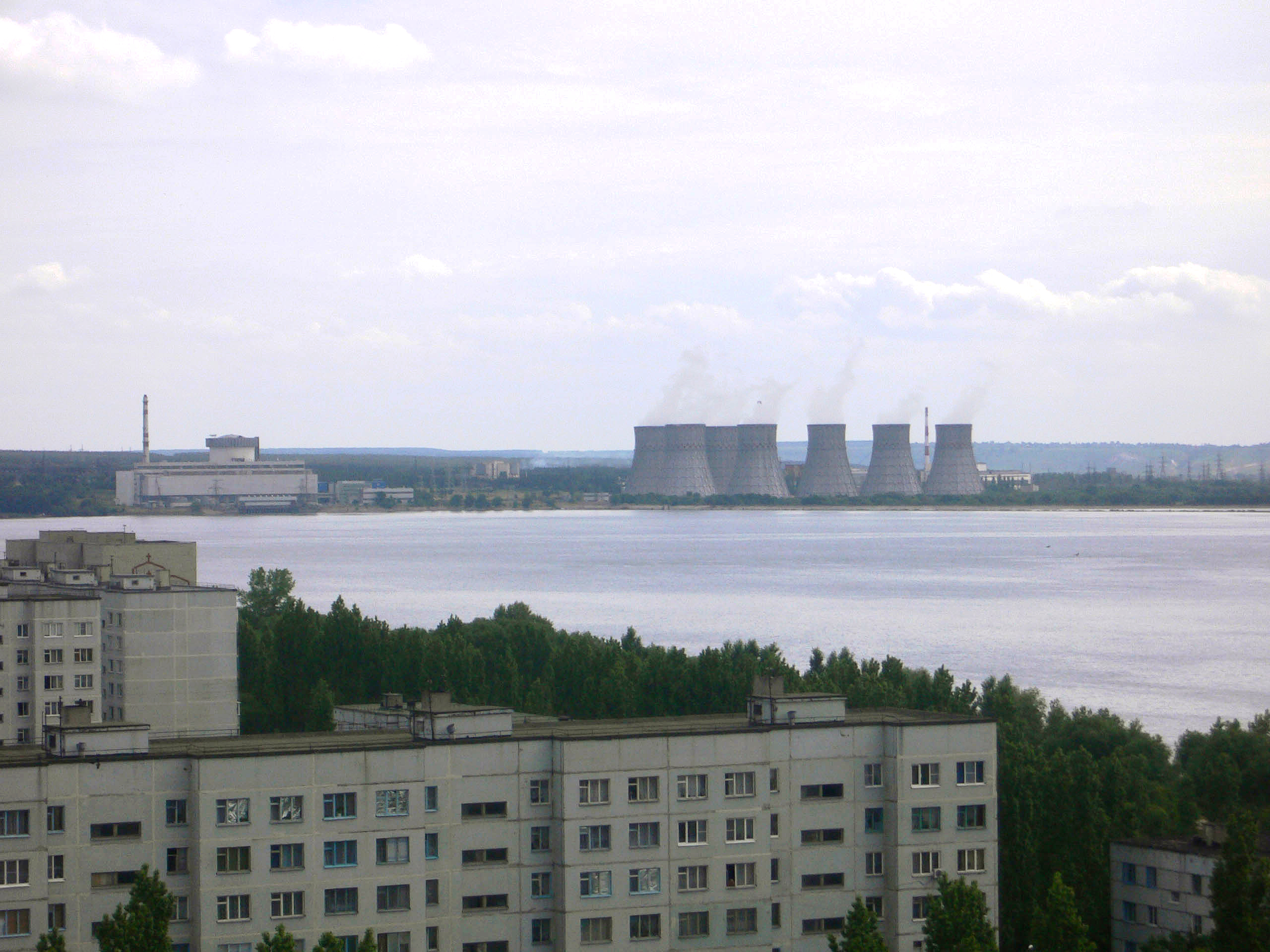
View of the Novovoronezh Nuclear Power Plant

The Novovoronezh Nuclear Power Plant is located in the town.

== History ==
Novovoronezh was established along with the start of the future nuclear power plant construction works in 1957. It was then called the urban settlement of Novo-Graessovsky, but renamed its current name later the same year.

The first unit of 210 MW of the Novovoronezh Nuclear Power Plant was put into power on September 30, 1964.

From 1959 to 1963 Novovoronezh was the center of the Novovoronezh district, and its administrative status was upgraded from the urban settlement to a town in 1987.

In 2020, an ambiguous monument was erected in the city to the legendary founder of the city Alyonka, who, according to legend, found a good place and brought her fellow villagers there. Thanks to this monument, Novovoronezh became famous throughout Russia, Ukraine and Belarus. The forged sculptural composition, which cost the city a million rubles and caused negative feedback from citizens, was dismantled three days after installation and later sold at auction for 2.6 million rubles. with a starting price of 1 million rubles. The updated monument to Alyonka, but already made of bronze, was opened on July 1, 2022.

== Twin towns — sister cities ==
- Paks, Hungary
