= Rosenergoatom =

Company

- Native name: Росэнергоатом
- Company type: Subsidiary
- Founded: 7 September 1992
- Headquarters: Russia
- Revenue: $4.21 billion (2016)
- Net income: $158 million (2016)
- Total assets: $24.1 billion (2016)
- Parent: Atomenergoprom
- Website: www.rosenergoatom.ru

Rosenergoatom (Russian: Росэнергоатом) is the Russian nuclear power station operations subsidiary of Atomenergoprom.

== Ownership and formation ==
The company was established on 7 September 1992 in Presidential decree 1055: "On operating organization of nuclear power plants in the Russian Federation". According to the decree on 8 September 2001 all Russian civil nuclear power plants as well as all supporting companies were incorporated into Rosenergoatom. On 19 January 2007 the Russian Parliament adopted the law "On the peculiarities of management and disposition of the property and shares of organizations using nuclear energy and on relevant changes to some legislative acts of the Russian Federation", which created Atomenergoprom – a holding company for all Russian civil nuclear industry, including Rosenergoatom, nuclear fuel producer and supplier TVEL, uranium trader Tekhsnabexport (Tenex) and nuclear facilities constructor Atomstroyexport.

In August 2008 Rosenergoatom was reorganized into an open joint-stock company and renamed Energoatom. All shares of the company were transferred to Atomenergoprom by the end of 2008. In 2009 the previous name was reinstated.

== Activities ==
Per 2021, Rosenergoatom operates 11 nuclear power plants with 38 reactors. There is a plan to increase the number of reactors in operation to 59 by 2030.

Floating mobile nuclear power plant Akademik Lomonosov is connected to the grid, commercial operation has been planned to May, 2022.

== See also ==
- Energy policy of Russia
- Nuclear power in Russia
- Rosatom
