= List of Russian small nuclear reactors =

Russia has the largest number of small nuclear reactors in the world.

Sortable table
Name	Power (in MW_{e})	Technology	Producer	Status
EGP-6	11	RBMK	IPPE & Teploelektroproekt Design	Operating
ELENA*	0.068	PWR	Kurchatov Institute	Conceptual design
ABV	3-10	PWR	OKBM Afrikantov & IPPE	Detailed design
KLT-20	20	PWR	OKBM Afrikantov	Conceptual design
KLT-40	35	PWR	OKBM Afrikantov	Under construction
VK-300	250	BWR	Kurchatov Institute, IPPE & RDIPE	Detailed design
VKT-12	12	BWR	OKB Gidropress	Shelved
VVER-300	300	BWR	OKB Gidropress	Conceptual design
VBER-300	325	PWR	OKBM Afrikantov	Licensing stage
VBER-150	110	PWR	OKBM Afrikantov	Conceptual design
VKR-MT	300	BWR	VNIIAM & Kurchatov Institute	Feasibility study
BGR-300	130	PWR	Kurchatov Institute	Feasibility study
MBUR-12	12	SFR	OKBM & IPPE	Early conceptual design
BN GT-300	300	SFR	OKBM, IPPE & SPb AEP	Conceptual design
BMN-170	170	SFR	OKBM, IPPE & SPb AEP	Conceptual design
RBEC-M	340	LFR	Kurchatov Institute	Feasibility study
RITM-200	50	PWR	OKBM Afrikantov	Under construction
GT-MHR	285	HTGR	OKBM Afrikantov	Conceptual design completed
MHR-T	4х205.5	HTGR	OKBM Afrikantov	Conceptual design
MHR-100	25 - 87	HTGR	OKBM Afrikantov	Conceptual design
SVBR	10–100	LFR	OKB Gidropress & IPPE	Conceptual design
MARS	6	MSR	Kurchatov Institute	Conceptual design
Angstrem	6	LFR	OKB Gidropress	Conceptual design
BRUS-150	150	LFR	IPPE	???
MTSPNR	2	HTGR	RDIPE	Conceptual design
NIKA-70	15	PWR	RDIPE	Conceptual design
SAKHA-92	1	PWR	OKBM	Conceptual design
RIT	42	PWR	OKBM	Preliminary design
BREST-OD-300	300	LFR	RDIPE	Detailed design
UNITHERM	6.6	PWR	RDIPE	Conceptual design
RUTA-70	70	PWR	RDIPE & IPPE	Conceptual design
SHELF	6	PWR	RDIPE	Conceptual design

* Once built, ELENA will be the smallest commercial nuclear reactor ever built.

== See also ==
- Small modular reactor
- Micro nuclear reactor
- List of nuclear reactors
- List of small nuclear reactor designs
- List of United States Naval reactors
- List of Soviet Naval reactors
