= Nuclear power in Russia =

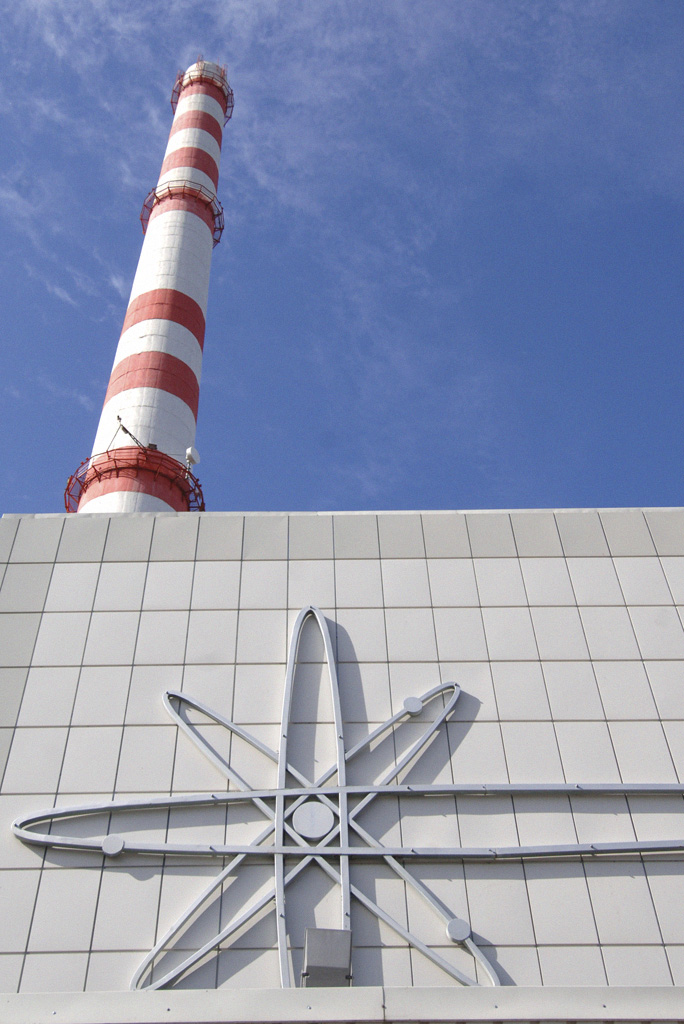
Leningrad Nuclear Power Plant

Russia is one of the world's largest producers of nuclear energy. In 2020, total electricity generated in nuclear power plants in Russia was 215.746 TWh, 20.28% of all electric power plant generation. The installed gross capacity of Russian nuclear reactors was 29.4 GW as of December 2020. In 2025, nuclear power produced 19% of the country’s electricity.

== Recent history ==
In accordance with legislation passed in 2001, all Russian civil reactors are operated by Rosenergoatom. More recently in 2007, Russian Parliament adopted the law "On the peculiarities of the management and disposition of the property and shares of organizations using nuclear energy and on relevant changes to some legislative acts of the Russian Federation", which created Atomenergoprom - a holding company for all Russian civil nuclear industry, including Energoatom, nuclear fuel producer and supplier TVEL, uranium trader Tekhsnabexport (Tenex) and nuclear facilities constructor Atomstroyexport.

In 2011, 11 RBMK reactors were given life extensions and uprated in output by about 5%. Environmentalists Aleksandr Nikitin and Igor Koudrik say that these reactors are of an "inherently unsafe design", which cannot be improved through upgrades and modernization, and some reactor parts are impossible to replace. Russian environmental groups say that the lifetime extensions "violate Russian law, because the projects have not undergone environmental assessments". But officials and scientists from various institutions have claimed that the reactors have undergone serious modifications and are safe. 4 of them have subsequently been shut down.

Global status of nuclear deployment as of 2017 (source: see file description) Operating reactors, building new reactors

The overnight cost of construction in the seventies was a low 800 $/kW in 2016 dollars. In 2019, a S&P Global Ratings report stated Russia's nuclear construction costs were well below European levels because of vertical integration, good learning-curve effects from serial production, and the large currency devaluation of 2014.

The Russian nuclear industry employs around 200,000 people. Russia is recognized for its nuclear disaster expertise and for the safety of its technology. Statements made in the review of Russian reactor safety [8] that "Requirements on placing the nuclear installation should not contain additional restrictions in comparison with other industrial facilities," suggest that nuclear plants could be placed within cities and are not considered to pose exceptional dangers. Russia is also pursuing an ambitious plan to increase sales of Russian-built reactors overseas, and had 39 reactors under construction or planned overseas as of 2018.

The VVER-1200 pressurised water reactor is the system currently offered for construction, being an evolution of the VVER-1000 with increased power output to about 1200 MWe (gross) and providing additional passive safety features. In August 2016, the first VVER-1200, Novovoronezh II-1, was connected to the grid.

Through its membership in the multi-nation ITER project, Russia participates in the design of nuclear fusion reactors.

In 2013, the Russian state allocated 80.6 billion rubles ($2.4 billion) toward the growth of its nuclear industry, especially export projects where Russian companies build, own and operate the power station, such as the Akkuyu Nuclear Power Plant.

In 2016, initial plans were announced to build 11 new nuclear power reactors by 2030, including the first VVER-600, a smaller two-cooling-circuit version of the VVER-1200, designed for smaller regions and markets. Outline plans for near-surface disposal facilities for low and intermediate-level waste, and deep burial disposal facilities for high-level waste were also approved in the Krasnoyarsk Krai region.

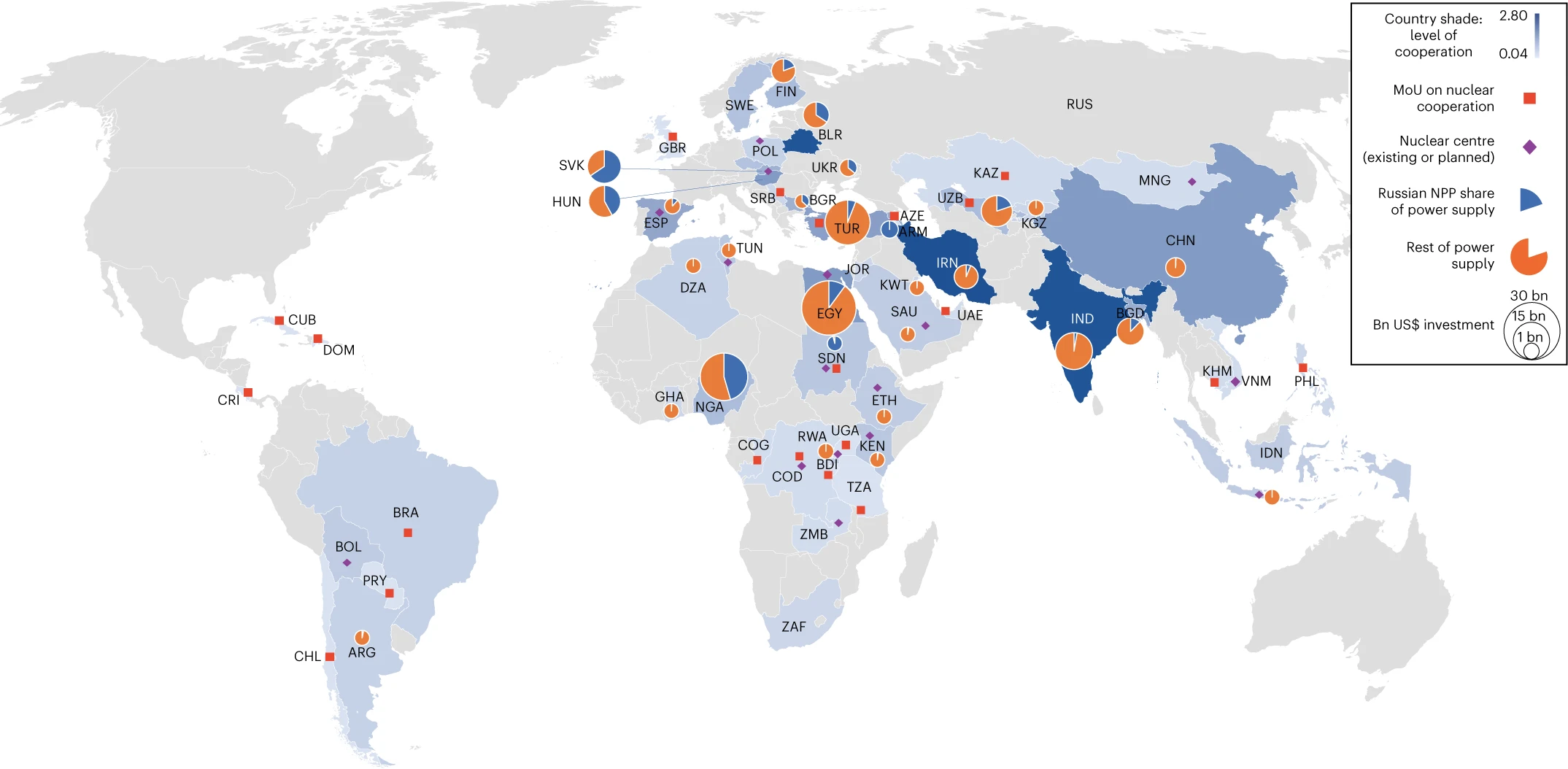
Russian nuclear engagements around the world according to a 2023 study, showing the intensity and level of bilateral collaboration in the nuclear sector in shades of blue

In October 2017, Rosatom was reported to be considering postponing commissioning new nuclear plants in Russia due to excess generation capacity and that new nuclear electricity prices are higher than for existing plants. The Russian government is considering reducing support for new nuclear under its support contracts, called Dogovor Postavki Moshnosti (DPM), which guarantee developers a return on investment through increased payments from consumers for 20 years. In 2019, a S&P Global Ratings report stated that "We expect domestic nuclear capacity to increase only moderately because electricity demand in Russia is stagnating, given only modest GDP growth, a significant potential for energy savings, and the government's intention to avoid raising electricity prices through additional increases in capacity payments".

Russia's first floating nuclear power plant, Akademik Lomonosov, is equipped to provide power to a remote Russian town on the Bering Strait. The nuclear unit features small modular reactors (SMRs) technology.

== Nuclear power reactors ==
=== Reactors in operation ===
Nuclear power plants in Russia (view)
Active plants
Closed plants
Unfinished plants
Plants under construction

Seven of Russia's reactors are of the RBMK 1000 type, similar to the one at Chernobyl Nuclear Power Plant. The rest of the reactors are PWR designs from the VVER series.

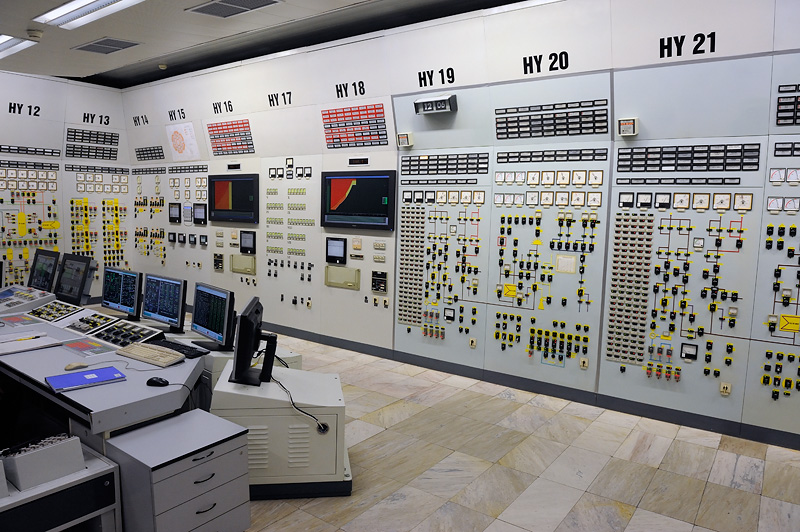
Control room of a VVER-1000 in 2009, Kozloduy Unit 5

Plant name	Unit No.	Type	Model	Status	Capacity (MW)	Begin building	Commercial operation	Closed
Akademik Lomonosov	1	PWR	KLT-40S	Operational	32	15 Apr 2007	19 Dec 2019	
Akademik Lomonosov	2	PWR	KLT-40S	Operational	32	15 Apr 2007	19 Dec 2019	
Balakovo	1	PWR	VVER-1000/V-320	Operational	950	1 Dec 1980	23 May 1986	
Balakovo	2	PWR	VVER-1000/V-320	Operational	950	1 Aug 1981	18 Jan 1988	
Balakovo	3	PWR	VVER-1000/V-320	Operational	950	1 Nov 1982	8 Apr 1989	
Balakovo	4	PWR	VVER-1000/V-320	Operational	950	1 Apr 1984	22 Dec 1993	
Beloyarsk	1	LWGR	AMB-100	Shut down	102	1 Jun 1958	26 Apr 1964	1 Jan 1983
Beloyarsk	2	LWGR	AMB-200	Shut down	146	1 Jan 1962	1 Dec 1969	1 Jan 1990
Beloyarsk	3	SFR	BN-600	Operational	560	1 Jan 1969	1 Nov 1981	
Beloyarsk	4	SFR	BN-800	Operational	789	18 Jul 2006	10 Dec 2015	
Beloyarsk	5	SFR	BN-1200	Planned	1100			
Bilibino	1	LWGR	EGP-6	Shut down	11	1 Jan 1970	1 Apr 1974	14 Jan 2019
Bilibino	2	LWGR	EGP-6	Shut down	11	1 Jan 1970	1 Feb 1975	3 Dec 2025
Bilibino	3	LWGR	EGP-6	Shut down	11	1 Jan 1970	1 Feb 1976	11 Dec 2025
Bilibino	4	LWGR	EGP-6	Shut down	11	1 Jan 1970	1 Jan 1977	30 Dec 2025
Kalinin	1	PWR	VVER-1000/V-338	Operational	950	1 Feb 1977	12 Jun 1985	
Kalinin	2	PWR	VVER-1000/V-338	Operational	950	1 Feb 1982	3 Mar 1987	
Kalinin	3	PWR	VVER-1000/V-320	Operational	950	1 Oct 1985	8 Nov 2005	
Kalinin	4	PWR	VVER-1000/V-320	Operational	950	1 Aug 1986	25 Dec 2012	
Kaliningrad	1	PWR	VVER-1200/V-491	Unfinished	1109	22 Feb 2012		
Kola	1	PWR	VVER-440/V-230	Operational	441	1 May 1970	28 Dec 1973	
Kola	2	PWR	VVER-440/V-230	Operational	441	1 May 1970	21 Feb 1975	
Kola	3	PWR	VVER-440/V-213	Operational	441	1 Apr 1977	3 Dec 1982	
Kola	4	PWR	VVER-440/V-213	Operational	441	1 Aug 1976	6 Dec 1984	
Kola II	1	PWR	VVER-S-600	Planned	600	(2028)	(2034)	
Kola II	2	PWR	VVER-S-600	Planned	600	(2028)	(2034)	
Kursk	1	LWGR	RBMK-1000	Shut down	925	1 Jun 1972	12 Oct 1977	19 Dec 2021
Kursk	2	LWGR	RBMK-1000	Shut down	925	1 Jan 1973	17 Aug 1979	31 Jan 2024
Kursk	3	LWGR	RBMK-1000	Operational	925	1 Apr 1978	30 Mar 1984	
Kursk	4	LWGR	RBMK-1000	Operational	925	1 May 1981	5 Feb 1986	
Kursk	5	LWGR	RBMK-1000	Unfinished	925	1985		
Kursk	6	LWGR	RBMK-1000	Unfinished	925	1985		
Kursk II	1	PWR	VVER-TOI/V-510	Operational	1115	29 Apr 2018	1 May 2026	
Kursk II	2	PWR	VVER-TOI/V-510	Under construction	1115	15 Apr 2019	(2027)	
Kursk II	3	PWR	VVER-TOI/V-510	Under construction	1115	31 Jan 2026		
Kursk II	4	PWR	VVER-TOI	Planned	1115			
Leningrad	1	LWGR	RBMK-1000	Shut down	925	1 Mar 1970	1 Nov 1974	21 Dec 2018
Leningrad	2	LWGR	RBMK-1000	Shut down	925	1 Jun 1970	11 Feb 1976	10 Nov 2020
Leningrad	3	LWGR	RBMK-1000	Operational	925	1 Dec 1973	29 Jun 1980	
Leningrad	4	LWGR	RBMK-1000	Operational	925	1 Feb 1975	29 Aug 1981	
Leningrad II	1	PWR	VVER-1200/V-491	Operational	1085	25 Oct 2008	29 Oct 2018	
Leningrad II	2	PWR	VVER-1200/V-491	Operational	1085	15 Apr 2010	22 Mar 2021	
Leningrad II	3	PWR	VVER-1200	Under construction	1085	14 Mar 2024	(2030)	
Leningrad II	4	PWR	VVER-1200	Under construction	1085	21 Mar 2025	(2032)	
MPEB No. 1	1	PWR	RITM-200S	Under construction	53	30 Aug 2022	(2027)	
MPEB No. 1	2	PWR	RITM-200S	Under construction	53	30 Aug 2022	(2027)	
MPEB No. 2	1	PWR	RITM-200S	Planned	53	(2022)	(2027)	
MPEB No. 2	2	PWR	RITM-200S	Planned	53	(2022)	(2027)	
MPEB No. 3	1	PWR	RITM-200S	Planned	53	(2022)	(2028)	
MPEB No. 3	2	PWR	RITM-200S	Planned	53	(2022)	(2028)	
MPEB No. 4	1	PWR	RITM-200S	Planned	53	(2022)	(2031)	
MPEB No. 4	2	PWR	RITM-200S	Planned	53	(2022)	(2031)	
Novovoronezh	1	PWR	VVER/V-210	Shut down	197	1 Jul 1957	31 Dec 1964	16 Feb 1988
Novovoronezh	2	PWR	VVER/V-365	Shut down	336	1 Jun 1964	14 Apr 1970	29 Aug 1990
Novovoronezh	3	PWR	VVER-440/V-179	Shut down	385	1 Jul 1967	29 Jun 1972	25 Dec 2016
Novovoronezh	4	PWR	VVER 440/V-179	Operational	385	1 Jul 1967	24 Mar 1973	
Novovoronezh	5	PWR	VVER-1000/V-187	Operational	950	1 Mar 1974	20 Feb 1981	
Novovoronezh II	1	PWR	VVER-1200/V-392M	Operational	1114	24 Jun 2008	27 Feb 2017	
Novovoronezh II	2	PWR	VVER-1200/V-392M	Operational	1114	12 Jul 2009	6 Nov 2019	
Novovoronezh II	3	PWR	VVER-1200	Planned	1175			
Obninsk	1	LWGR	AM-1	Shut down	5	1 Jan 1951	1 Dec 1954	29 Apr 2002
Rostov	1	PWR	VVER-1000/V-320	Operational	950	1 Sep 1981	25 Dec 2001	
Rostov	2	PWR	VVER-1000/V-320	Operational	950	1 May 1983	10 Dec 2010	
Rostov	3	PWR	VVER-1000/V-320	Operational	950	15 Sep 2009	27 Dec 2014	
Rostov	4	PWR	VVER-1000/V-320	Operational	1011	16 Jun 2010	28 Sep 2018	
Sakha	1	PWR	RITM-200N	Planned	55	(2024)	(2028)	
Seversk	1	FBR	BREST-300	Under construction	280	8 Jun 2021	(2026)	
Smolensk	1	LWGR	RBMK-1000	Operational	925	1 Oct 1975	30 Sep 1983	
Smolensk	2	LWGR	RBMK-1000	Operational	925	1 Jun 1976	2 Jul 1985	
Smolensk	3	LWGR	RBMK-1000	Operational	925	1 May 1984	12 Oct 1990	
Smolensk II	1	PWR	VVER-TOI	Planned	1300			
Smolensk II	2	PWR	VVER-TOI	Planned	1300			

== International projects ==
Country	NPP Reactor	Type	MWe net	MWe gross	Construction start	Commercially operational
Bangladesh	Ruppur-1	VVER-1200/523	1080	1200	2017-11-30	2025
Bangladesh	Ruppur-2	VVER-1200/523	1080	1200	2018-07-14	2025
Belarus	Belarusian-1	VVER-1200/491	1110	1194	2013-11-08	2021-06-10
Belarus	Belarusian-2	VVER-1200/491	1110	1194	2014-06-03	2023-05-13
China	Tianwan-1	VVER-1000/428	990	1060	1999-10-20	2007-05-17
China	Tianwan-2	VVER-1000/428	990	1060	2000-10-20	2007-08-16
China	Tianwan-3	VVER-1000/428М	1060	1126	2012-12-27	2018-02-14
China	Tianwan-4	VVER-1000/428М	1060	1126	2013-09-27	2018-12-22
China	Tianwan-7	VVER-1200/491	1100	1200	2021-05-19	2026
China	Tianwan-8	VVER-1200/491	1100	1200	2022-02-25	2027
China	Xudabao-3	VVER-1200/491	1100	1200	2021-07-28	2026
China	Xudabao-4	VVER-1200/491	1100	1200	2022-05-19	2027
Egypt	El Dabaa-1	VVER-1200/529	1100	1200	2022-07-20	
Egypt	El Dabaa-2	VVER-1200/529	1100	1200	2022-11-19	
Egypt	El Dabaa-3	VVER-1200/529	1100	1200	2023-05-03	
Egypt	El Dabaa-4	VVER-1200/529	1100	1200	2024-01-23	
Finland	Hanhikivi-1	VVER-1200/AES-2006		1200	cancelled	cancelled
India	Kudankulam-1	VVER-1000/412	932	1000	2002-03-31	2014-12-31
India	Kudankulam-2	VVER-1000/412	932	1000	2002-07-04	2017-03-31
India	Kudankulam-3	VVER-1000/412	917	1000	2017-06-29	2025
India	Kudankulam-4	VVER-1000/412	917	1000	2017-10-23	2025
India	Kudankulam-5	VVER-1000/412	917	1000	2021-06-29	2027
India	Kudankulam-6	VVER-1000/412	917	1000	2021-12-20	2027
Iran	Bushehr-1	VVER-1000/446	915	1000	1975-05-01 (1995)	2013-09-23
Iran	Bushehr-2	VVER-1000/446	915	1000	2016-09-10	2025
Iran	Bushehr-3	VVER-1000/446	915	1000	2016-09-10	2027
Turkey	Akkuyu-1	VVER-1200/509	1114	1200	2018-04-03	2026
Turkey	Akkuyu-2	VVER-1200/509	1114	1200	2020-04-08	2027
Turkey	Akkuyu-3	VVER-1200/509	1114	1200	2021-03-10	2027
Turkey	Akkuyu-4	VVER-1200/509	1114	1200	2022-07-21	2028
Ukraine	Khmelnytskyi-3/4	VVER-1000/392B	950	1000	cancelled	cancelled
Vietnam	Ninh Thuan 1-1/2	VVER-1000/428	950	1000	cancelled	cancelled
Vietnam	Ninh Thuan 1-3/4	VVER-1000/428	950	1000	cancelled	cancelled

In addition Atomstroyexport challenging NPP projects list contains:

- Temelin NPP Power Units 3/4 (Czech Republic)
- Jordan NPP (single-unit NPP with an option for the second power unit)
- Metsamor NPP Power Units 3/4 (Armenia)
- NPP with the Reactor Plant VBER-300 (Kazakhstan)
- Sanming NPP (China)

In March 2022, Russia captured the Zaporizhzhia Nuclear Power Plant, now operated by Rosatom.

In August 2022, the Hungarian Nuclear Energy Authority authorized Rosatom to expand the nuclear power plant at Paks with two new VVER reactors with capacity of 1.2 gigawatts each.

== Nuclear engineering companies ==
After 2007, powers and assets were to be transferred to the newly created Rosatom.

- Atomenergomash: power engineering company; produces steam generators for NPPs
- Atommash: by far Russia's largest nuclear engineering company designed to build up to 8 reactors per year.
- Atomstroyexport: nuclear power equipment and service export monopoly
- OKBM Afrikantov: nuclear reactor design and engineering company. The world's leading company in production of fast breeder reactors.
- OKB Gidropress: nuclear reactor design and engineering company

== Safety ==
Rosatom, responding to the 2011 Japanese nuclear accidents, announced that it would perform "stress tests" on all its reactors "to judge their ability to withstand earthquakes more powerful than the original design anticipated".

== See also ==
- Energy policy of Russia
- Rosatom
- Russian floating nuclear power station
- Nuclear energy policy
- Juragua Nuclear Power Plant, (Cuba)
