= ELENA reactor =

The ELENA reactor is a compact Russian pressurized water reactor (PWR) of 68-kWe generating capacity currently being developed by the Kurchatov Institute. To develop the reactor, techniques were used derived from the construction and operation of marine and space power plants and the operational experience of the GAMMA reactor.

It is intended for use in remote areas, towns with a population of 1500–2000, or individual consumers requiring a highly reliable power supply, such as hospitals.

The reactor can also be used for water desalination. As of 2014, it is the smallest commercial nuclear reactor being developed.

The principal of its development are Kurchatov Institute, Krasnaya zvezda, Izhorskiye Zavody, Atomenergoproekt and VNIINT (ВНИИНМ, Высокотехнологический научно-исследовательский институт неорганических материалов имени академика А.А. Бочвара).

== See also ==
- Nuclear power
- Small modular reactor
- List of nuclear reactors
- List of United States Naval reactors
- List of Soviet Naval reactors
- List of Russian small nuclear reactors
