= Soviet naval reactors =

List of nuclear reactor types

Soviet naval reactors have been used to power both military and civilian vessels, including:

- Nuclear submarines:
  - Attack submarines
  - Cruise missile submarines
  - Ballistic missile submarines
- Nuclear icebreakers:
  - Soviet icebreaker Lenin
  - Arktika-class icebreakers
  - Taymyr-class icebreakers
- Russian floating nuclear power stations:
  - Akademik Lomonosov
- Nuclear cruisers:
  - Kirov-class battlecruisers
- Merchant ship:
  - Sevmorput
- Command ship:
  - SSV-33 Ural

They have included both pressurized water reactors and a relatively few liquid metal fast reactors.

OKBM Afrikantov has been the primary designer of naval reactors for the Soviet/Russian Navy for more than 60 years.

== Reactor types ==
| Reactor system | Reactor designation | Type | Power (in MW_{t}) | Date of first deploy | Uses |
|---|---|---|---|---|---|
| ??? | 2* VM-A | PWR | 2* 70 MW | 1959 | November-class attack submarines Echo-class cruise missile submarines Hotel-class SLBM submarines |
| ??? | 2* VT RM-1 | LMFR | 2* 73 MW | 1963 | Attack submarine K-27 |
| OK-300 | 2* VM-4 | PWR | 2* 72 MW | 1967 | Victor I; II-class attack submarines |
| OK-350 | 1* VM-4-1 | PWR | 1* 89 MW | 1967 | Charlie-class cruise missile submarines |
| OK-700 | 2* VM-4-2 | PWR | 2* 90 MW | 1967 | Yankee-class SLBM submarines |
| ??? | 2* V-5R | PWR | 2* 177 MW | 1969 | Papa-class attack submarine |
| OK-900 | 2* ??? | PWR | 2* 159 MW | 1970 | Icebreaker Lenin after renovation |
| OK-550 | 1* BM-40A | LMFR | 1* 155 MW | 1971 | Alfa-class attack submarines |
| OK-700 | 2* VM-4B | PWR | 2* 90 MW | 1972 | Delta I-class SLBM submarines Delta II-class SLBM submarines |
| OK-900A (?) | 2* KLT-40M | PWR | 2* 171 MW | 1975 | Arktika-class icebreakers |
| OK-700A | 2* VM-4S | PWR | 2* 90 MW | 1976 | Delta III-class SLBM submarines |
| OK-300A (?) | 2* VM-4A | PWR | 2* 72 MW | 1977 | Victor III-class attack submarines |
| OK-650M | 2* ??? | PWR | 2* 190 MW | 1980 | Oscar-class cruise missile submarines |
| OK-900 | 2* KN-3 | PWR | 2* 300 MW | 1980 | Kirov-class battlecruisers |
| OK-650 | 2* ??? | PWR | 2* 190 MW | 1981 | Typhoon-class SLBM submarines |
| OK-650B-3 | 1* ??? | PWR | 1* 190 MW | 1983 | Attack submarine K-278 (Mike class) |
| OK-650A | 1* ??? | PWR | 1* 190 MW | 1984 | Sierra-class attack submarines |
| OK-9VM | 1* ??? | PWR | 1* 190 MW | 1984 | Akula-class submarine |
| OK-700A (?) | 2* VM-4SG | PWR | 2* 90 MW | 1984 | Delta IV-class SLBM submarines |
| ??? | 1* KLT-40M | PWR | 1* 171 MW | 1988 | Taymyr-class icebreakers |
| ??? | 1* KLT-40 | PWR | 1* 135 MW | 1988 | Merchant ship Sevmorput |
| OK-900 (?) | 2* KN-3 (VM-16 (?)) | PWR | 2* 171 MW | 1989 | SSV-33 Ural-command ship |
| ??? | E-17 | PWR | 15 MW | 2003 | Russian submarine Losharik |
| OK-150 | 3* ??? | PWR | 3* 90 MW | 1959 | Icebreaker Lenin before renovation |
| OK-650B (?) | 2* ??? | PWR | 2* 190 MW | 2009 | Borei-class SLBM submarine |
| OK-650V (?) | 1* KPM-6(?)** | PWR | 1* 200 MW | 2013 | Graney-class attack submarines |
| ??? | 2* KLT-40S | PWR | 2* 150 MW | 2019 | Russian floating nuclear power station Akademik Lomonosov |
| ??? | 2* RITM-200 | PWR | 2* 175 MW | expected 2020 | Project 22220 icebreaker |

'**'KPM-6 is developed by OKBM Afrikantov.

== See also ==
- List of commercial nuclear reactors
- List of United States Naval reactors
- Nuclear marine propulsion
- Rolls-Royce PWR – United Kingdom's naval reactors
- United States Naval reactors
