= Klavdy Ippolitovich Shenfer =

Soviet electrical engineering scientist (1885–1946)

Claudius Ippolitovich Shenfer Клавдий Ипполитович Шенфер
- Born: May 26, 1885; Radviliškis
- Died: May 18, 1946; Moscow
- Education: Bauman Moscow State Technical University
- Scientific career
- Fields: Electrical engineering

Claudius Ippolitovich Shenfer (Russian: Клавдий Ипполитович Шенфер; 26 May 1885 - 18 May 1946) was a Soviet scientist in the field of Electrical engineering, professor, academician of the USSR Academy of Sciences.

== Biography ==
He was born in 1885 in the Radviliškis.

In 1904, he entered the Warsaw Polytechnic Institute. During the February Revolution of 1905-1907, he moved to Moscow. Two years later, he entered the mechanical department of the Imperial Moscow Technical School.

In 1911-1912, he was on a scientific mission in Germany, where he worked on experimental research questions on the commutation of collector machines of alternating current. Returning to Russia, he taught at the university.

Since 1930, he worked as a teacher at the Moscow Power Engineering Institute. Shenfer transferred 100,000 rubles to the Defense Fund during the Great Patriotic War.

He dealt with the theory and design of electrical machines (switching work in collector electrical machines, cascade schemes, transient regimes, electricity recovery). He is the author of textbooks on electric machines.

Awards and prizes: The Stalin Prize of the first degree (1943) - for many years of outstanding achievements, the Order of Lenin (1945), and the Order of the Red Banner of Labor (1940).

== Literature ==
- "Collector motors of alternating current", 1933.
- "Dynamos and DC motors", 1937.
- "Asynchronous machines", 1938.
