= International Reactor Innovative and Secure =

International Reactor Innovative and Secure (IRIS) is a Generation IV reactor design made by an international team of companies, laboratories, and universities and coordinated by Westinghouse. IRIS is hoped to open up new markets for nuclear power and make a bridge from Generation III reactor to Generation IV reactor technology. The design is not yet specific to reactor power output. Notably, a 335 MW output has been proposed, but it could be tweaked to be as low as a 100 MW unit.

IRIS is a smaller-scale design for a Pressurized water reactor (PWR) with an integral reactor coolant system layout, meaning the steam generators, pressurizer, control rod drive mechanisms, and reactor coolant pumps are all located within the reactor pressure vessel. This causes it to have a larger pressure vessel than an ordinary PWR despite a lower power rating, the size is more comparable to that of an ABWR.

Many of these design goals coincide with the objectives of the GNEP program launched by the Bush Administration. With large international acceptance, IRIS could be a very large part of GNEP, providing a plant type for user nations.

== Contributors ==
The project has included the work of a number of organizations around the world, this is a list of the major contributors:

Contributor	Country	Contributions
Industry
Westinghouse	United States	Overall coordination; leading core design, safety analyses and licensing, commercialization
BNFL	UK	Fuel cycle
Ansaldo Energia	Italy	Steam generators design
Ansaldo Camozzi	Italy	Steam generators fabrication
ENSA	Spain	Pressure vessel and internals
NUCLEP	Brazil	Containment
OKBM	Russia	Testing, desalination and district heating co-gen
LABORATORIES
ORNL	USA	I&C, PRA, desalination, shielding, pressurizer
CNEN	Brazil	Transient and safety analyses, pressurizer, desalination
ININ	Mexico	PRA, neutronics support
LEI	Lithuania	Safety analyses, PRA, district heating co-gen
ENEA	Italy	Testing, financial and manpower support
UNIVERSITIES
Politecnico di Milano	Italy	Safety analyses, shielding, thermal hydraulics, steam generators design, advanced control system
University of California, Berkeley	USA	Advanced cores, maintenance, security
Tokyo Institute of Technology	Japan	Advanced cores, PRA
University of Zagreb	Croatia	Neutronics, safety analyses
University of Pisa	Italy	Containment analyses, severe accident analyses, neutronics
Polytechnic University of Turin	Italy	Source term
University of Rome	Italy	Radwaste system
Georgia Institute of Technology	United States	Shielding, Fuel Design, and Reactivity Control
POWER PRODUCERS
Eletronuclear	Brazil	Developing country utility perspective

== Reactor Coolant System ==
The IRIS pressure vessel and systems contained within it

The coolant system consists of a pressurizer, Steam generators, and reactor coolant pumps (RCPs). These are all located within the reactor pressure vessel, making a very small, short loop that forms the primary coolant system, see the figure on the right for the relative locations of the components.

=== Pressurizer ===
Unlike ordinary PWRs, the pressurizer is not contained in a separate vessel and connected to the primary side, but rather is the top of the pressure vessel itself. Water line will be at some preset value, and then sprays and boilers within the pressurizer can be used to control pressure and water level. The unique aspect of this is that the pressurizer is of much greater volume than current plants, which helps to keep the pressure constant in accident situations.

=== Steam Generator ===
Water from the secondary (the water that is turned into steam and used in the turbine) enters at the bottom of the steam generators, and goes up through a helical coil to the top. The steam generators are once through, and the pressure is greater on the secondary side tubes (no boiling takes place in the tubes). The secondary side water is allowed to flash at the end of the steam generator tube and go out through the steam pipe. There are eight steam generators, as well as eight steam pipes and feedwater pipes.

=== Reactor Coolant Pumps (RCP) ===
The decision to put the RCPs on the inside of the vessel was a fairly radical innovation. With the existence of eight separate RCPs as opposed to the 2 or 4 of a typical PWR, when one pump goes out, that pump can be shut down and isolated, not be worked on until the next outage.

=== Core ===
It has in the past been proposed to use higher enrichments for IRIS, allowing a longer cycle life, but the design now calls for 4.95% enriched Uranium, which is the same as what is being used in current plants. The fuel is designed for a 3 to 3.5 year life, and half of the core will reloaded in outages. This longer life is accomplished by having a very large core running a relatively low power plant.

Reactivity is controlled almost entirely by control rods and burnable poisons. This eliminates the need for Boron in the primary water, which is a plus for plant chemistry.

== Containment ==
The containment of IRIS is spherical and set to be approximately 22–27 meters across. This is compared to 58 meters high and 40 meters in diameter for a typical 600 MW PWR. Additionally, two thirds of the containment will be underground, giving it a lower profile, in addition to its already very small footprint. While the containment will be smaller than typical plants, it will also be rated for a higher maximum pressure, increasing costs.

== Advantages ==
Most of the advantages of the new IRIS design are safety related, although Westinghouse claims that IRIS will be able to deliver power at competitive rates as well.

Due to Economies of scale, modern nuclear plants tend to be built with larger electrical outputs, such as the European Pressurized Reactor, which has scaled up power to 1600 MW in new plants. IRIS, on the other hand, is built to be used in countries where there are not extremely large electric power grids, mainly developing nations. Due to limitations on power of individual power stations versus total grid size, plants whose power is over a certain percentage of grid size are infeasible in such situations.

Due to simplifications and greater safety, it is believed by Westinghouse that in spite of its size, analysis estimated a target total cost of electricity at about 4 ¢/kWh. Given its small power and physical size, it is expected that multi-unit sites could be operated efficiently, Westinghouse estimates that a 3-unit site could be built in 9 years with a maximum cash outflow of 300 M$. One cost saver, for instance, is the need for only one control room, from which all units at a multi-unit site can be controlled.

Aside from economics, these are a few other advantages that the IRIS has:

- Fewer penetrations to the pressure vessel - by having the control rods and all drive mechanisms contained within the vessel, the need for dozens of small penetrations is eliminated, which are extremely costly. The only penetrations used are for the incoming and outgoing secondary coolant and for emergency safety systems.
- Large operating margins - the operating margins are typically the measure of a value compared to what that value would have to be to fail the fuel. IRIS effectively gets much lower operating margins by having a core with a much lower power density, while the core is mostly the same size as a current PWR, the thermal output is much smaller, making it much less likely to reach film boiling and fail in an accident.
- Lower radiation doses to workers - due to the confinement of all the RCS components and more shielding (by a larger water mass) result in low estimated doses for plant workers than current designs.
- Collaboration and research - incorporating so many universities and labs into the project is expected to have a number of benefits, one is contributing to the academic knowledge available for new plants, another is that researchers in many diverse countries with experience regarding the IRIS will be useful when they are deployed, because a goal of the project is to eventually build plants in countries that do not currently have nuclear plants.
- Lowered core damage frequency (CDF) - as a result of all the individual innovations that improve safety and an in depth Probabilistic risk assessment study that refine the net safety risk, IRIS has the lowest CDF (which is a quantitative measure of the probability of a major core accident taking place) associated with any proposed plant of 10^{−8}.
- Marketing and licensing - With the vastly improved safety, there should be a quick and easy licensing associated with the design, and it could occupy a large part of a growing market for small size nuclear power plants, which is also being targeted by other designs such as the Russian floating nuclear power station.

== Disadvantages and Criticisms ==
Compared to Generation III reactors, there are a lot more innovations that may require further investment and research. All the advantages of the reactor can't be proved until a plant is actually built.

== See also ==
- Generation III reactor
- Generation IV reactor
