= Power Machines =

Russian company

OJSC Power Machines
- Company type: Open Joint Stock Company
- Industry: Metal and power engineering, machinery
- Founded: 2000
- Headquarters: St. Petersburg, Russia
- Key people: Alexey Podkolzin (General Director)
- Products: Steam gas turbines, turbogenerators, other machinery
- Revenue: $1.18 billion (2017)
- Operating income: $−60.5 million (2017)
- Net income: $−167 million (2017)
- Total assets: $3.45 billion (2017)
- Total equity: $393 million (2017)
- Owner: Alexei Mordashov
- Number of employees: 8,000
- Website: www.power-m.ru

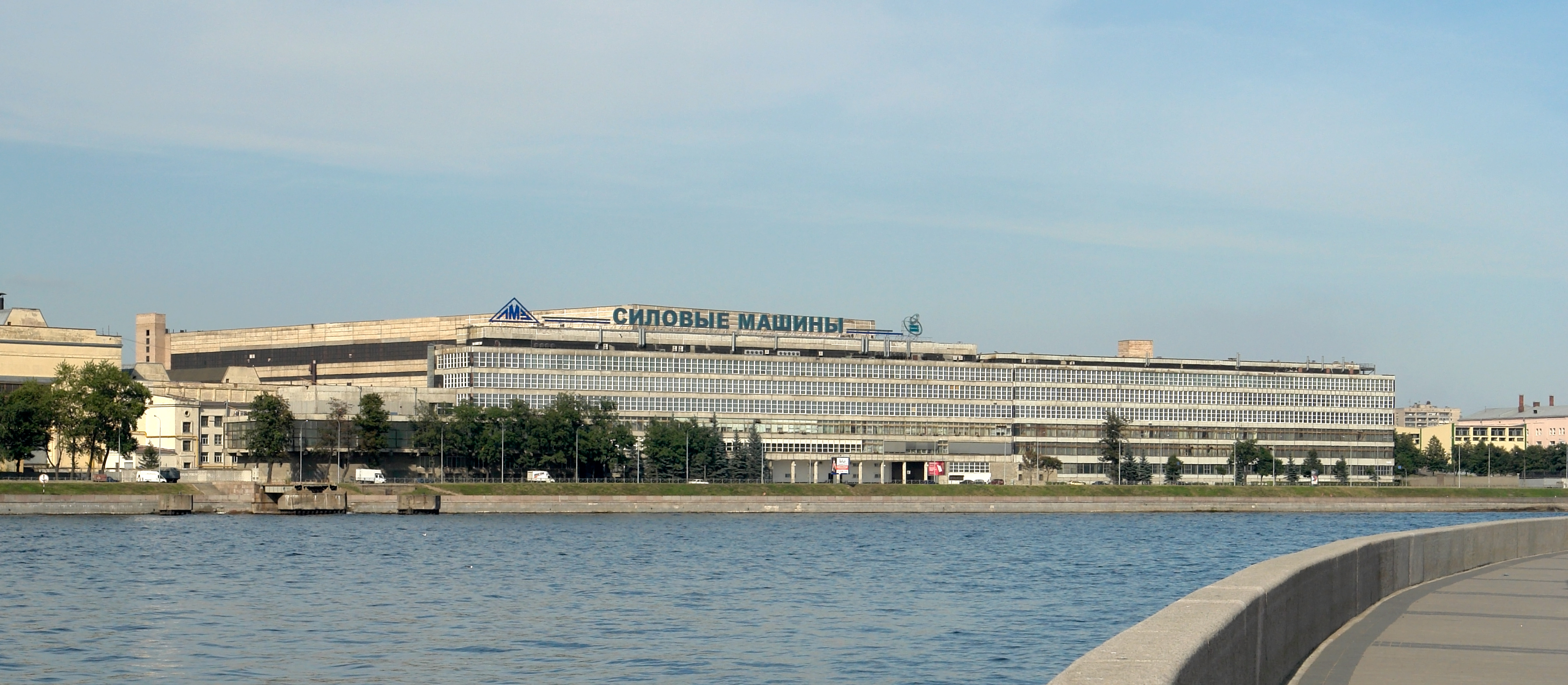
Power Machines plant building on Sverdlovskaya embankment in Saint Petersburg

OJSC Power Machines (translit. Siloviye Mashiny abbreviated as Silmash, Russian: ОАО «Силовы́е маши́ны») is a Russian energy systems machine-building company founded in 2000. It is headquartered in Saint Petersburg.

Power Machines manufactures steam turbines with capacity up to 1,200 MWe, including turbines for nuclear power plants. Its portfolio consists of turbine generators for the Leningrad Nuclear Power Plant II and the Novovoronezh Nuclear Power Plant II. Also, Power Machines has supplied equipment to 57 countries other than Russia with significant market in Asia.

== History ==
Power Machines company was established in the year 2000. Today it is a joint venture combining technological, industrial and intellectual resources of six world-famous Russian enterprises: Leningradsky Metallichesky zavod (established in 1857), Electrosila (1898), Turbine Blades’ Plant (1964), Kaluga Turbine Works (1946), Reostat Plant (1960) and Energomachexport (1966).

As of 31 December 2009 69.92% of shares were owned by Highstat Limited, a company controlled by Alexei Mordashov. 25% of shares were owned by Siemens and 5.08% by minor shareholders.

In December 2011 Highstat acquired Siemens's stake in Power Machines for less than US$280 million (3.6 rubles per share), below the market price (4.9 rubles per share). Power Machines was subsequently delisted from the MICEX-RTS stock exchange. In August 2012 Highstat made a mandatory offer of 4.53 rubles (US$0.139) per share to the remaining minority shareholders, which the Investor Protection Association said was significantly undervalued. Following a complaint filed by the association, the Federal Financial Markets Service fined Highstat 250,000 rubles.

In 2017, the company's CEO Roman Filippov was placed under temporary arrest on suspicions of divulging State secrets. Machine Powers was placed under US sanctions in 2018 for working to “support Russia’s attempted annexation of Crimea”, leading to the loss of a $500-million contract in Vietnam, a failed payment for a contract completed for Ukraine's DTEK, and the sale of its 35% stake in Siemens Gas Turbine Technologies LLC. In 2020, it was awarded the contract to build the 1.4 gigawatt Sirik power plant in Iran. In 2022, Power Machines assembled and tested its first domestically made high-power gas turbine, enabling Russia to replace imported equipment made unavailable since US sanctions.

== Structure ==
- Leningradsky Metallichesky Zavod (1857 establishment),
- Electrosila (1898 establishment),
- Turbine Blades’ Plant (1964 establishment),
- Kaluga Turbine Works (1964 establishment),
- NPO CKTI named after I. I. Polzunov (1927 establishment),
- Energomashexport (1966 establishment),
- Power Machines – Reostat Plant (1960 establishment).

== Products ==
- GTE180 development, GTE170 production, GTE160, GT100, GTE-150, GTE-250 GTE-300 projects, GTE65, unit M94yu2 (Licensed V94.2 Siemens SGT5-2000E in 1994)
- SGTT build licensed SGT5-2000E (GTE160 GTE180 TPE180), SGT5-4000F, SGT-600 (Baltika-25)
- Silmash Gas and Steam Turbines K- and T- for Power Plants (Nuclear Thermal and Hydroelectric)

== Management ==
The Board of Directors consists of eight members:

- From Severstal-group - Alexey Mordashov, Alexey Yegorov, Vladimir Lukin
- From Power Machines - Igor Kostin (General Director), Vadim Chechnev
- From Universal Invest - Igor Voskresensky
- From Siemens - Michael Zuss, Hans-Jurgen Vio
