= List of cancelled nuclear reactors in Russia =

This is a list of cancelled nuclear reactors and site projects in Russia.

== History ==
Throughout the 1970s and up to the late 1980s, Russia had been rapidly expanding its RBMK reactor program. Eighteen were originally planned across three sites including Kursk, Leningrad and Smolensk. However, in light of the Chernobyl incident in 1986, many of these reactors were either cancelled, or left unfinished. Some of these reactors had significant infrastructure already in place in preparation for construction but were halted as the reactors were seen as very unsafe.

In recent decades, construction was started on reactor projects all across the country using the newer VVER class of reactors. In some cases, complications with supply, export security and a variety of other factors have led to the suspension of construction or even permanent cancellation of these projects entirely.

This list displays the status of these projects and identifies them as cancelled plan, meaning the site never came to fruition; or cancelled construction, meaning facilities were constructed but further advancement was suspended.

== Cancelled nuclear reactors ==
Name	Unit	Type	Model	Status	Location	Net capacity in MW	Gross capacity in MW	Contract year	Construction start	Project close	Refs
Balakovo	5	PWR	VVER-1000	Cancelled construction	Balakovo, Saratov Oblast	950	1000	1987	-	1992-12-28	
Balakovo	6	PWR	VVER-1000	Cancelled construction	Balakovo, Saratov Oblast	950	1000	1987	-	1992-12-28	
Bashkir	1	PWR	VVER-1000	Cancelled plan	Bashkortostan	950	1000	1980	-	1991	
Bashkir	2	PWR	VVER-1000	Cancelled plan	Bashkortostan	950	1000	1980	-	1991	
Bashkir	3	PWR	VVER-1000	Cancelled plan	Bashkortostan	950	1000	1980	-	1991	
Bashkir	4	PWR	VVER-1000	Cancelled plan	Bashkortostan	950	1000	1980	-	1991	
Gorky	1	PWR	AST-500	Cancelled plan			500 (heat)	1982		1993	
Gorky	2	PWR	AST-500	Cancelled plan			500 (heat)	1982		1993	
Kostroma	1	LWGR	RBMKP-2400 / RBMK-1500	Cancelled plan		2400	2400 / 1500	1986		1986	
Kostroma	2	LWGR	RBMKP-2400 / RBMK-1500	Cancelled plan		2400	2400 / 1500	1986		1986	
Kursk	5	LWGR	RBMK-1000	Cancelled construction		925	1000	1985		2012	
Kursk	6	LWGR	RBMK-1000	Cancelled construction		925	1000	1986		1993	
Smolensk	4	LWGR	RBMK-1000	Cancelled plan		925	1000			1993	
Smolensk	5	LWGR	RBMK-1500	Cancelled plan		925	1000			1986	
Smolensk	6	LWGR	RBMK-1500	Cancelled plan		925	1000			1986	
Tatar	1	PWR	VVER-1000	Cancelled plan		1000	1200	1980		1990	
Tatar	2	PWR	VVER-1000	Cancelled plan		1000	1200	1980		1990	
Tatar	3	PWR	VVER-1000	Cancelled plan		1000	1200	1980		1990	
Tatar	4	PWR	VVER-1000	Cancelled plan		1000	1200	1980		1990	
Voronezh	1	PWR	AST-500	Cancelled plan			500 (heat)	1983		1990	
Voronezh	2	PWR	AST-500	Cancelled plan			500 (heat)	1983		1990	

== See also ==
- Nuclear power in Russia
