= Nizhny Novgorod State Technical University =

Technical university in Nizhny Novgorod, Russia

- Нижегородский государственный технический университет им. Р. Е. Алексеева
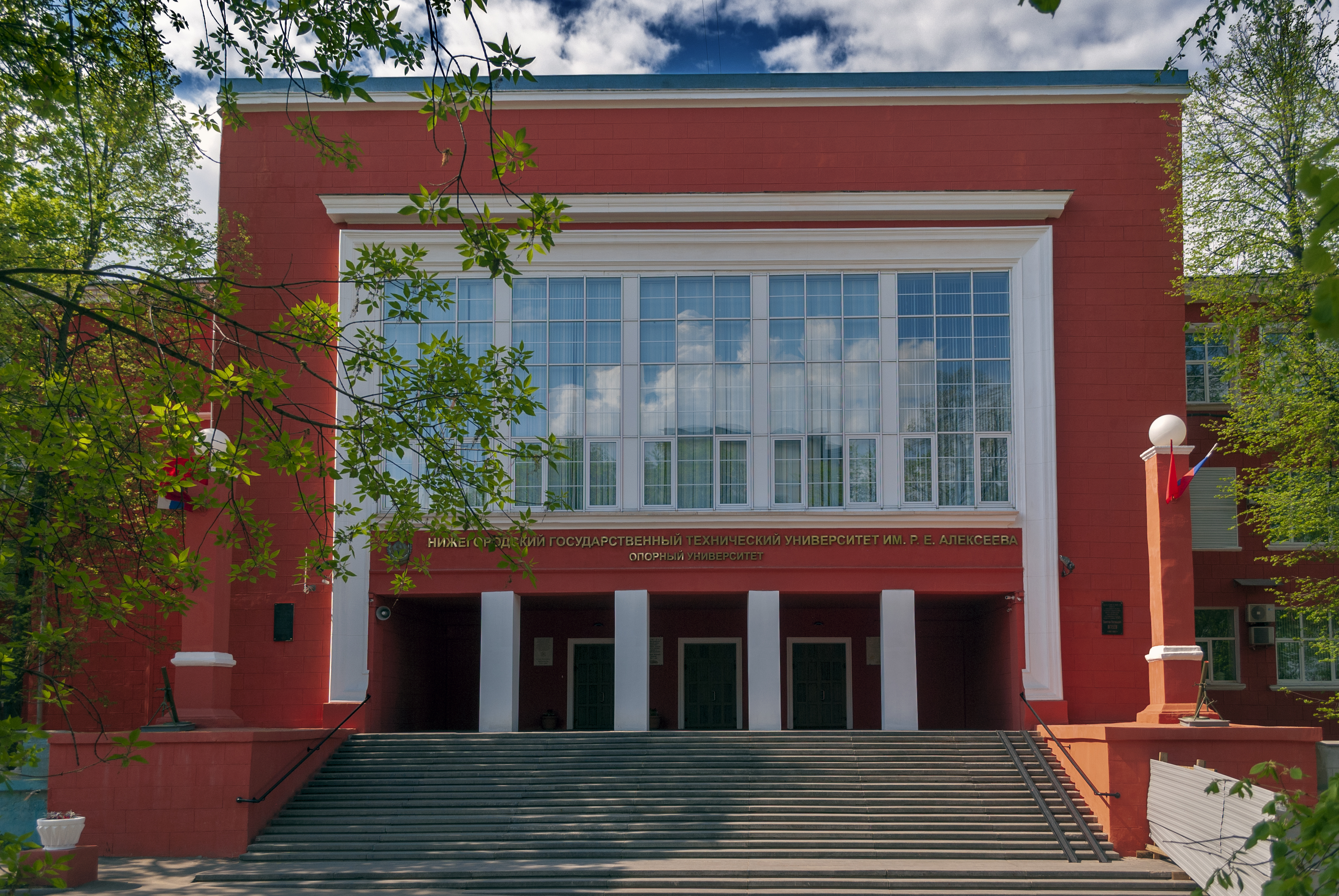
- Type: Public
- Established: 1917
- Rector: Дмитриев С. М.
- Students: 11000
- Location: Nizhny Novgorod, Russia; 56°19′35″N 44°1′31″E
- Campus: urban
- Website: www.nntu.ru

University rankings

Regional – Overall
- QS Emerging Europe and Central Asia: 351-400 (2022)

Nizhny Novgorod State Technical University (Russian: Нижегородский государственный технический университет им. Р. Е. Алексеева, NNSTU) is a public technical university in Nizhny Novgorod, Russia, founded in 1917. The university was renamed in honour of a famous alumnus, engineer Rostislav Alexeyev, in 1992.

== History ==
The Imperial Russia's Emperor Nicolas II Warsaw Polytechnic Institute was established in 1898. Due to German Empire achievements on Eastern Front during World War I, the Emperor Nicolas II Warsaw Polytechnic Institute was evacuated and moved to Nizhny Novgorod, in 1915. It was renamed to Nizhny Novgorod University of Technology, and later (in 1918), incorporated into the State University of Nizhny Novgorod. The incorporated departments included agricultural courses, medical courses, and the Higher Pedagogical Institute. M. A. Bonch-Bruevich and others led the technical departments.

In 1930, the Mechanical Engineering Institute and the Institute of Chemical Technology were separated from the State University of Nizhny Novgorod. At the same time, new departments were created, including: the Institute of Construction, the Pedagogical Institute, the Institute of Agriculture, and the Institute of Medicine. Additional departments added in 1934 included the Institute of Mechanical Engineering, the Institute of Chemical Technology, and the Gorky Institute of Industry. Over the years 1950-1989 Andrei Zhdanov Gorky Polytechnic Institute.

The university was renamed to "the R. E. Alexeyev State Technical University of Nizhny Novgorod" in 1992.

== Notable faculty and alumni ==
- Rostislav Alexeyev — the inventor and designer of the world's first Ekranoplans.
- Alexey Sudayev — weapons designer who created the PPS submachine gun.
- Igor Shelushkov — mental calculator.
- Igor Afrikantov — former chief designer and director of OKBM Afrikantov.
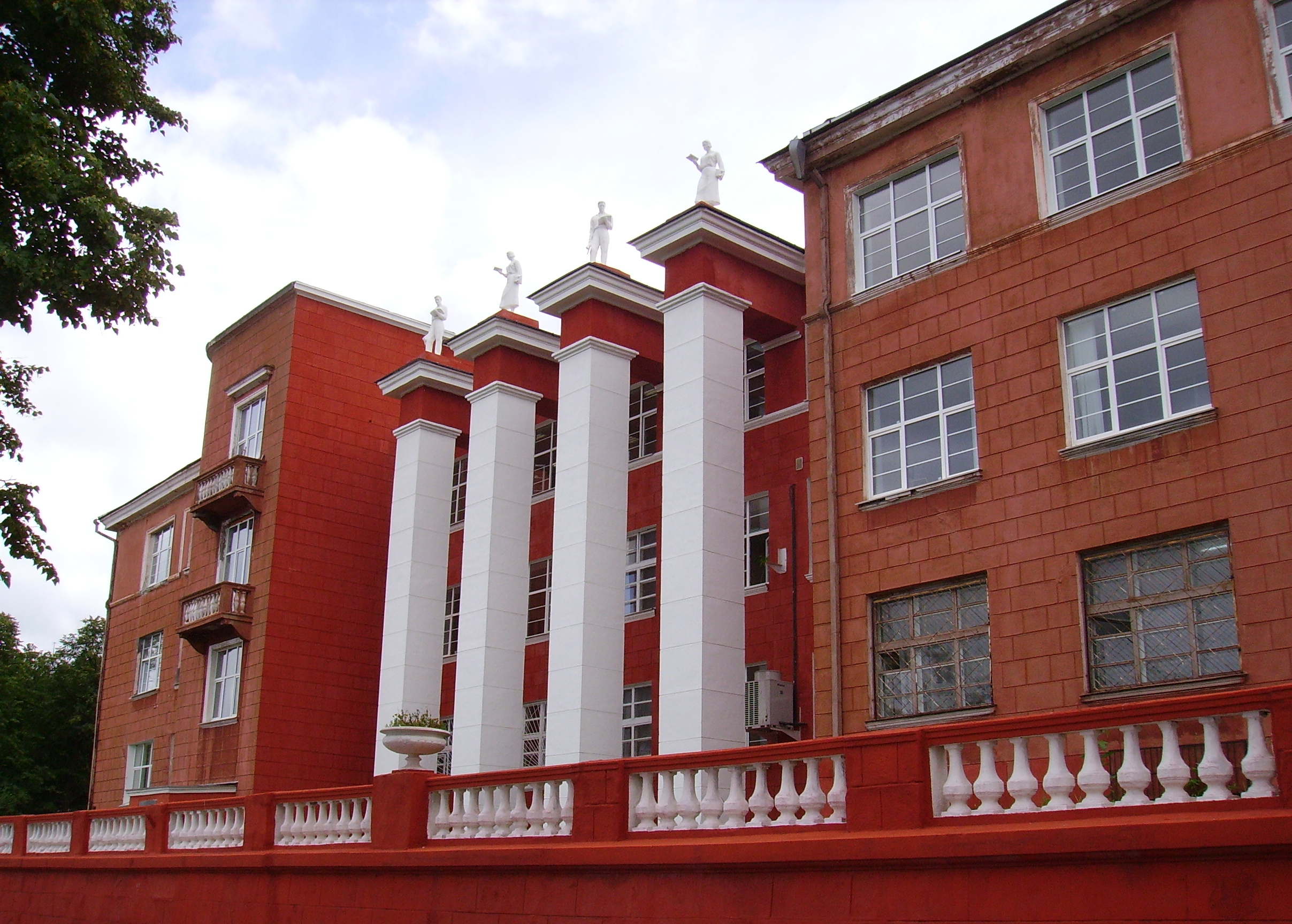
The main NNSTU building

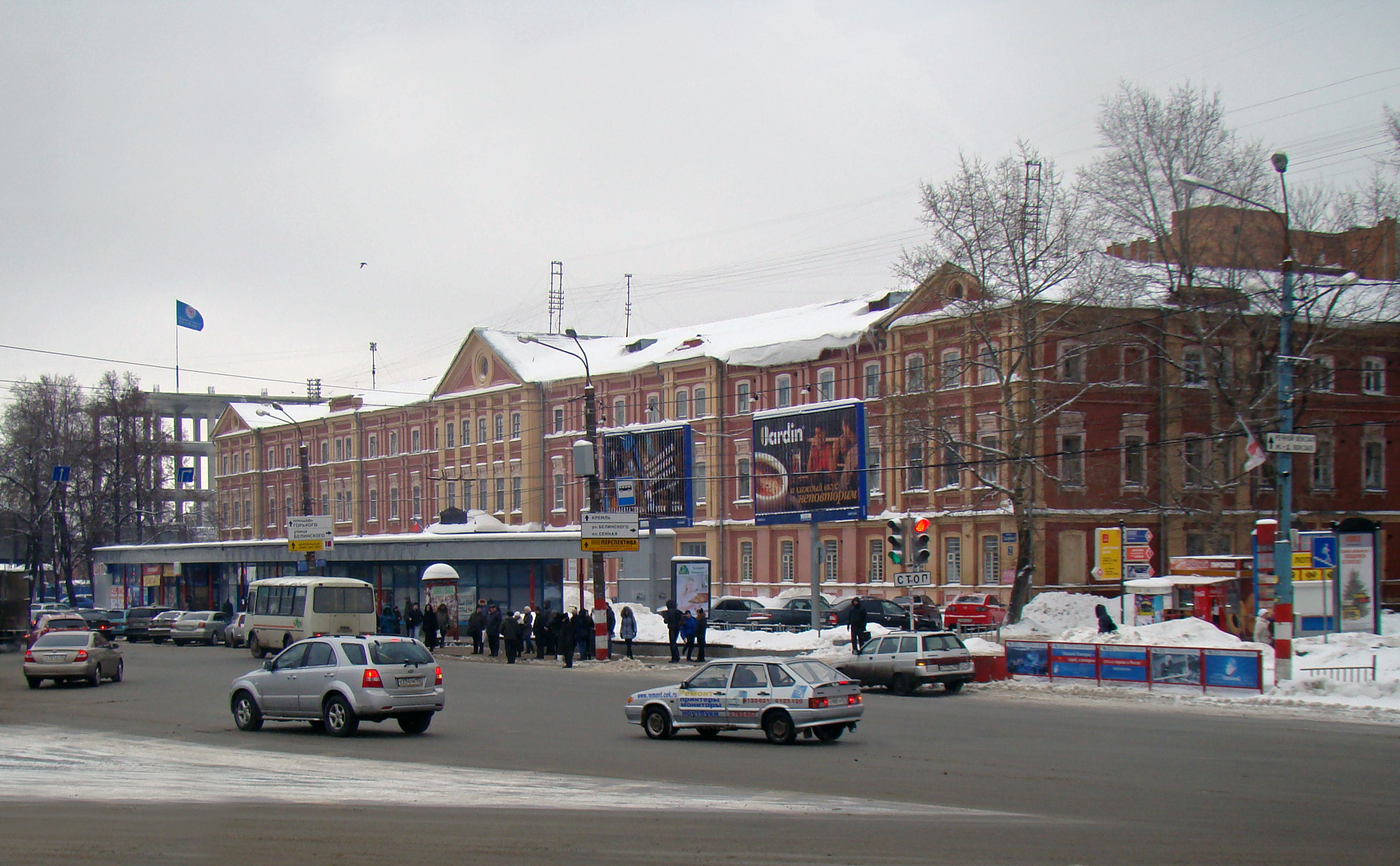
Dorm No. 2, formerly the Widows house of Bugrov

== See also ==
- Education in Russia
- List of universities in Russia
- Russian educational system
