= Lists of nuclear reactors =

This following is a list of articles listing nuclear reactors.

== By use ==
- List of commercial nuclear reactors
- List of inactive or decommissioned civil nuclear reactors
- List of nuclear power stations
- List of nuclear research reactors
- List of nuclear submarines – nuclear-powered submarines with nuclear reactors
  - List of sunken nuclear submarines
- List of nuclear-powered aircraft

== By type ==
- List of reactor types
- List of small modular reactor designs
- List of fusor examples – fusor-type nuclear fusion reactors
- List of fusion experiments

== By location ==
- List of nuclear power plants in Japan
- List of Russian small nuclear reactors
- List of cancelled nuclear reactors in Russia
- List of United States naval reactors
- List of cancelled nuclear reactors in the United States
- List of the largest nuclear power stations in the United States
- List of nuclear power systems in space

== See also ==
- List of power stations
