= Igor Shelushkov =

Soviet mental calculator

Igor Alexeyevich Shelushkov (born c. 1946 – ?) was a Soviet mental calculator. He mentally extracted roots of large numbers and calculated the number of syllables and characters in a given verse by listening. Shelushkov was featured in the 1968 Soviet popular science film Seven Steps Beyond the Horizon, where he mentally extracted the sixth root of a 12-digit number and the 77th root of another multi-digit number. Shelushkov also competed with the Soviet third generation computer Mir. He extracted the 77th root of a 148-digit number in 18 seconds, while it took about 10 minutes to program the related operation for computer.

Shelushkov was a postgraduate at Gorki Polytechnic Institute (now Nizhny Novgorod State Technical University). According to Shelushkov, he used the memorized logarithmic table for calculations. His abilities were mentioned by Russian mathematician Vladimir Tvorogov, who attended one of his performances, and by psychologist Artur Petrovsky. Shelushkov's subsequent fate is unclear.
