= Igor Afrikantov =

Russian engineer

- Born: 21 October [O.S. ] 1916; Pushkarka, Arzamas county, Nizhny Novgorod Governorate, Russian Empire
- Died: 19 July 1969 (aged 52); Nizhny Novgorod, RSFSR, USSR
- Education: Nizhny Novgorod State Technical University
- Engineering career
- Discipline: designer manager of building nuclear reactors
- Awards: Hero of Socialist Labor

Igor Ivanovich Afrikantov (Russian: Игорь Иванович Африкантов; 21 October 1916 – 19 July 1969) was a Soviet designer and manager in charge of building nuclear reactors and components for the Russian nuclear industry, civil fleet, and navy.

== Life and career ==
Igor Ivanovich Afrikantov was born in Pushkarka, a village in the Arzamas District of Gorky Oblast, Russia. He attended secondary school in Gorky from 1924 to 1934 and attended Gorky Polytechnic Institute from 1934 to 1938, receiving his degree as a shipbuilder and heat engineer.

From 1939 to 1942 - Head of the Design Bureau of the Stalingrad Shipyard (Plant No. 246).

Since 1942 he worked in the city of Gorky at the plant number 92 (Gorky Machine-Building Plant - GMZ):

- 1942-1951 - head of the department, deputy head of the workshop, head of the tool shop, deputy chief technologist, deputy chief of the Special Design Bureau for Experimental Works, deputy chief - chief designer of the OKBM Afrikantov;
- 1951-1954 - Chief Designer of the Design Bureau;
- 1954-1964 - Chief and Chief Designer of Design Bureau;
- 1964-1969 - Chief and Chief Designer OKBM Afrikantov.

In 1953 he was awarded the Stalin Prize for the development and commissioning of the diffusion plants that provided the production of highly enriched uranium, and in 1958, the Lenin Prize.

II Afrikantov supervised the design of 9 industrial uranium-graphite reactors and 5 heavy water reactors. He headed the work of OKBM to design and master the production of the world's first fast neutron power reactor with sodium coolant BN-350 and BN-600.

== Memorial ==
In 1998, Igor Afrikantov's name was used to name the Federal State Unitary Enterprise with full name "Experimental Design Bureau of Mechanical Engineering named after I. I. Afrikantov". It is now known as the Federal Research and Production Center for Nuclear Engineering OKBM Afrikantov.

== Awards and titles ==
In 1960 he was awarded the Hero of Socialist Labor. He was also awarded the Order of Lenin (in 1951, 1959, and 1960), the Order of the Red Banner of Labor (1954), the Order of the Red Star (1945), the Order of the Badge of Honor (1944) and the Medal "For Valiant Labour in the Great Patriotic War 1941–1945".
