= Gas turbine modular helium reactor =

US/Russian design concept ~1997 - never built

The Gas Turbine Modular Helium Reactor (GT-MHR) was a nuclear reactor design that was under development by a group of Russian enterprises (OKBM Afrikantov, Kurchatov Institute, VNIINM and others), an American group headed by General Atomics, French Framatome, and Japanese Fuji Electric. It is a helium-cooled, graphite-moderated reactor and uses TRISO fuel compacts in a prismatic core design. The power is generated via a gas turbine rather than via the more common steam turbine.

A conceptual design was produced by 1997, and it was hoped to have a final design by 2005, and a prototype plant commissioning by 2010.

== Construction ==
The core consists of a graphite cylinder with a radius of 4 metres (13 ft) and a height of 10 metres (33 ft) which includes 1 metre (3 ft 3 in) axial reflectors at top and bottom. The cylinder allocates three or four concentric rings, each of 36 hexagonal blocks with an interstitial gap of 0.2 centimetres (0.079 in). Each hexagonal block contains 108 helium coolant channels and 216 fuel pins. Each fuel pin contains a random lattice of TRISO particles dispersed into a graphite matrix. The reactor exhibits a thermal spectrum with a peak neutron energy located at about 0.2 eV. The TRISO fuel concept allows the reactor to be inherently safe. The reactor and containment structure is located below grade and in contact with the ground, which serves as a passive safety measure to conduct heat away from the reactor in the event of a coolant failure.

== Advantages ==
The Gas Turbine Modular Helium Reactor utilizes the Brayton cycle turbine arrangement, which gives it an efficiency of up to 48% – higher than any other reactor, as of 1995. Commercial light water reactors (LWRs) generally use the Rankine cycle, which is what coal-fired power plants use. Commercial LWRs average 32% efficiency, again as of 1995.

== Legacy ==
=== Energy Multiplier Module (EM2) ===
In 2010 General Atomics conceptualized a new reactor that utilizes the power conversion features of the GT-MHR, the Energy Multiplier Module (EM2). The EM2 uses fast neutrons and is a gas-cooled fast reactor, enabling it to reduce nuclear waste considerably by transmutation.

== See also ==
- Gas-cooled fast reactor
- Pebble bed reactor
- Very high temperature reactor
