= KN-3 reactor =

Nuclear reactor

The KN-3 reactor (VM-16) is the nuclear reactor used in pairs to power the Kirov-class battlecruisers. The reactor was also intended to be used on the Ulyanovsk class of supercarriers. It is a pressurized water reactor (PWR), using enriched uranium-235 fuel to produce 300 MW of power.

It was developed by OKBM Afrikantov.
