= VBER-300 =

The VBER-300 is a proposed Russian pressurized water reactor of 325-MWe generating capacity designed for remote locations. The exterior containment structure is 16 meters high and the working section, built with transportable modules, weighs 1300 tonnes. The external steam plant can have a 917 MW thermal-steam only capacity, or 325 MW steam-turbine-electrical capacity, or a mixture of capacities relating to the four primary steam loops.

In particular, it has been proposed in a more powerful sister ship to the Akademik Lomonosov (2010) for possible use on the Russian floating nuclear power station (two reactors on a 49,000-tonne barge). The reactor could be used on a 200–500 MW barge that is expected to be completed by 2030.

The reactor has been proposed for use in water desalination, district heating and/or electrical generation.

The VBER-300 would use VVER-type fuel. It was developed by OKBM Afrikantov in cooperation with Kurchatov Institute.

== See also ==
- Nuclear power
