= Russian floating nuclear power station =

Type of ship

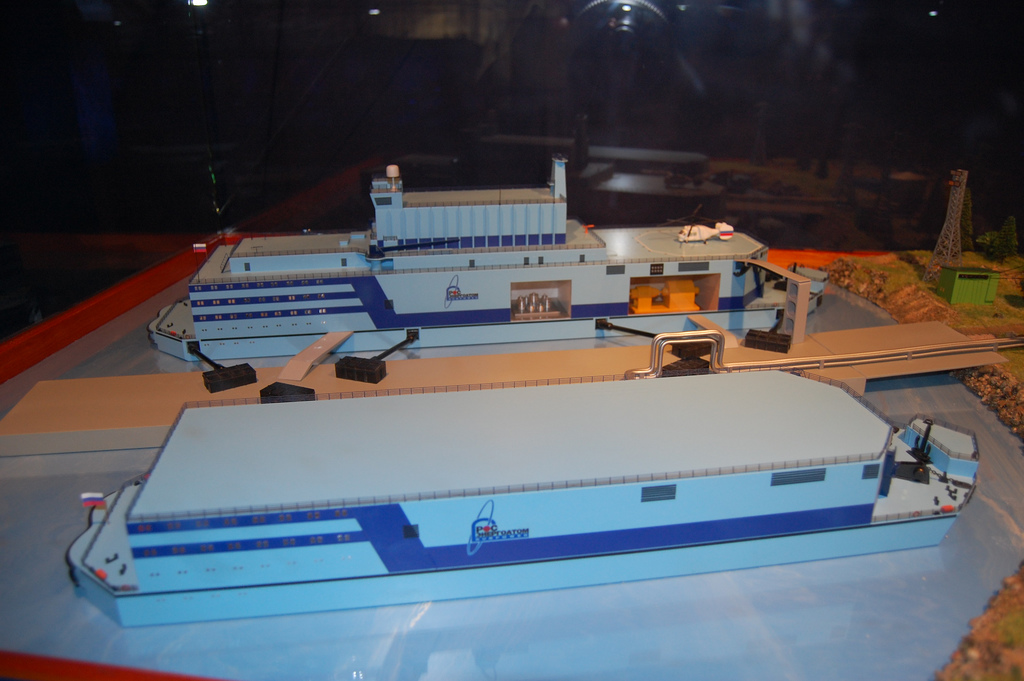
- Model of the Project 20870 (back) with a desalination unit (front)

Class overview
- Builders: Baltic Shipyard
- Operators: Rosatom
- Built: 2007-2018
- In service: 19 December 2019-present
- Planned: at least 7
- Building: 3
- Completed: 1
- Active: 1

General characteristics
- Type: Nuclear power station barge
- Displacement: 21,500 tonnes
- Length: 144.4 m (474 ft)
- Beam: 30 m (98 ft)
- Height: 10 m (33 ft)
- Draught: 5.6 m (18 ft)
- Propulsion: none
- Crew: 69
- Notes: 2 modified KLT-40S nuclear reactors (icebreaker type) producing 70 MW electric or 300 MW heat power

Floating nuclear power stations (Russian: плавучая атомная теплоэлектростанция малой мощности, ПАТЭС ММ, lit. 'floating combined heat and power (CHP) low-power nuclear power plant') are vessels designed by Rosatom, the Russian state-owned nuclear energy corporation. They are self-contained, low-capacity, floating nuclear power plants. Rosatom plans to mass-produce the stations at shipbuilding facilities and then tow them to ports near locations that require electricity.

The work on such a concept dates back to the MH-1A in the United States, which was built in the 1960s into the hull of a World War II Liberty Ship, which was followed on much later in 2022 when the United States Department of Energy funded a three-year research study of offshore floating nuclear power generation. The Rosatom project is the first floating nuclear power plant intended for mass production. The initial plan was to manufacture at least seven of the vessels by 2015. On 14 September 2019, Russia’s first-floating nuclear power plant, Akademik Lomonosov, arrived to its permanent location in the Chukotka region. It started operation on 19 December 2019.

== History ==
The project for a floating nuclear power station began in 2000, when the Ministry for Atomic Energy of the Russian Federation (Rosatom) chose Severodvinsk in Arkhangelsk Oblast as the construction site, Sevmash was appointed as general contractor. Construction of the first power station, the Akademik Lomonosov, started on 15 April 2007 at the Sevmash Submarine-Building Plant in Severodvinsk. In August 2008 construction works were transferred to the Baltic Shipyard in Saint Petersburg, which is also responsible for the construction of future vessels. Akademik Lomonosov was launched on 1 July 2010, at an estimated cost of 6 billion rubles (232 m$). In 2015 construction of a second vessel starting in 2019 was announced by Russia's state nuclear corporation Rosatom.

On 27 July 2021 Rosatom signed an agreement with GDK Baimskaya LLC for energy delivery for Baimskaya copper mining operations. Rosatom suggests delivering up to three new floating power plants (with fourth being in reserve), all using the latest RITM-200M 55 MWe reactors, currently serving on Project 22220 icebreakers. These are to be docked at Cape Nagloynyn, Chaunskaya Bay port and connected to the Baimskaya mine by 400 km long 110 kV line through Bilibino. According to Rosatom, production of the first new reactors by Atomenergomash has already started. In August 2022, construction of the first hull started in China, planned to be delivered to Russia in 2023 for installation of reactors and equipment.

On 31 December 2021 Rosatom announced that these four new floating plants will carry a new, slightly improved version of RITM-200 cores, named RITM-200S, currently in development. TVEL has been charged with development of new fuel assemblies for its improved core. Each barge will produce 106 MWe of power.

== Technical characteristics ==
The floating nuclear power station is a non-self propelled vessel. It has length of 144.4 metres (474 ft), width of 30 metres (98 ft), height of 10 metres (33 ft), and draught of 5.6 metres (18 ft). The vessel has a displacement of 21,500 tonnes and a crew of 69 people.

Each vessel of this type has two modified KLT-40 naval propulsion reactors together providing up to 70 MW of electricity or 300 MW of heat, or cogeneration of electricity and heat for district heating, enough for a city with a population of 200,000 people. Because of its ability to float and be assembled in extreme weather conditions, it can provide heat and power to areas that do not have easy access to these amenities because of their geographic location. It could also be modified as a desalination plant producing 240,000 m^{3} (8,500,000 cu ft) of fresh water a day. Smaller modification of the plant can be fitted with two ABV-6M reactors with the electrical power around 18 MWe (megawatts of electricity).

The much larger VBER-300 917 MW thermal or 325 MWe and the slightly larger RITM-200 55 MWe reactors have both been considered as a potential energy source for these floating nuclear power stations. The station also incorporates a floating unit (FPU), waterworks, guaranteeing solid establishment, separation FPU and transmitting created power and heat on the banks, inland offices for accepting and transmitting the produced power to outside systems for circulation to purchasers.

== Objectives ==
The primary goal of the venture is to give increasing energy needs of the area, effective energy investigation and advancement of gold and rest of the different fields in Chaun-Bilibino energy arrangement of the industrial group, guaranteeing adjustment of taxes for electric and heat energy for the populace and modern customers, and the making of a solid energy base for monetary and social improvement of the locale.

== Contractors ==
The hull and sections of vessels are built by the Baltic Shipyard in Saint Petersburg and Wison (Nantong) Heavy Industry in China. Reactors are designed by OKBM Afrikantov and assembled by Nizhniy Novgorod Research and Development Institute Atomenergoproekt (both part of Atomenergoprom). The reactor vessels are produced by Izhorskiye Zavody. Kaluga Turbine Plant supplies the turbo-generators.

== Fueling ==
The floating power stations need to be refueled every three years while saving up to 200,000 metric tons of coal and 100,000 tons of fuel oil a year. The reactors are supposed to have a lifespan of 40 years. Every 12 years, the whole plant will be towed home and overhauled at the wharf where it was constructed. The manufacturer will arrange for the disposal of the nuclear waste and maintenance is provided by the infrastructure of the Russian nuclear industry. Thus, virtually no radiation traces are expected at the place where the power station produced its energy.

== Safety ==
The safety systems of the KLT-40S are designed according to the reactor design itself, physical successive systems of protection and containment, self-activating active and passive safety systems, self-diagnostic automatic systems, reliable diagnostics relating to equipment and systems status, and provisioned methods regarding accident control. Additionally, the safety systems on board operate independently of the plant’s power supply.

Environmental groups and citizens are concerned that floating plants will be more vulnerable to accidents, natural disasters specific to oceans, and terrorism than land-based stations. They point to a history of naval and nuclear accidents in Russia and the former Soviet Union, including the Chernobyl disaster of 1986. Russia does have 50 years of experience operating a fleet of nuclear-powered icebreakers that are also used for scientific and Arctic tourism expeditions. However earlier incidents (Lenin, 1957, and Taymyr, 2011) involving radioactive leaking from such vessels also contribute to safety concerns for FNPPs. Commercialization of floating nuclear power plants in the United States have failed due to high costs and safety concerns.

Environmental concerns around the health and safety of the project have arisen. Radioactive steam may be produced, negatively impacting people living nearby. Earthquake activity is common in the area and there are fears that a tsunami wave could damage the facility and release radioactive substances and waste. Being on the water exposes it to natural forces, according to environmental groups.

== Environmental impacts ==
Both coastal and floating nuclear powerplants may result in similar consequences for the ocean environments. Although the surrounding seawall could provide an artificial reef that is an advantageous environment for some marine life forms, there are potential negative effects on animal and plant life near-shore (for coastal plants) or further offshore (with deep-water floating plants). Intrusion of marine organisms into power station systems during water entrainment could reduce species variety and number of individual organisms. The thermal impact of water discharge from stations may permanently change the area's marine ecosystem, with, for example, cooler-water species unable to maintain populations, and non-local, warmer-water species, colonizing the vicinity. While power plants may instigate such environmental transformations, the thermal plumes caused by the warmed-water discharge are narrow, so their effect is geographically restricted. Winter shutdown of the plant may result in fish kills from the thermal shock. However, this can be mitigated in stations with multiple units, by avoiding simultaneous shutdowns. By sequentially turning off only one unit at a time, the water temperature variation is minimized. These problems are shared by all thermal power plants.

The breakwater will constitute an artificial island of appreciable size.

== Locations ==
Floating nuclear power stations are planned to be used mainly in the Russian Arctic. Five of these are planned to be used by Gazprom for offshore oil and gas field development and for operations on the Kola and Yamal peninsulas. Other locations include Dudinka on the Taymyr Peninsula, Vilyuchinsk on the Kamchatka Peninsula and Pevek on the Chukchi Peninsula. In 2007, Rosatom signed an agreement with the Sakha Republic to build a floating plant for its northern parts, using smaller ABV reactors.

According to Rosatom, 15 countries, including China, Indonesia, Malaysia, Algeria, Sudan, Namibia, Cape Verde, and Argentina, have shown interest in hiring such a device. It has been estimated that 75% of the world's population live within 100 miles of a port city.

== See also ==
- Atlantic Nuclear Power Plant
- Nuclear marine propulsion
- Offshore Power Systems
- Soviet naval reactors
