= Kaluga Turbine Plant =

Coordinates: 54°32′35″N 36°16′30″E

Kaluga Turbine Plant (Russian: Калужский турбинный завод) is a company based in Kaluga, Russia and established in 1946. The Kaluga Turbine Plant Production Association produces turbines for naval ships and submarines. It also produces turbines for civilian power plants. It is located near the Kaluga Motor-Building Plant.

== Awards ==
In 2015, for its significant contribution to the development of the economic, social, and industrial potential of Kaluga Oblast and to strengthening Russia's defense capabilities, the enterprise was awarded the honorary title "Labor Glory of Kaluga Oblast".

In 2016, for many years of diligent work and a substantial contribution to the development of the regional economy, the enterprise and its staff were awarded the jubilee medal of Kaluga Oblast "70 Years of Kaluga Oblast".
