= Akademik Lomonosov =

Russian floating nuclear power plant

Coordinates: 69°42′35″N 170°18′22″E

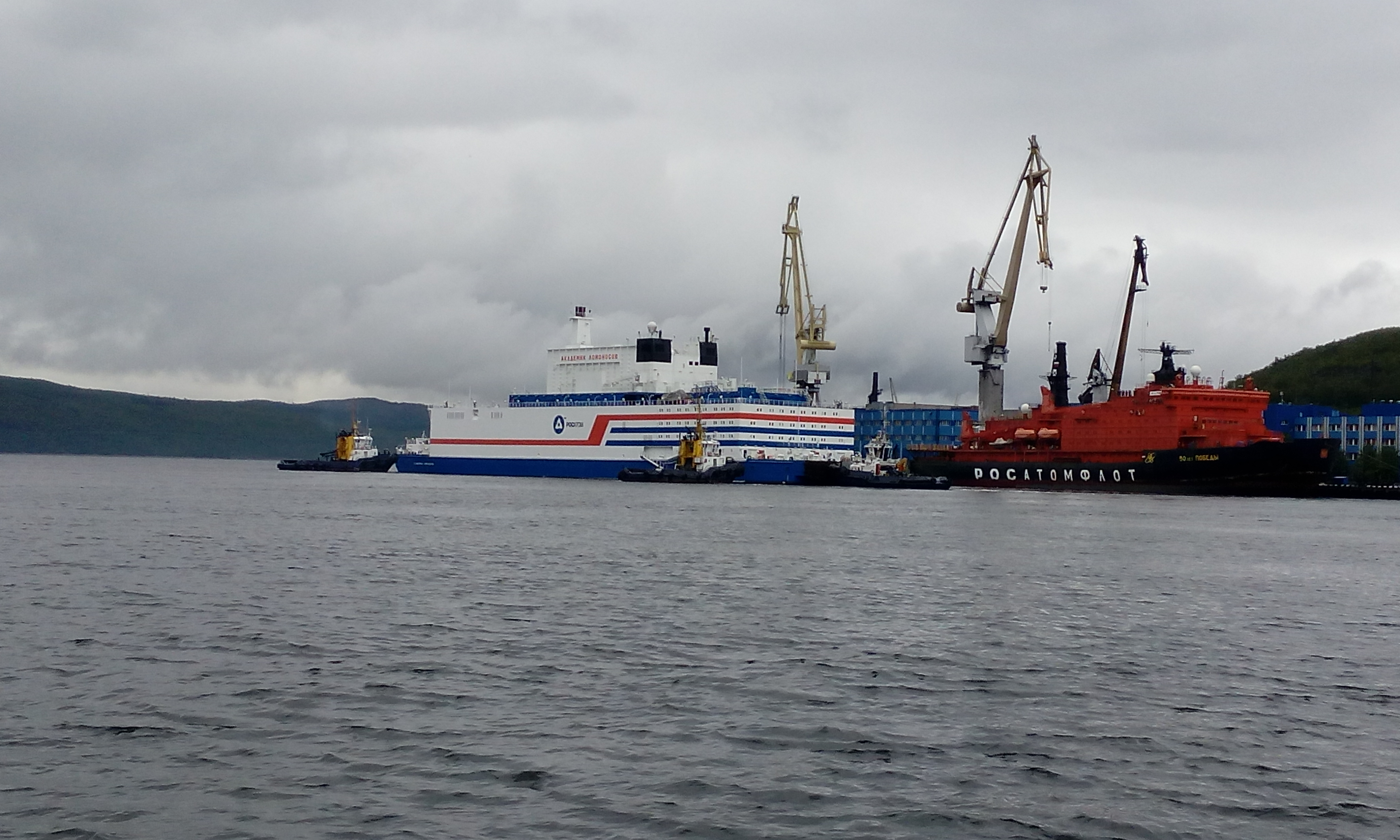
- Akademik Lomonosov being transported from Murmansk, August 2019

History
- Name: Akademik Lomonosov
- Namesake: Mikhail Lomonosov
- Owner: Rosatom
- Port of registry: 2019 onwards: Saint Petersburg, Russia
- Builder: Sevmash (2007–2008); Baltic Shipyard (2008–2010)
- Cost: 37.3 billion rubles (2015) (414 million dollars in 2024)
- Yard number: 05710
- Laid down: 15 April 2007
- Launched: 30 June 2010
- Completed: 2018
- Acquired: 4 July 2019
- In service: 22 May 2020
- Identification: Callsign: UAII5; MMSI number: 273381660
- Status: In service

General characteristics
- Class & type: nuclear powership (barge)
- Displacement: 21,500 tonnes
- Length: 144.4 m (474 ft)
- Beam: 30 m (98 ft)
- Height: 10 m (33 ft)
- Draft: 5.6 m (18 ft)
- Crew: 69
- Notes: 2 modified KLT-40S nuclear reactors (icebreaker type) producing 35x2 MW electric or 150x2 MW thermal

Akademik Lomonosov (Russian: Академик Ломоносов) is a non-self-propelled power barge that operates as the first Russian floating nuclear power station. The ship was named after academician Mikhail Lomonosov. It is docked in the Pevek harbour, providing heat to the town and supplying electricity to the regional Chaun-Bilibino power system. It is the world’s northernmost nuclear power plant.

== History ==
Construction started at the Sevmash Submarine-Building Plant in Severodvinsk. The keel of Akademik Lomonosov was laid on 15 April 2007 and completion was initially planned in May 2010. The celebrations were attended by the first deputy prime minister of Russia, Sergei Ivanov, and by the head of Rosatom, Sergei Kiriyenko.

In August 2008, the Russian government approved the transfer of work from Sevmash to the Baltic Shipyard (Baltiysky Zavod) in Saint Petersburg. A second keel-laying was done at the new shipyard in May 2009. Akademik Lomonosov was launched on 30 June 2010. The first reactor, a KLT-40S design by OKBM Afrikantov, was delivered in May 2009 and the second one in August 2009 by AtomEnergoProekt (NN-AEP). They were installed in October 2013.

Originally, Akademik Lomonosov was supposed to supply power to the Sevmash shipyard itself and the town of Severodvinsk, located in Arkhangelsk Oblast in Northwest Russia. It was decided later to deploy the power barge at Pevek, in the Chukotka region in Russia's Far East. It was expected to be delivered in 2019, and to replace the nearby Bilibino Nuclear Power Plant, which was at the end of its service life.

On 28 April 2018, it left St. Petersburg under tow for Murmansk, where it received nuclear fuel for the first time. On 17 May 2018, it arrived at Murmansk. The Akademik Lomonosov power station was handed over to the Russian state nuclear power company on 4 July 2019. The 5,000 km (3100 mi) towing operation through the Arctic Ocean by icebreaker Dikson began on 23 August 2019.

On 9 September 2019, it arrived at its permanent location in the Chukotka district, the far eastern end of the Far East region. It started operation on 19 December 2019. On 22 May 2020, the plant had been fully commissioned. By that date it had delivered 47.3 GWh of zero-emissions electric energy, covering 20% of demand in the region. On 30 June 2020 it started to supply thermal power to Pevek. By January 2025, the plant had delivered 1000 GWh, providing 60% of the energy for the region.

Initially, estimated costs were 6 billion rubles ($232 million). Calculations in 2015 totalled 37 billion rubles ($700 million), including infrastructure reinforcements in Pevek.

== Description ==
Akademik Lomonosov has a length of 144 metres (472 ft) and width of 30 metres (98 ft). It has a displacement of 21,500 tonnes and a crew of 69 people. It will have a crew of about 300 people. For power generation, it has two KLT-40S reactors, derived from icebreaker propulsion reactors, which together provide thermal reactor power of 300 MW, which is transformed in two turbo-generating sets into 70 MW of electricity (gross).

The reactors use low-enriched uranium (LEU) fuel, with 14.1% average enrichment, with a fuel cycle of 3 years. The Akademik Lomonosov can work as cogeneration plant, as waste heat is collected. It can provide up to 60 MW thermal power via clamped pipelines for heating purposes. Peak heat delivery is up to 170 MW while reducing the electric output to 30 MW (cf. extraction steam turbine). Another joint product is up to 240,000 m^{3}/d freshwater made from seawater.

The reactors were designed by OKBM Afrikantov and assembled by Nizhniy Novgorod Research and Development Institute Atomenergoproekt, both part of Atomenergoprom. The reactor vessels were produced by Izhorskiye Zavody. The turbo-generators were supplied by Kaluga Turbine Plant.

Unit	type & model	el. power (net)	el. power (gross)	thermal power	construction start	first grid connection	commercial operation	references
Akademik Lomonosov 1	PWR / KLT-40S	32 MW	35 MW	150 MW	2007-04-15	2019-12-19	2020-05-22	
Akademik Lomonosov 2	PWR / KLT-40S	32 MW	35 MW	150 MW	2007-04-15	2019-12-19	2020-05-22	

== Safety features ==
Rosatom states that the PWR reactor technology used in the power plant has nothing in common with the old RBMK reactor design in Chernobyl and is designed to shut down automatically without external power and human intervention in case of emergency. The design incorporates all the state-of-the-art safeguards as documented in IAEA INSAG-3 recommendation and Russian civilian reactors had not a single accident leading to a radioactive leak in 34 years.
