= KLT-40 reactor =

Nuclear fission reactor family

The KLT-40 family are nuclear fission reactors originating from OK-150 and OK-900 ship reactors. KLT-40 were developed to power the Taymyr-class icebreakers (KLT-40M, 171 MW) and the LASH carrier Sevmorput (KLT-40, 135 MW). They are pressurized water reactors (PWR) fueled by either 30–40% or 90% (Note: 90 % according to information provided to Norwegian government in 1990, 30–40 % according to Bellona Foundation citing communication with Murmansk Shipping Company. (Diakov, Anatoli C. et al.)) enriched uranium-235 fuel to produce 135 to 171 MW of thermal power.

The KLT-40S variant is used in the Russian floating nuclear power station Akademik Lomonosov. It was developed by OKBM Afrikantov and produced by NMZ. The KLT-40S produces 150 MW thermal (about 52 MWe at 35% efficiency). It uses low-enriched uranium (LEU) fuel enriched below 20%, averaging at 14.1% enrichment, and has a fuel cycle of 3 years.

The KLT-40 design was further improved and evolved into RITM-200 family of SMR.
