= OKBM Afrikantov =

Nuclear engineering company in Nizhny Novgorod, Russia

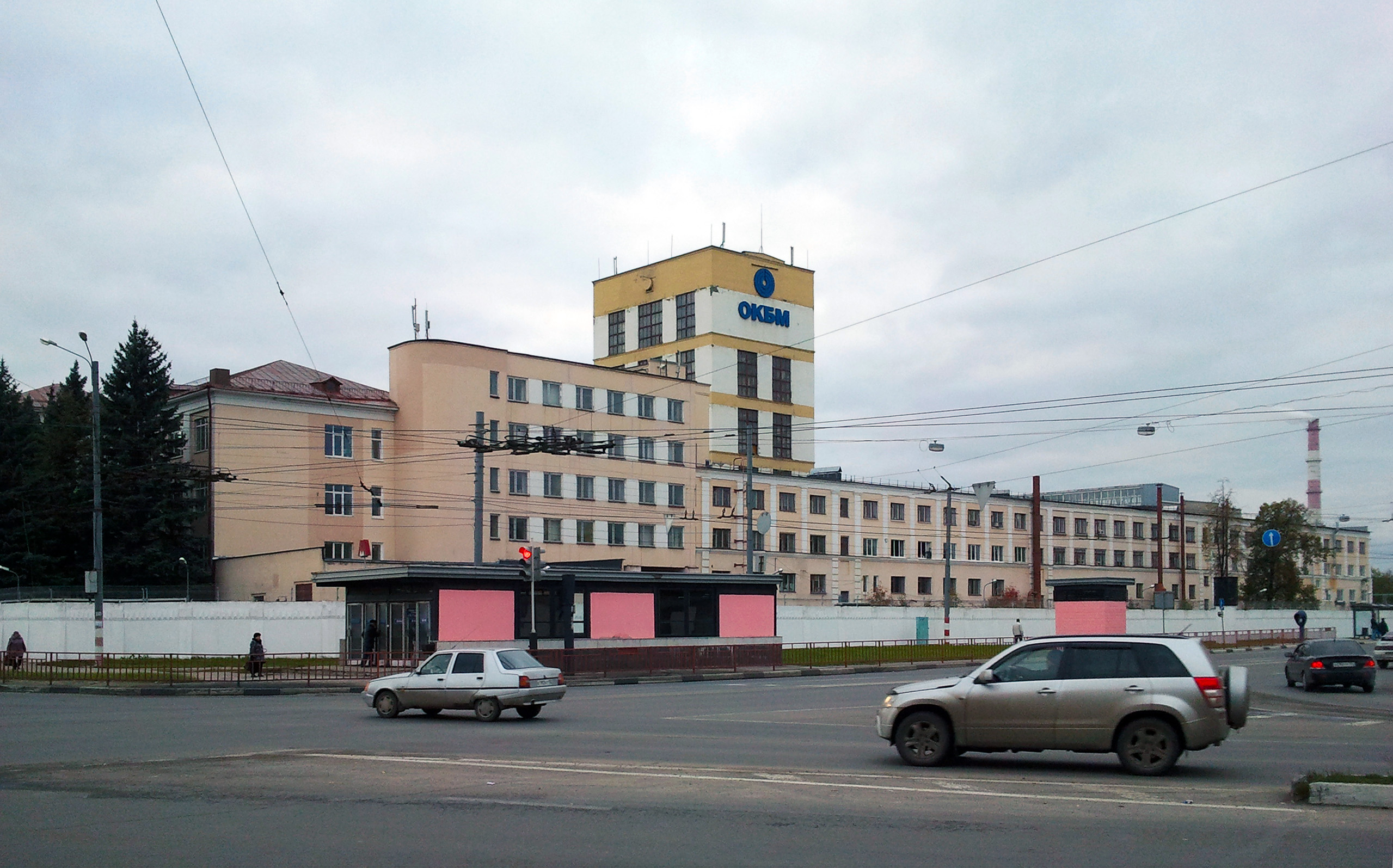
- Industry: Nuclear engineering
- Number of employees: 4,000
- Parent: Rosatom
- Website: www.okbm.nnov.ru

OKBM Afrikantov (full name: OAO I. I. Afrikantov OKB Mechanical Engineering, Russian: Опытное конструкторское бюро машиностроения им. И. И. Африкантова, romanized: Opytnoye konstruktorskoye byuro mashinostroyeniya im. I. I. Afrikantova, lit. 'I. I. Afrikantov Experimental Design Bureau of Mechanical Engineering') is a nuclear engineering company located in Nizhny Novgorod, Russia. It is a subsidiary of Rosatom.

The company is named after Igor Afrikantov, and is best known as the main designer for the Soviet Union's and Russia's flagship nuclear propulsion projects, including reactors for nuclear submarines, nuclear-powered icebreakers, and the floating nuclear power plant project. It also designs fast breeder reactors.

Nearly 4,000 people work for OKBM, including more than 1,600 design engineers, production engineers and test engineers. The company's employees include one Academician of the Russian Academy of Science, 20 Doctors of Engineering Science and 92 Candidates of Engineering Science. Throughout the years in action, OKBM has made a great contribution to the development of the Russian nuclear industry, the energy sector and the fleet.

== History ==
The company was founded in 1945, by the decree of the Council of People's Commissars of the USSR dated December 27, 1945, a Special Design Bureau (OKB) was established on the basis of the Nizhny Novgorod Machine-building Plant to create equipment for the nuclear industry.

In 1960, the OKB was awarded the highest state award, the Order of Lenin, for its participation in the creation of the power plant of the first nuclear icebreaker: Lenin.

In 1985, the OKB was awarded the Order of the October Revolution for its significant contribution to the development of nuclear technology.

In 1998 the enterprise was named after its former chief designer and director I. I. Afrikantov.

In 2004, by a decree of the Government of the Russian Federation, OKBM was granted the status of a Federal Scientific and Production Center.

In 2008, the open joint-stock company “Experimental Design Bureau of Mechanical Engineering named after I. I. Afrikantov” was registered. The company was created as a result of the transformation of the federal state's unitary enterprise “Experimental Design Bureau of Mechanical Engineering named after I. I. Afrikantov” and became its legal successor.

In 2014, the company changed its name to a joint-stock company, as JSC Afrikantov OKBM.

== Products ==
The company is a developer of the nuclear reactors. It has designed and assembled KLT-40S reactors for the first Russian floating nuclear power station Akademik Lomonosov. It also developed the RITM-200 design pressurized water reactor which is used for LK-60 model nuclear-powered icebreaker.

OKBM Afrikantov also participated in the construction of China Experimental Fast Reactor.

=== Naval reactors ===
The company has been the primary designer of naval reactors for both military and civilian uses: KN-3 reactor, OK-150 reactor, OK-550 reactor, OK-650 reactor, KLT-40 reactor, RITM-200, RITM-400, ABV Reactor, VBER-300 and more.

=== Military-related reactors ===
Several reactors located on three secret cities were designed by the company to produce plutonium for nuclear weapons: AV Reactor, OK-180 reactor, OK-190 reactor, OK-190M reactor, LF-2 “Ludmila” Reactor, AD Reactor, ADE-1 Reactor, ADE-2 Reactor, ADE-3 Reactor, ADE-4 Reactor, ADE-5 Reactor.

== List of reactors ==
A list of some reactors under the company's flagship or participation:

Name	Power (in MW_{e})	Technology	Producer	Status
ABV	3-10	PWR	OKBM Afrikantov & IPPE	Detailed Design
KN-3	300	PWR	OKBM Afrikantov & IPPE	Operating
OK-150	90	PWR	OKBM Afrikantov	Retired
OK-550	155	LMFR	OKBM Afrikantov	Retired
OK-650	190	PWR	OKBM Afrikantov	Operating
OK-900	171	PWR	OKBM Afrikantov	Operating
KLT-20	20	PWR	OKBM Afrikantov	Conceptual Design
KLT-40	35	PWR	OKBM Afrikantov	Operating
VBER-300	325	PWR	OKBM Afrikantov	Licensing Stage
VBER-150	110	PWR	OKBM Afrikantov	Conceptual Design
BN GT-300	300	SFR	OKBM, IPPE & SPb AEP	Conceptual Design
BMN-170	170	SFR	OKBM, IPPE & SPb AEP	Conceptual Design
RITM-200	50	PWR	OKBM Afrikantov	Operating
GT-MHR	285	HTGR	OKBM Afrikantov	Conceptual Design Completed
MHR-T	4х205.5	HTGR	OKBM Afrikantov	Conceptual Design
MHR-100	25 - 87	HTGR	OKBM Afrikantov	Conceptual Design
IRIS	335	PWR	OKBM (participant)	Basic Design
CEFR	20	LMFR	OKBM (participant)	Operating
MBUR-12	12	SFR	OKBM & IPPE	Early Conceptual Design
SAKHA-92	1	PWR	OKBM	Conceptual Design
BN-600	600	SFR	OKBM	Operating
BN-800	800	SFR	OKBM	Operating
BN-1200	1200	SFR	OKBM	Under Development
