= Peaceful Atom (Volgodonsk) =

Peaceful atom
- Russian: Мирный атом
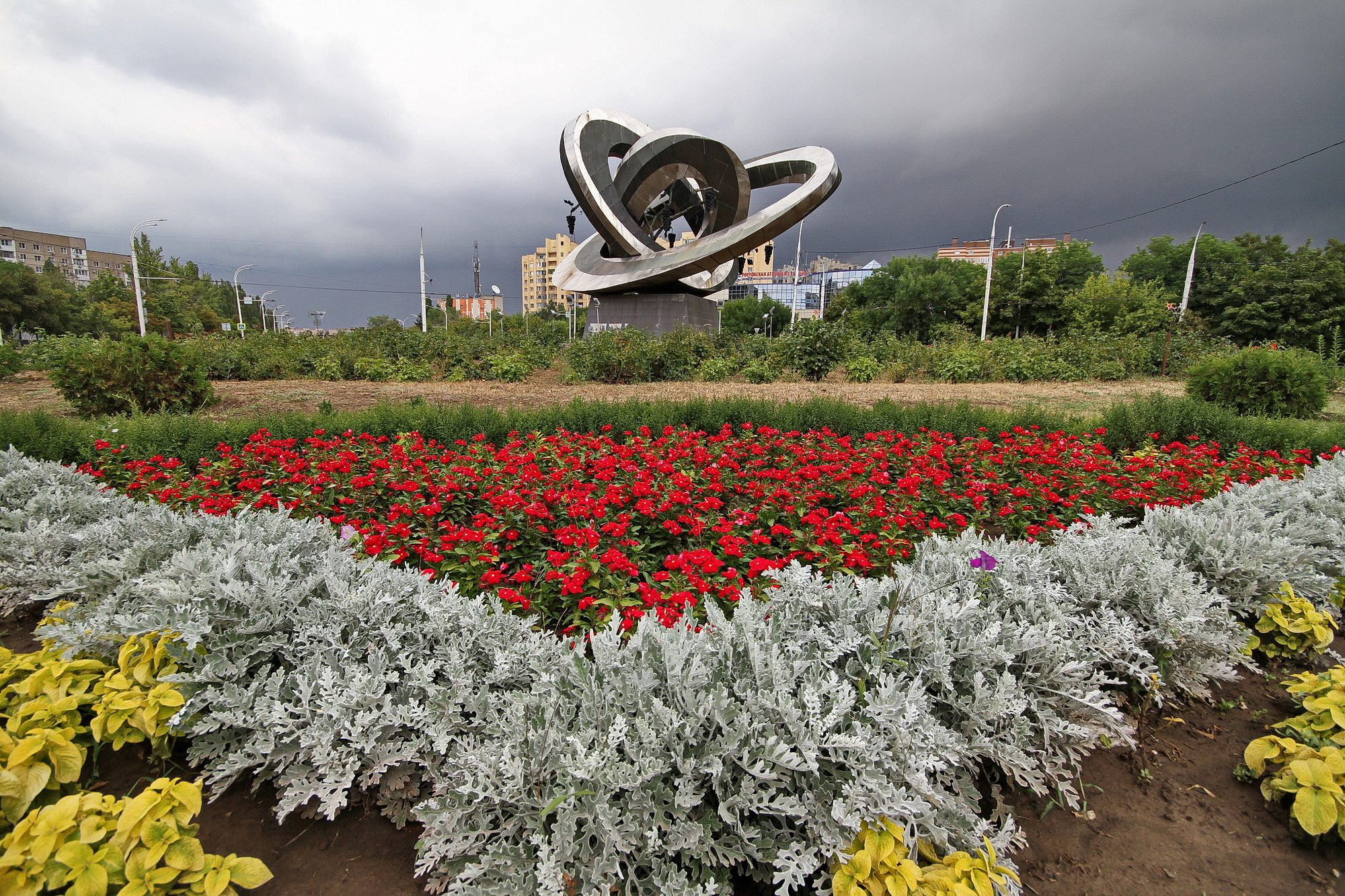
- Current state (2010)
- Interactive map of Peaceful atom
- Location: Kurchatova ave in Volgodonsk, Russia
- Coordinates: 47°31′12″N 42°12′16″E
- Designer: Yuri Alexandrov
- Type: Monument
- Material: Brass, stainless steel
- Opening date: 1981
- Location in Russia

Peaceful Atom (Russian: Мирный атом) is a brass monument, which symbolizes the development of the nuclear industry and energy in Volgodonsk, Rostov Oblast, Russia. It is one of the famous symbols of the city. It was designed by sculptor Yuri Alexandrov. The monument was opened at the square front of Volgodonsk Airport in Tsimlyansk in 1981. However a few months later Peaceful Atom was transferred because the Chairman of the executive committee, M. Ivanitskiy, considered that the monument was too big compared with the airport terminal square and the airport building. A new place had been determined in the middle of the roundabout. It is now located at the intersection of Kurchatova and Stroiteley avenue.

== Description ==
Stylized electron orbits braided by the grapevine are main elements of the construction. Bunches of grapes on the monument symbolize winemaking in Tsimlyansk. The city is famous for its grapes and wine, which received prizes at numerous exhibitions. The pedestal has sloped lateral walls. The form of the pedestal had something in common with lateral walls of the airport building and the architecture of the control tower on the original draft. The sketch of the sculpture composition presented by Yuri Alexandrov was confirmed by the Volgodonsk creative group without delay. This creative group engaged in the development of a concept for decoration and architecture in the city. Atommash received the order for manufacture of parts (frame, veneer of stainless steel, brass grape).
