= Cathedral of the Nativity, Volgodonsk =

Cathedral of Volgodonsk Diocese

Cathedral of the Nativity
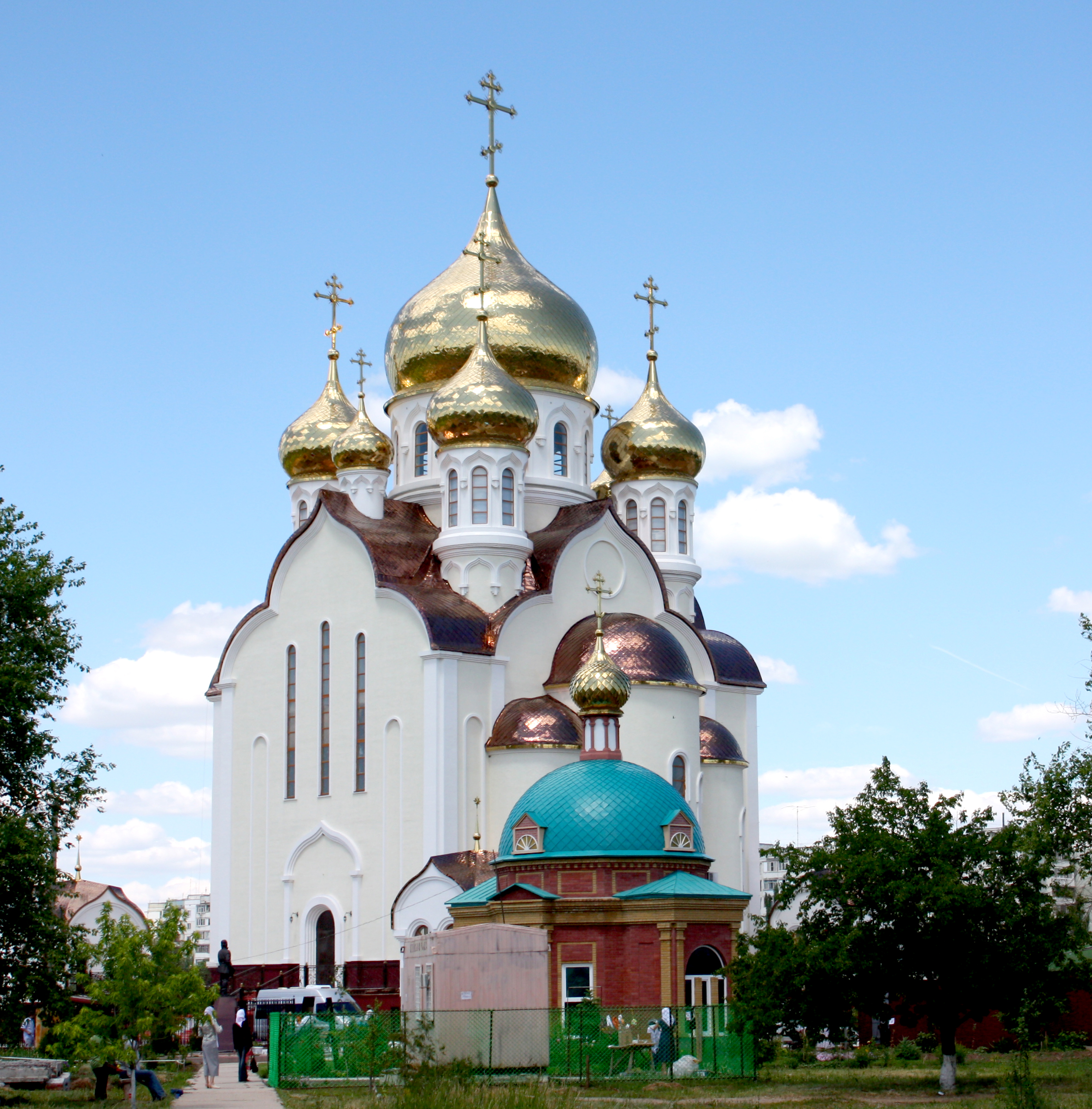

- Location within Russia

Religion
- Affiliation: Russian Orthodox

Location
- Location: Volgodonsk, Rostov Oblast Russia
- Coordinates: 47.5244°N 42.2131°E

Architecture
- Architect: Anatoly Andreev
- Completed: 2011

Cathedral of the Nativity (Russian: Кафедральный собор Рождества Христова) is a cathedral of Volgodonsk Diocese situated in the city of Volgodonsk, Rostov Oblast, Russia. The main temple of Volgodonsk Deanery. The Cathedral and Fyodor Ushakov Chapel located nearby form the Parish of the Nativity.

The Cathedral of the Nativity of Christ was founded on March 7, 2001.

However, the construction works had soon been suspended for several years. They were resumed on October 15, 2008. In the period from 2008 to 2011 on the territory of the Nativity Cathedral there had been built and consecrated a small church of St. Fyodor Ushakov, erected a monument dedicated to this prominent admiral, and acquired 13 bells for the belfry. On August 1, 2010 the first Divine Liturgy in the lower chapel of the cathedral was carried out ― in the temple of St. Seraphim of Sarov, named in honor of the patron saint of nuclear energy. In late 2010, four domes were installed, and in the beginning of January 2011 ― the central dome was also added. As a result, the total height of the cathedral was 56 meters, and together with the cross on the central dome ― 58 meters.

In 2011, the temple acquired the status of cathedral of the newly formed Diocese of Volgodonsk.
