= Atommash =

Russian engineering company

Coordinates: 47°30′26.34″N 42°13′25.09″E

Atommash (until 1991 Soviet Redmash)
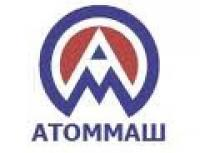
- Industry: Nuclear engineering
- Founded: 1976; 50 years ago
- Headquarters: Volgodonsk, until 1991 Soviet Union / since 1991 Russia
- Products: Equipment for nuclear power plants, energy, gas, oil
- Owner: Atomenergomash (Rosatom)
- Number of employees: 21,000 (1989); 3,188 (2020)
- Website: www.atommash.ru

Atommash (until 1991 Soviet Redmash) («Атоммаш») is a multidisciplinary engineering company located in Volgodonsk, Rostov Oblast, Russia. It was established in 1976 as a Soviet nuclear engineering corporation. Following privatization and bankruptcy in 1999, the industrial facilities of the enterprise were owned and managed by ZAO Energomash–Atommash, a part of the diversified engineering company Energomash.

Since 2015 the company has been part of Atomenergomash, the mechanical engineering division of Rosatom. Its current name is "AEM-technology" JSC "Atommash" branch in Volgodonsk.

== History ==
=== Soviet period: 1975–1991 ===
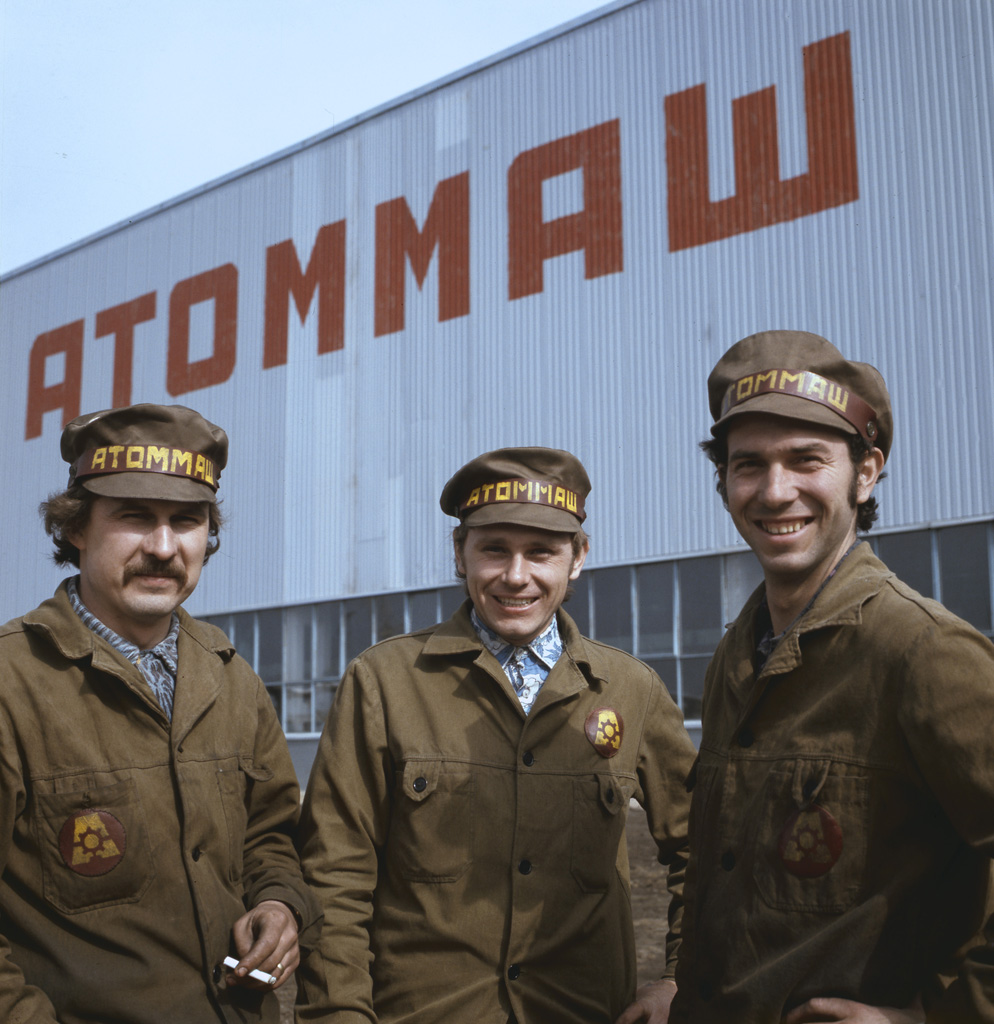
1977, builders of the future industrial giant

On May 22, 1970, a state Soviet committee for the construction of the plant was assembled. On July 8, 1972, official hiring process for workers and engineers started. On August 30, 1975, the first stilt of the Production Facility #1 was erected.

In 1973, the Politburo of the Central Committee of the Communist Party of the Soviet Union made a decision to establish a major nuclear engineering enterprise in Volgodonsk, Rostov Oblast. There were several reasons for choosing Volgodonsk, and above all, the town's proximity to the country's southern deposits of iron and steel. Equally important was the opportunity to utilize the Tsimlyansk Reservoir and the Volga–Don Canal (which connects the reservoir to the Volga) for shipping raw materials, components and assemblies to the plant and delivery of manufactured goods. Russia's internal waterway system made transportation of heavy and bulky items to the regions of the country and the world through the Sea of Azov, the Black and Caspian seas easier and cheaper. Roads, railways and an airport were created in order to support the plant.

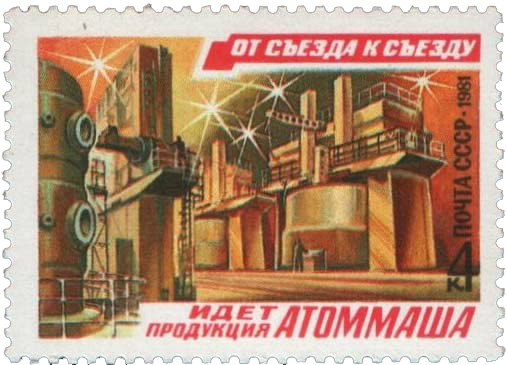
1981, a USSR postage stamp: "From Congress to Congress, the production of Atommash goes on"

Capacity utilization planning revealed that electricity generated by three hydropower stations of Volgodonsk is not sufficient. Therefore, it was decided to build the Rostov Nuclear Power Plant. In November 1974, the USSR Council of Ministers approved the technical design of the first stage of the industrial complex, which was originally called "The Volgodonsk Heavy Machinery Plant" (VZTM). Main tasks for the construction of VZTM (renamed to Atommash in March 1976) for the period from 1976 to 1980 were determined. Atommash started producing equipment for the nuclear energy industry in 1977. The cumulative power capacity produced by the company reached 3 GW by 1978 and 4 GW by 1979. In 1981, Atommash produced its first reactor for the second unit of the South Ukraine Nuclear Power Plant.

According to the plan of socio-economic development of the region, a whole new city area (the so-called "New City") was built in Volgodonsk in order to support industrial and economical activities of Atommash. Before the construction of Atommash, the population of Volgodonsk was 35 thousand people; in 1981 there were about 135 thousand people living in the city. The expansion of the city area came together with modern residential areas, nurseries, kindergartens, schools, hospitals, shopping centers, cafes and restaurants, laundries, sporting and fitness facilities, theatres, cinemas and more.

The Chernobyl disaster in 1986 and the Dissolution of the Soviet Union decreased the number of orders for the nuclear equipment, and the company had to expand the assortment of manufactured goods.

=== First years of the post-Soviet period: 1991–1994 ===
Like most Russian industrial enterprises, Atommash suffered greatly from the collapse of the Soviet Union. In 1991, the time of the collapse of the Soviet Union, the enterprise did not have enough finances to pay salaries. Orders dropped to 15% of the Soviet era volume. The company had to find customers outside Russia and to produce a broader scope of goods.

=== Bankruptcy of 1995–1999 ===
According to Decree 1546-r dated 30.08.1993, 378-r dated 25.03.1994 and 1437-r dated 08.09.1994 of Prime Minister Viktor Chernomyrdin, low-interest earmarked loans were allocated to Atommash in order to preserve its unique facilities and support its development. However, in 1994 those loans have been redirected to commercial structures and only then offered as loans to Atommash, but this time at exorbitant interest rates. For example, from July to August 1994, Atommash OJSC was forced to take commercial loans issued by Commercial Bank Doninvest at 216% interest per annum.

On 21.05.1996 Viktor Mikhaylov, Russian Minister for Atomic Energy, wrote an official letter D-M-27/4-01 to Vladimir Gusev, the chairman of the committee for industry, construction, transport and energy of the Russian State Duma. In his letter, Mikhaylov says that, according to Instruction P-593ns of the Russian Government dated 04.10.1995, the Ministry of Atomic Energy (MinAtom) made a proposal to the Federal Agency for State Property Management (Goskomimuschestvo), Federal Agency for Bankruptcy Proceedings and the Government of Rostov Oblast to convert the "golden share" into an ordinary stock and keep the unsold shares of Atommash OJSC in the federal property for up to 3 years. However, this proposal was not accepted, and the Ministry of Atomic Energy lost all control over the activities of Atommash OJSC. Hence, writes Mikhaylov, having decided to introduce external management on Atommash OJSC and having declined MinAtom's proposal, the three aforesaid agencies – Goskomimuschestvo, Federal Agency for Bankruptcy Proceedings and the Government of Rostov Oblast – took full responsibility for the future fate of Atommash.

The financial recovery plan introduced as of November 29, 1995, by the decision of the Arbitration court, brought no results as jobs continued declining and social tensions grew. The Russian Ministry of Atomic Energy proposed the following action plan to save the enterprise:

- Write off the debt on loans of Atommash owed to the Ministry of Finance of Russia (22 billion rubles), as well as respective interest and penalties as of September 1, 1996.
- Release Atommash from paying all kinds of taxes to the federal and local budgets from September 1, 1996, to December 31, 1997.
- Offer an installment plan (layaway) from January 1, 1998, to December 31, 2000, for the current accruals to the budgets of all levels.
- Sell the unsold 30% shares of Atommash to private shareholders under investment conditions.

However, those actions were not taken. The Arbitration court of Rostov Oblast appointed Alexander Stepanov the external manager (bankruptcy referee) of Atommash OJSC. At the time, Stepanov was First Vice President (and, since 1996, CEO) of Energomashcorporatsiya (EMK) JSC, a direct competitor of Atommash. Stepanov's appointment was actively lobbied by Tatiana Gramotenko, the Chief agent for bankruptcy proceedings in Rostov Oblast. Several Founders of EMK JSC were direct competitors of Atommash OJSC, which was a violation of the Russian antitrust law. The audit conducted by the Audit Chamber of Russian Federation showed that in a matter of one year EMK, controlled by its CEO Stepanov (at the same time the bankruptcy referee of Atommash OJSC), managed to buy 10.8% share in Atommash OJSC and more than 40% of its debt, which, according to the competition law, clearly poses a conflict of interest.

Governor of Rostov Oblast Vladimir Chub used the letter of MinAtom of Russia No.03-2739 from 12.09.1996 in Stepanov's interests. In his appeal No.1/6049 to the General Director of the Federal Service for Bankruptcy Proceedings Peter Mostovoy, Chub asks to write off, through the reduction of capital surplus, specific fixed assets and objects under construction of Atommash OJSC for an amount of 878 billion rubles. This led to a reduction of company's assets, the book value of which has already been drastically discounted. Governor Vladimir Chub had no authority to address the General Director of FSBP Mostovoy with a request to approve markdowns and write-offs of assets, which were a legitimate property of thousands of rightful shareholders, of which Russian Federation with its 30% share was the biggest.

Apart from the reduction of the asset value of Atommash, its workshops and equipment were leased to various limited liability partnerships (LLP) on conditions that were extremely disadvantageous to Atommash. LLPs, owned by the corrupt external management of Atommash, obtained strategic raw materials, components and semi-finished products at extremely low prices. Products manufactured by those LLPs on the territory of Atommash, were sold at a profit for the LLPs, while the damage (losses) was reflected on the balance sheet of Atommash OJSC. Colossal non-core assets and vast territories of Atommash, including agricultural companies with their land, were also expropriated.

According to the Plan of the Bankruptcy referee of Atommash OJSC Alexander Stepanov, a new company called EMK-Atommash JSC was created (Protocol No.3 of the Meeting of creditors of Atommash OJSC of 22.11.1996). The new company had two founders: Atommash OJSC (85,7% of charter capital) and Stepanov's EMK (14,3%). In January 1997, 70% of the assets of Atommash were transferred to EMK-Atommash JSC. Atommash OJSC contributed its liquid assets (fixed assets, current assets, intangible assets) and production assets to the charter capital of EMK-Atommash JSC. Illiquid assets (construction in progress, industrial sites, railways, etc.) remained on the balance sheet of Atommash OJSC. After that, EMK-Atommash JSC stock was transferred to EMK JSC.

Alexander Stepanov, now the CEO of "Energomashinostroitelnaya corporatsiya" JSC and at the same time the Bankruptcy referee of Atommash OJSC, wrote a letter on 05.05.1997 to the First Deputy Minister for Atomic Energy Lev Ryabev, assuring that he had understood the concern of MinAtom about the financial state of Atommash, and therefore suggested to work together to support EMK-Atommash JSC, his new company. In this letter Stepanov tried to convince MinAtom that there was no reason for worries, since the production facilities of Atommash were preserved, technological routines for manufacturing of core production were uninterrupted, and the establishment of EMK-Atommash JSC would not lead to restraint of competition. According to Stepanov's letter, the fact of trading liquid assets of Atommash OJSC for EMK-Atommash JSC stock would give the nearly bankrupt company a chance for a settlement with creditors. At the same time Stepanov, head of both companies, positions liquid assets which Atommash OJSC contributed to the charter capital of EMK-Atommash JSC as long-term investments.

In reality, however, the "Plan of external management and financial recovery on Atommash OJSC for the period from 29.11.1995 to 29.05.1997" did not lead to stabilization. Jobs were cut dramatically, wages were not paid, social tensions were spreading across the entire Volgodonsk city. While the assets of Atommash (through write-offs) and their value (through markdowns) have been reduced sharply, accounts payable, which were growing exponentially, started looking significant in comparison. As a result of the obviously inefficient external management on Atommash OJSC, the Arbitrary Court of Rostov Oblast made a decision to recognize the company bankrupt. Formally, Atommash OJSC was forcibly liquidated as a legal entity on 25.11.1999.

Thus, the bankruptcy of Atommash OJSC was, in practice, carried out in the interests of EMK-Atommash JSC which inherited all liquid assets and production facilities of Atommash OJSC. After the forced liquidation of Atommash OJSC, its unique industrial complex was controlled by several affiliates of EMK-Atommash JSC, including Energomash-Atommash LLC and, finally, Energomash-Atommash JSC of the Energomash group.

The bankruptcy of Atommash OJSC was inspected by the Audit Chamber of Russian Federation at the request of the committee for industry, construction, transport and scientific technologies of the State Duma of Russian Federation No.3.11-21/1312 dated 21.10.2000. This audit showed that, with the complicity of specific officials, the State suffered colossal material damage. In particular, the State lost a 30% stake in Atommash OJSC. The purpose of the bankruptcy of Atommash OJSC was to deprive its majority shareholders – the State itself and Concern YACONTO JSC (Russia, Moscow) – of their property, and therefore, of control over the economic, financial and production activities of the industrial giant. As a result of the Audit, the College of the Audit Chamber of Russian Federation issued a Definition No.6(289) dated 22.02.2002.

Bankruptcy of the strategic company caused great resonance in the Russian President's Administration and the Russian Government. First Deputy Secretary of the Security Council of Russia Mikhail Fradkov, in his Letter to the Deputy Prime Minister of Russia Viktor Khristenko (No.A21-1175 dated 28.03.2001), asks to conduct a verification of the actions of the Federal agency for insolvency (bankruptcy) proceedings against Atommash OJSC.

... we could not save Atommash. Having found itself in free market without the support of the industry, this flagship of nuclear engineering fell into an economic abyss and still cannot recover. It is regrettable that the Atommash team did not rebuff a group of people doing questionable personal socio-environmental career by fighting with the construction of the Rostov nuclear power plant and slandering against the Russian nuclear energy and industry. Today, when the Volgodonsk NPP has been launched, they are cowed. But the harm they did to the citizens of Volgodonsk and the entire Don Territory remains on their conscience – that is, if they have one. <...> I was hurt by the privatization of Atommash which occurred without having consulted the federal Minister, by law and order of the regional governors, who though that people working in the nuclear industry are a milking cow that doesn't require any investments. That's how the country lost its nuclear engineering flagship.

— Viktor Mikhaylov, Russian Minister for Atomic Energy in (1992–1998) interview of 2008,

On 25.12.2009 the Deputy of the Russian State Duma Anatoly Lisitsyn sent a letter (ref. LIS-767/GD) to Vladimir Putin, the Prime Minister of Russia at the time, asking to conduct an independent investigation of the bankruptcy of Atommash OJSC on the basis of the audit conducted by the Audit Chamber and the Definition issued by its college. The Deputy Prosecutor General of Russia Viktor Grin replied on 01.02.2010 to the State Duma that the bankruptcy of Atommash OJSC has been verified by the investigation department of Volgodonsk police. However, the police did not take the materials of the Audit Chamber into account, therefore, their resolution "not to initiate criminal proceedings" was cancelled and another inspection prescribed. The second inspection did not bring any result either. Dissatisfied with the answer, on 21.12.2010 Anatoly Lisitsyn sent a letter (ref. No.LIS-1282/GD) to the President of Russia Dmitry Medvedev, asking to order the respective authorities to secure Russia's national interests by assisting the Presidential Control Directorate in their inspection (ref. A8-6296-5 dated 02.11.2010) of the unprecedented premeditated bankruptcy of Atommash OJSC. As a result, on 08.07.2011 President Medvedev issued a Decree (ref. Pr-1948), ordering Prime Minister Putin to consider purchasing the facilities of Atommash so they can be managed by Rosatom and at the same time ordering Rashid Nurgaliyev, Russia's Minister of Internal Affairs at the time, to conduct another verification of the bankruptcy of Atommash OJSC, as per the materials presented by the General Prosecutor's Office and take action as appropriate.

=== Modern period (2000–2012) ===
The restructured Atommash became multidisciplinary. The company started manufacturing technical equipment including single, one-of-a-kind items. For example, a 140-ton vehicle which lifts the rocket and puts it upright on a launcher was manufactured on Atommash for the Sea Launch project.

In 2001, Atommash manufactured several items for the Bushehr Nuclear Power Plant, including the footing for the reactor and four 82-ton water tanks.

Since 2002 the facilities are utilized for mass production of gas turbines for small capacity CHP plants (up to 36 MW). By 2003, the number of employees on the company shrunk to 4,300 with the volume of output of 1.4 billion rubles. In 2004, the company's management announced a four-fold reduction in output for nuclear energy and the orientation of the main production to consumers in the gas industry. In 2009 Atommash re-initiated the manufacturing of equipment for nuclear power plants.

In his interview of May 2006, Sergey Kiriyenko, the head of State nuclear energy Corporation Rosatom, said that Rosatom is interested in employing the capacities of Atommash for the needs of Russian nuclear industry. "If the plant can and wants to return to the nuclear power industry, we are ready to discuss the matter. We can also promote the process by making direct contracts with Atommash, creating a joint venture and singling out its nuclear division. Any forms would be acceptable.", said Kiriyenko.

In May 2010, VTB bank (Russia, Moscow) filed a petition with the court, asking to initiate bankruptcy proceedings against "Energomash-Atommash" LLC. As per the petition, the company's debt the Bank is 356,5 million rubles (about $12 mln). The total debt of Energomash Group to VTB exceeds 1 billion rubles ($30 million). The total debt of Energomash Group to all Russian banks combined is estimated at nearly 30 billion rubles ($1 billion). Liquid assets, primarily, production facilities of "Energomash-Atommash" LLC were transferred to a new legal entity – "Energomash-Atommash" JSC.

On 18.10.2011 Deputy of the Russian State Duma Anatoly Lisitsyn appealed to Russian President Dmitry Medvedev (ref. LIS-1676/GD) asking to support the proposal of YACONTO LLC, the legal successor of Concern YACONTO JSC and the majority shareholder of Atommash OJSC, to restore the status quo of Atommash OJSC through the implementation of the so-called "Project-A" or an alternative option. In his reply from 06.04.2012 No.1-13/12160 to the letter that YACONTO LLC sent to President of Russia Dmitry Medvedev on 27.02.2012 (ref. No.120227-А01), the Deputy Chief of Rosatom Nuclear Energy State Corporation Kirill Komarov says that Rosatom shares the shareholder's concern about the current state of Atommash, since the facilities of the latter, still one of the biggest power engineering companies in Russia, are being used for the production of equipment for the nuclear industry. The letter of Rosatom also indicates that "Project-A" is within the competence of the Federal Agency for State Property Management (Rosimushchestvo), since, according to the Decree of the Russian Government No.432 of 05.06.2008, Rosimushchestvo is responsible for protection of legitimate interests of Russian Federation when it comes to state property management.

The Investigative Committee of Russian Ministry of the Interior instituted criminal proceedings against Alexander Stepanov, the owner of Energomash Corporation and former bankruptcy Referee of Atommash OJSC. Stepanov is charged with fraud with a commercial loan issued by Sberbank in the amount of 12.7 billion rubles (nearly US$413 million). Criminal prosecution against Alexander Stepanov was triggered by a personal Statement from German Gref, the CEO & President of Sberbank. After the investigation, the case was transferred to a Presnensky court of Moscow (Case No.1-149 / 2012, art.30 p. 3, art.159 p. 4 of the Criminal Code of Russia – large-scale fraud and attempted crime). Charges in fraudulent bankruptcy of Atommash OJSC, however, were not brought in this criminal case.

As Alexander Stepanov told his defense attorneys, his arrest (which took place on 01.02.2011) was preceded by several business meetings with representatives of Sberbank. Each meeting was accompanied by extortion and threats to have Stepanov arrested if he does not fulfill the requests of the extortionists within a month. Stepanov claims that representatives of Sberbank and German Gref personally demanded 100 million U.S. dollars in cash and a 75% share in the Energomash holding, in exchange for cessation of persecution. On top of that, says Stepanov, he was expected to "donate" several assets to Sergey Kiriyenko – the Head of State Corporation "Rosatom" – personally. The above gave Stepanov a reason to announce that the loan issued by Sberbank to Energomash Group was, in fact, a cunning attempt to obtain the unparalleled industrial facilities of Atommash OJSC by arresting his property, the market value of which is several times greater than the commercial loan he took from Sberbank.

At the official proposal of State Corporation for Nuclear Energy "Rosatom" regarding restoration of the status quo of Atommash OJSC through the implementation of Project-A, YACONTO LLC has sent two Statements to the Federal Agency for State Property Management ("Rosimuschestvo") (out. No.120614-A01 from 14.06.2012 and No.120702-A01 from 02.07.2012). In particular, the said Statements imply that the implementation of Project-A will restore the status quo of Atommash OJSC and bring back 30% of its shares to the State, ensure payment of all its debts to third parties and oblige the guilty party to compensate for the inflicted damage. The State will accumulate the controlling stake in Atommash OJSC by exchanging the 28.5% interest owned by YACONTO LLC for property agreed with investors and partners. The interest accumulated by the State in Atommash OJSC and other assets, obtained as compensation for the damage dealt to Atommash, may be transferred to an appropriate trust authorized by the State to carry out the development of nuclear engineering and to implement socio-economic programs in Russia and abroad. As per the Statements, the implementation of "Project-A" will correspond to the interests of nearly all opposing parties, through settlement of conflicts, disputes, claims, by means of a know-how framework.

YACONTO LLC appealed to Russian President Vladimir Putin with a Statement (out. No.120815-А01 of 15.08.2012), openly published on www.yaconto.com. The grounds for addressing the Guarantor of Constitution of Russia were set by replies sent by Rosimuschestvo (out. No.DP-13/26669 of 13.07.2012 and out. No.13/30986 of 03.08.2012), in response to Statements of YACONTO LLC (out. No.120614-A01 of 14.06.2012 and out. No.120702-A01 of 02.07.2012) regarding restoration of the status-quo of Atommash OJSC through the implementation of Project-A. The reply received from the North Caucasian Federal District Headquarters of the Investigative Committee of Russia (out. No.301/23-4686-12 of 05.09.2012), which speak of inspections of the premeditated bankruptcy of Atommash OJSC carried out by the branches of the Russian Ministry of Interior and General Prosecutor's Office in Rostov region, prompted YACONTO LLC to address Vladimir Putin with a Complaint (out. No.120924-А01 of 24.09.2012). Disappearance of YACONTO LLC's Statement (out. No.120815-А01 of 15.08.2012), addressed to Russian President Vladimir Putin personally, from the Presidential Administration of Russia, and the 3 (three) letters from federal authorities, became a reason for YACONTO LLC to appeal to the Russian President once again (out. No.121009-A01 of 09.10.2012) with extended information about the activity of corrupt officials, involved in the bankruptcy of Atommash OJSC.

On 29.10.2012 Moscow's Presnenskiy district court sentenced the former director of the Energomash group Alexander Stepanov to 4.5 years in prison at the lawsuit from Sberbank of Russia, finding him guilty of attempted 12-billion-ruble fraud and exceeding his authority. This, however, did not prevent the Saint Petersburg-based Engineering Company AEM-technology JSC (a subsidiary of Atomenergomash, a part of the Rosatom State corporation) from leasing the production assets of the former Atommash OJSC. Russia's target of 23% of country's electricity to be generated by nuclear power plants by 2020, as well as works under existing (not including future) contracts for construction of NPPs for different countries, proved to be too ambitious and hardly feasible without the facilities of Atommash. Lease of the production facilities which used to belong to Atommash OJSC, transferred to EMK-Atommash JSC after the bankruptcy of the former, and then again to "Energomash-Atommash" LLC (part of Mr. Stepanov's Energomash Group) appears strange, considering the fact that Stepanov was jailed for large-scale fraud committed in Russia and abroad. The Federal Antimonopoly Service of Russia (FAS), by its decision of October 16, met the petition filed by the Engineering Company AEM-technology regarding the acquisition for temporary ownership and use under a lease contract of up to 100% of fixed production assets of Atommash.

Production of modern high-tech equipment for development of nuclear industry around the world will be facilitated by Atomenergoprom JSC and the French corporation Alstom as a joint venture "Alstom-Atomenergomash" LLC (JV AAEM) on the premises of Atommash OJSC, leased by State Corporation Rosatom in late 2012. The joint venture "Alstom – Atomenergomash" was established in 2007, but did not have sufficient industrial capacity with respective infrastructure, which State Corporation Rosatom was not able to provide. The infrastructure and manufacturing capabilities of the former Atommash OJSC were utilized to support a long-term Russian program for producing nuclear engineering equipment, for both domestic and international customers.

== Operations ==
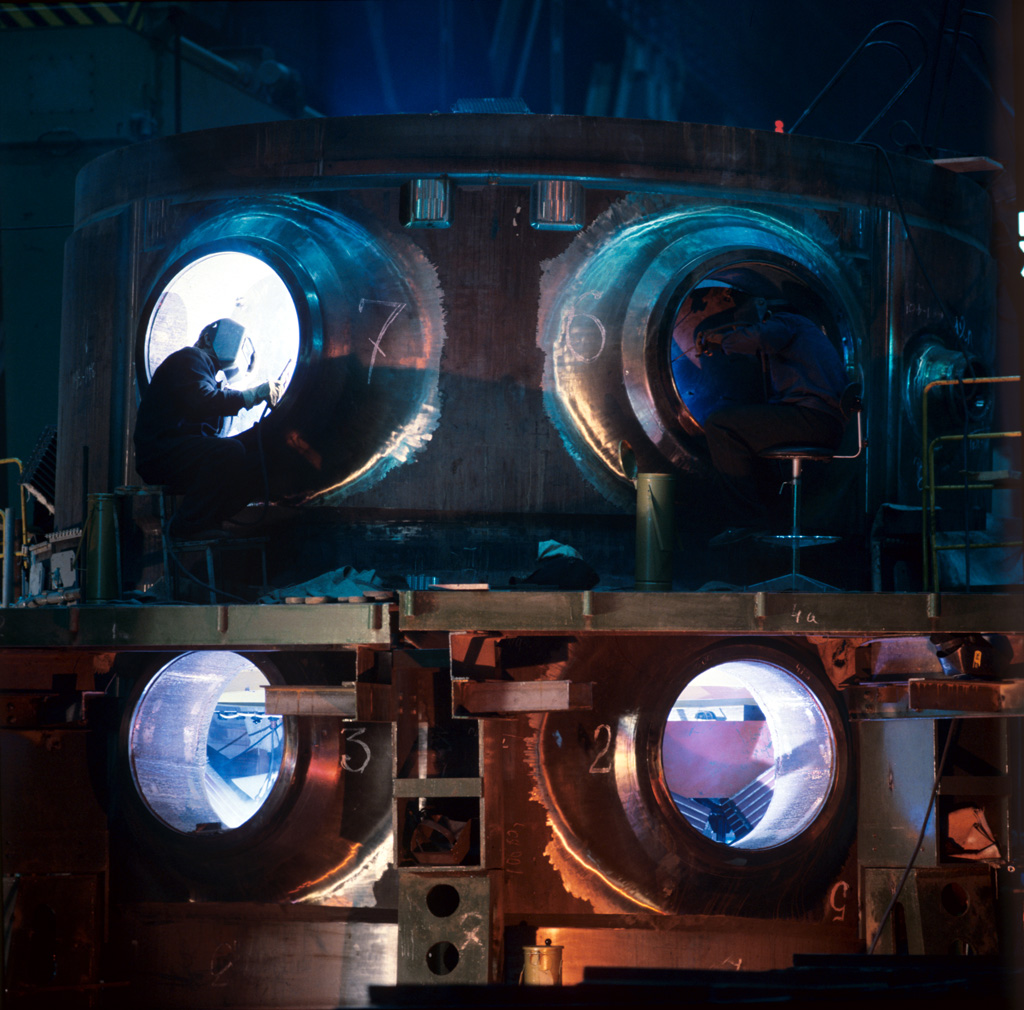
1982, Treatment of the interior part of a VVER-1000 reactor frame.

Being one of Russia's biggest industrial complexes and having 6 million m^{2} of production facilities, Atommash was equipped with unique imported modern equipment, over 80% of which was purchased in Germany, Japan, France, UK, Italy, Austria, Sweden, United States and other countries, from concerns like Italimpianti, ESAB, Varian Associates, Mannesmann AG.

One of the early successes of Atommash was the manufacturing of a vacuum chamber toroidal doughnut for the T-15 fusion reactor at the Kurchatov Institute – at 6 meters high, 11 meters in diameter and 120 tons.

In addition to nuclear machinery equipment, Atommash was capable of producing over 1000 kinds of products. Those types of products included, but were not limited to: non-standard metal equipment of large sizes, various metal containers for energy systems (heat-, hydro-, wind power), metallurgical, mining, oil and gas production and processing systems, including ready for use plants for deep processing of petroleum and its residual fractions on the basis of cleaner technologies and processes, compact mini oil refineries with a capacity of 50 to 500 thousand tons per year, mini-factories for recycling and processing of by-products and waste oil, equipment for the construction industry, including equipment for launch pads for missiles and spacecraft, for sea water desalination plants, containers for transportation and disposal of nuclear waste, railroad tank cars for transportation of liquid gas, biomass energy units for reprocessing of agricultural and animal breeding waste into environmentally clean, high-quality fertilizers and methane, etc.

Prior to the Chernobyl disaster, Atommash manufactured more than 100 units of high-tech equipment for NPPs, including 14 VVER-1000 reactors, 5 of which never left the plant's warehouse. During the bankruptcy of Atommash OJSC these reactors have been transferred to EMK-Atommash JSC (see "Bankruptcy of 1995–1999" section) at dramatically lowered net book value. In a few years, some of those items and their components became a subject of investigation in the Arbitration court of Rostov region, during mutual lawsuits between EMK-Atommash JSC and the National nuclear energy generating company Energoatom under Case No.A53-21263/2005 (the claimed value of those goods was several times higher this time), followed by an appellate to the Federal Arbitration Court of the North Caucasian Federal District, Case No.A53-4049/2006, which was concluded with an according Resolution dated 23.03.2010.

Atommash was capable of producing equipment and products with a wall thickness of 1 to 400 millimetres (0.039 to 15.748 in), diameter up to 22 metres (72 ft), length up to 80 metres (260 ft) and weight up to 1000 tons. Atommash practiced electron beam welding, automatic welding in narrow cutting, automatic welding of nozzles, welding of large-sized products with wall thickness up to 600 millimetres (24 in). It possessed high-end equipment for heat treatment, welding, non-destructive testing (NDT), laboratories for exceptionally complex material testing and test facilities for finished products.

Atommash exported its production to Germany, United States, France, China, Japan, India, Singapore, Bulgaria, Greece, Turkey, Iran, Cuba, Indonesia and others. The company has its own heavy duty mooring berth on Tsimlyansk Reservoir, which allowed shipping bulky and heavy products, which used to be a natural advantage of Atommash over its domestic competition. The quality of items produced by Atommash has been confirmed by an international certificate issued by ASME (American Society of Mechanical Engineers).

In 2009 Atommash re-initiated the manufacturing of equipment for nuclear power plants. It is the Russia's monopolist for manufacturing of melt localization devices for nuclear power plants.

The first nuclear reactor produced by Atommash after a 29-year long hiatus was a VVER-1200, for the Belarusian nuclear power plant. According to press reports, it took 840 days (2 years and 4 months) to build the reactor; it was shipped from Atommash on October 14, 2015. After being transported by barge over the Tsimlyansk Reservoir, the Volga–Don Canal, the Volga–Baltic Waterway, and the Volkhov River to Novgorod, the reactor was then shipped by a special rail car to Belarus.

Volume of production and # of employees / Year	1989	1997	2003	2006	2007	2008	2009
Volume of production, mln. rub.	-	-	-	3137,3	3666,4	3451,8	3800,0
Number of employees	21000	5109	4300	2732	2733	2885	2900

Some of the products currently manufactured by Atommash are: refueling equipment and manipulators, spent fuel storages (dry and wet), depleted uranium shielding, lead shielding, condensers, cranes and lifting equipment, specialised doors, heat exchangers, large ferrous components, pool water purification systems, pressure vessels, storage tanks, pumps, valves, nuclear steam supply systems, pressurizers, reactor control rods, drives and mechanisms, reactor internals, reactor pressure vessel seals, containers/casks handling equipment, hydraulic integrated circuits, packaging design and engineering and more.

== Ownership ==
After privatization, Atommash was a joint-stock company; 30% of the shares were controlled by the state. The remaining 70% interest belonged to private persons and companies. Concern YACONTO JSC (an industrial conglomerate headquartered in Moscow) was the second largest shareholder of Atommash OJSC after the State itself, holding 28.5% shares as of 1997. The Board of Directors included 9 members. Since 2012, Atommash plant is a part of Atomenergomash, the Rosatom's machine building division.

== Extra materials ==
- A booklet about Atommash OJSC (1993) - in English
- An Atommash photo gallery: 30+ photos from 1987-2012

== Gallery ==
Works on the enterprise
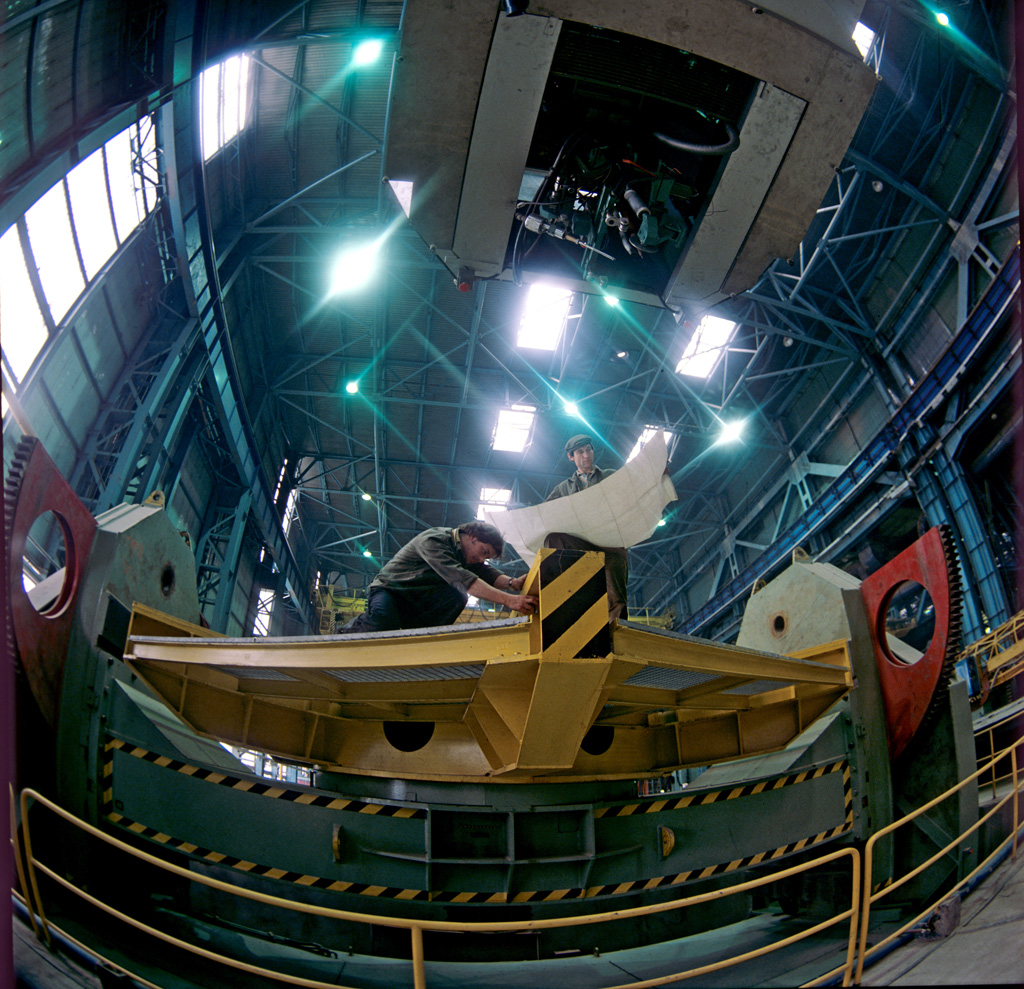
1982

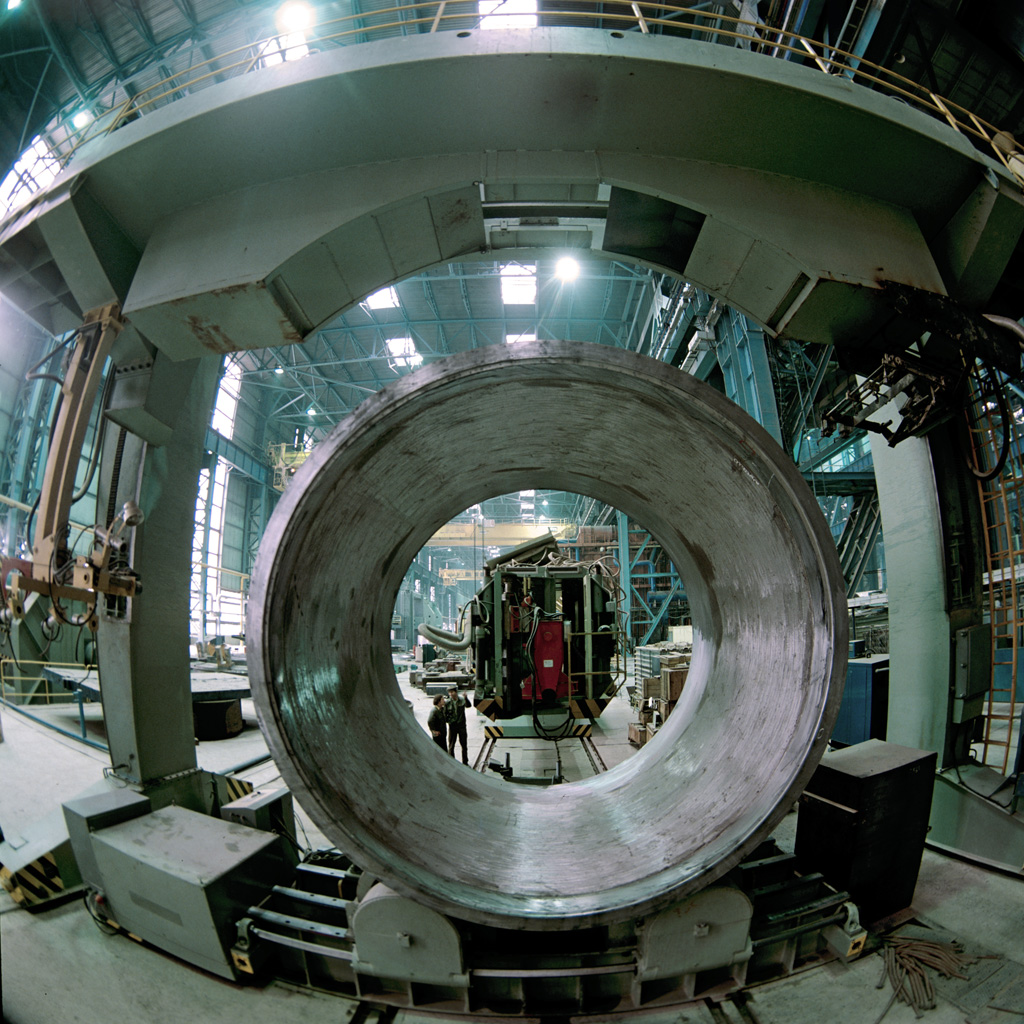
1982

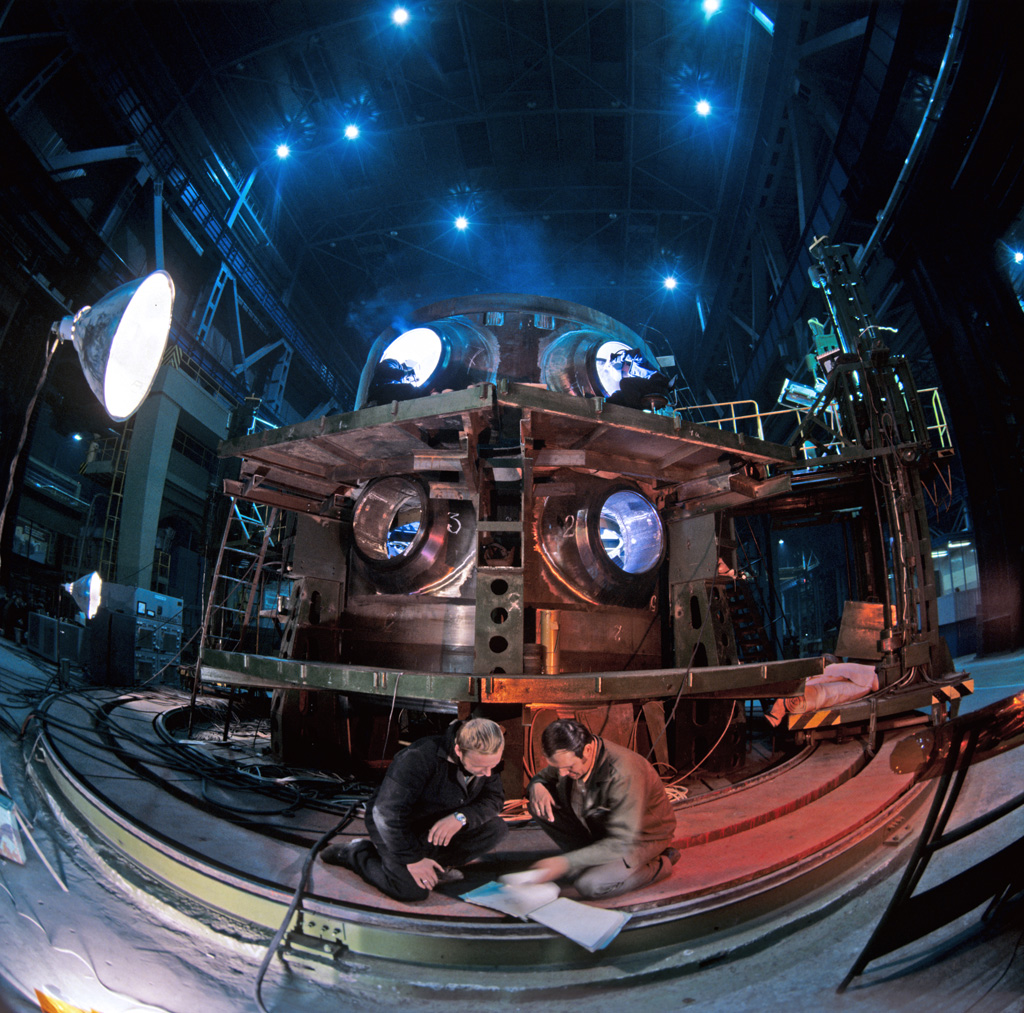
1982

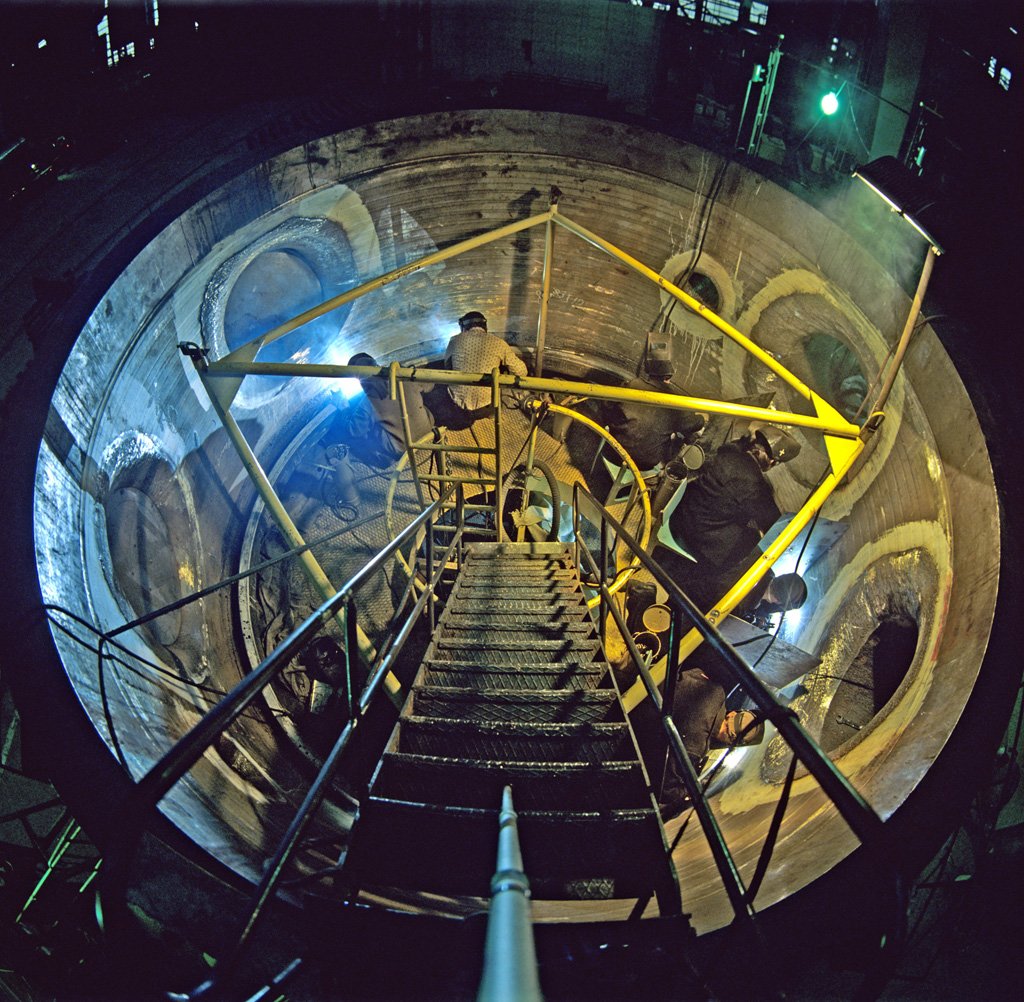
1982

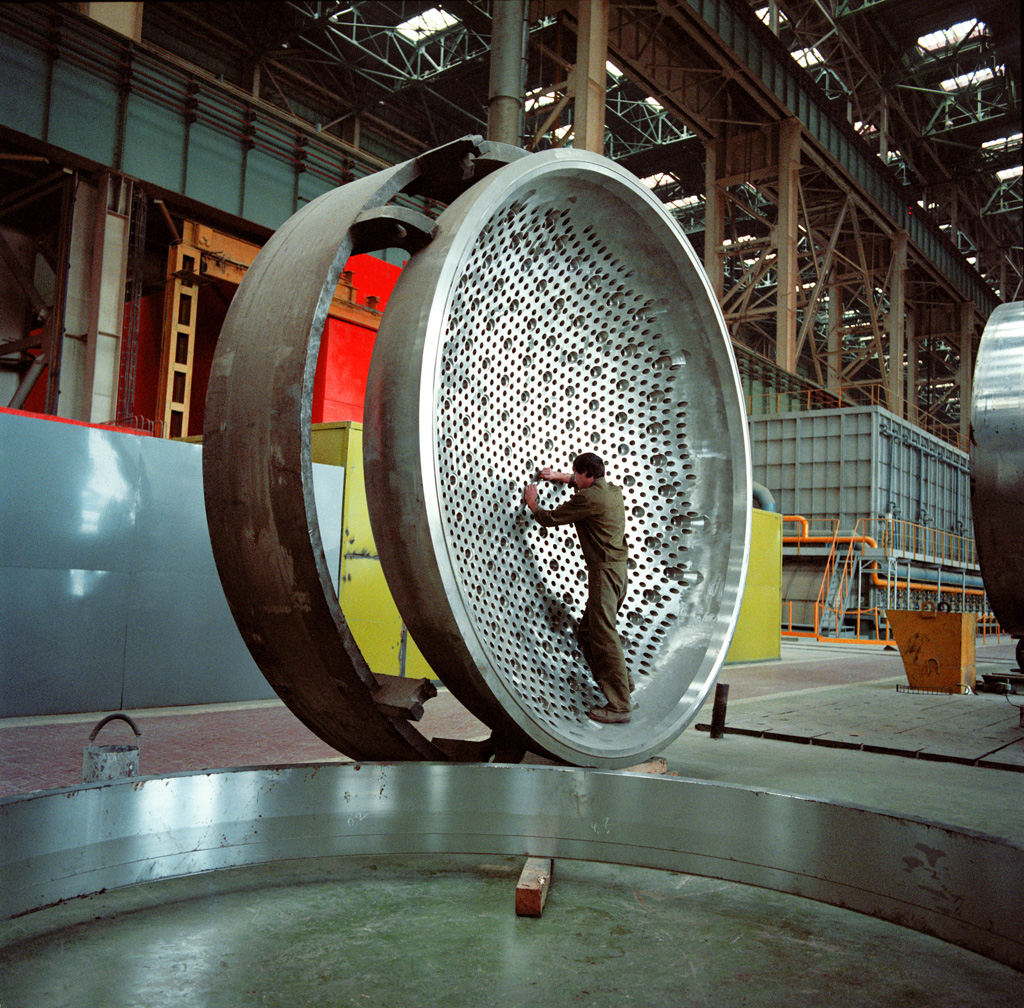
1989

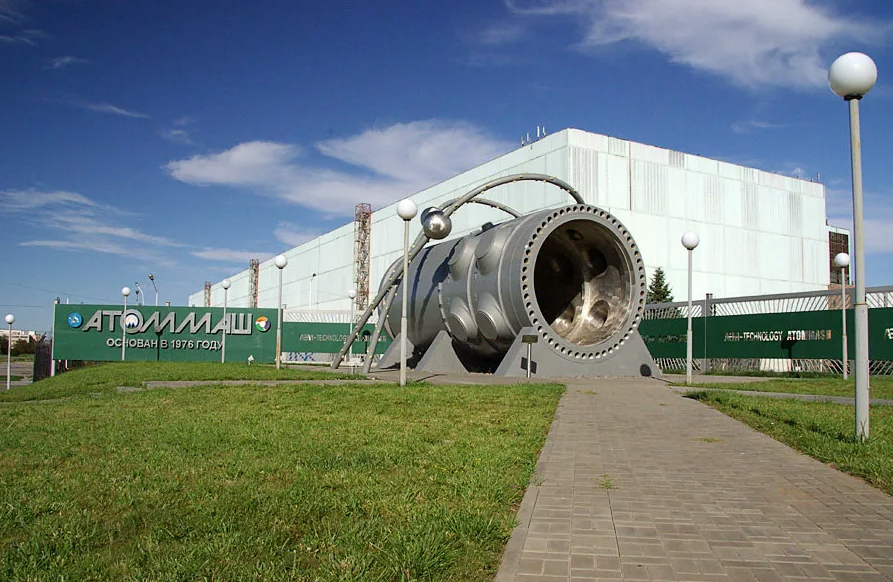
Monument "Reactor" at Atommash, 2021

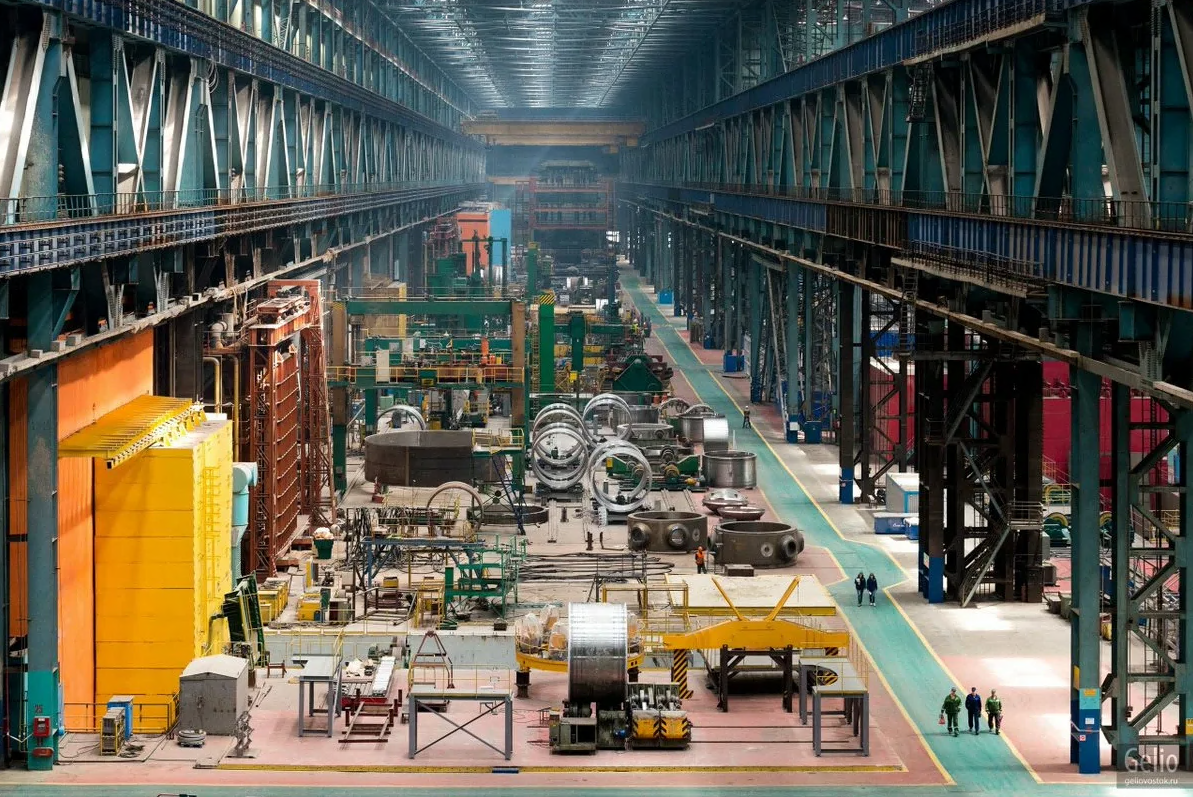
Atommash workshop view, 2021

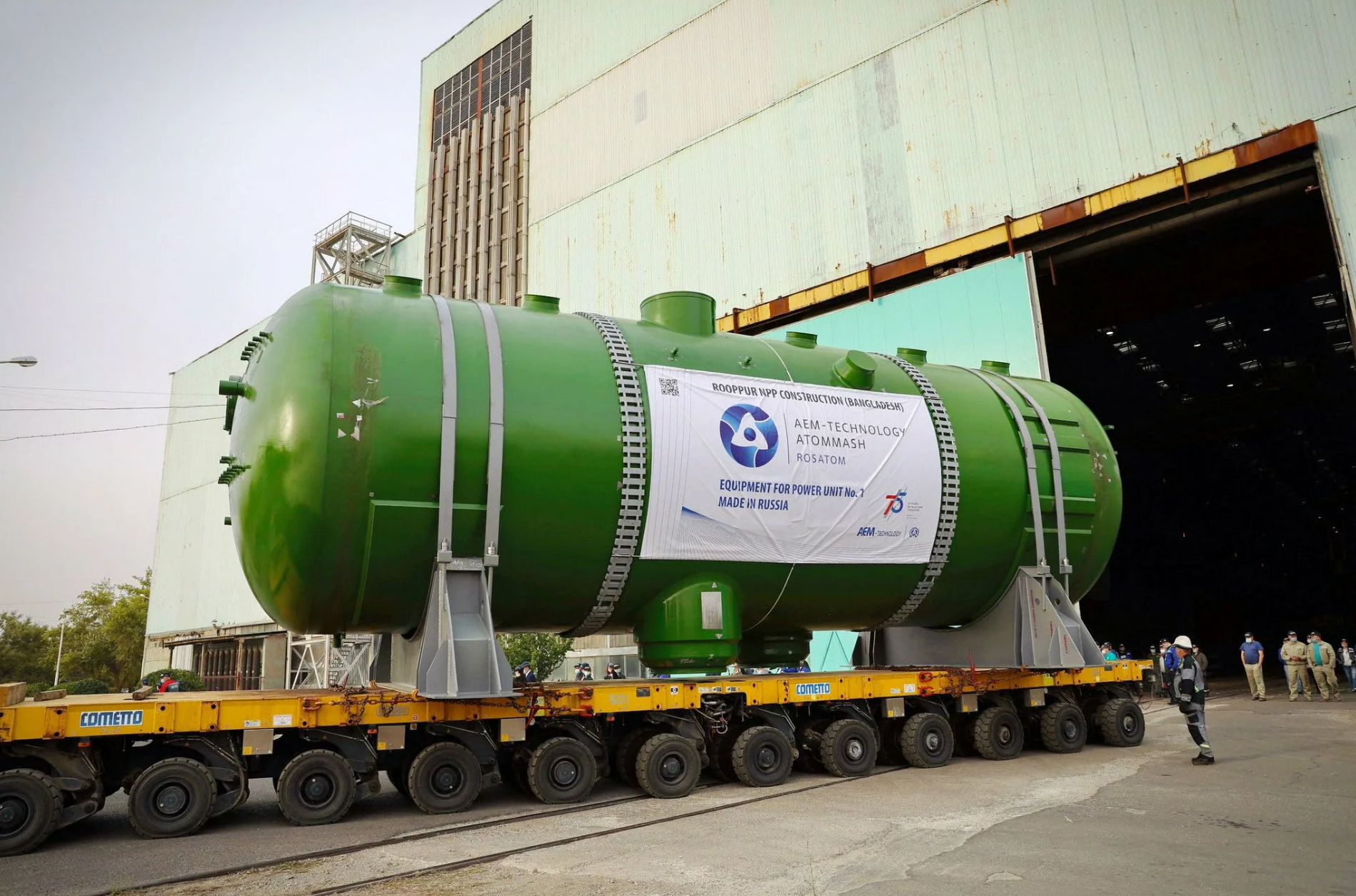
Atommash steam generator for Bangladesh, 2021

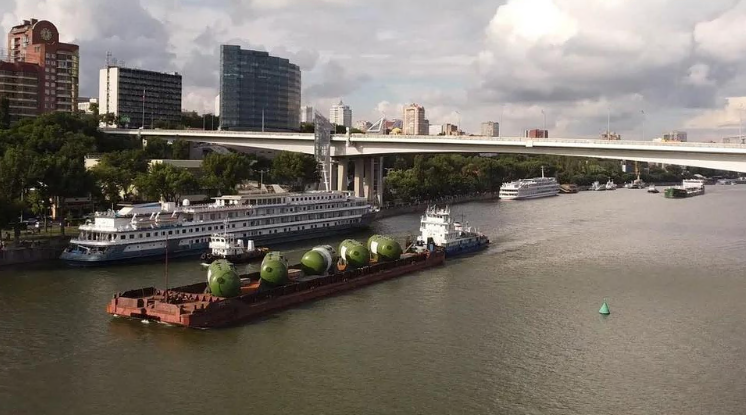
Atommash transportation of steam generator for Bangladesh, 2021
Atommash merchandise of the 70-80-s
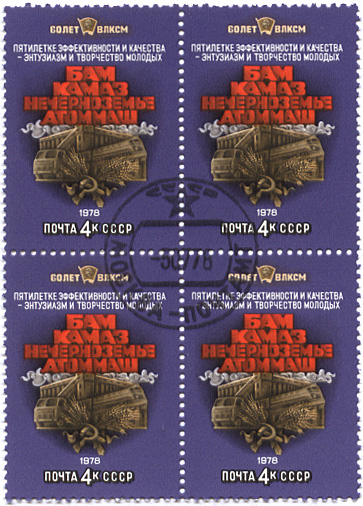
1978, USSR postage stamp featuring four biggest industrial endeavors of the time in USSR: Atommash, BAM, Kamaz, Nechernozemye

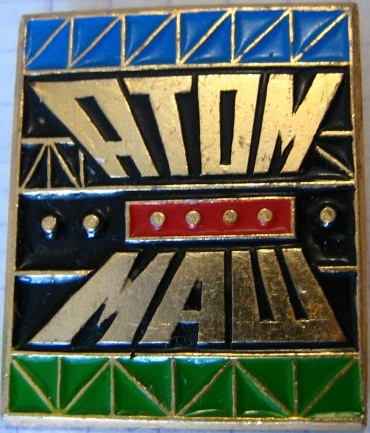
A metal badge (pin) with an "Atommash" sign (70-80-s)

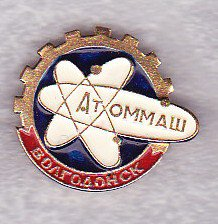
A metal badge (pin) with an "Atommash - Volgodonsk" sign (70-80-s)

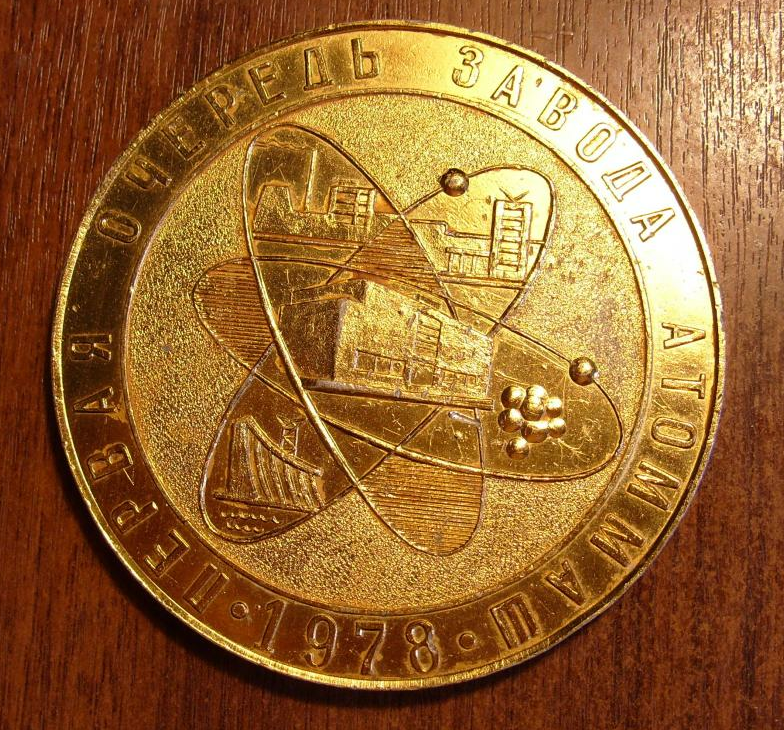
A medal Launch of Atommash, 1978
