= Cossacks (sculpture composition) =

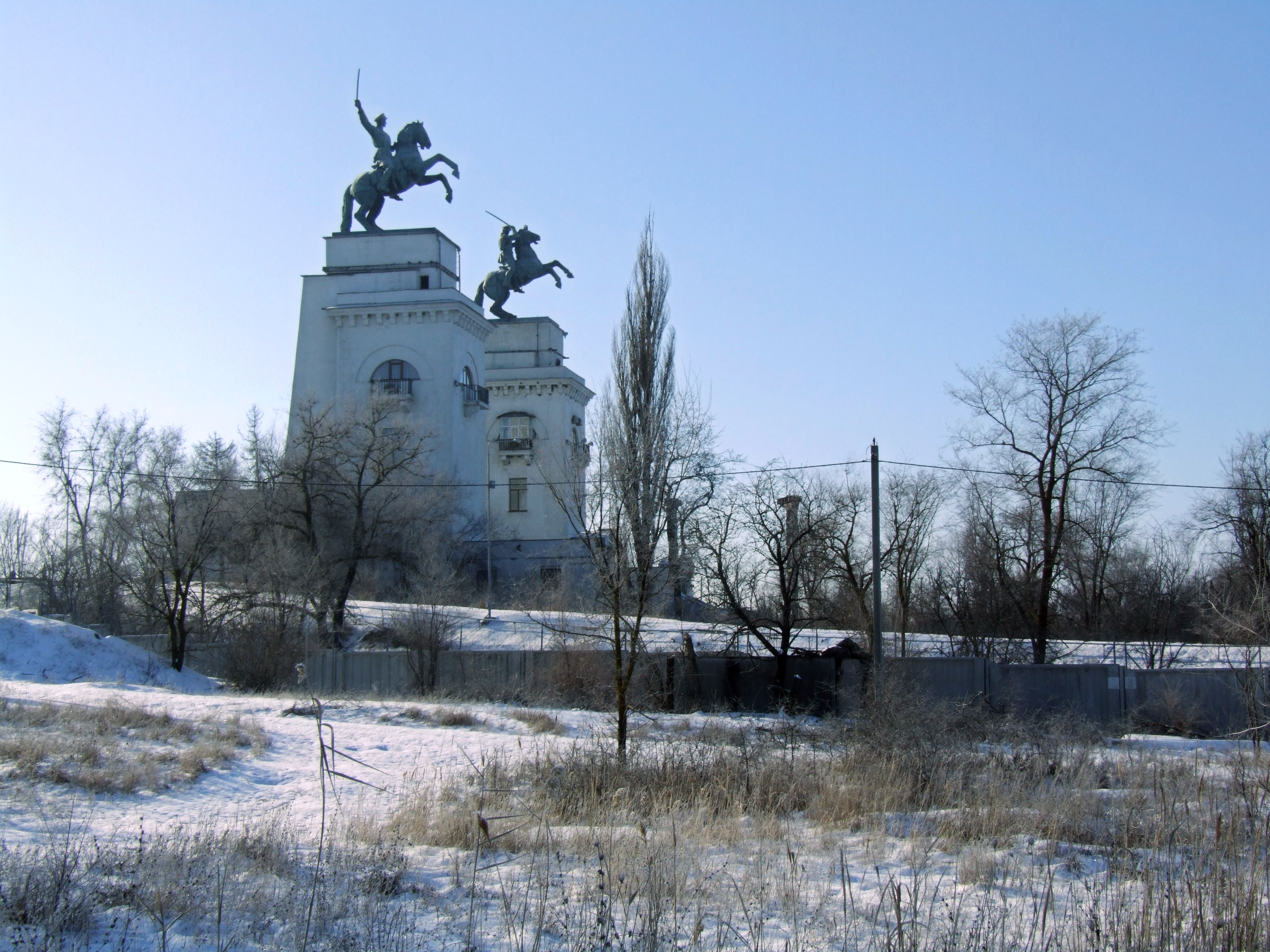
- Artist: G. Motovilov
- Year: 1953
- Type: Equestrian Statue
- Location: Volgodonsk

Cossacks (Russian: Казаки) is a sculpture composition on the north-west outskirts of Volgodonsk, Rostov oblast, Russia. It decorates the lock No. 15 of Volga–Don Shipping Canal. The sculpture composition was opened in 1953. It was designed by sculptor Georgy Motovilov and architect Leonid Polyakov. By resolution of the Council of Ministers of the Russian Soviet Federative Socialist Republic of August 30, 1960 No. 1327, the monument was designated a federal Heritage Site. It is the only object of federal cultural heritage in Volgodonsk and Volgodonskoy District. Cossacks sculptures symbolize the military glory of the Don Cossacks as a whole and the feat of the 4th Guards Kuban Cossack Cavalry Corps during the Great Patriotic War.

== Description ==
The sculpture composition consists of two towers-columns located on both sides of the last lock (No. 15) of Volga–Don Shipping Canal. Massive pedestals are topped with bronze statues of horsemen. The pedestals are designed in the style of early classicism. They are decorated with fielded panel. The monument is 9 m height; width is 4.5 m at the base.

The Cossacks in uniform represented as a prancing horsemen. One of them threatens with a shashka. Other keeps it above the head. Economic or some other activities that can undermine preservation of the monument is prohibited on the immediate area because that this sculpture composition is object of cultural heritage. Also advertisement placement and deforestation are prohibited.

== Gallery ==
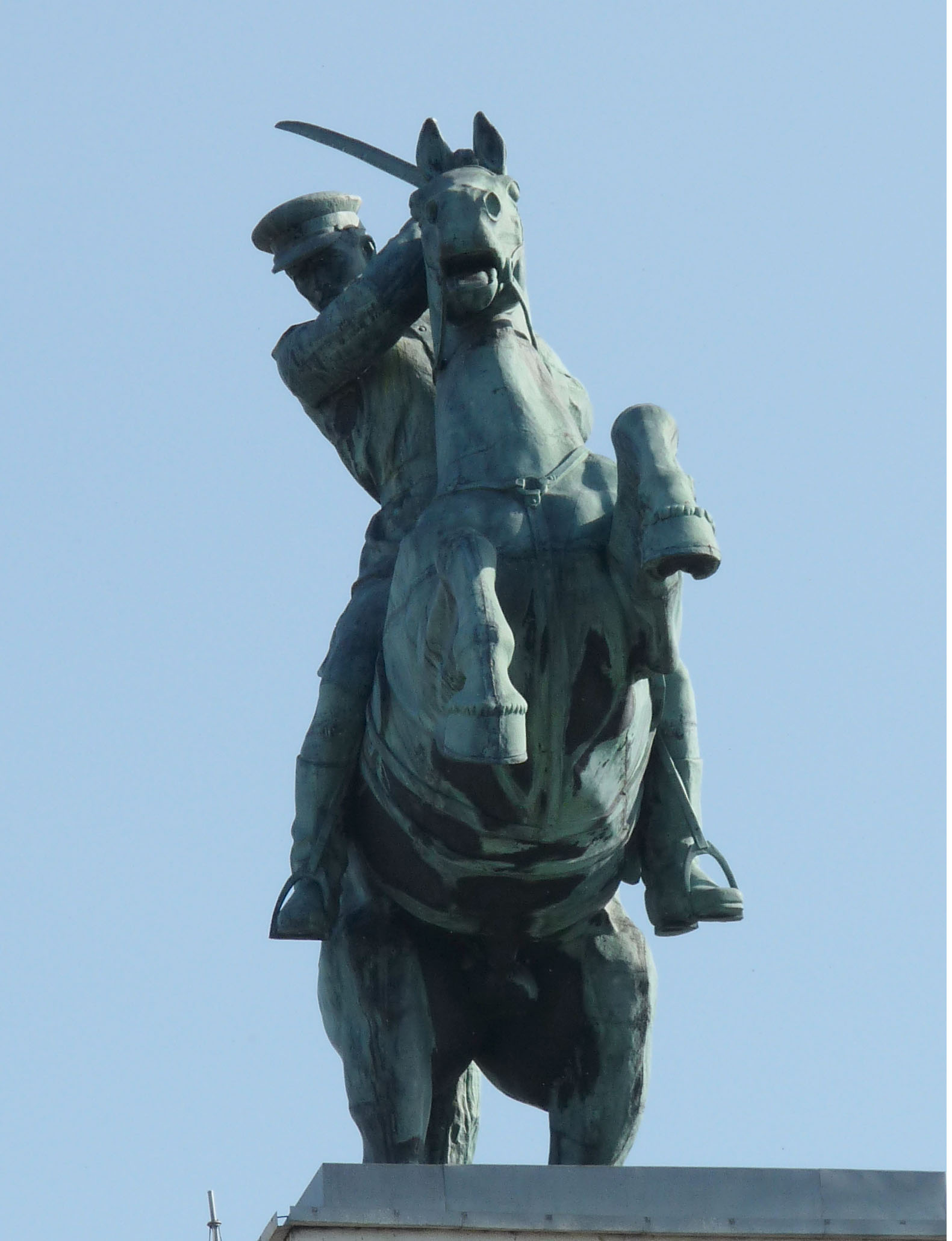

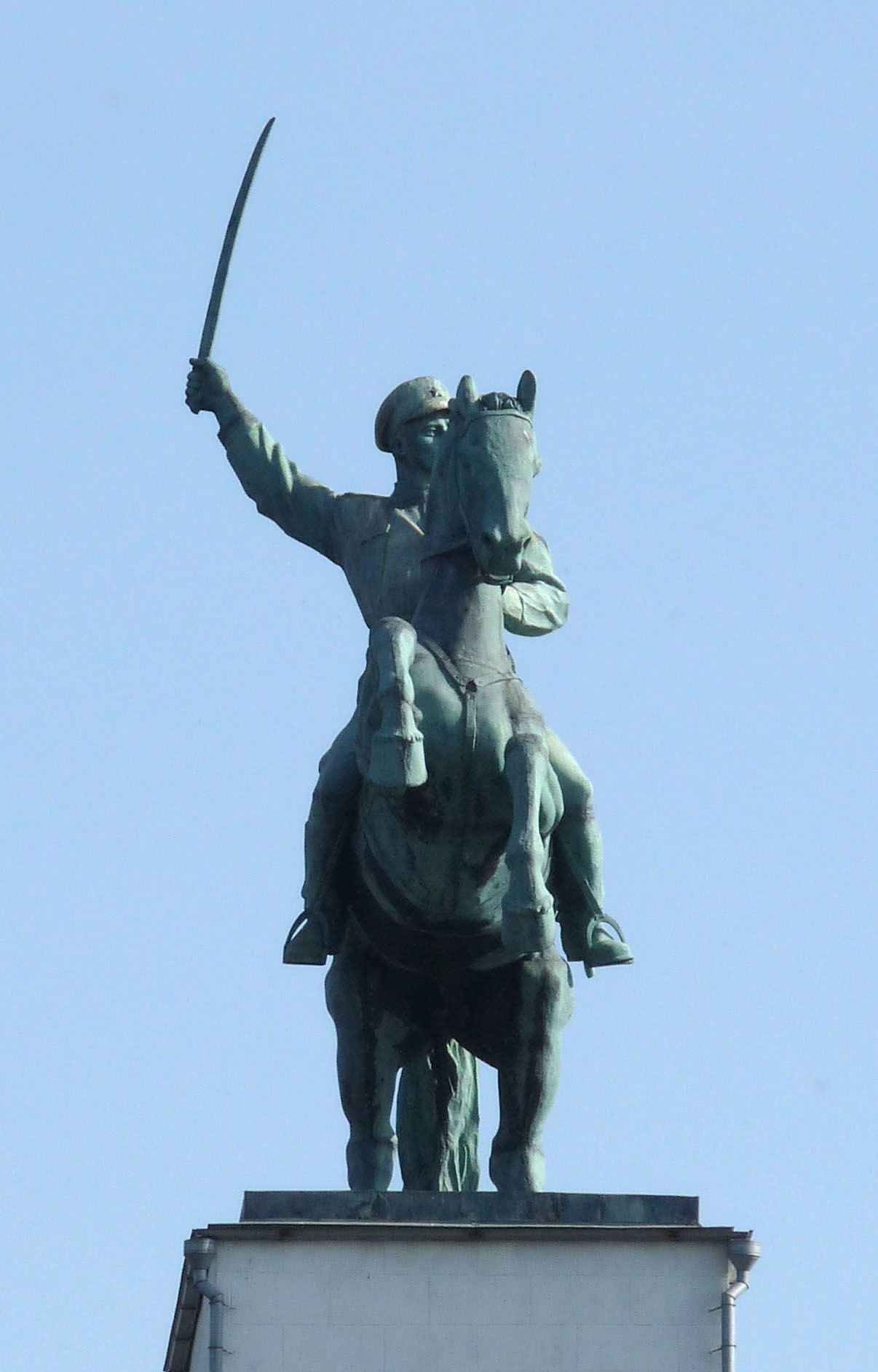

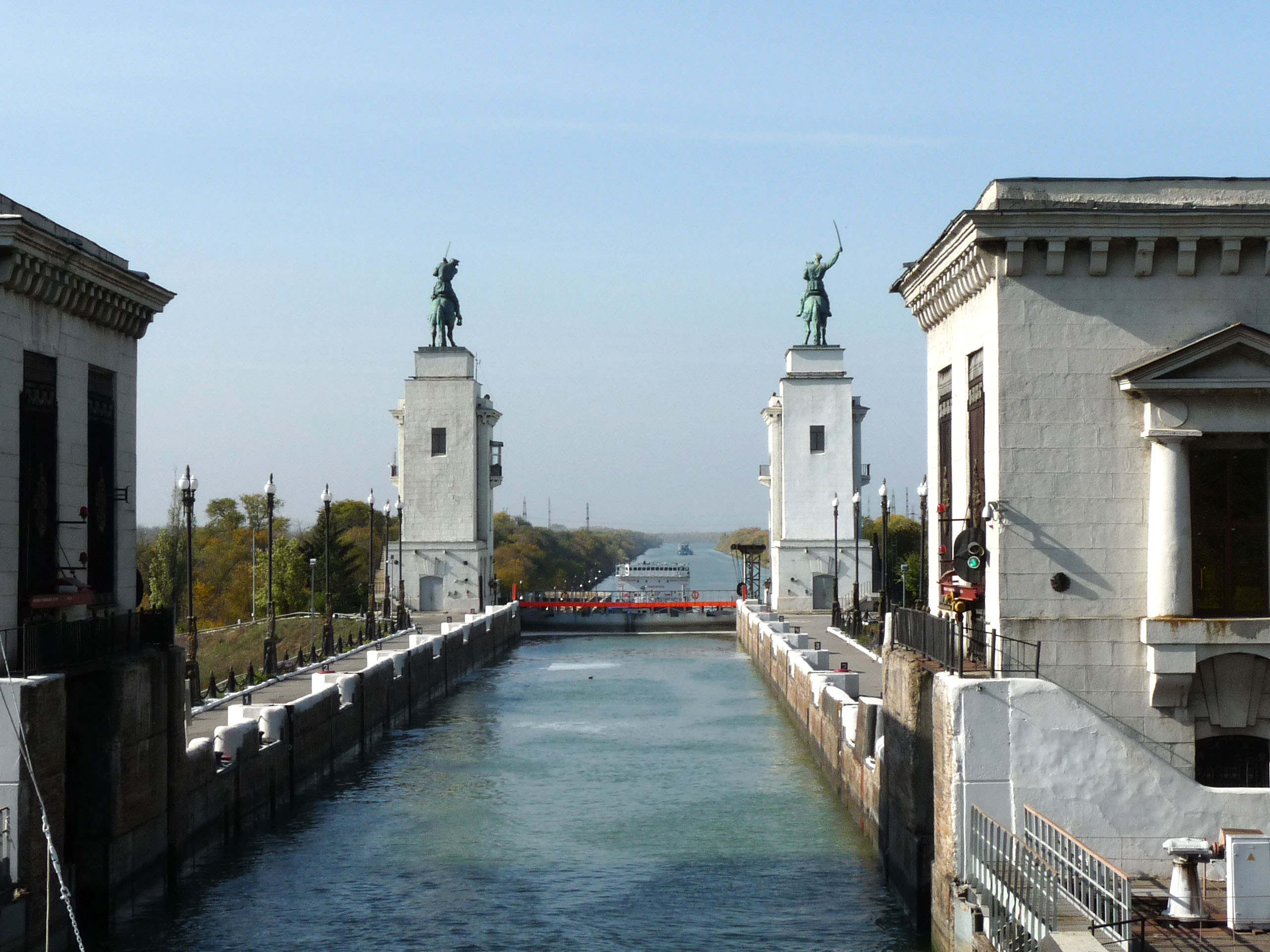
View of the lock No. 15
