= Aleksei Germashov =

Russian footballer and coach

Personal information
- Full name: Aleksei Nikolayevich Germashov
- Date of birth: 28 September 1982 (age 44)
- Place of birth: Volgodonsk, Russian SFSR
- Height: 1.88 m (6 ft 2 in)
- Positions: Defender; midfielder

Senior career*
Years	Team	Apps	(Gls)
1998–1999	FC Volgodonsk (amateur)		
2000	FC Neftyanik Tsimlyansk		
2000–2001	FC Volgodonsk (amateur)		
2001	FC Mayak Volgodonsk		
2001	FC Tsimla Tsimlyansk		
2002–2003	FC Lada Togliatti	62	(1)
2004	FC Baltika Kaliningrad	21	(0)
2004–2005	FC Fakel Voronezh	24	(0)
2006–2007	FC Lada Togliatti	48	(0)
2007	FC Volga Ulyanovsk	12	(1)
2008–2009	FC Nosta Novotroitsk	24	(0)
2010	FC Tyumen	14	(0)
2011–2012	FC Torpedo Vladimir	39	(0)
2012–2013	FC Fakel Voronezh	29	(1)
2014–2015	FC Mayak Volgodonsk		
2016–2018	FC Volgodonsk (amateur)		

Managerial career
- 2016–2017: FC Volgodonsk
- * Club domestic league appearances and goals

Aleksei Nikolayevich Germashov (Russian: Алексей Николаевич Гермашов; born 28 September 1982) is a Russian professional football coach and a former player.

== Club career ==
He played seven seasons in the Russian Football National League for five different clubs.
