= Volgodonsk =

City in Rostov Oblast, Russia

Volgodonsk Волгодонск
- City
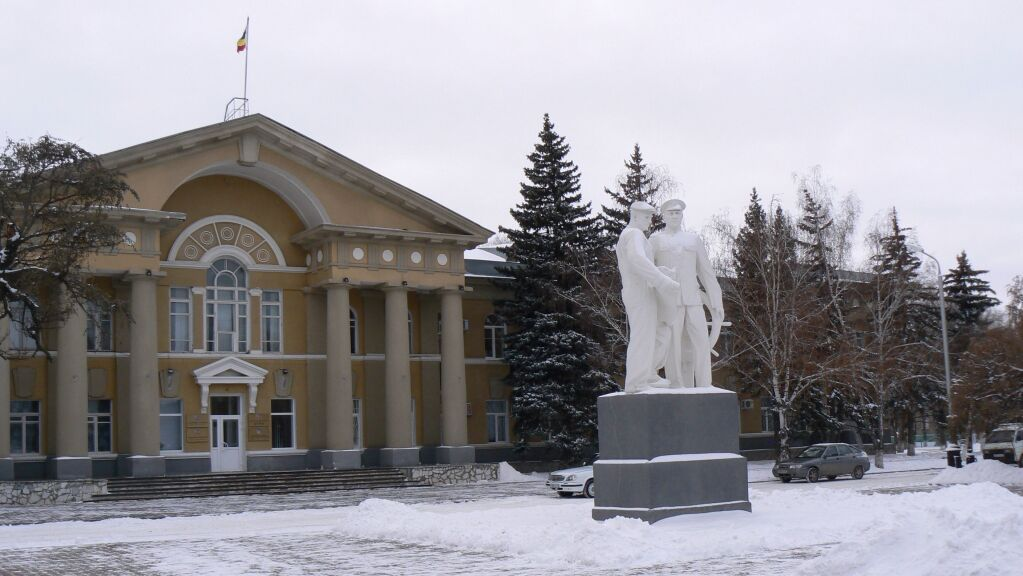
- Volgodonsk City Administration building

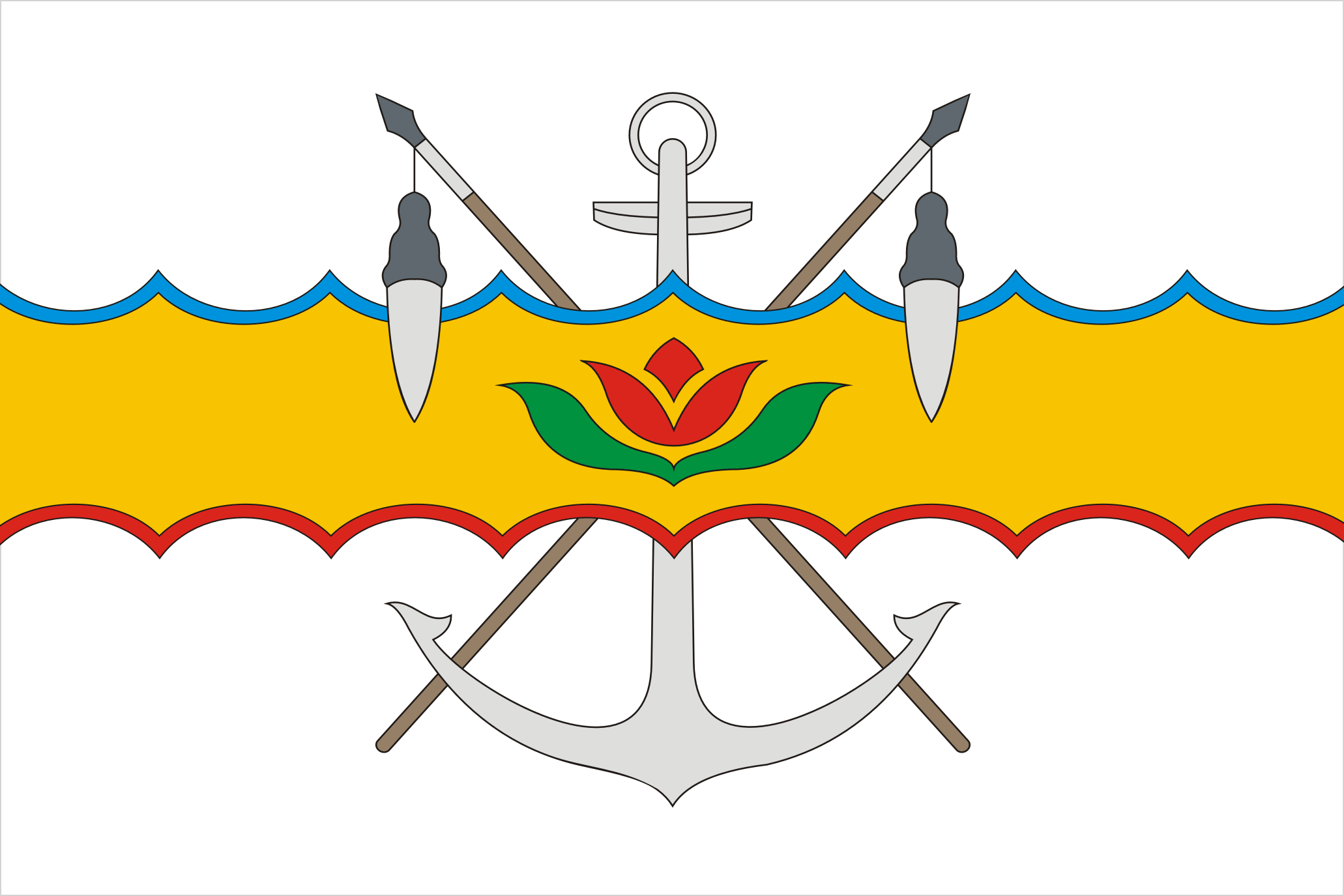
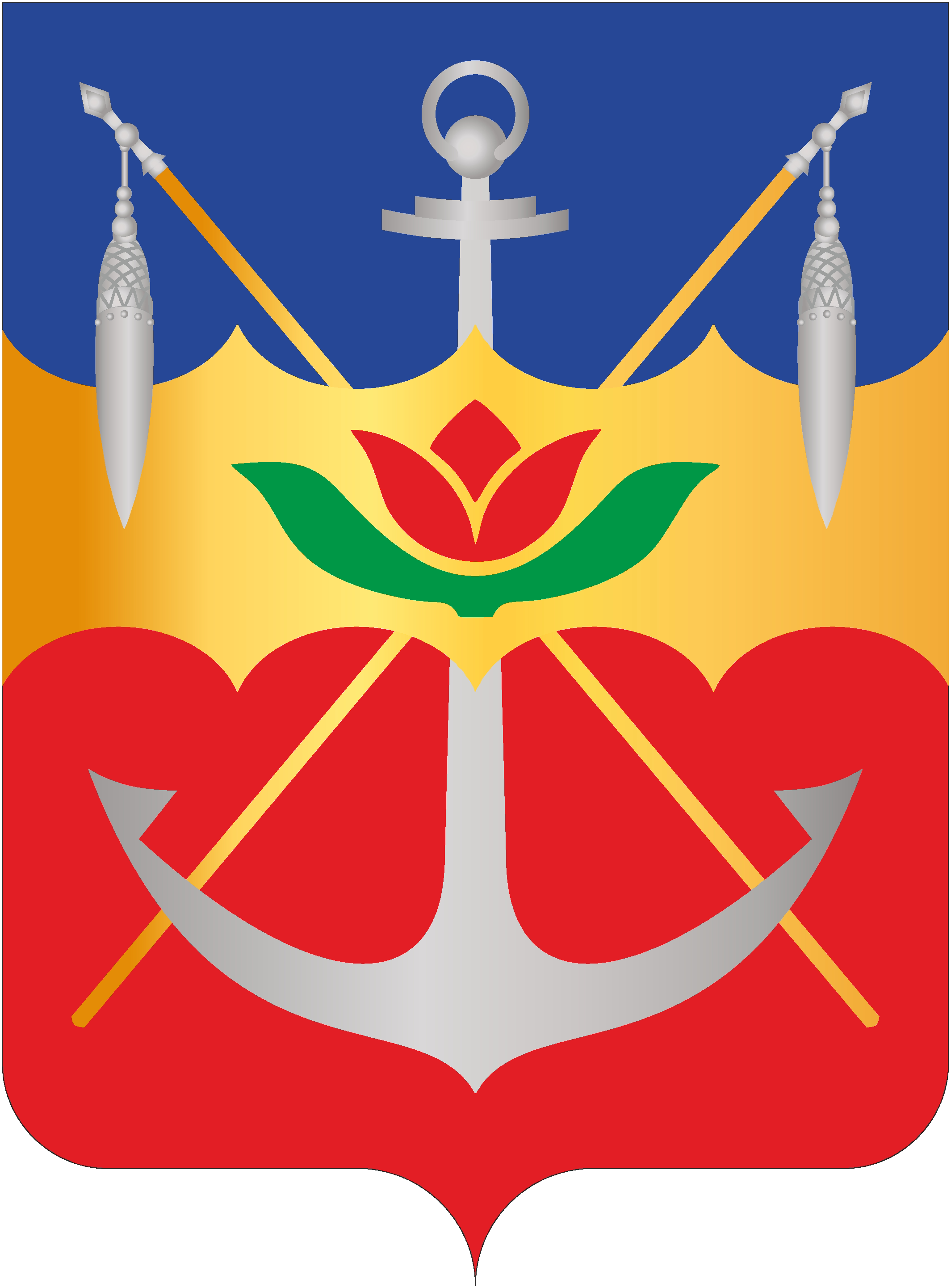
- Flag Coat of arms
- Interactive map of Volgodonsk
- Location of Volgodonsk Volgodonsk (Rostov Oblast)
- Coordinates: 47°31′N 42°09′E
- Country: Russia
- Federal subject: Rostov Oblast
- Founded: July 27, 1950
- City status since: 1956

Government
  - Body: Council of Deputies
  - Head of Administration: Yuri Marinenko
- Elevation: 50 m (160 ft)

Population (2010 Census)
  - Total: 170,841
  - Estimate (2025): 162,908 (−4.6%)
  - Rank: 107th in 2010

Administrative status
  - Subordinated to: Volgodonsk Urban Okrug
  - Capital of: Volgodonsk Urban Okrug

Municipal status
  - Urban okrug: Volgodonsk Urban Okrug
  - Capital of: Volgodonsk Urban Okrug
- Time zone: UTC+3 (MSK)
- Postal code: 347360—347399
- Dialing code: +7 8639
- OKTMO ID: 60712000001
- City Day: July 27
- Website: www.volgodonskgorod.ru

Volgodonsk (Russian: Волгодонск, IPA: [vəlgɐˈdonsk]) is a city in Rostov Oblast, Russia, located in the east of the oblast on the west bank of the Tsimlyansk Reservoir. Population: 170,841 (2010 census); 165,994 (2002 census); 175,593 (1989 Soviet census); 28,000 (1970).

Historical population
Year	Pop.	±%
1959	15,710	—
1970	28,000	+78.2%
1979	91,313	+226.1%
1989	175,593	+92.3%
2002	165,994	−5.5%
2010	170,841	+2.9%
2021	168,048	−1.6%
Source: Census data

== History ==
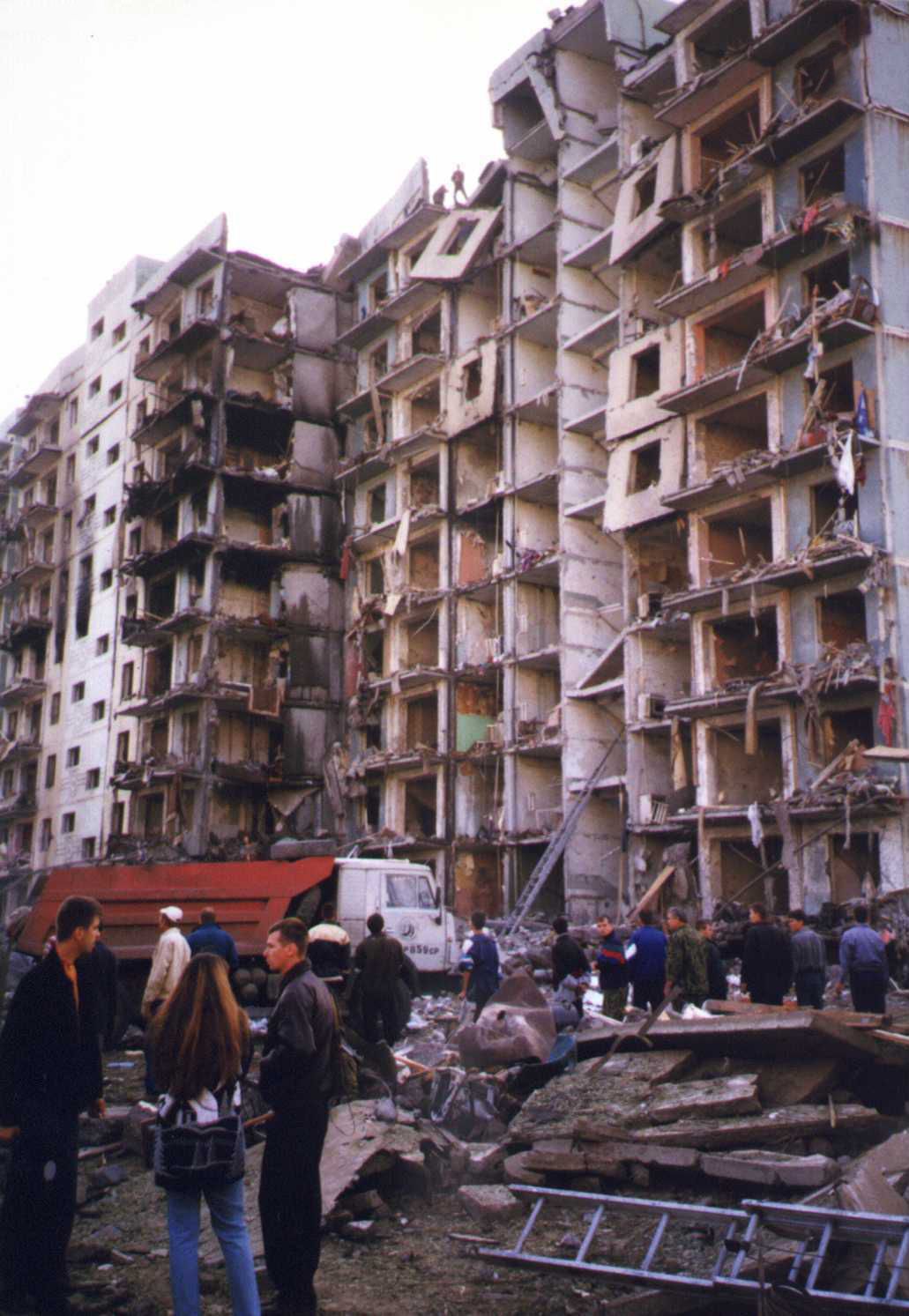
Aftermath of the 1999 bombing

Volgodonsk was founded in 1950 as a small settlement for personnel constructing the Tsimlyansk hydroelectric power station. It grew in size due to the construction of the Volga–Don Canal.

On September 16, 1999, a powerful truck bomb exploded outside an apartment building, killing 17 people and injuring a further 69. It was the fourth explosion in a series of apartment bombings in Russia that killed more than 300 people.

== Administrative and municipal status ==
Within the framework of administrative divisions, it is incorporated as Volgodonsk Urban Okrug—an administrative unit with the status equal to that of the districts. As a municipal division, this administrative unit also has urban okrug status.

== Economy ==
Volgodonsk is one of the economic leaders of Rostov Oblast. The economy of the city is centered around the nuclear industry. It is home to the Atommash factory, which manufactures nuclear reactors and related heavy machinery. The plant mainly builds Rosatom's VVER type pressurized water reactors both for domestic use and export. Four such reactors (VVER-1000 model) generated about 26 600 GWh of electricity at the Rostov nuclear power plant, located just 18 km from the city center. Atommash, the power plant, along with the two thermal power stations, are the city's main employers.

=== Transportation ===
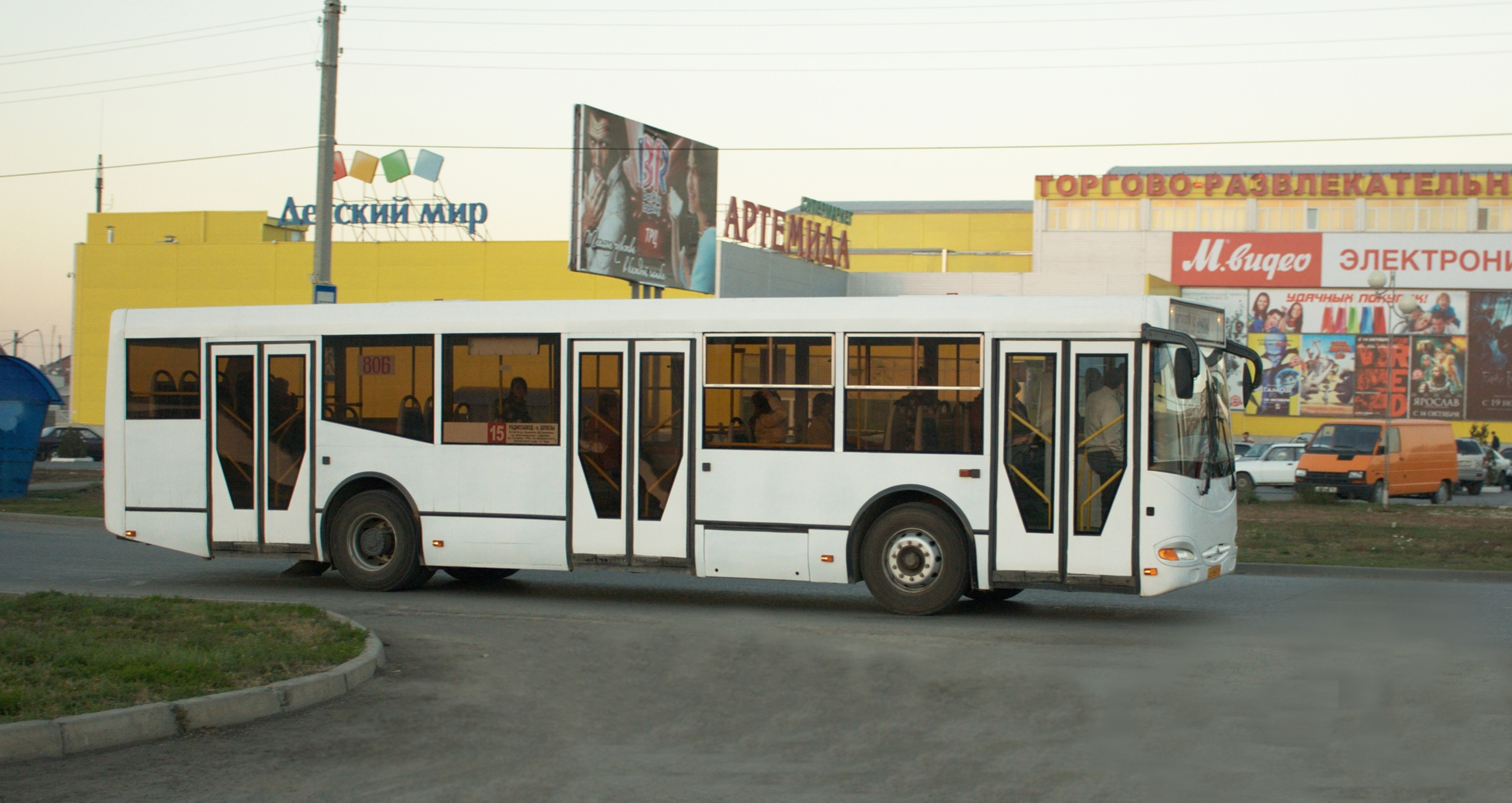
MARZ bus

The city is a regional transport hub on the Volga–Don Canal. A railway and M4 highway pass nearby. Bus routes were launched in 1954. There are presently thirty bus routes. Trolleybuses have been running since 1977. There are currently six trolleybus routes in the city. Volgodonsk port has a strategic importance as access to major ports of different countries.

== Culture ==
Volgodonsk is one of the major cultural centers of Rostov Oblast. There are six art schools, two museums, seventeen historical and cultural sites, and three buildings recognized as architectural monuments of regional importance (Cossacks, Peaceful Atom). The Cathedral of the Nativity is also situated in Volgodonsk.

== Notable people ==
- Oleh Drozdov (born 1966), Ukrainian architect, artist, and teacher
- Vitali Kazantsev (born 1981), Russian football coach and former player
- Aleksei Germashov (born 1982), Russian professional football player
- Aleksandr Omelchenko (born 1983), Russian professional footballer
- Olga Beliaeva (born 1985), Russian water polo player
- Nikita Borisoglebsky (born 1985), Russian violinist
- Dmitry Kudryashov (born 1985), Russian professional boxer and the current WBA International cruiserweight champion
- Anna Grineva (born 1988), Russian water polo player
- Anna Ustyukhina (born 1989), Russian water polo goalkeeper
- Ekaterina Prokofyeva (born 1991), Russian water polo player
- Yuliya Yefimova (born 1992), Russian swimmer
- Pavel Filatyev (born 1988), former soldier in Russia's invasion of Ukraine

== Twin towns ==
- (Hungary) Tamási
