= Vitali Kazantsev =

Russian footballer and coach

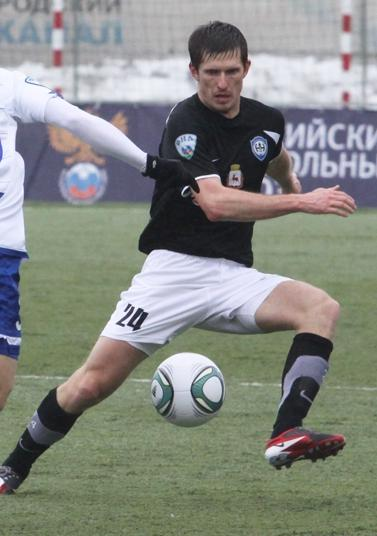
- Kazantsev with Nizhny Novgorod in 2012

Personal information
- Full name: Vitali Vasilyevich Kazantsev
- Date of birth: 4 July 1981 (age 45)
- Place of birth: Volgodonsk, Rostov Oblast, Soviet Union
- Height: 1.77 m (5 ft 10 in)
- Position: Defender

Team information
- Current team: Torpedo-BelAZ Zhodino (assistant coach)

Senior career*
Years	Team	Apps	(Gls)
2000–2005	Olimpia Volgograd	150	(4)
2006–2008	BATE Borisov	43	(0)
2009–2010	Luch-Energiya Vladivostok	61	(2)
2011–2012	Nizhny Novgorod	26	(0)
2012–2013	Luch-Energiya Vladivostok	20	(0)
2013–2015	Torpedo-BelAZ Zhodino	39	(0)

Managerial career
- 2016–2020: Smolevichi (assistant)
- 2020–2021: Liepāja (assistant)
- 2022–: Torpedo-BelAZ Zhodino (assistant)
- * Club domestic league appearances and goals

Vitali Vasilyevich Kazantsev (Russian: Виталий Васильевич Казанцев; born 4 July 1981) is a Russian football coach and former player.
