= Oleh Drozdov =

Ukrainian architect, artist and teacher

- Олег Дроздов
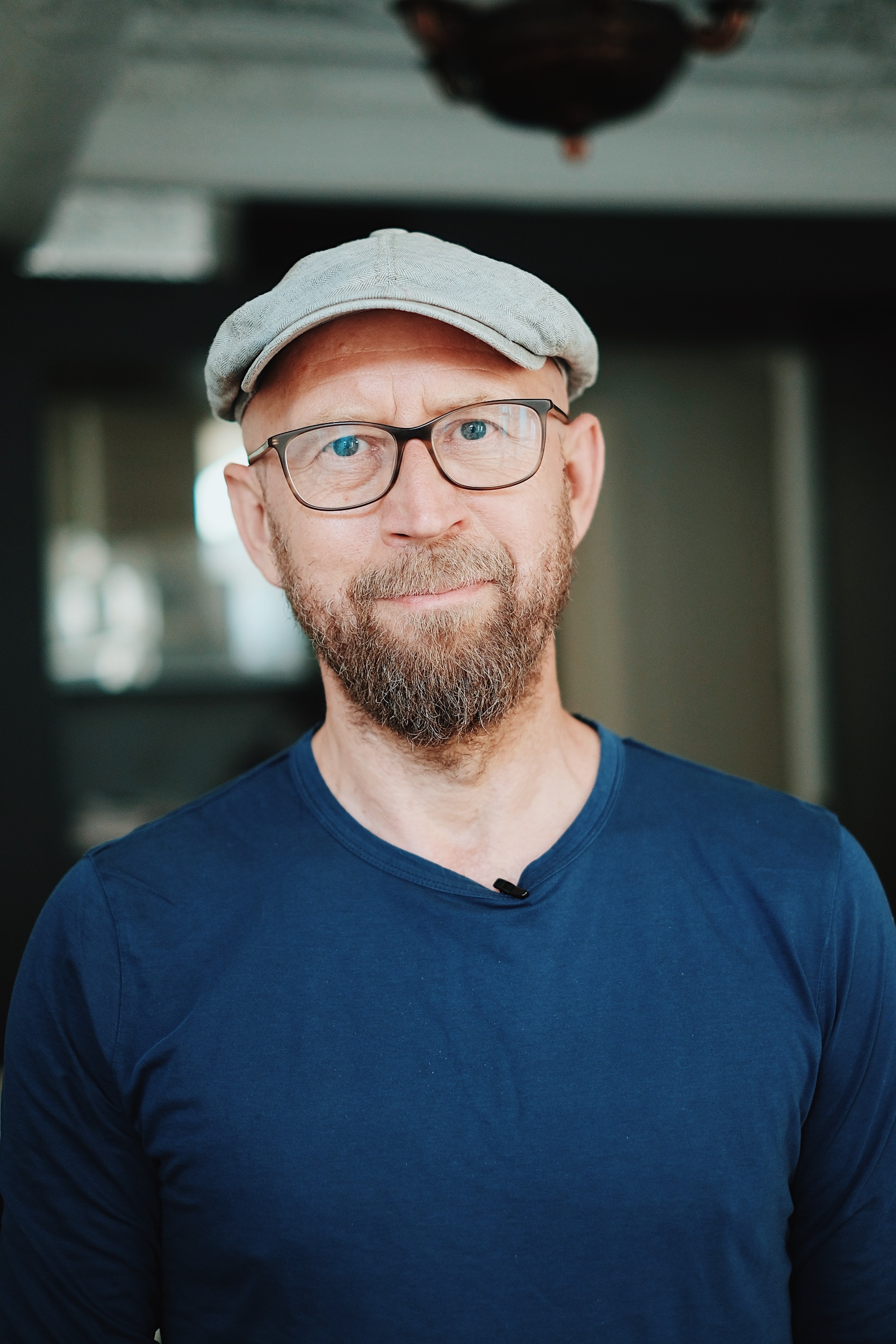
- Born: September 12, 1966 (age 59); Volgodonsk, Russian SFSR, USSR
- Citizenship: Soviet Union; Ukraine
- Occupations: architect, artist, and educator
- Website: https://drozdov-partners.com

Oleh Anatoliiovych Drozdov (Ukrainian: Олег Анатолійович Дроздов; born September 12, 1966) is a Ukrainian architect, artist, and educator. Founder of the architectural bureau Drozdov&Partners and co-founder of the Kharkiv School of Architecture.

== Biography ==
Oleh Drozdov was born on September 12, 1966, in Volgodonsk (USSR). In 1990, he graduated from the Kharkiv Civil Engineering Institute, School of Architecture. While studying at the university, he and his colleagues implemented the first small projects. These were mostly interiors, small cafés and clubs.

In 1990, after graduating from the university, he was assigned to the city of Sumy (Ukraine), where he led an architectural design team in the office of the chief architect until 1993.

From 1991 to 1997, he pursued his career of an artist.

=== Architecture ===
In 1996, Oleg Drozdov started his career in architecture and, together with partners, founded an architectural office, ‘Atrium’. In 1997, ‘Atrium’ was reorganised, renamed and continued its work with new partners. Oleg became a founder and the Chief Architect of Drozdov&Partners, working in Ukraine and abroad. In Kharkiv, the landmark works of Drozdov&Partners include famous business centers Ave Plaza and Platinum Plaza, Yaske restaurant in Danylevskoho st., Status boutique in Sumska st., Prizma shopping centre in Nauky Ave., Heirloom office and residential building in Chernyshevska st., and Carat residential building in Potebni st.

Since 2008, the bureau is a branch of the Department of Fundamentals of Architecture of the Kharkiv National University of Construction and Architecture. It provides educational programs for students and interns, conducts lectures and seminars.

=== Theater on Podil, Ukraine ===
In 2015, Oleg Drozdov was selected as an architect for the Theater on Podil in Kyiv. The Theatre was built under the patronage of the Roshen Corporation, which invested UAH 174 million.

The theater has provoked much discussion and criticism because of its modernist architecture. Many citizens did not like the reconstruction of the building in the historical part of Kyiv, which caused outrage and protests.

At the same time, there were many defenders of the new theater building, who believed that the Podil area needed modern architecture and wondered why Kyivans did not accept modern art.

In 2018, the reconstruction project of the Podil Theater won the Grand Prix of the Ukrainian Urban Awards architectural competition and took the first prize in the Architecture of Cultural and Social Objects category.

In 2019, the restored building of the Theater in Podil was nominated for the European Architectural Award Mies van der Rohe Award 2019.

=== Educational Projects ===
In 2011, Oleg Drozdov co-authored and reviewed the Spring Semester Studio Workshop on Urban Design for students of the School of Architecture, Columbia University GSAPP.

In 2017, on the initiative of Oleg Drozdov, the Kharkiv School of Architecture was founded. It is a private school for architects and urban planners. Drozdov is a co-founder of the Kharkiv School of Architecture and a lecturer at the Department of Architecture and Urbanism. This is the first private architectural school in independent Ukraine. It was funded by eight businessmen from Kyiv, Kharkiv, and Odesa. The Kharkiv School of Architecture is licensed to award the Bachelor's Degree in Architecture and Urbanism.

In 2020, the Kharkiv School of Architecture announced a competition "Be an Architect" for high school students from all over Ukraine. The prizes were certificates for studying architecture at civil engineering and construction universities and participating in the School’s programs.

== Exhibitions, research, and curated projects ==
- 2003 – “Modern Ukrainian Architecture” exhibition, University of Florence, Italy
- 2003 − "Architectural Ambulance" international seminar initiator, Kharkiv
- 2005 − "Monisto: the concept of developing the Odesa coast" Ukrainian national project curator, the International Architecture Biennale, Rotterdam, the Netherlands
- 2006 − "Patiology: density, typology, and privacy of living spaces" exhibition and conference project curator, Ukraine
- 2008−2010 – "Roddom Institute" educational project initiator together with Yuri Rintovt and Alberto Foye, Kharkiv
- 2010 − "Growing or Shrinking" conference organizer, Kharkiv
- 2010 − "Odesa Mama" three project presentations and exhibitions by "Drozdov & Partners" young professionals, curator, Kharkiv
- 2011 − "Identity of Space" international symposium organizer, Kharkiv
- 2012 − "Circumstances" exhibition project curator, the Moscow Biennale of Architecture

== Selected Projects by Drozdov&Partners ==
- House of Restaurants сatering complex (Kharkiv, 2001−2006)
- Status boutique, Sumska st. (Kharkiv, 2003)
- Yaske restaurant, Danylevskoho st. (Kharkiv, 2004)
- Platinum Plaza business center, Sumska st. (Kharkiv, 2006−2010)
- Heirloom office and residential building, Chernyshevskoho st. (Kharkiv, 2007−2010)⦁ [29]
- Carat residential building, Potebny st. (Kharkiv, 2003−2011)
- Ave Plaza shopping center, Sumska st. (Kharkiv, 2003−2011)
- House with a Peristyle private residence (Kharkiv, 2009−2015
- Ark private residence (Kharkiv, 2010−2015)
- Café Très restaurant, Montreux (Switzerland, 2015−2016)
- Baked by the Heat private residence (Kharkiv, 2010−2016)
- Theater on Podil (Kyiv, 2015−2017)
- Sense dental clinic (Kharkiv, 2017−2018)
- Aloft Hotel (Kyiv, 2010−2018)
- VG Horse Club (Kharkiv, 2016−2019

== Awards ==
- 2001 − Grand Prix of the "IHTEP'YEAR" Ukrainian competition for the Florence restaurant project
- 2002 − First Prize in the "Commercial Interior" nomination in "IHTEP'YEAR" Ukrainian competition for the project Symbol Baby
- 2003 − Grand Prix of the "IHTEP'YEAR" Ukrainian competition for the Tampopo restaurant project
- 2011 – Third Prize from “A New School Vision” Cleveland Design Competition, USA, 2012, for the School Garden project
- 2012 − Second Prize of the Voronov Museum of Contemporary Art competition, Kyiv, Ukraine
- 2012 – Best Curated Project at the Moscow Biennale of Architecture, for "Circumstances" project
- 2014 – First Prize of the Daegu International Architecture Competition, South Korea for the Dalseong Citizen's Gymnasium project).
- 2018 − Grand Prix of the National Ukrainian Urban Awards and the Best Project in the "Architecture of Cultural and Social Facilities" nomination for the Theatre on Podil
- 2018 − Architect of the Year, EDIDA (Elle Decoration International Design Awards)
- 2018 – Hotel Project of the Year, EE Real Estate Project Awards, for Aloft Hotel, Kyiv
- 2018 – Architectural Office of the Year, EE Real Estate Project Awards
- 2018 – Nomination for the European Union Mies van der Rohe Architectural Award, 2019, for the Theatre on Podil
- 2021 – Nominations for the European Union Mies van der Rohe Architectural Award, 2022, for Sense Dental Clinic and for VG Horse Club projects
