= Atomenergomash =

Russian nuclear engineering company

- Company type: Joint-stock company
- Industry: Nuclear Power and Power Engineering; Thermal power generation equipment Equipment for oil&gas industry Floating NPP; Special-purpose steels Transport and Marine energy solutions
- Founded: 2006; 20 years ago
- Headquarters: Moscow, Russia
- Key people: Andrey Nikipelov
- Number of employees: 18,455
- Subsidiaries: TSNIITMASH; OKB Gidropress; OKBM Afrikantov; AEM-Technologies; CKMB; Energomashspetsstal; ZiO-Podolsk; AEM-Technologies Volgodonsk; Atommash
- Website: www.aem-group.ru

Atomenergomash JSC (AEM Group) (Russian: Атомэнергомаш, AEM Holding company) is a Russian power engineering company, a supplier of products for nuclear and thermal power plants, natural gas and petrochemical industry, shipbuilding, and special steel markets. It is the mechanical engineering division of Rosatom. Together with its subsidiaries it employees more than 17,000 people.

== History ==
AEM was established in 2006 as part of Rosatom State Atomic Energy Corporation.

== Operations ==
Atomenergomash is a large power engineering holdings in Russia. It involves the designing, manufacturing, and supplying of equipment for nuclear, thermal energy, gas and petrochemical, and shipbuilding industries. It is also active in the market of special grades of steel.

== Structure ==
As a parent company, Atomenergomash includes interest in several subsidiary companies, including:

- TSNIITMASH
- OKB Gidropress
- OKBM Afrikantov
- AEM-Technologies
- CKMB
- Energomashspetsstal
- ZiO-Podolsk
- AEM-Technologies Volgodonsk

Atomenergomash established a joint venture with Alstom (now GE Steam Power) to manufacture Arabelle steam turbines and generators. It also has subsidiaries in Hungary and the Czech Republic. In October, 2010, Atomenergomash and Ukraine's nuclear power company Energoatom, agreed to establish a consortium for the production of equipment for Ukrainian nuclear power plants. In November, 2010, Atomenergomash announced plans to start manufacturing wind turbines and start developing wind farms.

== Management ==
CEO – Kotov Igor Vladimirovich

== See also ==
- Energy policy of Russia
- Nuclear power in Russia
