= Energomash =

Defunct Russian power company

- Industry: power engineering
- Headquarters: Moscow, Russia
- Website: energomash.ru

The Energomash Corporation (Cyrillic: "Энергомаш") was a Russian power engineering company. Energomash manufactures small cogeneration plants as well as a wide variety of components for the energy industry. In addition to this core activity, Energomash also supplies other engineering services to more than 60 countries.

In addition to producing power technologies, Energomash occupied leading positions in metalware construction, pipeline fittings and nuclear industry equipment.

In 2010 the company was declared bankrupt and in 2015 it was liquidated.

== Performance indicators ==
According to the group's own unofficial data, preliminary revenue under IFRS in 2007 was $645 million, EBITDA was $160 million.

The company's revenue in 2006 amounted to RUB 19.596 billion, which is 18.9% more than in 2005. Profit before tax amounted to 449.78 million rubles, gross profit — 4.522 billion rubles (23.1% of revenue).

Among the main customers of the group were Gazprom, Rosenergoatom Concern, as well as major oil companies.

22.4 thousand people worked at the group's enterprises.

At the end of 2008 it planned to launch an IPO.
